= Etchmiadzin Cathedral =

Mother church of Armenia built in the 4th century

Echmiatsin Cathedral
- Էջմիածնի մայր տաճար
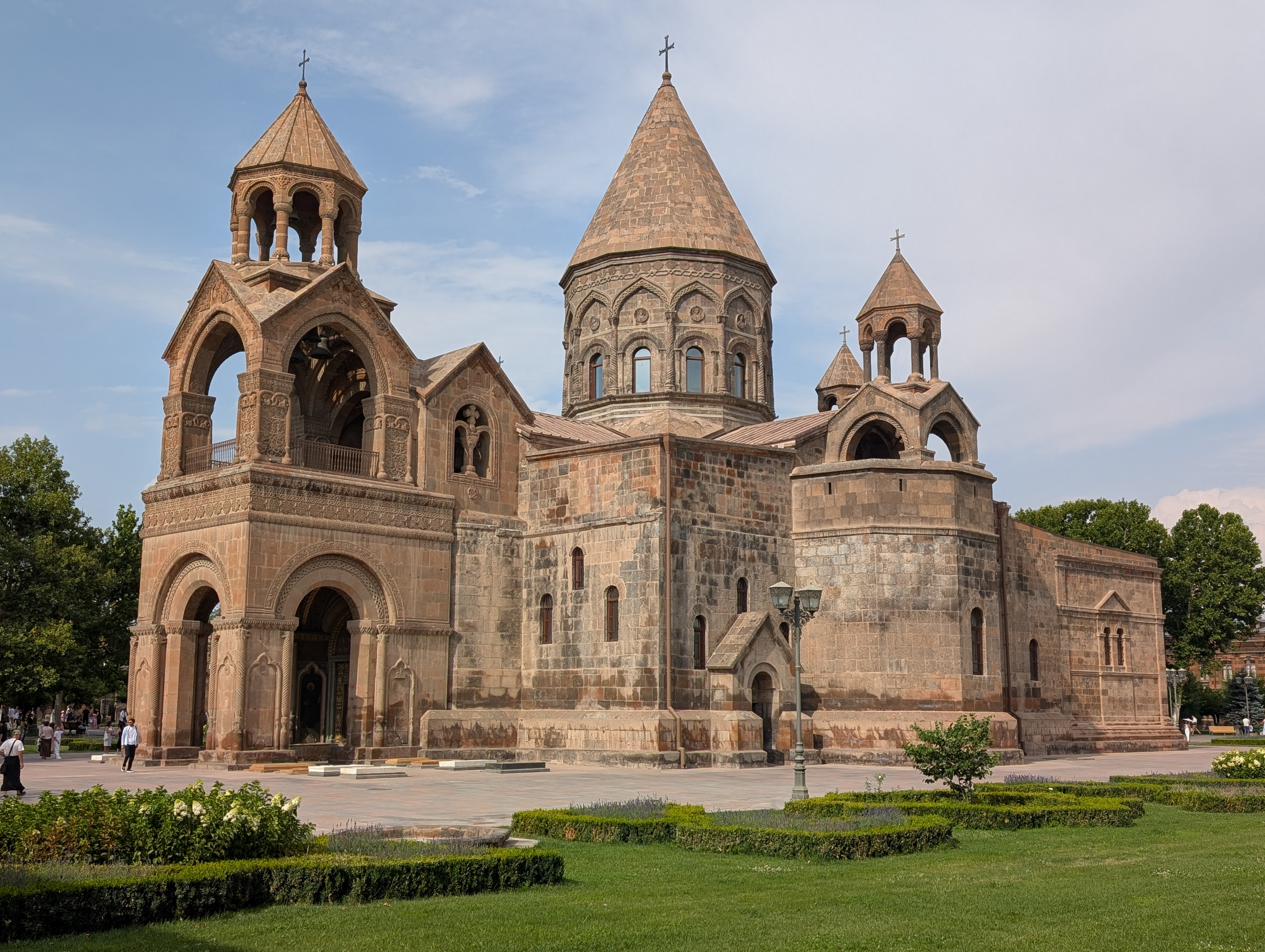

- Location within Armenia

Religion
- Affiliation: Armenian Apostolic Church
- Rite: Armenian
- Leadership: Catholicos of All Armenians
- Status: Active

Location
- Location: Vagharshapat, Armavir Province, Armenia
- Coordinates: 40°09′43″N 44°17′28″E

Architecture
- Type: Cathedral
- Style: Armenian
- Founder: Gregory the Illuminator (original)
- Groundbreaking: 301 (original building; traditional date)
- Completed: 303 (original building; traditional date) 483/4–1868 (current building): 483/4 (core); 17th century (dome); 1654–58 (belfry); 1682 (smaller belfries with turrets); 1868 (sacristy)

Specifications
- Length: 33 m (108 ft)
- Width: 30 m (98 ft)
- Dome height (outer): 34 m (112 ft)
- UNESCO World Heritage Site
- Official name: Cathedral and Churches of Echmiatsin and the Archaeological Site of Zvartnots
- Type: Cultural
- Criteria: (ii) (iii)
- Designated: 2000 (24th session)
- Reference no.: 1011-001
- Region: Western Asia

Echmiatsin Cathedral (Note: Armenian: Էջմիածնի մայր տաճար, romanized: Ēǰmiaçni mayr tač̣ar. Less commonly referred to as the Cathedral of Holy Etchmiadzin, Holy Etchmiadzin (Armenian: Սուրբ Էջմիածին, romanized: Surb Ejmiatsin) or simply Etchmiadzin. Alternatively spelled as Echmiadzin, Ejmiatsin, and Edjmiadsin.) is the mother church of the Armenian Apostolic Church, located in the city dually known as Echmiatsin (Ejmiatsin) and Vagharshapat, Armenia. (Note: The city has been called Vagharshapat for the most of its history. It was officially called Etchmiadzin or Ejmiatsin between 1945 and 1995. Nowadays, both names are used interchangeably.) Constructed at the turn of the fourth century, it is usually considered the first cathedral built in ancient Armenia, and often regarded as the oldest cathedral in the world.

The original Echmiatsin church was built in the early fourth century—between 301 and 303 according to tradition—by Armenia's patron saint Gregory the Illuminator, following the adoption of Christianity as a state religion by King Tiridates III. It was built over a pagan temple, symbolizing the conversion from paganism to Christianity. The core of the current building was built in 483/4 by Vahan Mamikonian after the cathedral was severely damaged in a Persian invasion. From its foundation until the second half of the fifth century, Echmiatsin was the seat of the Catholicos, the supreme head of the Armenian Church.

Although never losing its significance, the cathedral subsequently suffered centuries of virtual neglect. In 1441 it was restored as catholicosate and remains as such to this day. Since then the Mother See of Holy Etchmiadzin has been the administrative headquarters of the Armenian Church. Echmiatsin was plundered by Shah Abbas I of Persia in 1604, when relics and stones were taken out of the cathedral to New Julfa in an effort to undermine Armenians' attachment to their land. Since then the cathedral has undergone a number of renovations. Belfries were added in the latter half of the seventeenth century and in 1868 a sacristy (museum and room of relics) was constructed at the cathedral's east end. Today, it incorporates styles of different periods of Armenian architecture. Diminished during the early Soviet period, Echmiatsin revived again in the second half of the twentieth century, and under independent Armenia.

As the center of Armenian Christianity, Echmiatsin has been an important location in Armenia not only religiously, but also politically and culturally. A major pilgrimage site, it is one of the most visited places in the country. Along with several important early medieval churches located nearby, the cathedral was listed as a World Heritage Site by UNESCO in 2000.

== Setting ==
The cathedral is located at the center of the Mother See of Holy Etchmiadzin, the administrative headquarters of the Armenian Apostolic Church, in the town dually known as Vagharshapat or Etchmiadzin (Ejmiatsin). The seventh century churches of St. Hripsime, St. Gayane, the ruined Zvartnots Cathedral, and the 17th century Shoghakat Church are all located in the same town, within short distances from the cathedral.

For much of its history, the complex around the cathedral, which includes the residence of the Catholicos (patriarch), has been known as the Monastery of Etchmiadzin (Էջմիածնի վանք). It was formerly surrounded by 30 ft (9.1 m) high walls, made of brick or cob, and had eight circular towers (turrets). Its external appearance led 19th century visitors to widely compare it to a fortress. The walled monastery, a vast quadrangular enclosure, could have been accessed through four gates.

The cathedral stood—and continues to stand—at the center of a courtyard (a quadrangle), which by Lynch's measurements in the 1890s, was 349 ft 6 in × 335 ft 2 in (106.53 m × 102.16 m), making it larger than the Trinity Great Court in Cambridge, England. He suggested that it may have been at the time the largest quadrangle in the world.

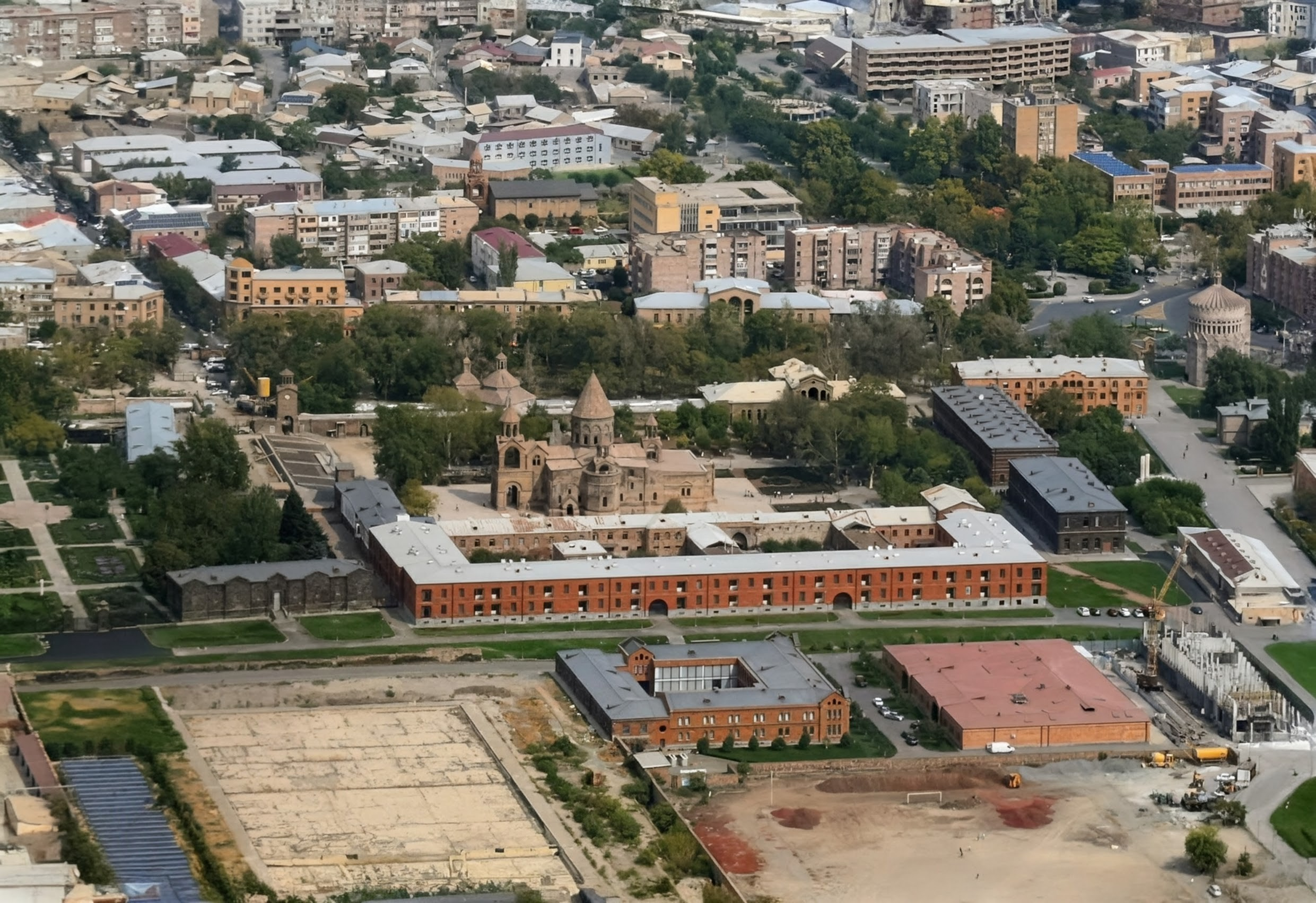
An aerial view of the cathedral from a plane

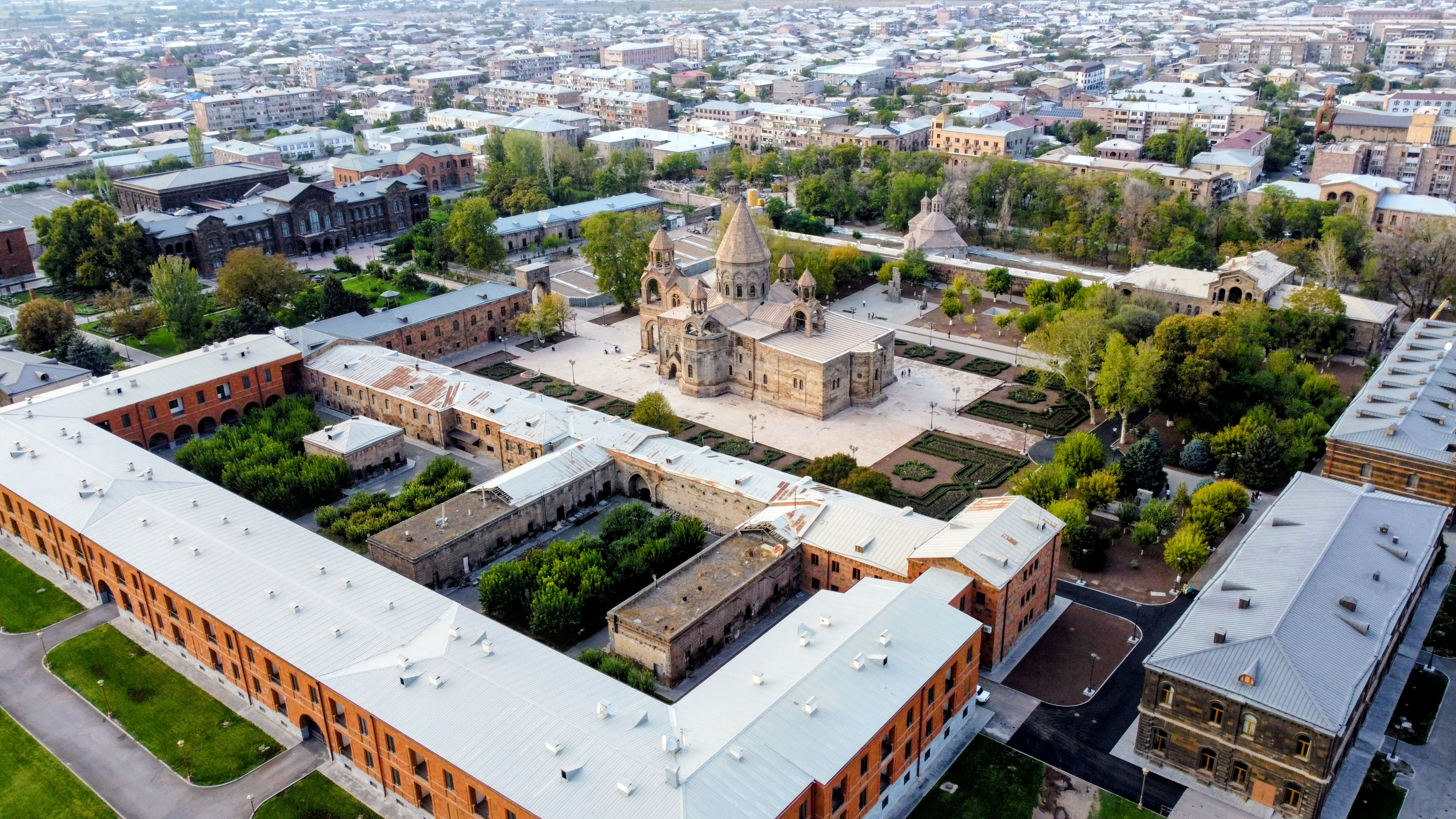
A closer aerial view

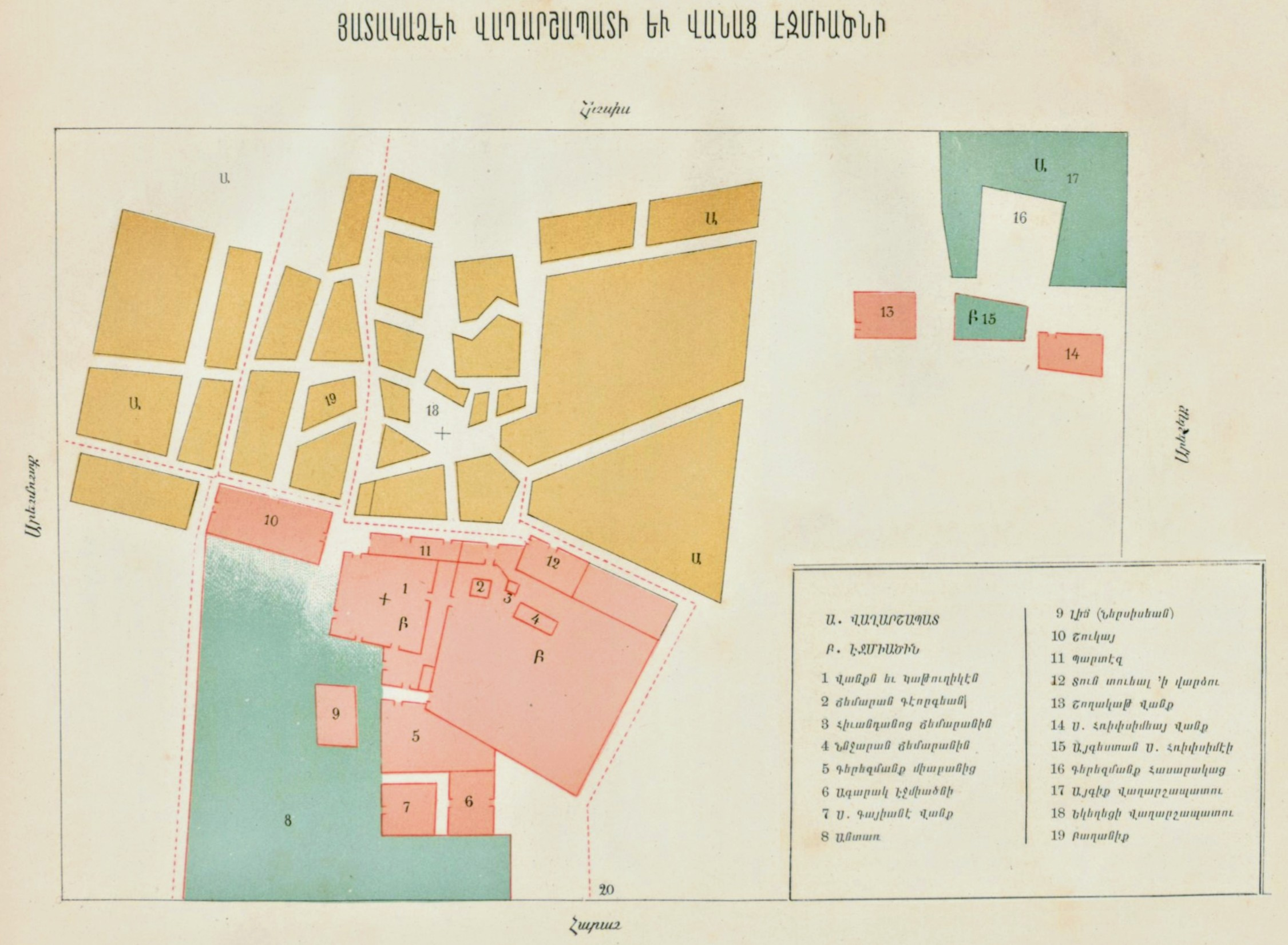
A map of Vagharshapat (brown) and the monastery (red) in the late 19th century (by Ghevont Alishan). The cathedral is marked as 1.

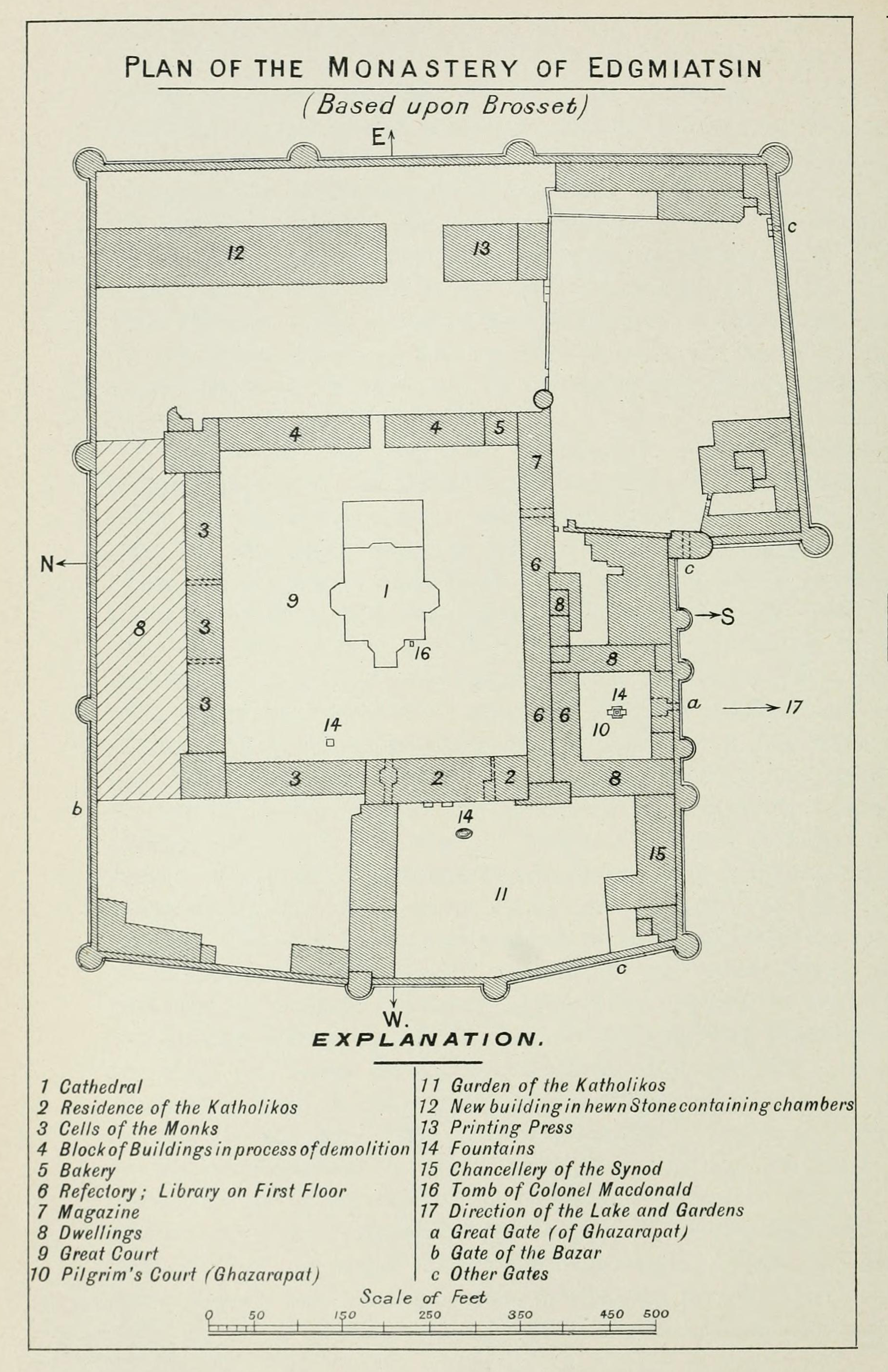
A plan of the monastery H. F. B. Lynch

== History ==
=== Pre-Christian remains ===
Although no historical sources point to a pre-Christian place of worship in its place, the cathedral is believed to have been built on the site of a pagan temple. A granite Urartian stele dated to the 8th-6th centuries BC was excavated under the main altar in the 1950s suggesting the existence of a temple, Urartu scholar Mikayel Badalyan suggested that the stele originally stood at or near the site as part of a Urartian ritual complex, noting that the location may have served as an open-air sanctuary or the tomb of one or more high-ranking individuals. (Note: Tovma Khachatryan suggested that the presumed temple may have been dedicated to Ḫaldi or Teišeba.) Also excavated under the altar was an amphora, which has been interpreted to have been a part of a Zoroastrian fire temple. (Note: The temple has been proposed to have been dedicated to either goddess Anahit, or archangel Sandaramet, major figures in Zoroastrian-influenced Armenian mythology.)

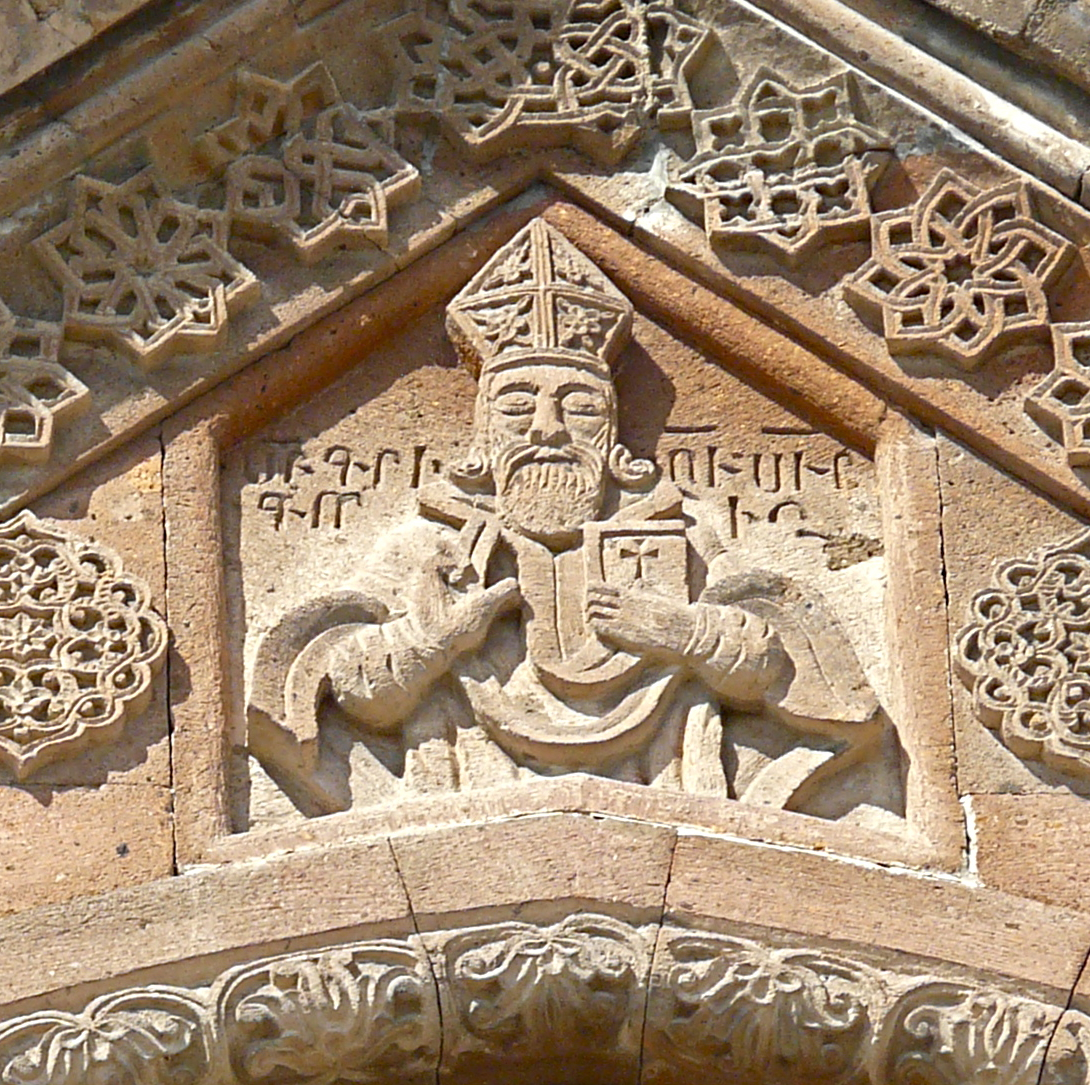
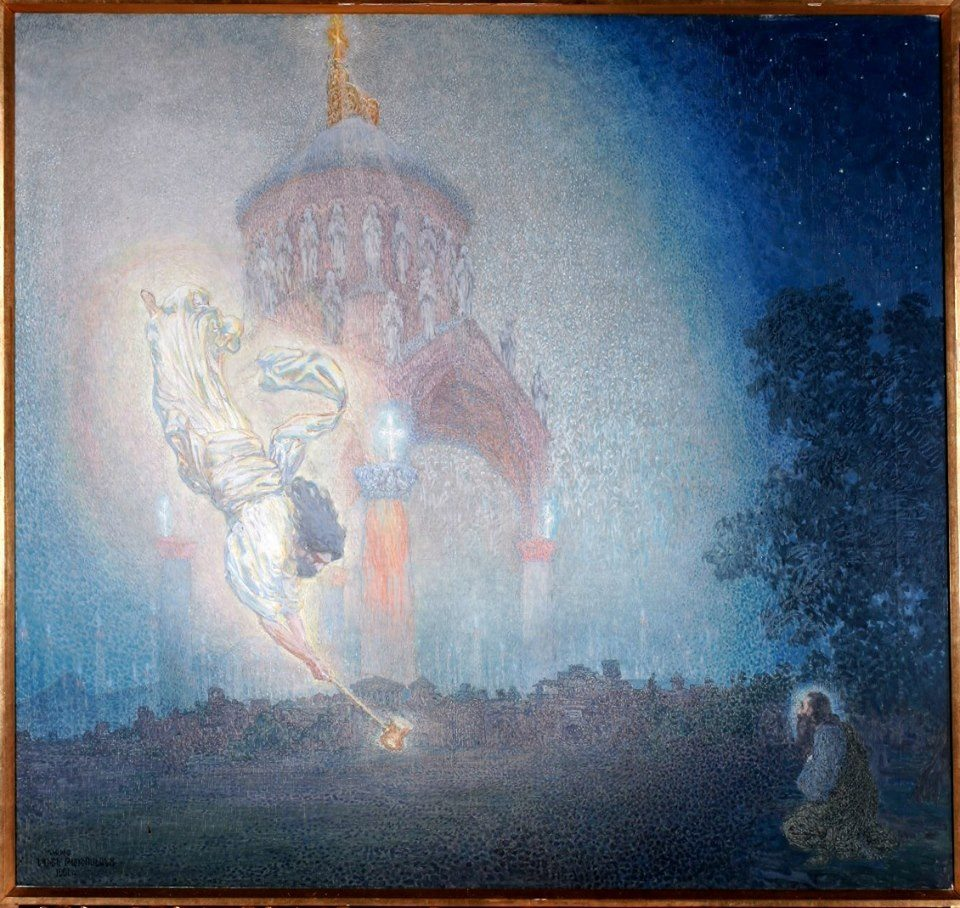
A relief of Gregory the Illuminator on the cathedral's western belfry (1650s) and a 1901 painting of Gregory's vision by Yeghishe Tadevosyan.

=== Foundation and etymology ===
In the early fourth century the Kingdom of Greater Armenia, under Tiridates III, became the first country in the world to adopt Christianity as a state religion. (Note: 301 AD is the traditional date, first calculated by historian Mikayel Chamchian. A growing number of authors argue that the correct date is 314 by citing the Edict of Milan. Elizabeth Redgate writes that "the scholarly consensus is to prefer c. 314.") Armenian church tradition places the cathedral's foundation between 301 and 303, but scholars have proposed other dates. (Note: Malachia Ormanian suggested that the cathedral was built in 303 within seven months because the building was not huge and probably, partially made of wood. He also argued that the foundation of the preexisting temple could have been preserved. Vahagn Grigoryan dismisses these dates as implausible and states that at least several years were needed for its construction. He cites Agathangelos, who does not mention the cathedral in an episode that took place in 306 and suggests the usage of the span of 302 to 325—the reign of Gregory the Illuminator as Catholicos as the dates of the cathedral's construction.) It was built near the royal palace in what was then the Armenian capital of Vagharshapat.

In his History of the Armenians, Agathangelos narrates the legend of the cathedral's foundation. Armenia's patron saint Gregory the Illuminator had a divine vision descending from heaven and striking the earth with a golden hammer to show where the cathedral should be built. Later tradition associated the figure with Jesus Christ, hence the name of Echmiatsin, (Note: էջ ēĵ "descent" + մի mi "only" + -ա- -a- (linking element) + ծին tsin "begotten") which translates to "the Descent of the Only-Begotten [Son of God]". However, the name Echmiatsin did not come into use until the 15th century, while earlier sources call it "Cathedral of Vagharshapat." (Note: Վաղարշապատի Կաթողիկե եկեղեցի Vağaršapati Kat'oğike yekeghetsi) or simply Kat'oghike (Կաթողիկե, literally "Cathedral"). Malachia Ormanian defined "katoghike" as "cathedral" and wrote that the word was used particularly for Etchmiadzin Cathedral. In modern Armenian, "katoghike" is also used to refer to the Catholic Church. It is derived from the Ancient Greek word καθολικός katholikos, which means "universal". The cathedral has been so called as a description of the "universality" of the Church.) The Feast of the Cathedral of Holy Echmiatsin is celebrated by the Armenian Church 64 days after Easter, during which a hymn, written by the 8th century Catholicos Sahak III, retelling St. Gregory's vision, is sung.

The form of the original fourth century church as proposed by Alexander Sahinian (1966)

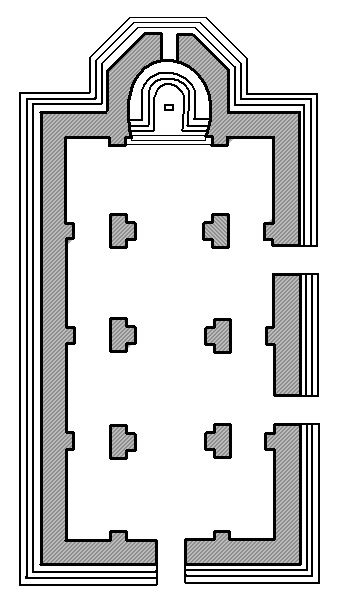

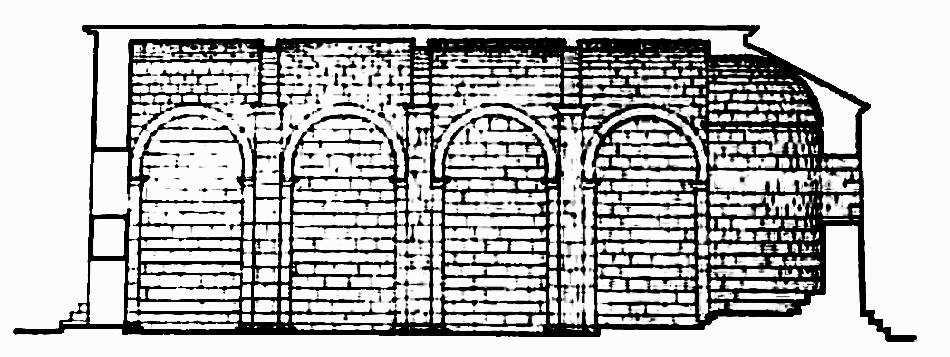
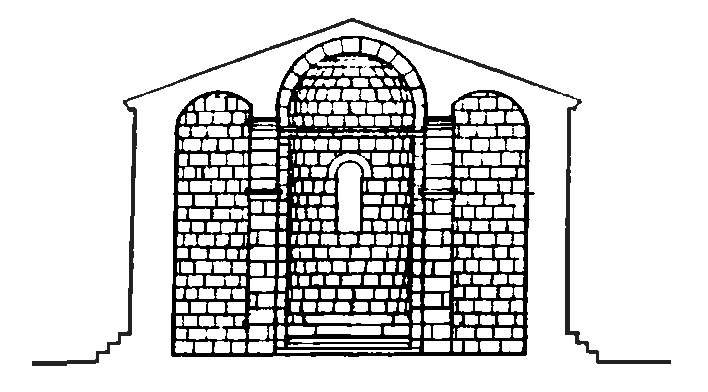

Archaeological excavations in the 1950s, led by Alexander Sahinian, uncovered the remains of the original fourth-century building, including two levels of pillar bases below the current ones and a narrower altar apse under the present one. Based on these findings, Sahinian asserted that the original church had been a three-naved vaulted basilica, similar to the basilicas of Tekor, Ashtarak and Aparan (Kasagh). However, other scholars, have rejected Sahinian's view. Among them, Suren Yeremian and Armen Khatchatrian held that the original church had been in the form of a rectangle with a dome supported by four pillars. Stepan Mnatsakanian suggested that the original building had been a "canopy erected on a cross [plan]," while Vahagn Grigoryan proposes what Mnatsakanian describes as an "extreme view," that the cathedral has been essentially in the same form as it is today.

=== Reconstruction and decline ===
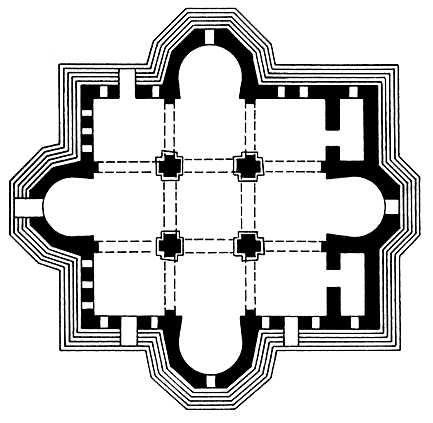
The ground plan of the cathedral after the 5th century reconstruction

The city of Vagharshapat and the cathedral were almost completely destroyed during the invasion of Sasanian King Shapur II c. 363. Due to Armenia's unfavorable economic conditions, the cathedral was renovated only partially by Catholicoi Nerses the Great (r. 353–373) and Sahak Parthev (r. 387 – and Catholicos Nerses 439). After Armenia was partitioned between the Roman and Sasanian Empires in 387, Echmiatsin became part of the Persian-controlled east, under the rule of Armenian vassal kings until 428, when the Armenian Kingdom was dissolved. In 450, in an attempt to impose Zoroastrianism on Armenians, Sasanian King Yazdegerd II built a fire temple inside the cathedral. The pyre of the fire temple was unearthed under the altar of the east apse during the excavations in the 1950s. (Note: The remains of the 4th century apse, the fire temple and other architectural details are now kept at a special structure built relatively recently under the east apse.)

By the last quarter of the fifth century the cathedral was dilapidated. According to the contemporary historian Ghazar Parpetsi, it was rebuilt from the foundations by Vahan Mamikonian, marzpan (governor) of Persian Armenia. Modern historians place the event in 483/4, a period when the country was relatively stable following the struggle for religious freedom against Persia. Most researchers have concluded that, thus, the church was converted into cruciform church and mostly took its current form. (Note: "In 483/484 ... the basic core of the current structure was created..." "483–484 Reconstructed by Vahan Mamikonyan. Etchmiadzin develops the design we see today.") The new church was very different from the original one and "consisted of quadric-apsidal hall built of dull, grey stone containing four free-standing cross-shaped pillars disdained to support a stone cupola." The new cathedral was "in the form of a square enclosing a Greek cross and contains two chapels, one on either side of the east apse."

Although the seat of the Catholicos was transferred to Dvin sometime in the 460s–470s or 484, the cathedral never lost its significance and remained "one of the greatest shrines of the Armenian Church." The last known renovations until the 15th century were made by Catholicos Komitas in 618 (according to Sebeos) and Catholicos Nerses III (r. 640–661). In 982 the cross of the cathedral was reportedly removed by an Arab emir.

Over the course of these centuries of neglect, the cathedral deteriorated to such an extent that it inspired the renowned archbishop Stepanos Orbelian to compose one of his better known poems, "Lament on Behalf of the Cathedral", in 1300. (Note: «Ողբ ի դիմաց Կաթողիկէին», Voğb i dimats Katoğikein. The complete title is "Allegorical prosopopoeia on the Holy Cathedral at Vagharshapat" («Բան բարառնական ոդեալ դիմառնաբար ի դիմաց Վաղարշապատու ս. Կաթուղիկէին», Ban barařnakan vodeal dimařnabar i dimats Vagharshapatu s. Katoğikein). It was first printed in Nor Nakhichevan in 1790.) In the poem, which tells about the consequences of the Mongol and Mamluk invasions of Armenia and Cilicia, Orbelian portrays Echmiatsin Cathedral "as a woman in mourning, contemplating her former splendor and exhorting her children to return to their homeland [...] and restore its glory."

=== From revival to plunder ===
Following the fall of the Armenian Kingdom of Cilicia in 1375, the See of Sis experienced decline and disarray. The Catholicosate of Aghtamar and the locally influential Syunik bishops enhanced the importance of the region around Echmiatsin. In 1441 a general council of several hundred religious figures met in Etchmiadzin and voted to reestablish a catholicosate there. The cathedral was restored by Catholicos Kirakos (Cyriacus) between 1441 and 1443. At that time Echmiatsin was under the control of the Turkic Kara Koyunlu, but in 1502, Safavid Iran gained control of parts of Armenia, including Echmiatsin, and granted the Armenian Church some privileges.

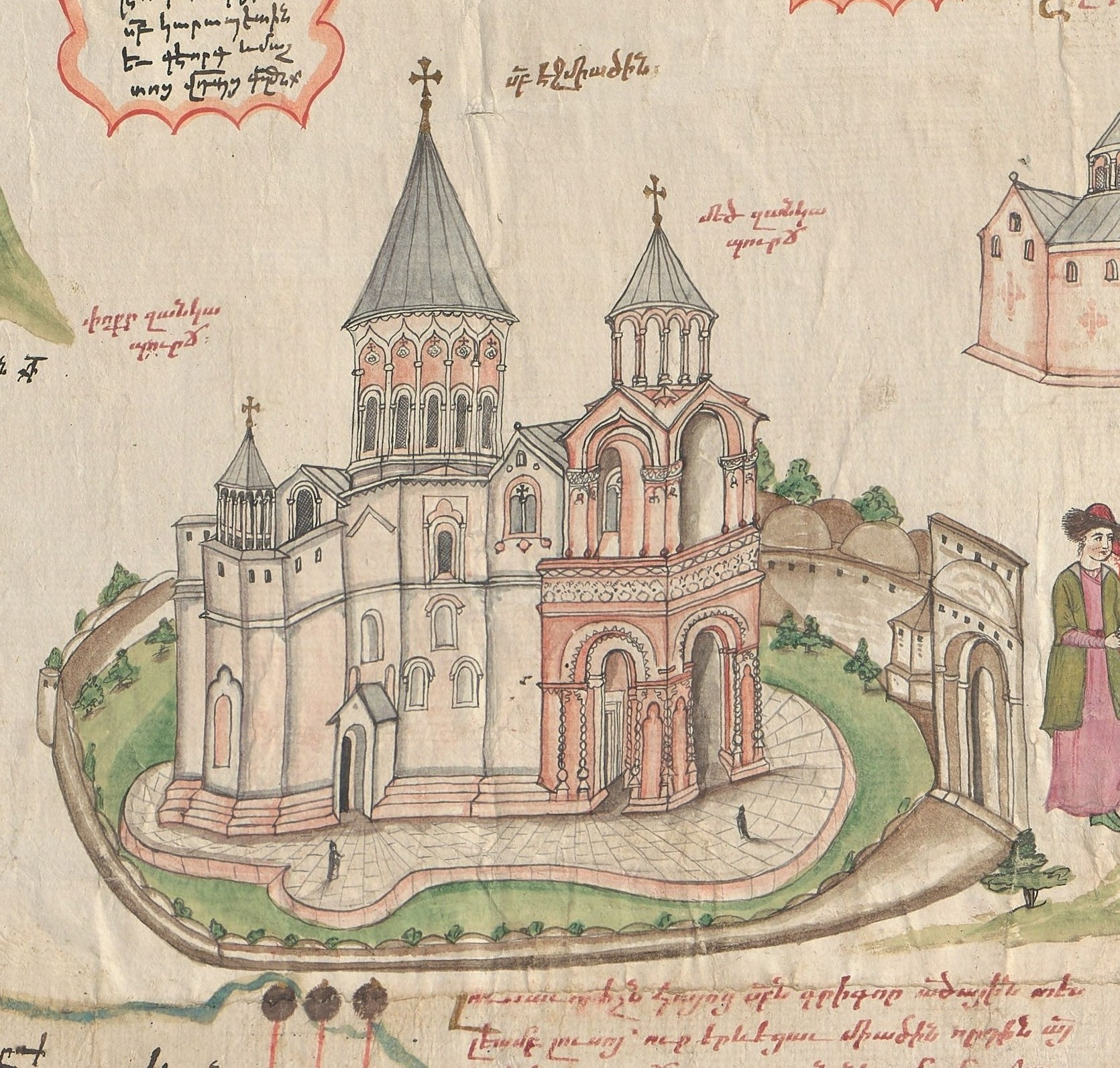
A detail from a 1691 map of Armenia by Eremia Chelebi, an Ottoman Armenian traveler.

During the 16th and 17th centuries, Armenia suffered from its location between Persia and Ottoman Turkey, and the conflicts between those two empires. Concurrently with the deportation of up to 350,000 Armenians into Persia by Shah Abbas I as part of the scorched earth policy during the war with the Ottoman Empire, Echmiatsin was plundered in 1604.

The Shah wanted to "dispel Armenian hopes of returning to their homeland" by moving the religious center of the Armenians to Iran in order to provide Persia with a strong Armenian presence. He wanted to destroy the cathedral and have it physically transferred to the newly founded Armenian community of New Julfa near the royal capital of Isfahan. Shah Abbas offered the prospective new cathedral in New Julfa to Echmiatsin chmiatsin ed, possibly because of the high costs. In the event, only some important stones—the altar, the stone where Jesus Christ descended according to tradition, and Armenian Church's holiest relic, the Right Arm of Gregory the Illuminator—were moved to New Julfa. They were incorporated in the local Armenian St. Georg Church when it was built in 1611. Fifteen stones from chmiatsin n at St. Georg.

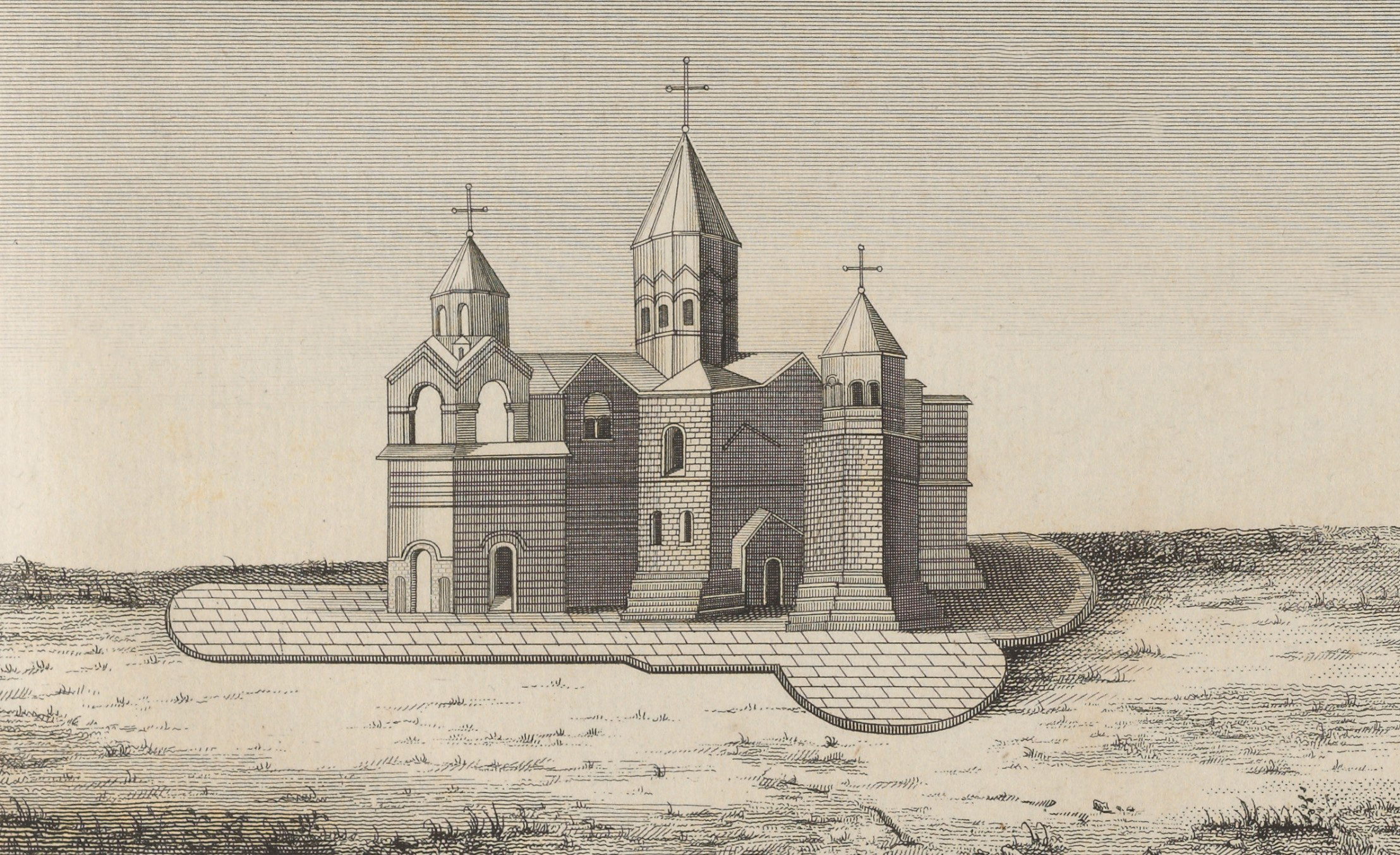
An engraving of Echmiatsin in the late 17th century by Jean Chardin (from 1811 edition)․

=== 17th–18th centuries ===
Since 1627, the cathedral underwent a major renovation under Catholicos Movses (Moses), when the dome, ceiling, roof, foundations and paving were repaired. At this time, cells for monks, a guesthouse and other structures were built around the cathedral. Additionally, a wall was built around the cathedral, making it a fort-like complex.

The renovation works were interrupted by the Ottoman–Safavid War of 1635–1636, during which the cathedral remained intact. The renovations resumed under Catholicos Pilippos (1632–1655), who built new cells for monks and renovated the roof. During this century, belfries were added to many Armenian churches. In 1653–1654, he started the construction of the belfry in the western wing of Echmiatsin Cathedral. It was completed in 1658 by Catholicos Hakob IV Jugayetsi. Decades later, in 1682, Catholicos Yeghiazar constructed smaller bell towers with red tuff turrets on the southern, eastern, and northern wings.

The renovations of Echmiatsin continued during the 18th century. In 1720, Catholicos Astvatsatur and then, in 1777–1783 Simeon I of Yerevan took actions in preserving the cathedral. In 1770, Simeon I established a publishing house near Echmiatsin, the first in Armenia. During Simeon's reign, the monastery was completely walled and separated from the city of Vagharshapat. Catholicos Ghukas (Lucas) continued the renovations in 1784–1786.

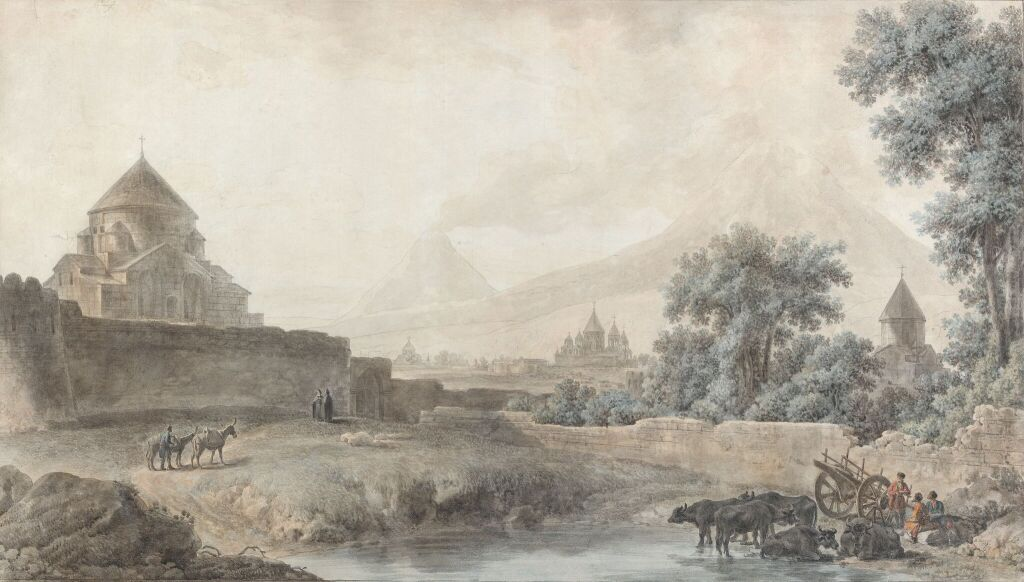
A 1783 watercolor of the churches of Echmiatsin by Mikhail Matveevich Ivanov. (Note: Ivan Aivazovsky subsequently offered his version based on Ivanov's original.) From left to right: Hripsime, Gayane, Echmiatsin Cathedral, and Shoghakat.

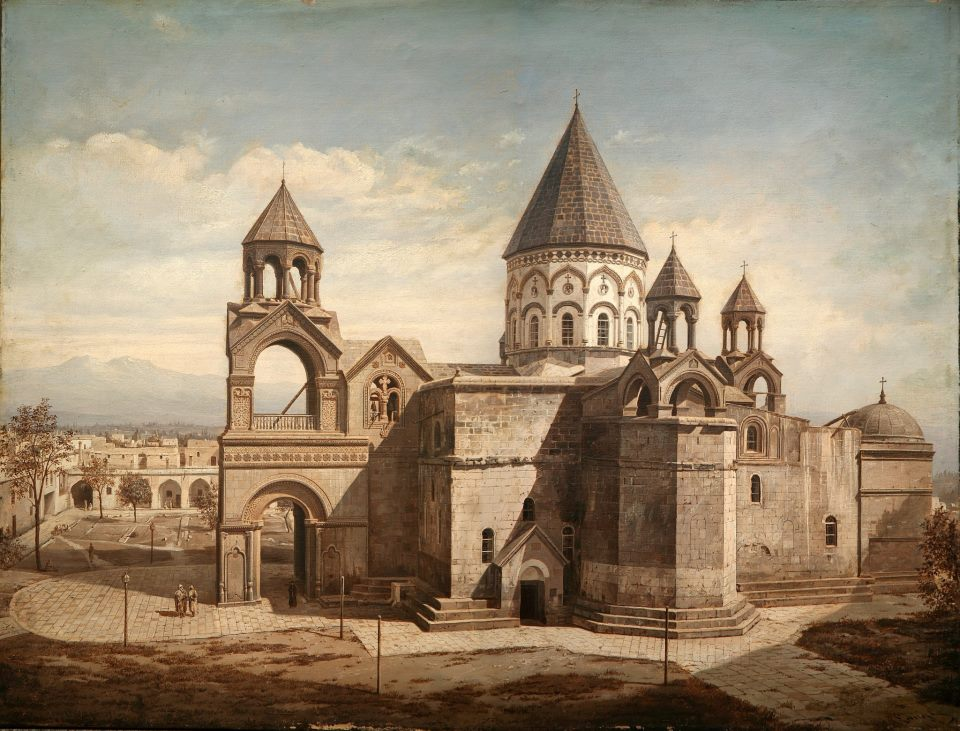
Painting of the cathedral by an unknown European artist (1870s)

=== Russian takeover ===
The Russian Empire gradually penetrated Transcaucasia by the early 19th century. Persia's Erivan Khanate, in which Echmiatsin was located, became an important target for the Russians. In June 1804, during the Russo-Persian War (1804–1813), the Russian troops led by General Pavel Tsitsianov tried to take Echmiatsin, but failed. A few days after the attempt, the Russians returned to Echmiatsin, where they caught a different Persian force by surprise and routed them. Tsitsianov's forces entered Etchmiatsin which, according to Auguste Bontems-Lefort, a contemporary French military envoy to Persia, they looted, seriously damaging the Armenian religious buildings. Shortly after, the Russians were forced to withdraw from the area as a result of the successful Persian defense of Erivan. According to Bontems-Lefort, the Russian behaviour at Echmiatsin contrasted with that of the Persian king, who treated the local Christian population with respect.

On 13 April 1827, during the Russo-Persian War (1826–1828), Echmiatsin was captured by the Russian General Ivan Paskevich's troops without fight and was formally annexed by Russia, with the Persian-controlled parts of Armenia, roughly corresponding to the territory of the modern Republic of Armenia (also known as Eastern Armenia), according to the 1828 Treaty of Turkmenchay.

The cathedral prospered under Russian rule, despite the suspicions that the Imperial Russian government had about Echmiatsin becoming a "possible center of the Armenian nationalist sentiment." Formally, Echmiatsin became the religious center of the Armenians living within the Russian Empire by the 1836 statute or constitution (polozhenie).

In 1868, Catholicos Gevorg (George) IV made the last major alteration to the cathedral by adding a sacristy (museum and room of relics) to its east end. In 1874, he established the Gevorgian Seminary, a theological school-college located on the cathedral's premises. Catholicos Markar I undertook the restoration of the interior of the cathedral in 1888.

=== 20th century and on ===
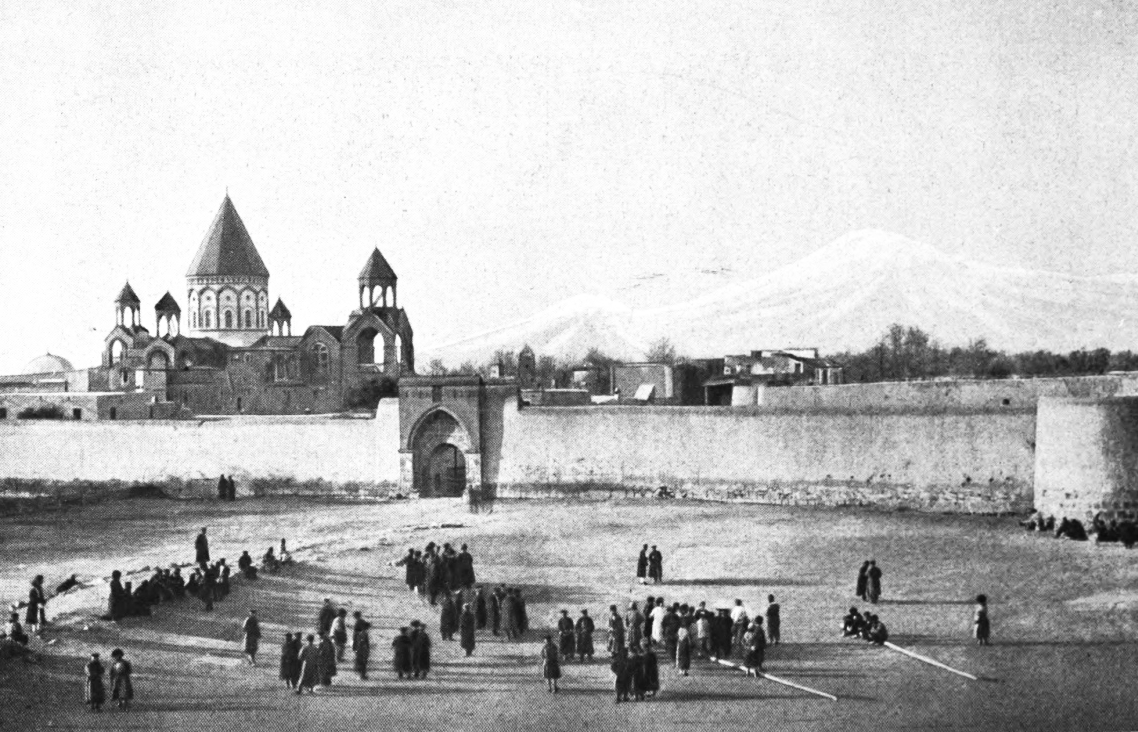
The monastery of Echmiatsin in the early 20th century with Mount Ararat in the background

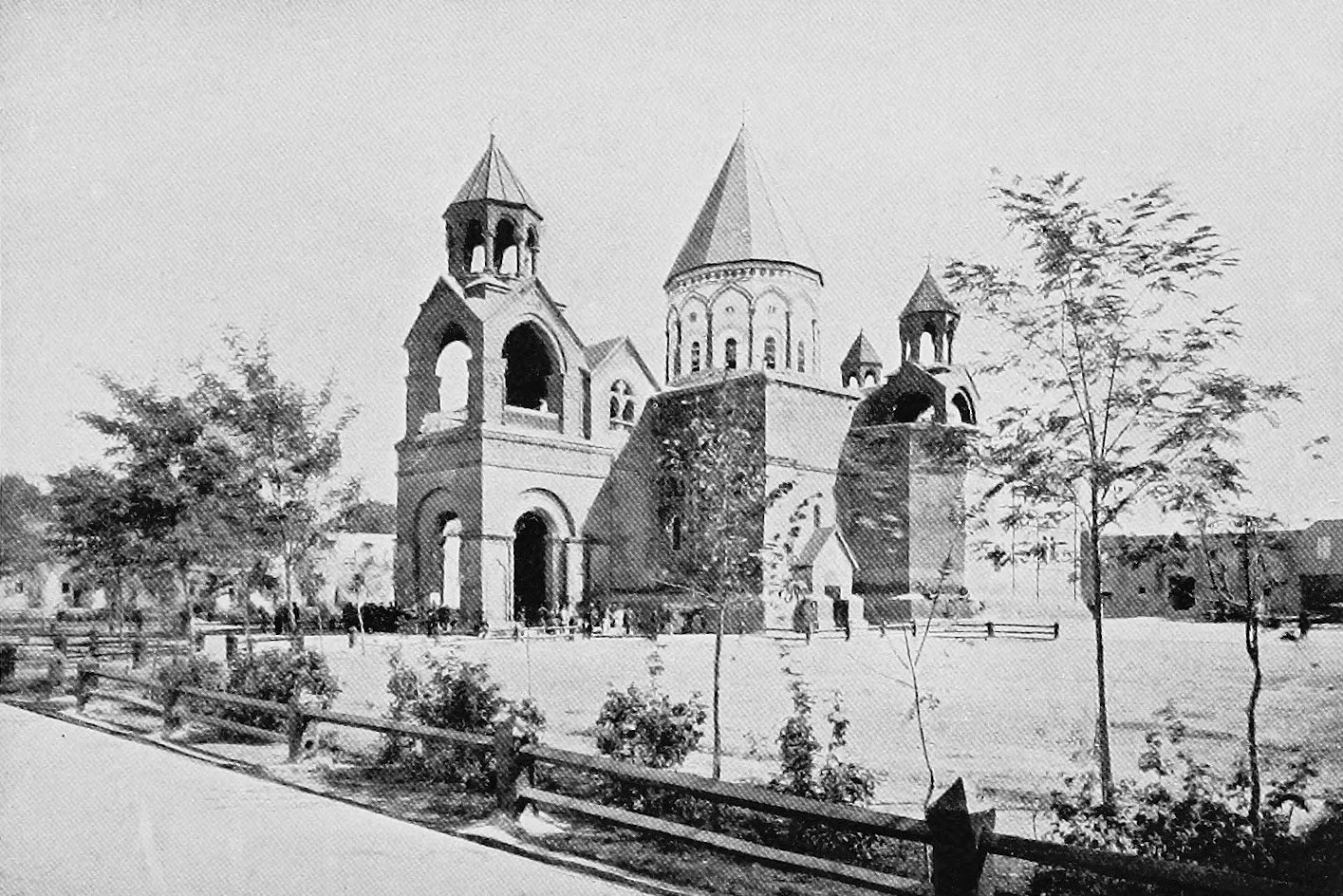
Echmiatsin, c. 1910

In 1903, the Russian government issued an edict to confiscate the properties of the Armenian Church, including the treasures of Echmiatsin. Russian policemen and soldiers entered and occupied the cathedral. Due to popular resistance and the personal defiance of Catholicos Mkrtich Khrimian, the edict was canceled in 1905.

During the Armenian genocide, the cathedral of Echmiatsin and its surrounding became a major center for Turkish Armenian refugees. At the end of 1918, there were about 70,000 refugees in the Echmiatsin district. A hospital and an orphanage within the cathedral's grounds were established and maintained by the U.S.-based Armenian Near East Relief by 1919.

In the spring of 1918 the cathedral was in danger of an attack by the Turks. Prior to the May 1918 Battle of Sardarabad, which took place just miles away from the cathedral, the civilian and military leadership of Armenia suggested Catholicos Gevorg (George) V to leave for Byurakan for security purposes, but he refused. The Armenian forces eventually repelled the Turkish offensive and set the foundations of the First Republic of Armenia.

=== Soviet period ===
==== Suppression ====
After two years of independence, Armenia was Sovietized in December 1920. During the 1921 February Uprising Echmiatsin was briefly (until April) taken over by the nationalist Armenian Revolutionary Federation, which had dominated the pre-Soviet Armenian government between 1918 and 1920.

In December 1923, the southern apse of the cathedral collapsed. It was restored under Toros Toramanian's supervision in what was the first case of restoration of an architectural monument in Soviet Armenia.

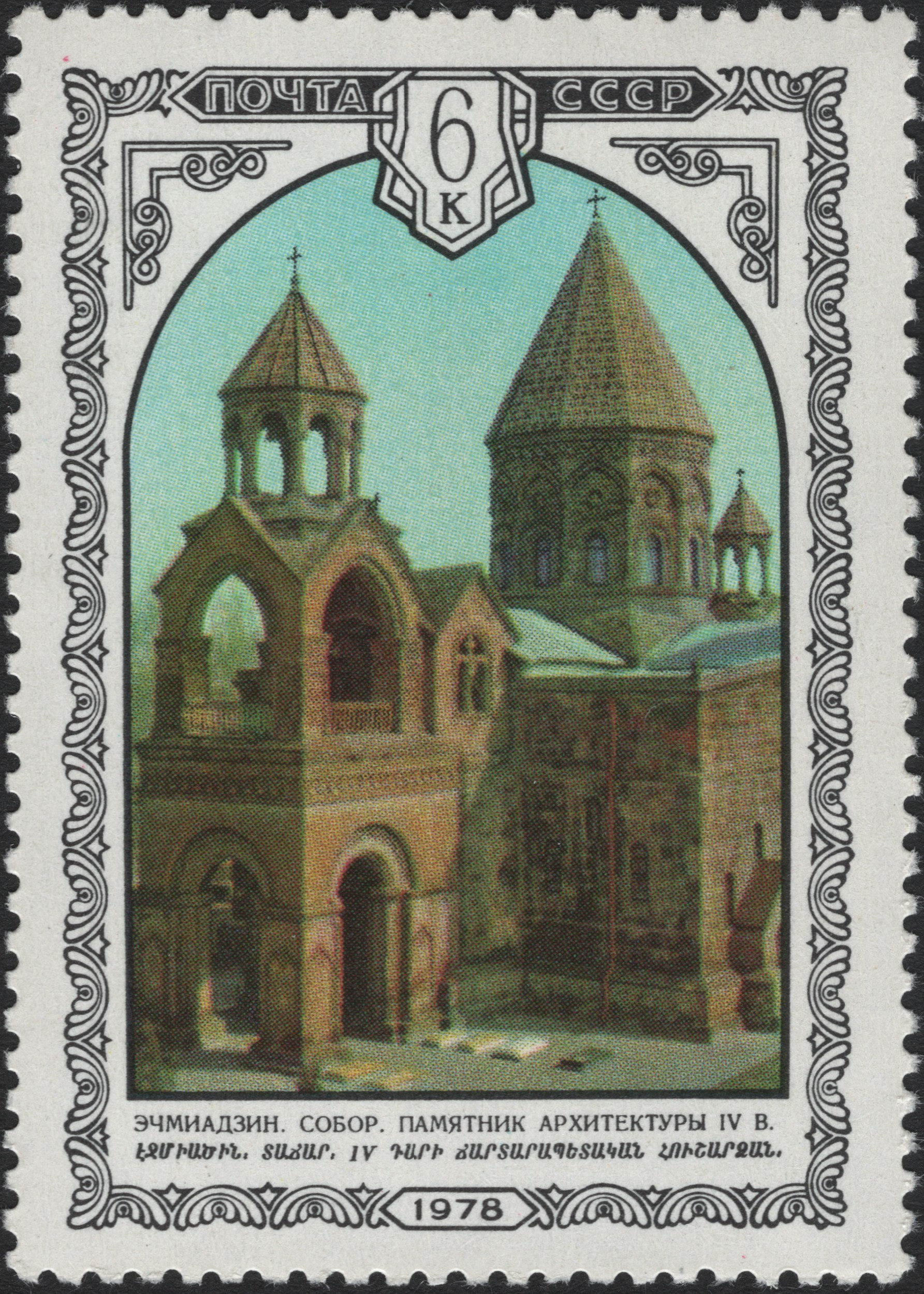
The Soviet government issued a postage stamp depicting the cathedral in 1978.

During the Great Purge and the radical state atheist policies in the late 1930s, the cathedral was a "besieged institution as the campaign was underway to eradicate religion." The repressions climaxed when Catholicos Khoren I was murdered in April 1938 by the NKVD. In August 1938, Soviet Armenian authorities formally resolved to close Echmiatsin, convert it into a museum, and never elect a new Catholicos. However, Soviet Armenian leader Grigory Arutinov referred the decision to Stalin for central confirmation, arguing that Echmiatsin carried international weight and could not be treated as a purely local matter. Within a month, Stalin contacted Arutinov directly and asked whether he still insisted on closing the Catholicosate. Arutinov said he did not insist and the matter was closed. The Soviet leadership valued the Catholicosate primarily as a instrument of influence over the Armenian diaspora. Isolated from the outside world, the cathedral barely continued to function and its administrators were reduced to some twenty people. It was reportedly the only church in Soviet Armenia not to have been seized by the Communist government. The dissident anti-Soviet Armenian diocese in the U.S. wrote that "the great cathedral became a hollow monument."

==== Revival ====
Echmiatsin slowly recovered its religious importance during World War II. The Holy See's official magazine resumed publication in 1944, while the seminary was reopened in September 1945. In 1945 Catholicos Gevorg VI was elected after the seven-year vacancy of the position. The number of baptisms conducted at Echmiatsin rose greatly: from 200 in 1949 to around 1,700 in 1951. Nevertheless, the cathedral's role was downplayed by the Communist official circles. "For them the ecclesiastical Echmiatsin belongs irrevocably to the past, and even if the monastery and the cathedral are occasionally the scene of impressive ceremonies including the election of a new catholicos, this has little importance from the communist point of view," Walter Kolarz wrote in 1961.

Echmiatsin revived under Catholicos Vazgen I since the Khrushchev Thaw in the mid-1950s, following Stalin's death. Archaeological excavations were held in 1955–56 and in 1959; the cathedral underwent a major renovation during this period. Wealthy diaspora benefactors, such as Calouste Gulbenkian and Alex Manoogian, financially assisted the renovation of the cathedral. Gulbenkian alone provided $400,000 (equivalent to $5,000,000 in 2025).

=== Independent Armenia ===
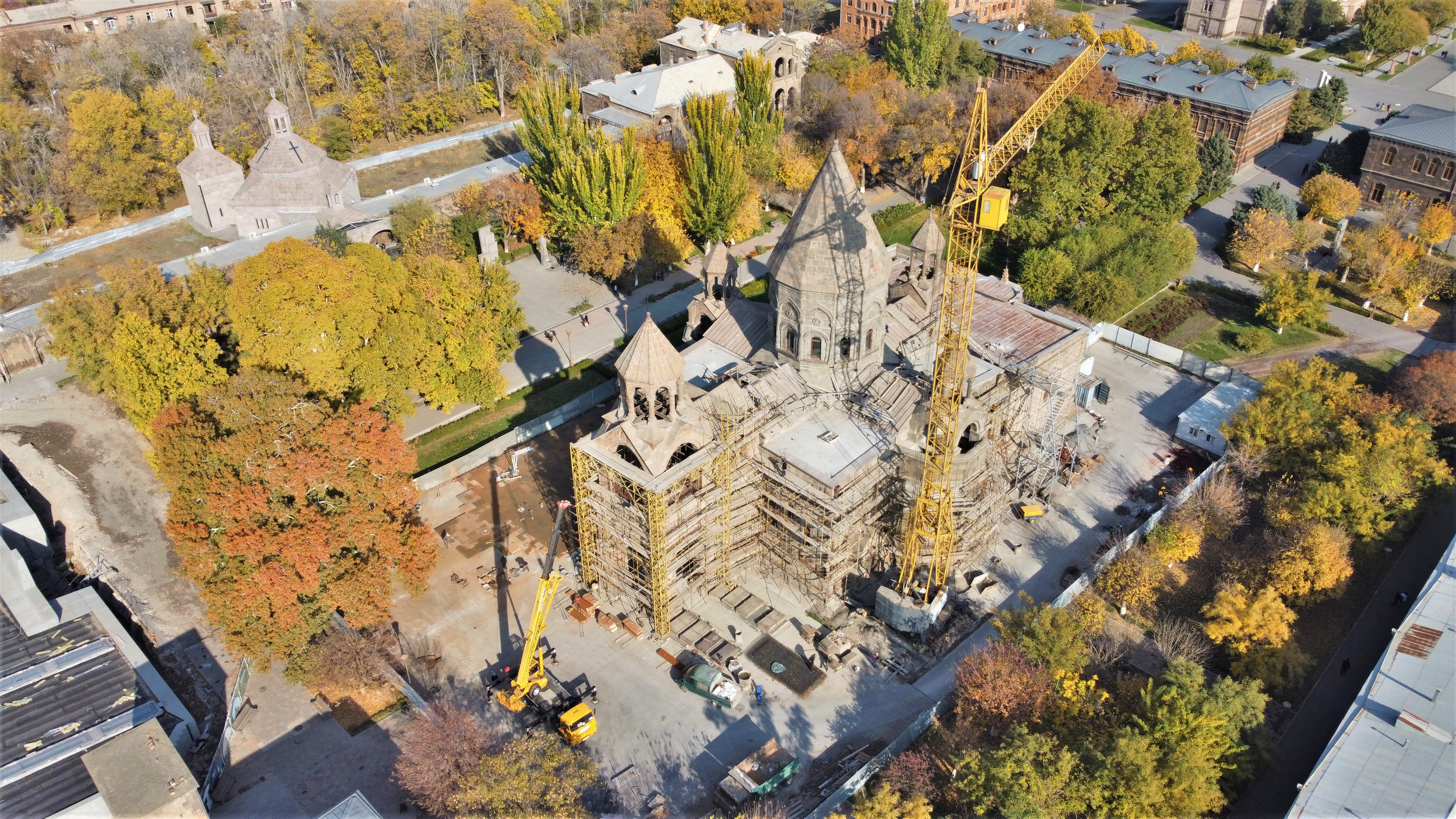
An aerial view of the cathedral undergoing restoration in 2021

In 2000, Echmiatsin underwent a renovation prior to the celebrations of the 1700th anniversary of the Christianization of Armenia in 2001. Its metal roof was replaced with stone slabs. In 2003, the 1700th anniversary of the consecration of the cathedral was celebrated by the Armenian Church. Catholicos Karekin II declared 2003 the Year of Holy Echmiatsin.

The most recent restoration of the cathedral began in 2012, focusing on strengthening and restoring the dome and roof. Its ceremonial reopening took place on September 29, 2024, with senior officials in attendance, including Prime Minister Nikol Pashinyan. The main benefactors, including diaspora billionaires Noubar Afeyan and Samvel Karapetyan, who had funded to the renovation, were honored by Catholicos Karekin II.

The initial goal was to address the external structure, primarily repairing roof tiles, but significant issues with the cathedral's physical condition were subsequently uncovered. Critical structural elements, including columns, arches, the dome, and vaults, were found to be severely deteriorated. Restoration efforts employed high-quality materials, such as injection compounds, waterproofing agents, and mortar, most of which were imported from Italy. Additionally, the frescoes and painted surfaces, covering 2,600 square metres (28,000 sq ft), were meticulously restored. Its 17th century cross, made of thin brass sheets and in a severely deteriorated condition, was replaced with a bronze one that closely replicates its style and size.

== Architecture ==
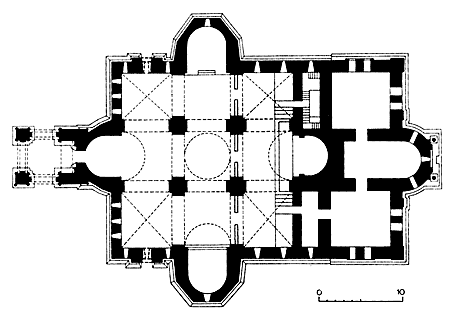
The present-day ground plan of Echmiatsin

=== Style ===
Echmiatsin has a cruciform plan, four free-standing piers, and four projecting apses, which are semicircular on the interior and polygonal on the exterior. Its roof is mostly flat, except the conspicuous central cupola with the typically Armenian conical roof on a polygonal drum and the four small belfries on top of the apses.

Although the cathedral was renovated many times through the centuries and significant additions were made in the 17th and 19th centuries, it largely retains the form of the building constructed in 483/4, especially the floor plan. The fifth-century building is the core of the cathedral, while the stone cupola, turrets, belfry, and rear extension are later additions. According to Varazdat Harutyunyan, its dome was originally wooden and was replaced with a stone one in a subsequent renovation. Portions of the northern and eastern walls of the original building have survived. Alexander Sahinian argued that Echmiatsin holds a unique position in Armenian (and non-Armenian) architecture history because it reproduces features of different periods of Armenian architecture. It makes the building of "immense architectural interest." Researchers have noted the difficulty (even impossiblity) to determine the original structure from which the surviving form evolved through successive additions and alterations over time; Christina Maranci has argued that its many rebuildings make it "extremely difficult to analyze."

In the West, its style has traditionally (Note: In the 19th century, Armenian architecture was usually seen as a "provincial extension of Byzantine architecture" and Byzantine influence was "somewhat exaggerated by 19th century archeologists.") been described as Byzantine or linked to Byzantine architecture. (Note: Its architectural style has been described as Byzantine by Murray's Handbook for Travellers, Richard Phené Spiers, Sven Hedin, Günter Bandmann, and "Armeno-Byzantine" by Alfred Dwight Foster Hamlin. John Mason Neale suggested that its original ground plan is "that of an ordinary Byzantine church". August von Haxthausen quoted Nerses V as describing the cupola as Byzantine, "probably [built] by architects from Constantinople a thousand years ago.") Ranuccio Bianchi Bandinelli disagreed, asserting that fourth century Armenian churches, including Echmiatsin, (Note: Bandinelli lists the "cathedrals of Dvin and Echmiadzin, the churches of Kasakh and, possibly, Diraklar.") considerably differ from Justinian-era Byzantine architecture of Constantinople. He argued that they are local creations that borrow technical elements from the East (Hatra, Sarvestan), but are "fundamentally Hellenistic" in their "formal structure and proportional relationships." Similarly, Hewsen suggested that the design of the core of the church is a mixture of a Zoroastrian fire temple and a mausoleum of classical antiquity.

=== Dimensions and appearance ===
The cathedral measures 33 by 30 metres (108 by 98 ft), with its dome rising approximately 34 metres (112 ft). Small by European standards, it is one of the largest churches of its time and one of the largest churches in Armenia. The cathedral's core is built in grey stone, while the 17th century additions in bright red.

19th century British visitors James Bryce and H. F. B. Lynch were not impressed by its architecture. Robert Ker Porter found it "rude" compared to even the "roughest" English Gothic churches. A National Geographic writer described it as an "austere and commanding work", while two Soviet authors described it as a "massive cube surmounted by a faceted cone on a simple cylinder." Robert H. Hewsen noted that it is "neither the largest nor the most beautiful of Armenian churches", nevertheless, "the overall impression presented by the ensemble is inspiring, and Armenians hold the building in great reverence." The rear extension, added by Catholicos Gevorg IV in 1868, was criticized by 19th century visitors for being out of harmony with the rest of the church.

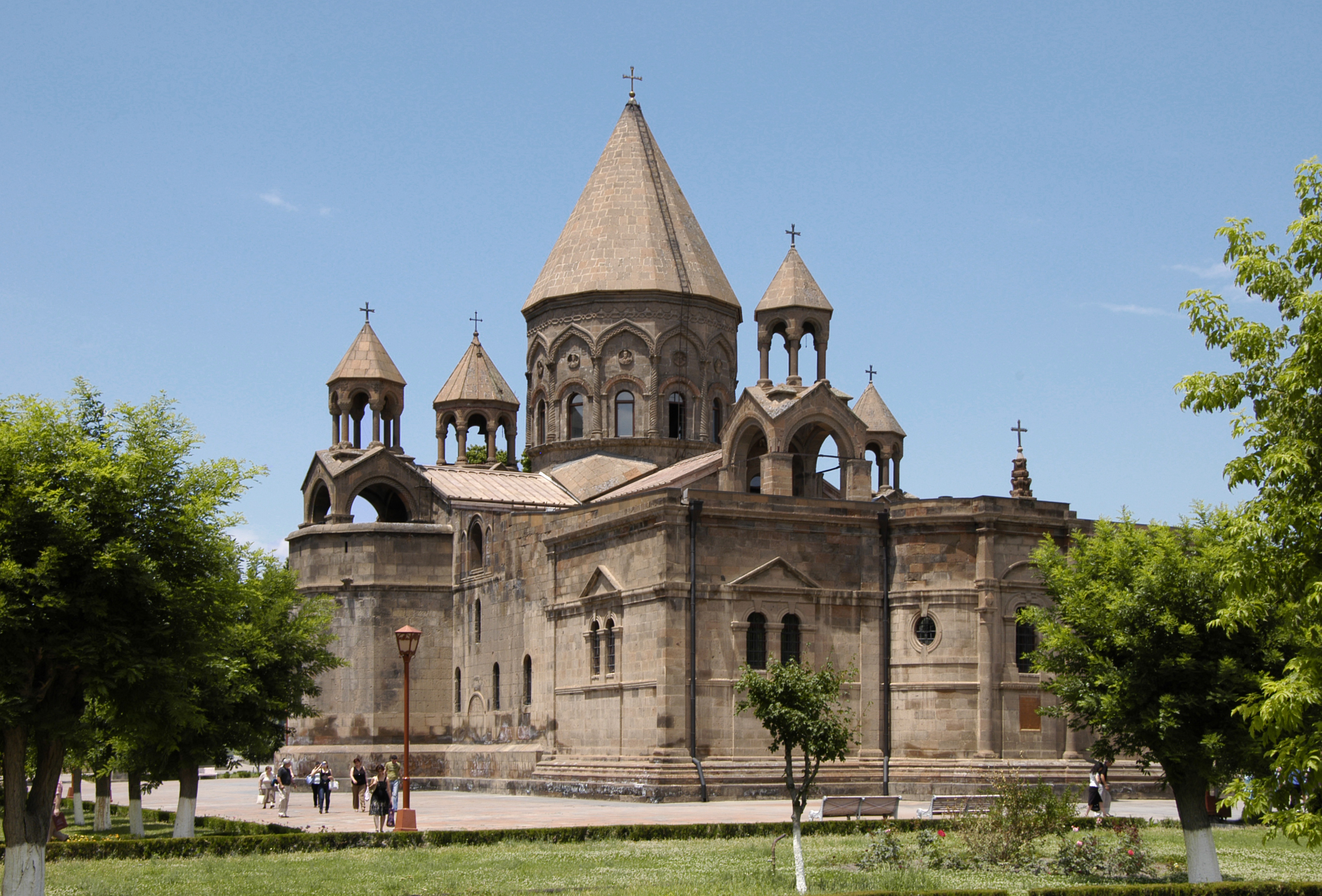
View of the cathedral from the south-east

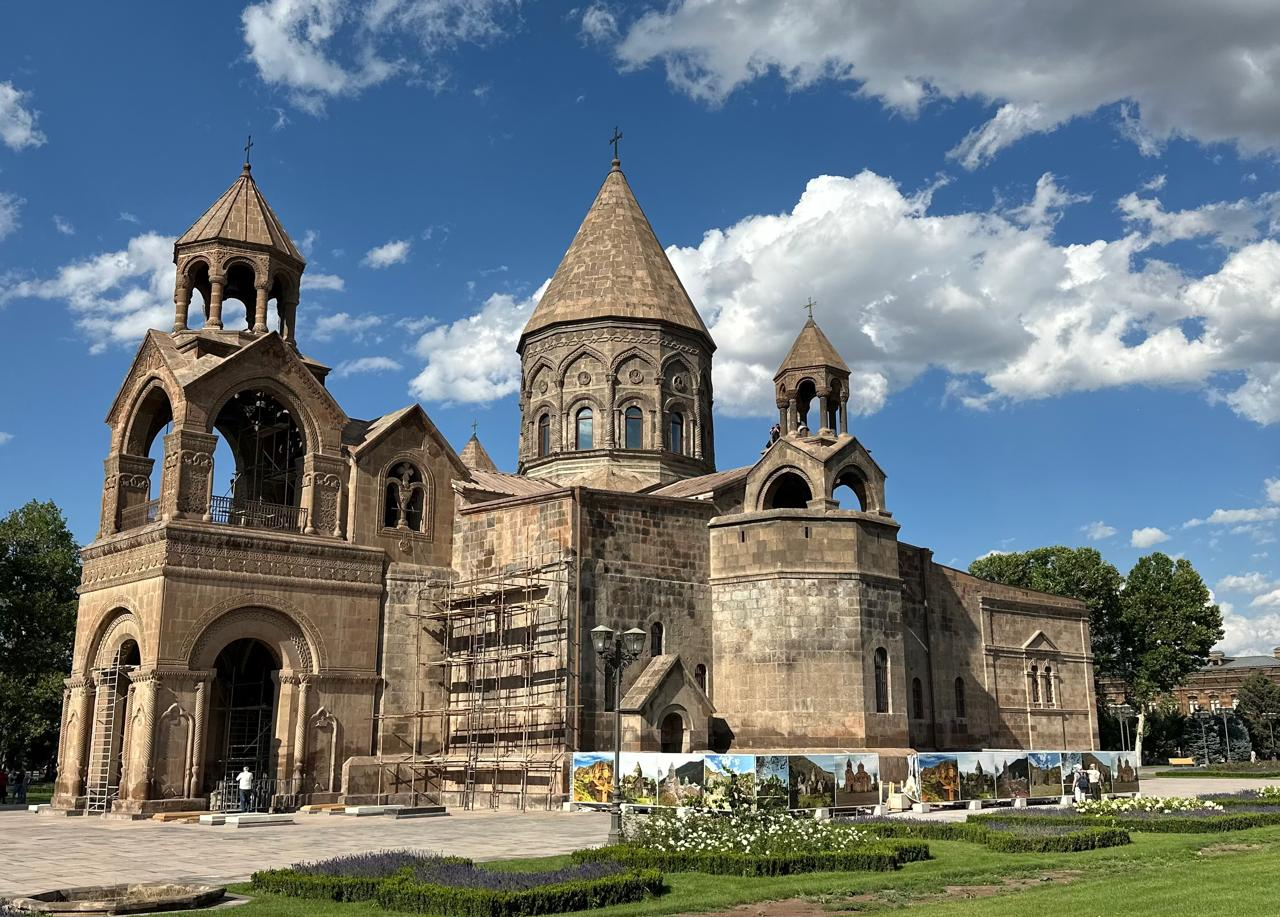
Echmiatsin cathedral view in 2024

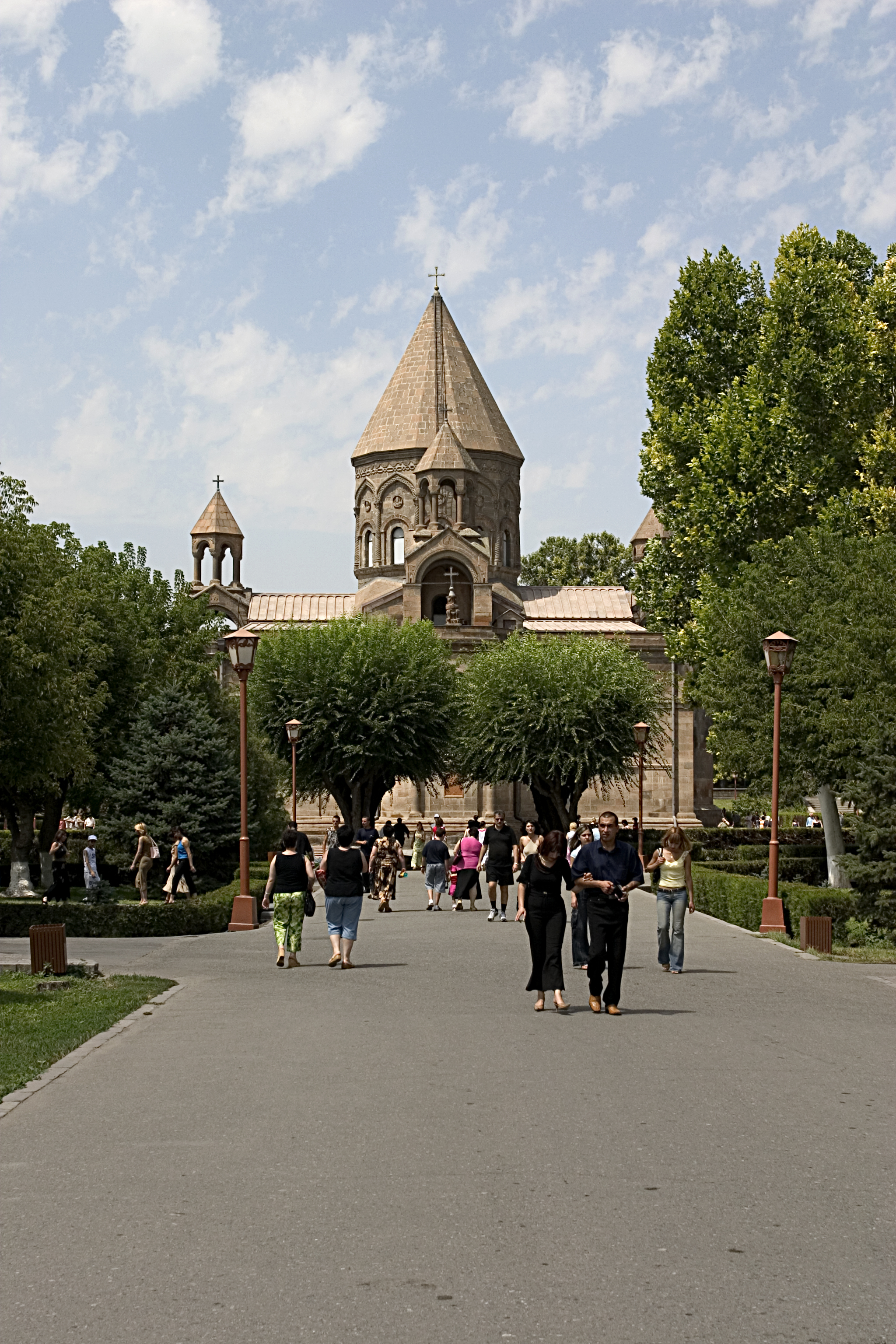
Side view

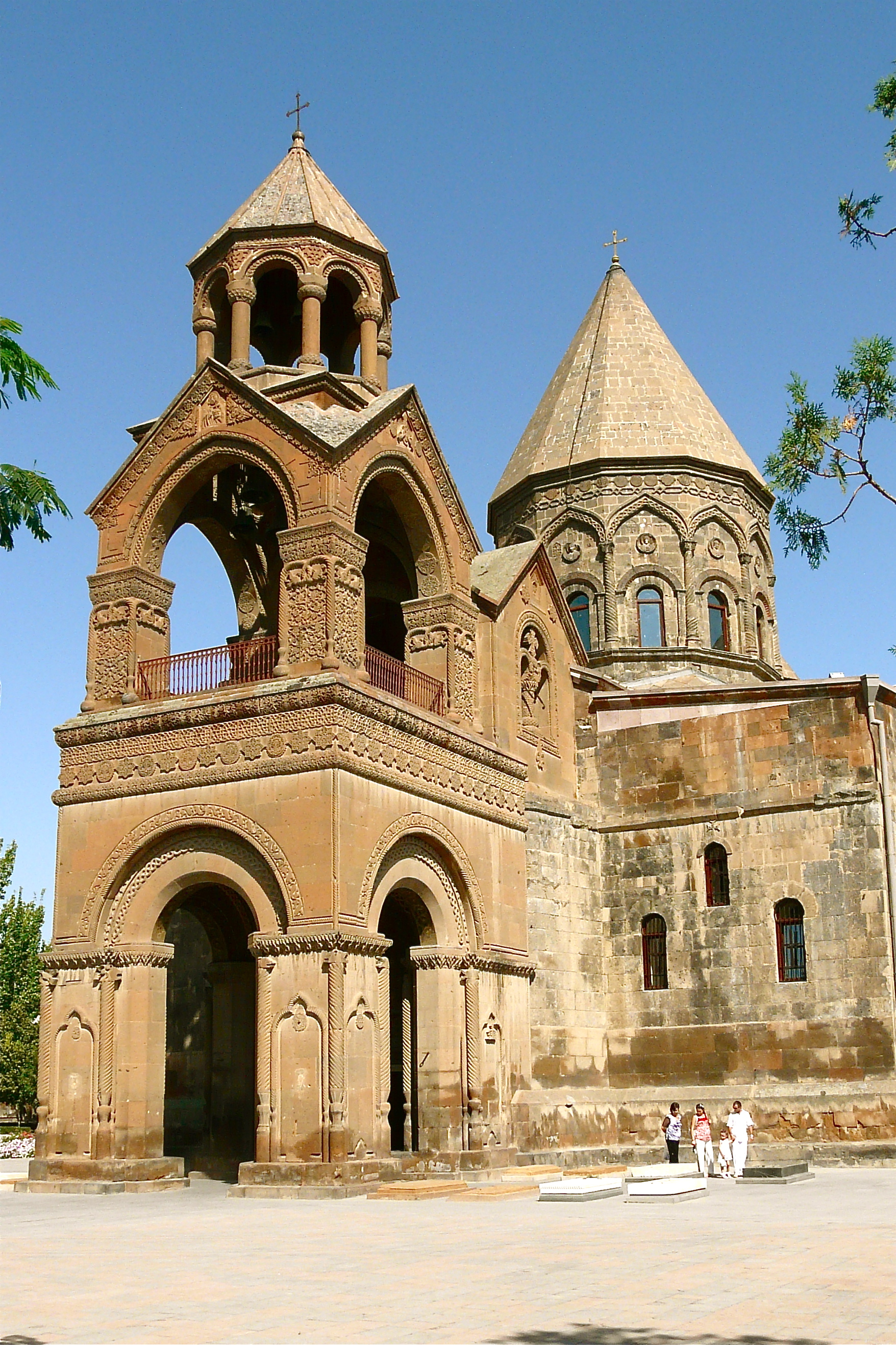
The bell tower

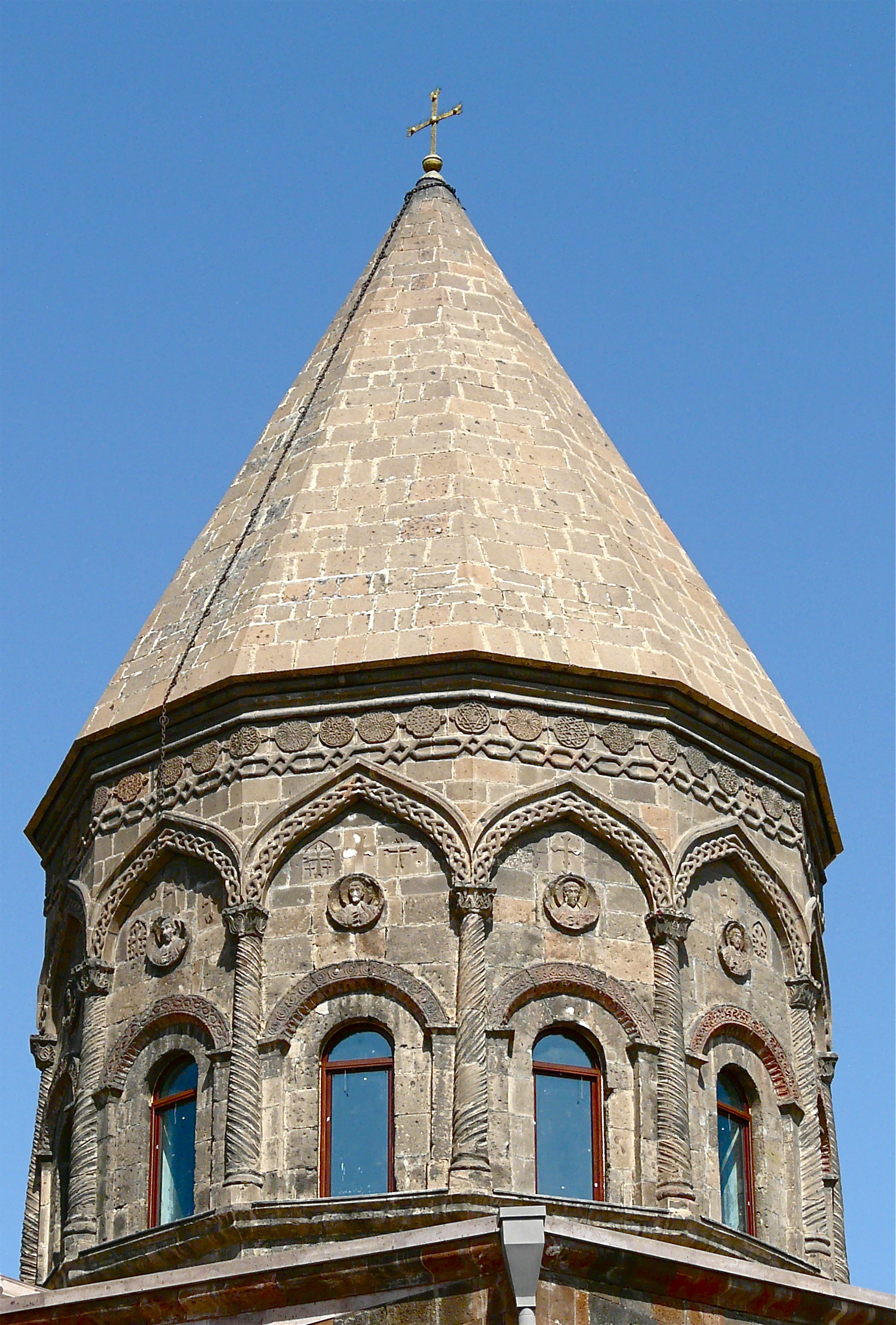
The dome

=== Reliefs ===
The exterior contains extensive decorative geometric and floral patterns as well as blind arcades and medallions depicting saints.

The pair of reliefs on the northern facade are the most discussed sculptures of early medieval Armenia. (Note: The stones measure 52 by 69 cm (20 by 27 in) and 47 by 66 cm (19 by 26 in).) One depicts a standing Saint Thecla and Paul the Apostle seated on cross-legged stool. The other contains an equal-armed (Greek cross) with a series of Greek inscriptions that contain several names, including Arxia, Elpid, Daniel, Tirer, and Garikinis, none of whom have been identified. The last two have been interpreted as the Armenian names Tirayr and Garegin.

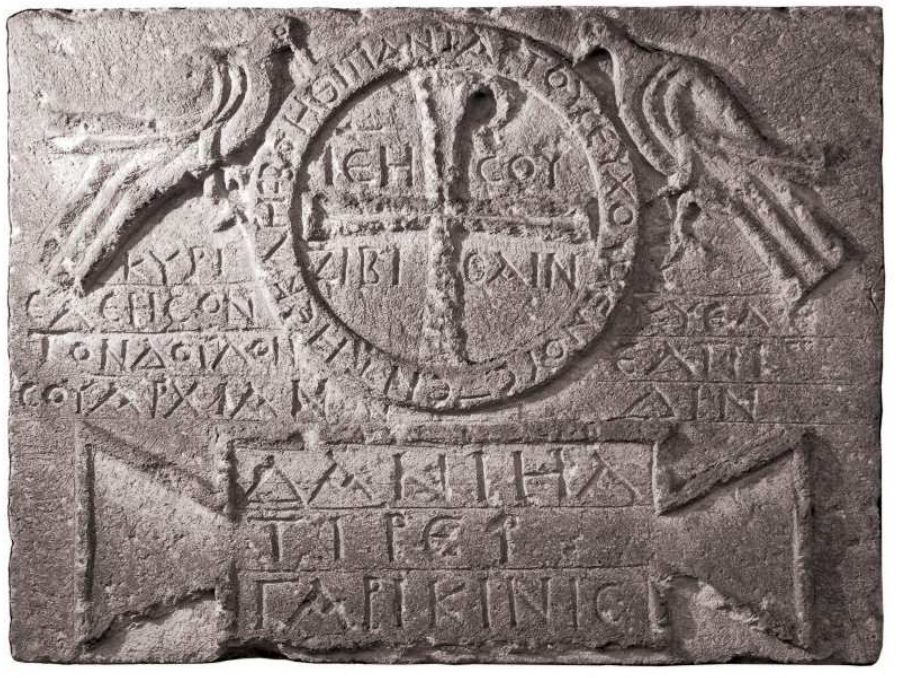

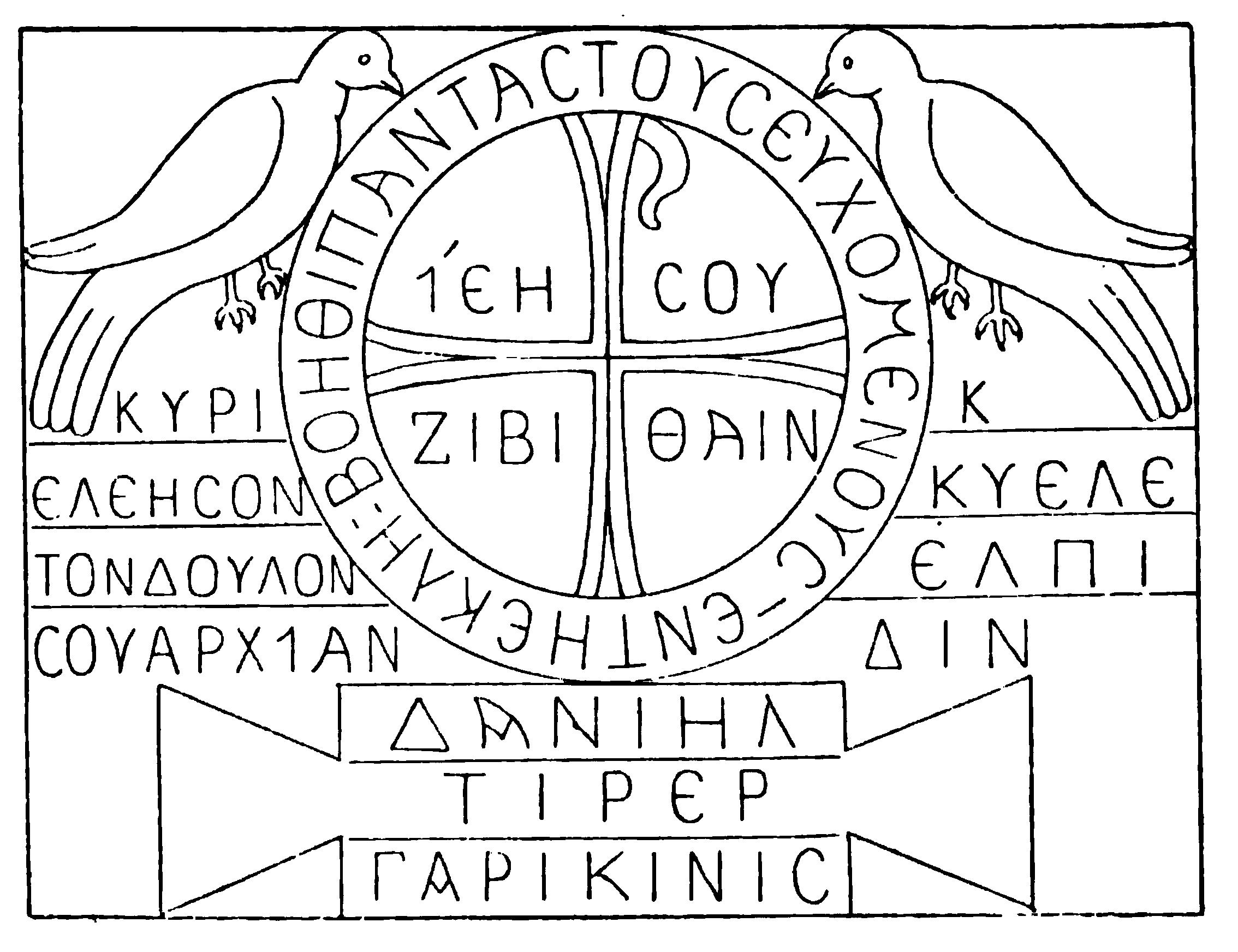

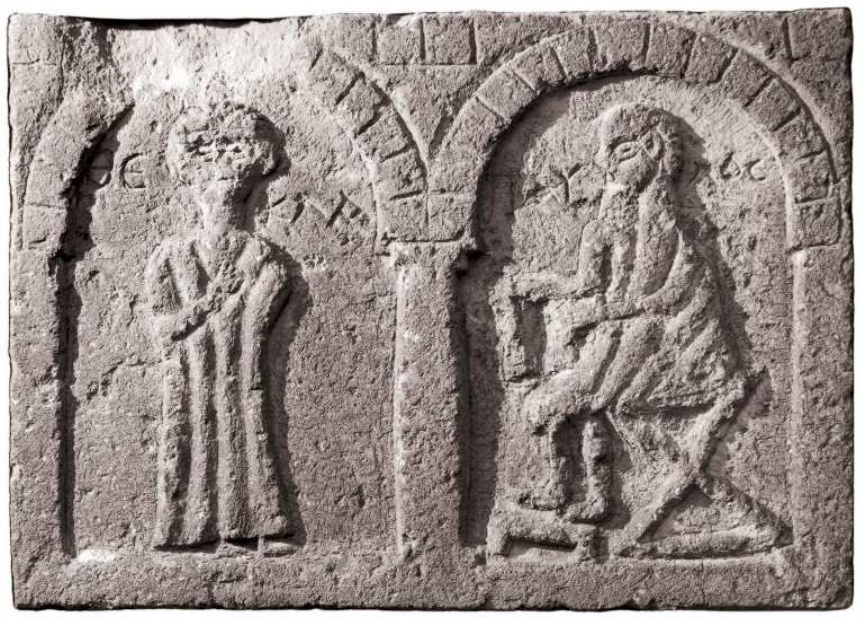

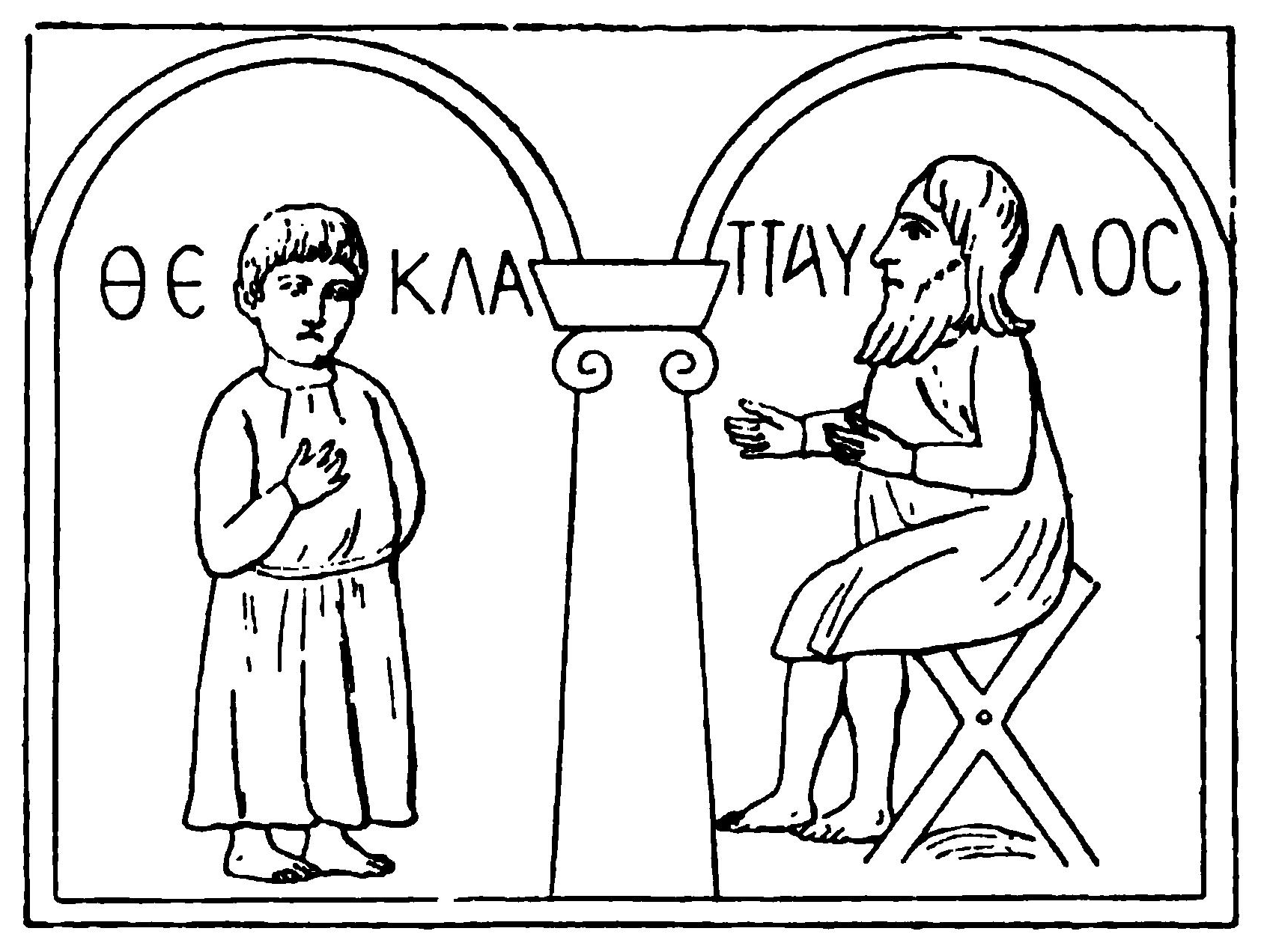

Maranci found the inscription difficult to date. Various scholars have tentatively dated the inscriptions between the first and sixth centuries. Some maintain that that they were created before the invention of the Armenian alphabet c. 405, while Sirarpie Der Nersessian believed that they are from the fifth or sixth century. Armen Khatchatrian dated it to the fifth century, which and Timothy Greenwood accepted. Grigoryan insisted that the reliefs were created in the early fourth century and were part of the original building of Gregory the Illuminator. According to Hasratyan, they are the earliest reliefs on the cathedral's walls and among the earliest examples of Christian Armenian sculpture.

reliefs and ornaments on the western (main) belfry

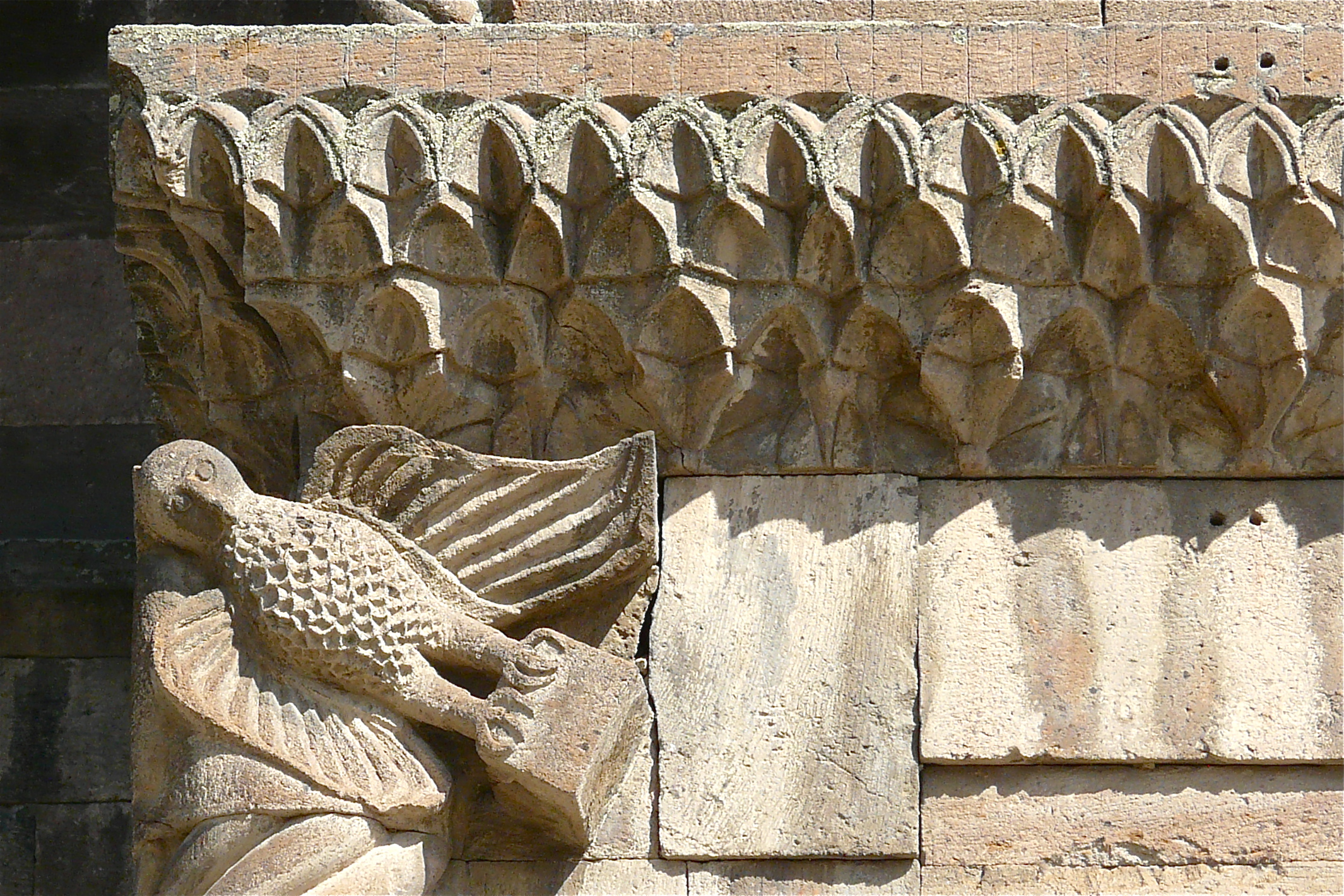
Relief of a winged creature

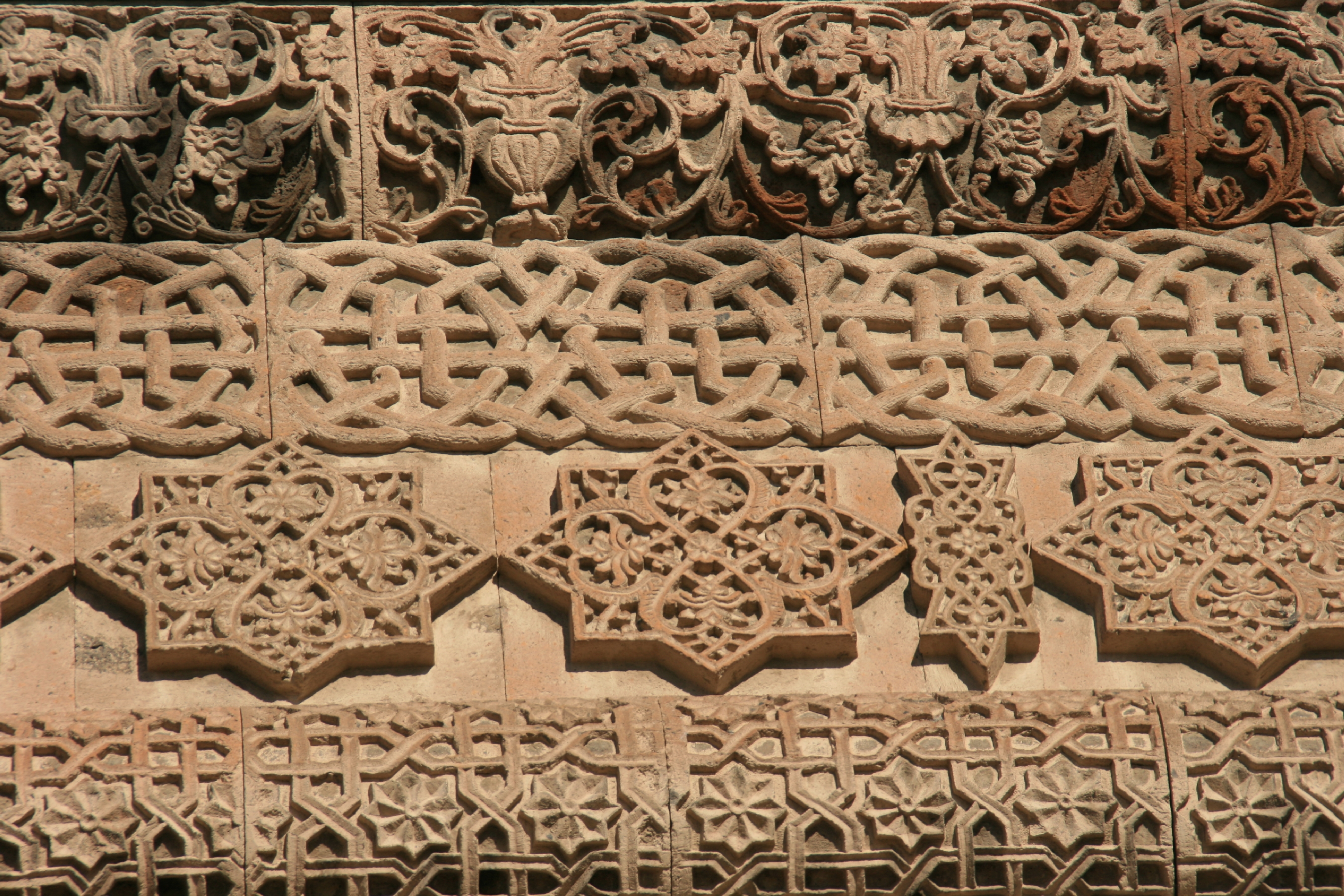
Ornaments

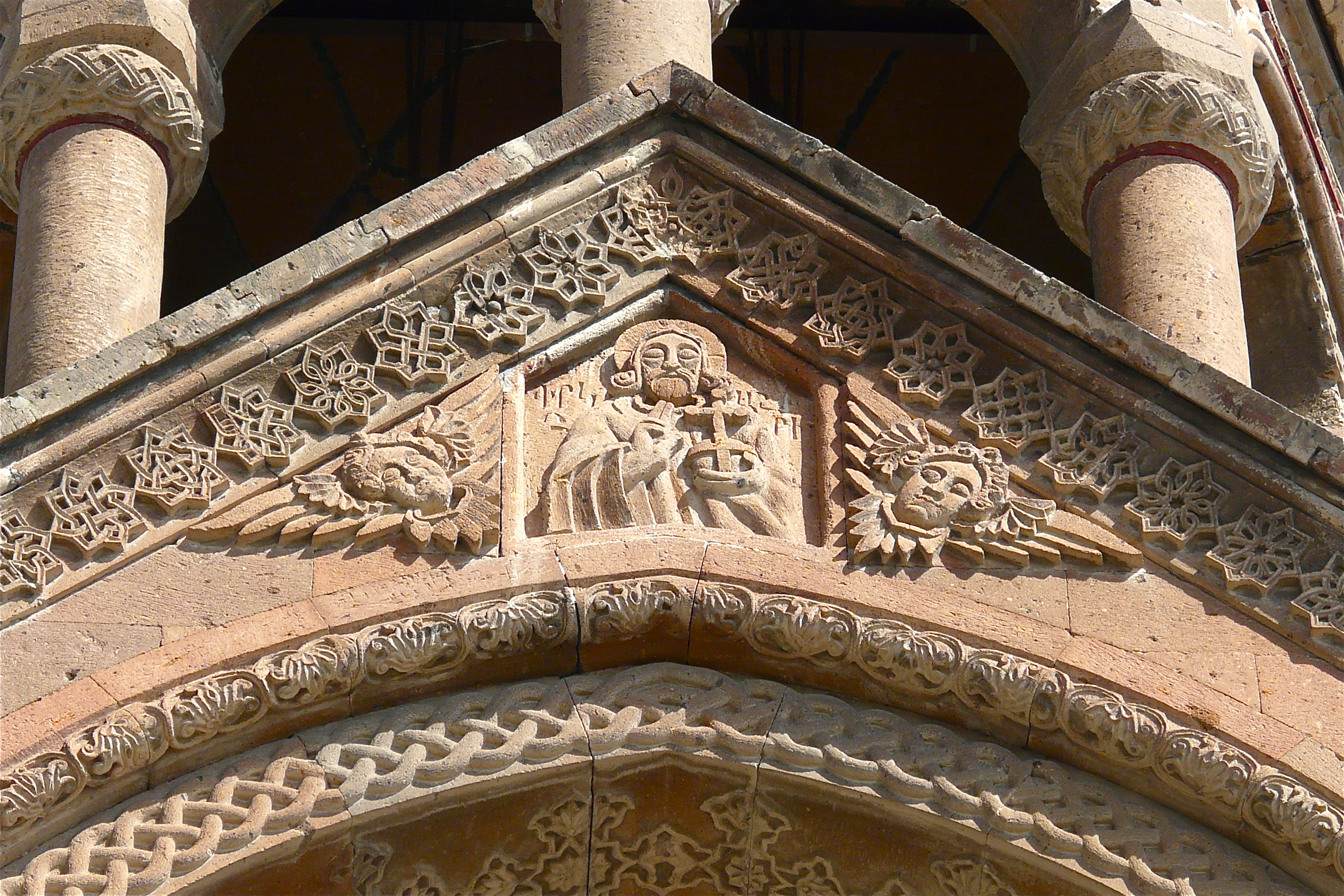
A relief depicting the Christ

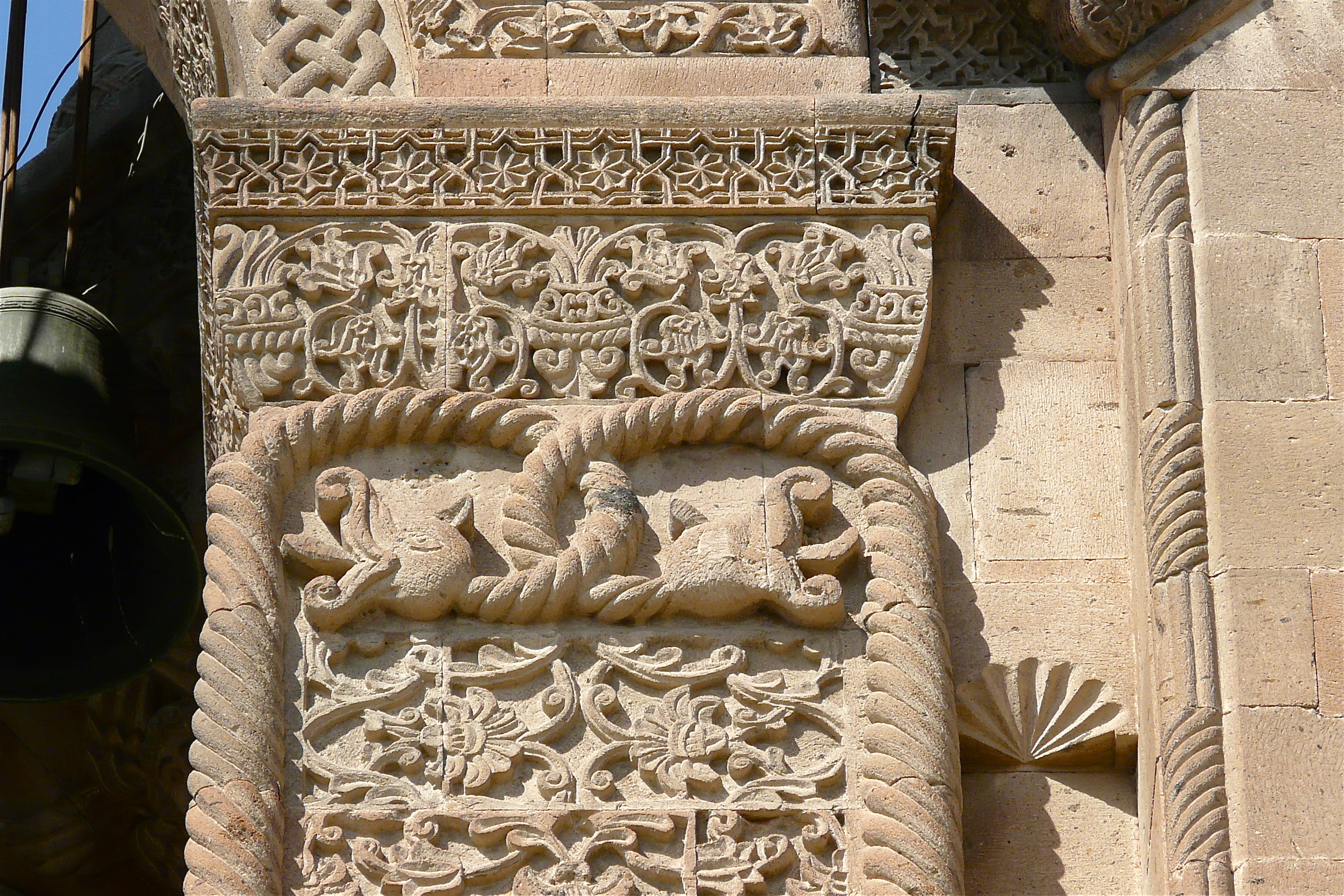
Ornaments

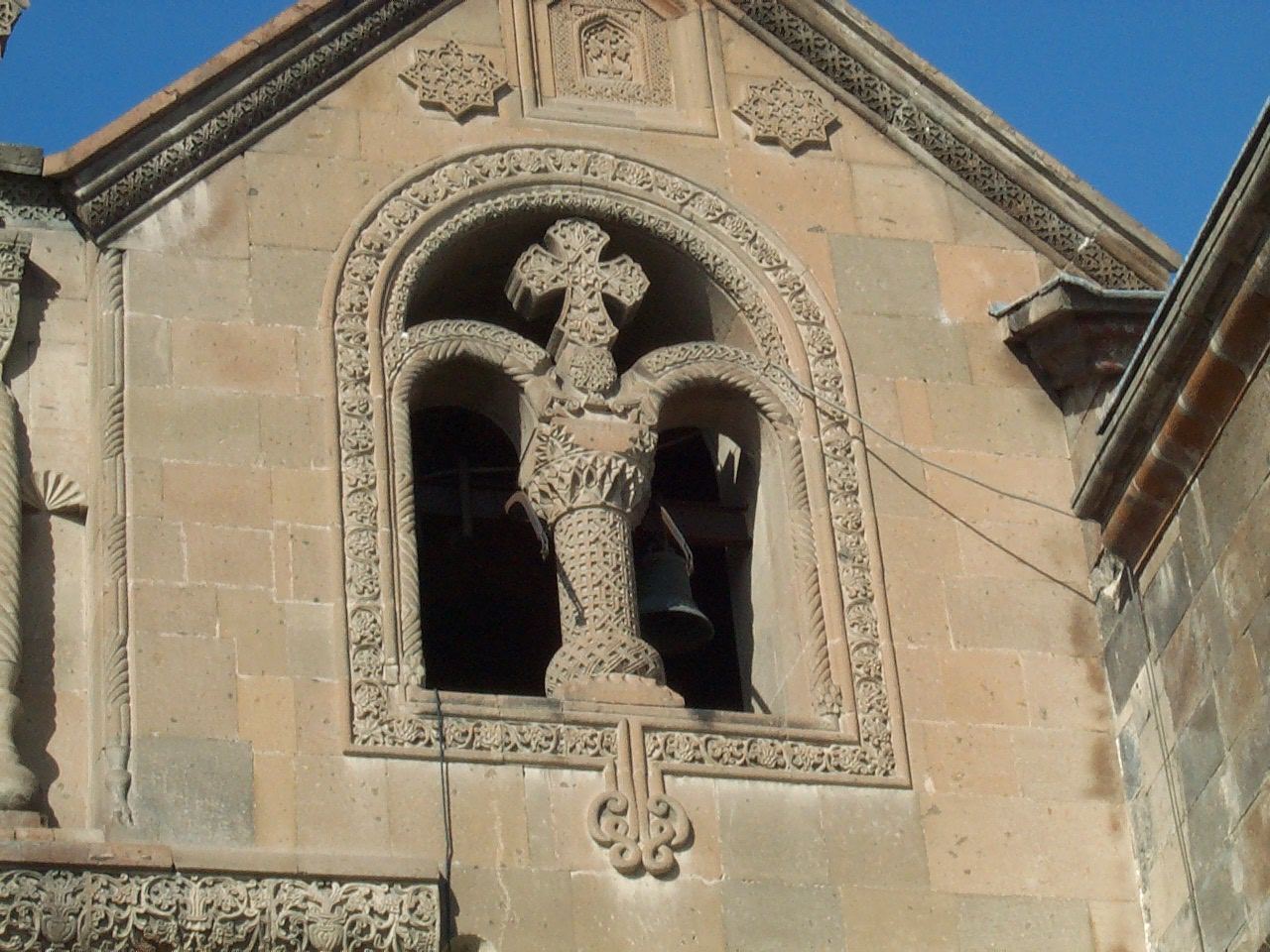
A cross sculpture

=== Tibetan bell ===
The 17th century bell tower previously housed a bell with a Tibetan Buddhist inscription, which was reported by foreign travelers and scholars throughout the 19th century. (Note: Starting as early as 1837 by Marie-Félicité Brosset.) According to Simon Maghakyan, the bell was removed in the late 1930s by the Soviets and has disappeared without a trace. The inscription survives as a copy in an 1890 book by Ghevont Alishan:

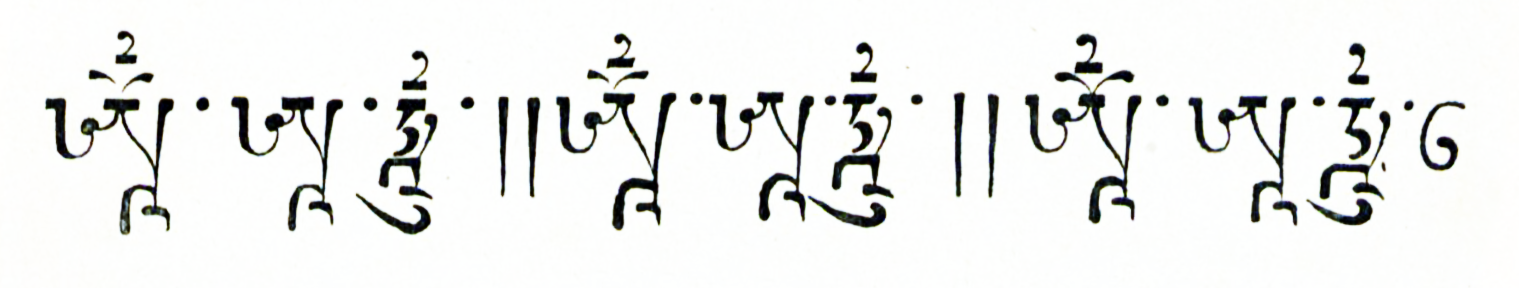

Dan Martin, a scholar of Tibet, wrote that the three-syllable mantra oṃ aḥ hūṃ, repeated thrice on the bell, is ubiquitous in Secret Mantra Buddhism and is used for blessing offerings. He argued that the inscription suggests that the bell was a consecrated Buddhist object. An evidence of Armenian contacts with Buddhism, the bell, Hewsen suggested, was "probably the long-forgotten gift of some Mongol or Ilkhanid khan." Martin proposed an alternative theory; suggesting that the bell may have originally been housed at a Buddhist temple in the area and was later salvaged and transferred to Echmiatsin or may have been brought from Lhasa to Armenia by New Julfa merchants in the 17th century, around the time the bell tower was built.

=== Interior ===
Echmiatsin's interior is extensively decorated with Persian-influenced frescoes. They depict flowers, birds, scrollwork, arabesque ornamentations. Bryce and Villari found the interior impressive, while Lynch called it "sufficiently remarkable". Porter found the interior "dark and gloomy" with the "ill-drawn, and worse-coloured" paintings and "dingy fresco" adding to the "gloom, without increasing the solemnity." Telfer described it as "gloomy, ineffective, and entirely deficient in any fascinating touches of architectural force and decoration". Bryce said it had a "certain sombre dignity, and an air of hoar antiquity about everything."

Stepanos Lehatsi (Stephen of Poland) painted the belfry in 1664. The early frescoes inside the cathedral were restored in the 18th century. In the 18th and 19th centuries, Armenian painters created frescoes of scenes from the old testament and Armenian saints. Naghash Hovnatan painted parts of the interior between 1712 and 1721. His paintings on the dome and the painting of the Mother of God under the altar have survived to this day. Other members of the prominent Hovnatanian family (Hakob, Harutyun and Hovnatan) created paintings throughout the 18th century. Their work was continued by the succeeding generations of the same family (Mkrtum and Hakob) in the 19th century.

The wooden doors of the cathedral were carved in Tiflis in 1889. The paintings were moved out of the cathedral by the order of Catholicos Mkrtich Khrimian in 1891 and are now kept in various museums in Armenia, including the National Gallery of Armenia. The frescoes inside the cathedral were restored by Lydia Durnovo in 1956, and in 1981–82 by Vardges Baghdasaryan. In the 1950s, the stone floor was replaced with one of marble.

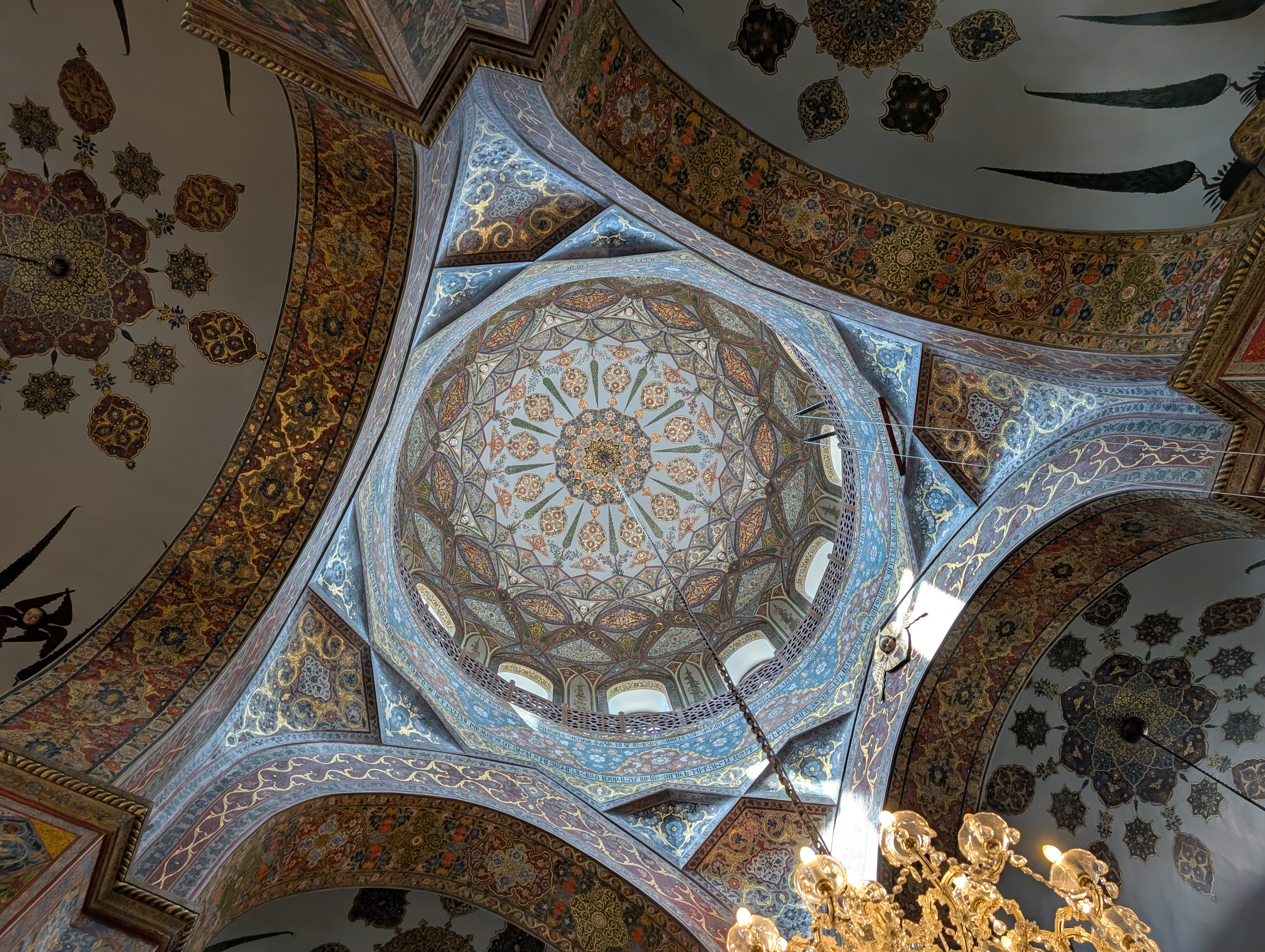
The cupola

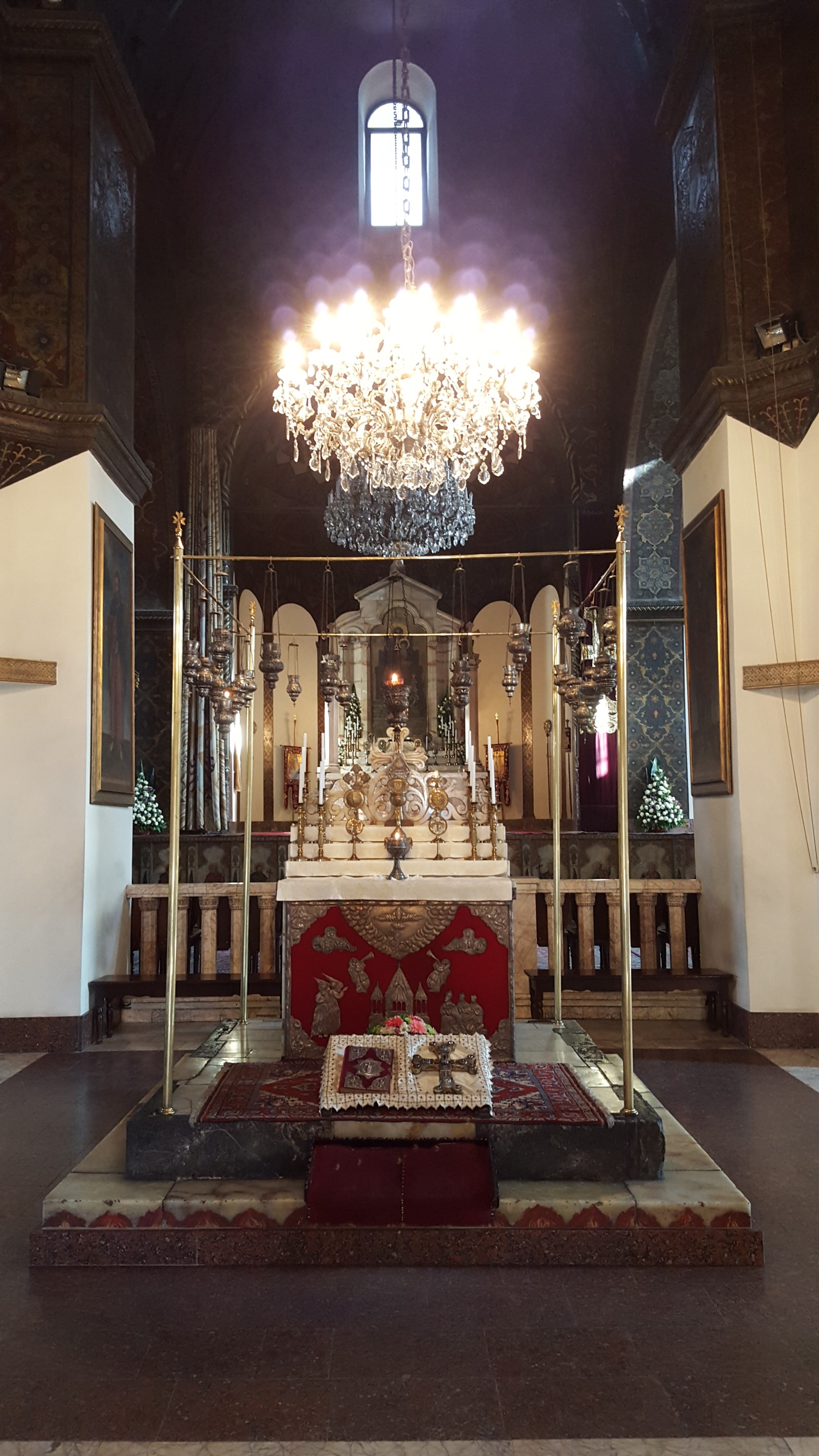
The interior

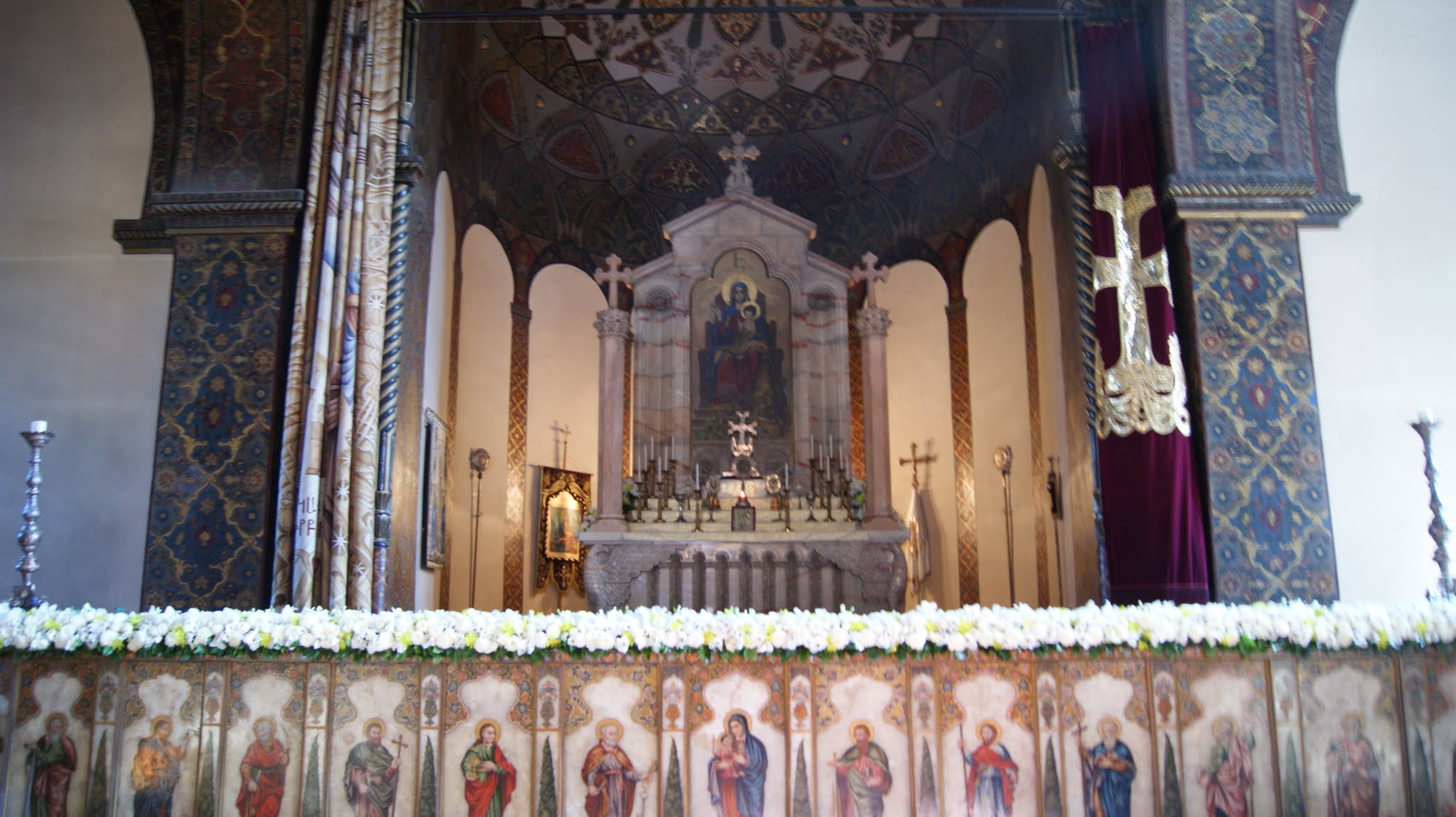
The altar

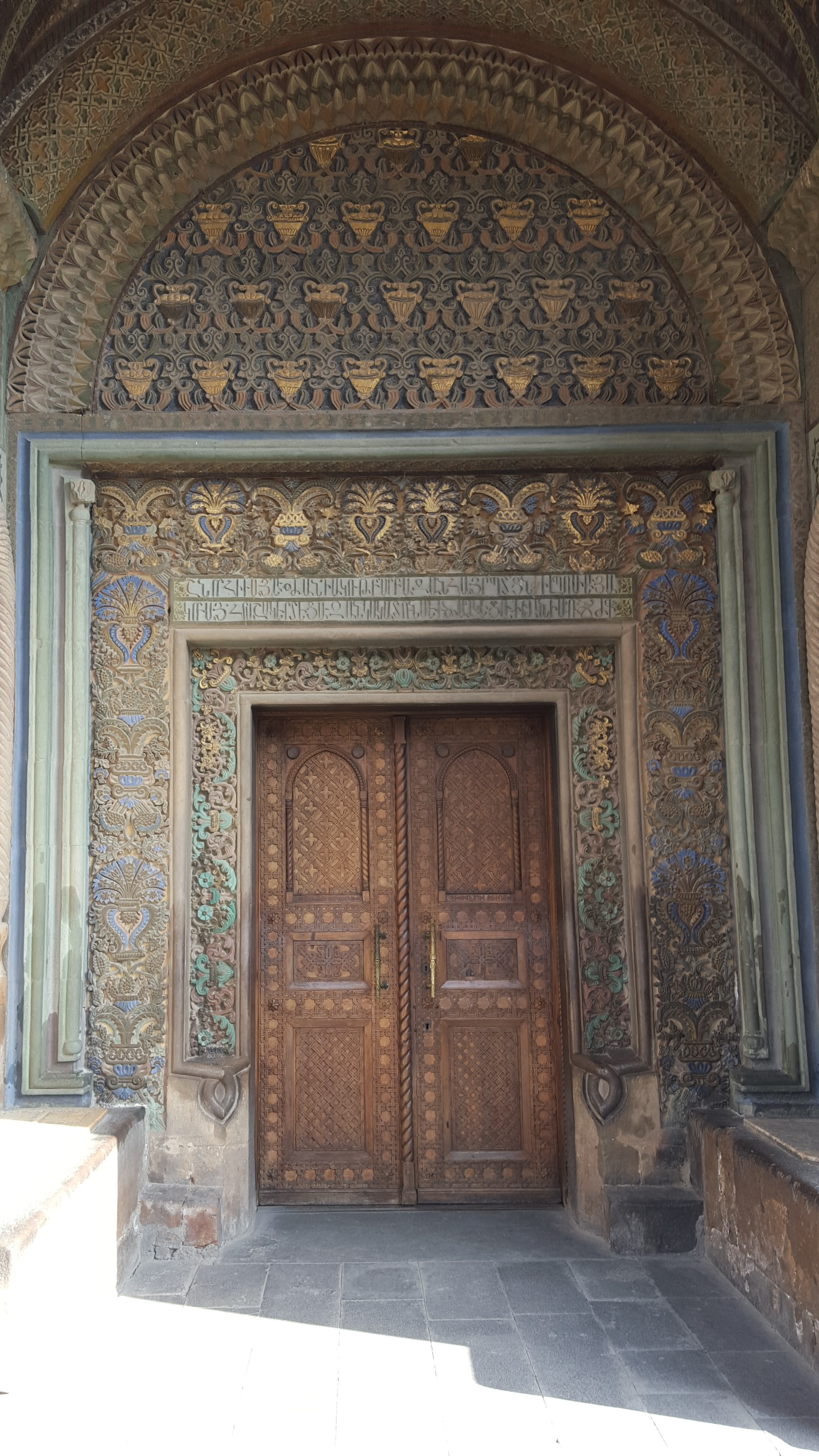
The main entrance

=== Influence ===
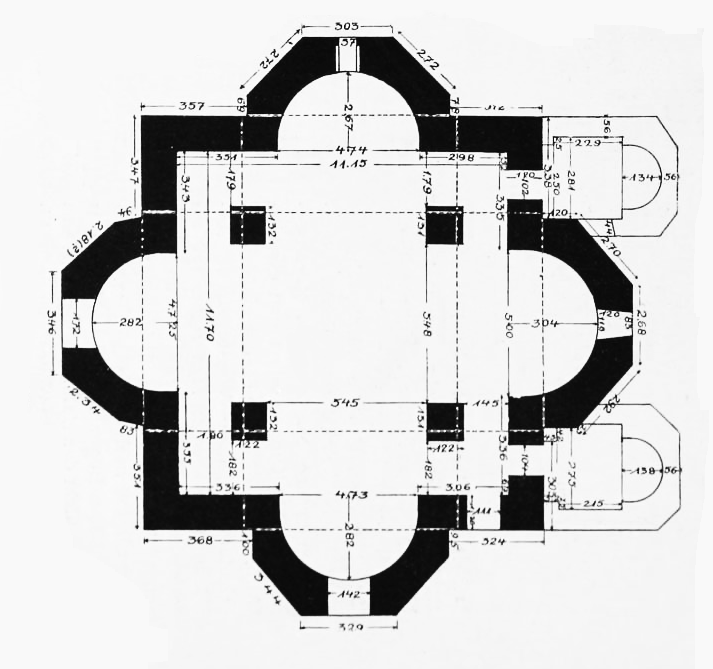
The plan of the Bagaran cathedral

The plan of Germigny-des-Prés

==== On Armenian architecture ====
The design of the cathedral—classified as a "four-apsed square with ciborium," and called "Echmiatsin-type" in Armenian architectural historiography—was not common in Armenia in the early medieval period. The now-destroyed St. Theodore Church of Bagaran, dating from 624 to 631, was the only known church with a significantly similar plan and structure from that period. Hovhannes Khalpakhchian suggested that the type is also seen in the Mastara Church (c. 600).

In the 19th century, during an architectural revival that looked back to Armenia's past, Echmiatsin's plan was directly copied in new Armenian churches. Some notable examples from this period include the narthex of the St. Thaddeus Monastery in northern Iran, dating from 1811 or 1819 through 1830, and the Ghazanchetsots Cathedral in Shushi, dating from 1868.

Its plan and design also inspired churches in the Armenian diaspora, including in Singapore (1835), Paris (1904), and Bucharest (1911–12).

==== On European architecture ====
Josef Strzygowski, who was the first European to thoroughly study Armenian architecture and place Armenia in the center of European architecture, suggested that several churches and chapels in Western Europe have been influenced by the cathedrals of Echmiatsin and Bagaran due to similarities found within their plans. According to Strzygowski, some examples of churches influenced by Echmiatsin and Bagaran are the 9th-century church of Germigny-des-Prés in France (built by Odo of Metz, an Armenian architect) and San Satiro of Milan, Italy. (Note: "...at Germigny-des-Prés (on the Loire, near Orleans) is an exact reproduction of the Armenian apse-buttressed square with free central pillars, dating from the ninth century. The latter type occurs also at Milan (San Satiro). In both cases the plan closely resembles that of Bagaran in Armenia.") This view was later supported by Alexander Sahinian and Varazdat Harutyunyan. Sahinian suggested that Armenian church architecture was spread in Western Europe in the 8th–9th centuries by the Paulicians, who migrated from Armenia en masse after being suppressed by the Byzantines during the Iconoclasm period. Sahinian added many other medieval churches in Europe, such as the Palatine Chapel of Aachen in Germany, to the list of churches to have been influenced by the cathedrals of Echmiatsin and Bagaran and by Byzantine decorative arts. According to Murad Hasratyan, Echmiatsin's design was spread to Europe via the Eastern Roman Empire and served as a model—besides Germigny-des-Prés and San Satiro—for the Nea Ekklesia church in Constantinople and the churches of Mount Athos in Greece.

== Protection and heritage designation ==
The cathedral and the surrounding complex covers an area of 16.4 hectares (41 acres) and is property of the Armenian Apostolic Church (Mother See of Holy Etchmiadzin). Recognized as a national monument in 1983 by the Soviet Armenian government, this designation was reaffirmed by the government of Armenia in 2002. Joint councils consisting of the Ministry of Culture and the Armenian Apostolic Church are responsible for regulating its conservation, rehabilitation, and usage. In 2000 the UNESCO added Echmiatsin Cathedral, the churches of St. Hripsime, St. Gayane, Shoghakat and the ruined Zvartnots Cathedral to the list of World Heritage Sites. The UNESCO highlights that the cathedral and churches "graphically illustrate the evolution and development of the Armenian central-domed cross-hall type of church, which exerted a profound influence on architectural and artistic development in the region."

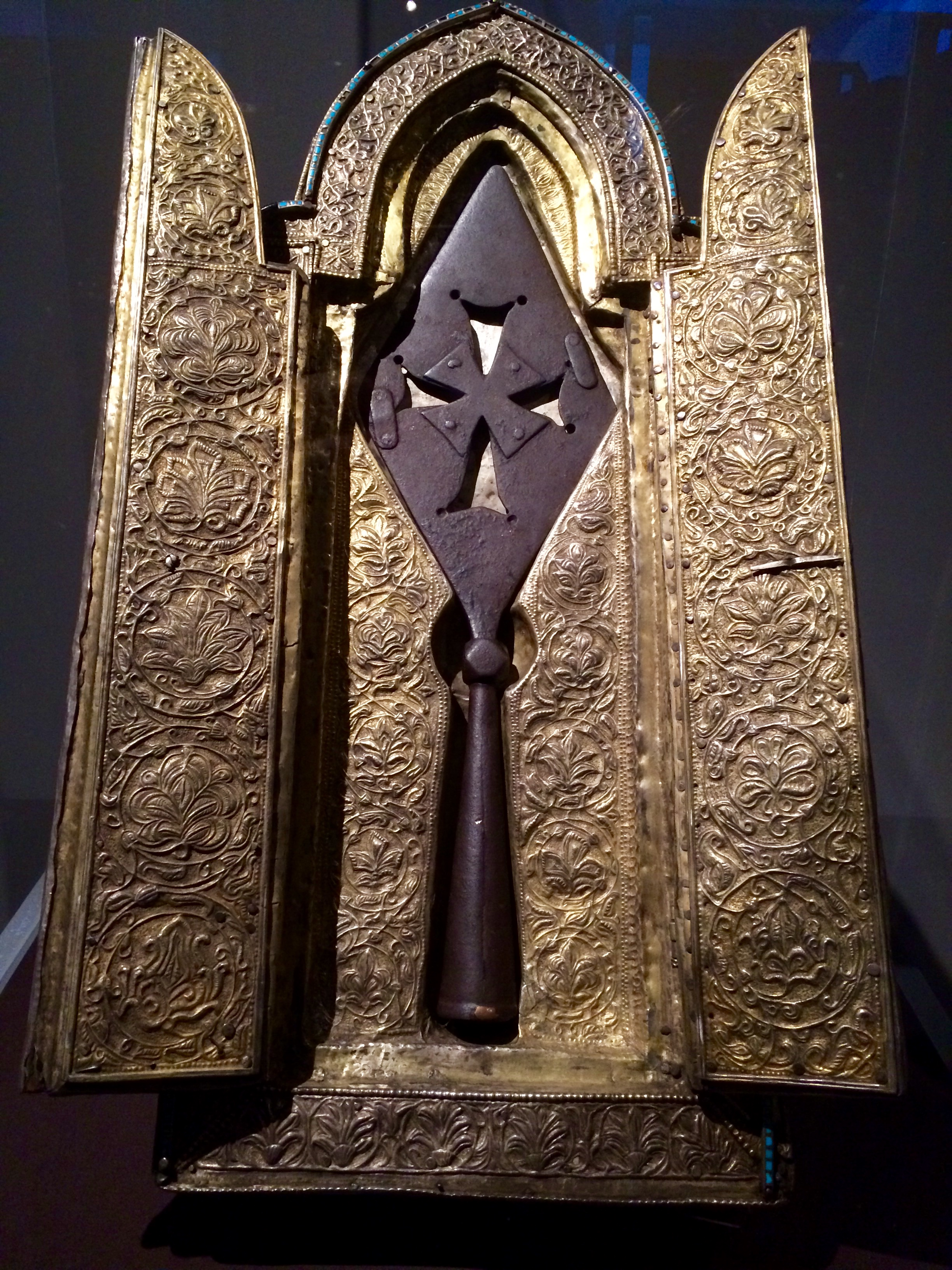
The Holy Lance during an exhibition at the Metropolitan Museum of Art (2018)

== Relics ==
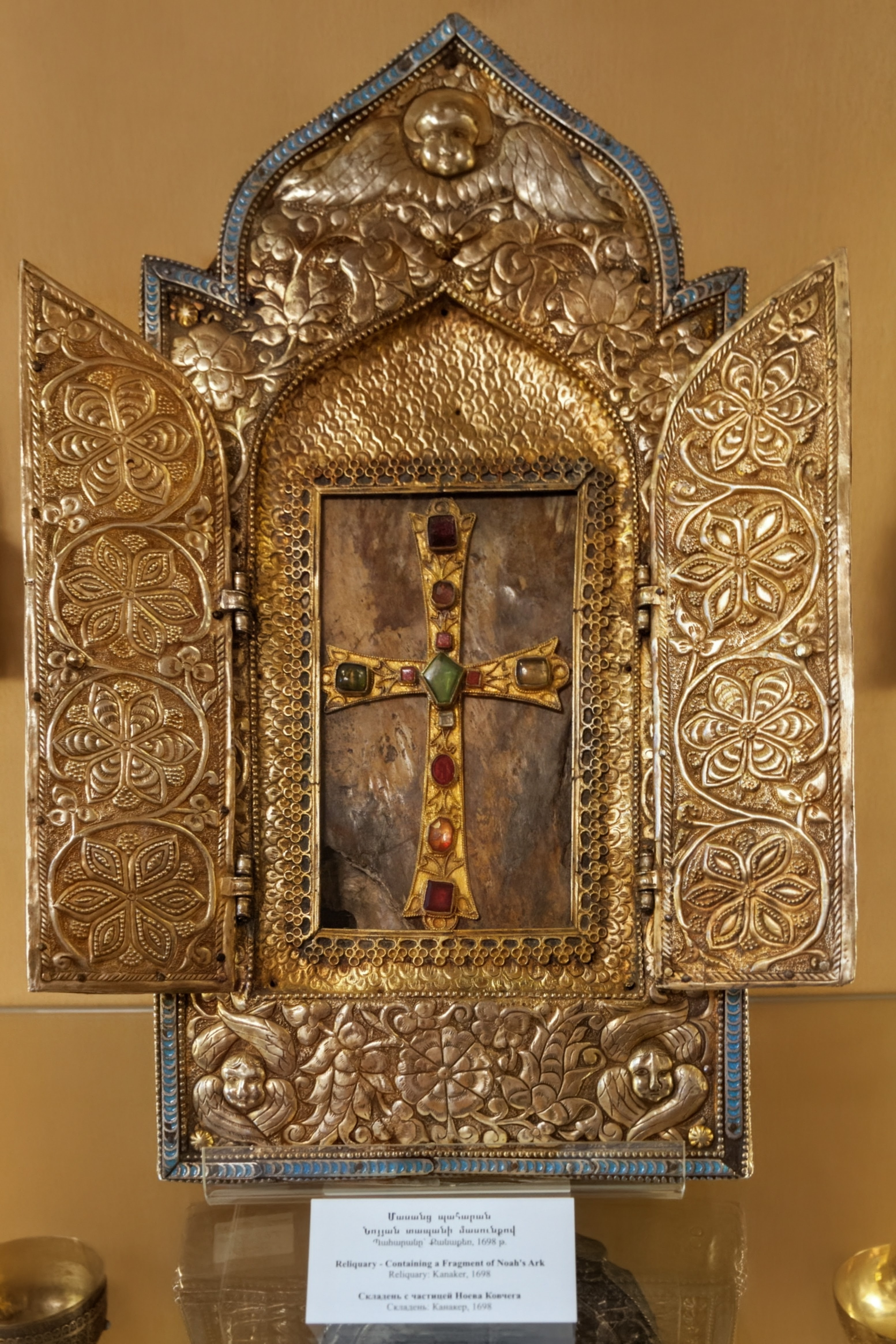
The cross under which is a fragment of Noah's Ark

The museum of the cathedral has numerous items on display, including manuscripts and religious objects. Among its notable exhibits are the Holy Lance (Spear), relics belonging to Apostles of Jesus and John the Baptist, and a fragment of Noah's Ark. Its reliquary also originally held items belonging to Athenogenes of Pedachtoë, though it is unclear if these are still within the church.

== Significance ==
The locus of Echmiatsin is "a sanctified soil" similar to Temple Mount and the Golden Temple, for Jews and Sikhs, respectively. In his first encyclical (1893) as Catholicos, Mkrtich Khrimian called the cathedral the "Zion of Ararat." In 1991 Catholicos Vazgen I described the cathedral as "our Solomon's Temple." The cathedral complex has been called "Armenian Vatican" as it is a major pilgrimage site for Armenians worldwide. Since the cathedral has been so important to the development of Armenians' sense of identity, a pilgrimage to Echmiatsin is "as much as ethnic as a religious experience." Theodore Edward Dowling wrote in 1910 that Echmiatsin and Mount Ararat are the "two great objects of Armenian veneration."

For many centuries, Echmiatsin as the national and political center of the stateless Armenian people, with one journalist describing it as "the focal point of Armenians everywhere." Before the foundation of the First Republic of Armenia and the official designation of Yerevan as its capital in 1918, Western sources emphasized Echmiatsin's political significance. A 1920 book prepared by the Historical Section of the British Foreign Office acknowledged that Echmiatsin "was regarded as the national capital of the Armenians."

== Oldest cathedral ==
Echmiatsin is usually considered Armenia's first cathedral. A number of sources also hold that Echmiatsin is the oldest cathedral in the Christendom. (Note: According to Encyclopedia of the Peoples of Africa and the Middle East, it is "generally regarded" as the oldest cathedral in the world, while historian Steven Gertz wrote in Christianity Today that Etchmiadzin is regarded as such "according to some scholars.")

It has sometimes been described as Armenia's first church building, but this claim has found little support among scholars, who usually posit that the country's first church was in Ashtishat, in the Taron region. (Note: Robert W. Thomson, Stepan Mnatsakanian, Vrej Nersessian, and Grigoryan) A 2020 book on the cathedral, authorized by the Armenian Church, insisted that Echmiatsin is the first church of Christian Armenia, although earlier Christian places of worship such as chapels or shrines existed prior. Robert W. Thomson argues that although Echmiatsin was not the original center of the Armenian Church (which was and remained in Ashtishat until after the division of the country in 387), it had "clearly been a holy shrine" from the "earliest Christian time in Armenia." Aram Ter-Ghevondyan countered that it was the original fourth century seat of the Armenian Catholicos, arguing that it is politically and logically more coherent for the head of the church to reside in the capital, rather than a remote location like Ashtishat.

Despite official state atheism, the Soviets often promoted the cathedral's antiquity. A 1982 Soviet guidebook called it the "first Christian church to be built on the territory of the Soviet Union", while travel writer Georgi Kublitsky wrote in 1984 that the cathedral is "believed by some to be the oldest extant building on Soviet territory."

== Cultural depictions ==
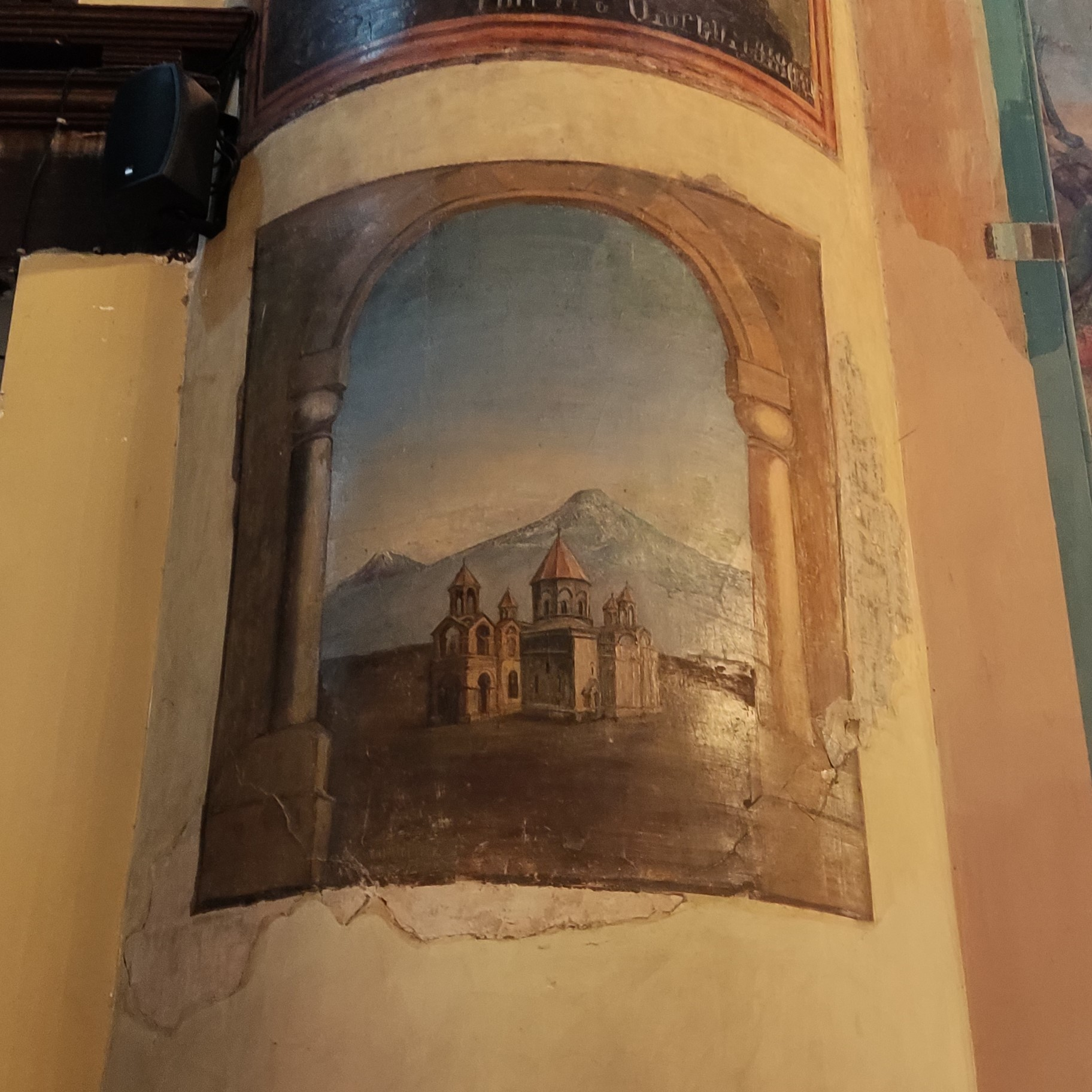
A fresco inside St. George's Church, Tbilisi, Georgia

The coat of arms of Russian-administered Erivan (Yerevan), approved in 1843, featured the cathedral. The Etchmiadzin monthly, the official periodical of the Mother See of Holy Echmiatsin founded in 1944, features the cathedral on its cover page as the logo. The Soviet Union and Armenia issued postage stamps depicting the cathedral in 1978 and 2009, respectively. The cathedral is depicted on the obverse side of the 50,000 dram banknote (2001) of Armenia.

The cathedral has been depicted in painting by Grigory Gagarin (1847), Panos Terlemezian (1903), and in books by John Mason Neale (1850), August von Haxthausen (1854), John Ussher (1865), and others. The floor mosaic, created by the 20th-century Israeli artist Hava Yofe, inside the Chapel of Saint Helena at Jerusalem's Church of the Holy Sepulchre depicts the cathedral along with other major Armenian sites. A relief of the cathedral was erected on the headquarters of the Eastern Diocese of the Armenian Church of America next to the St. Vartan Cathedral in New York and silver plate depicting the cathedral is displayed at the American Museum of Natural History in New York.

== Bibliography ==
=== Academic articles ===
- Corley, Felix (1996). "The Armenian Church Under the Soviet Regime" (PDF). Religion, State & Society. 24 (1). Keston Institute: 9–53. doi:10.1080/09637499608431724. ISSN 0963-7494. Archived (PDF) from the original on 23 September 2015.
- Grigoryan, Vahagn (2012a). "Ագաթանգեղոսի "Հայոց պատմությունը" և Հայաստանի վաղ միջնադարի ճարտարապետության ուսումնասիրության խնդիրները [Agathangeghos's "History of Armenia" and Problems in the Study of the Early Medieval Armenian Architecture]". Patma-Banasirakan Handes (in Armenian) (1). Yerevan: Armenian Academy of Sciences: 14–37. ISSN 0135-0536. Archived from the original on 14 July 2014.
- Grigoryan, Vahagn (2012b). "Մայր տաճարի հնագույն երեք քանդակների թվագրման խնդիրը [The Problem of Dating the Three Earliest Reliefs of the Echmiadzin Cathedral]". Patma-Banasirakan Handes (in Armenian) (3). Yerevan: Armenian Academy of Sciences: 3–20. ISSN 0135-0536. Archived from the original on 14 July 2014.
- Grigoryan, Vahagn (1986). "Էջմիածնի մայր տաճարը [Cathedral of Etchmiadzin]". Lraber Hasarakakan Gitutyunneri (in Armenian) (7). Yerevan: Armenian Academy of Sciences: 77–85. ISSN 0320-8117. Archived from the original on 19 August 2014.
- Harutyunyan, Varazdat (1984). "Էջմիածնի Մայր տաճարի հիմնական վերանորոգումը (1954–1955) [Fundamental restoration of Echmiadzin Cathedral temple (1954–1955)]". Lraber Hasarakakan Gitutyunneri (in Armenian) (10). Yerevan: Armenian Academy of Sciences: 56–67. ISSN 0320-8117. Archived from the original on 19 August 2014.
- Harutiunian, Z. (1978). "Էջմիածին. Պատմական ակնարկ (Etchmiadzin: Historical Overview)". Soviet Armenian Encyclopedia Volume 4 (in Armenian). Yerevan. pp. 654–68.
- Hasratyan, Murad (2003). "Էջմիածնի Մայր տաճարի ճարտարապետությունը Ղազար Փարպեցու օրոք [The Architecture of the Echmiadzin Cathedral in the Time of Lazarus Parpetsi]". Patma-Banasirakan Handes (in Armenian) (2). Yerevan: Armenian Academy of Sciences: 266–271. ISSN 0135-0536. Archived from the original on 14 July 2014.
- Khatchatrian, Armen (1962). "Données historiques sur la fondation d'Edjmiatsin à la lumière des fouilles récentes [Historical data on the foundation of Edjmiatsin in the light of recent excavations]". Handes Amsorya (in French) (1–2). Vienna: Mechitharisten-Congregation. ISSN 0017-7377. OCLC 26019166.
- Mnatsakanian, Stepan (1987). "Вопросы формирования Эчмиадзинского кафедрала в контексте эволюции крестовокупольных систем [Structural Principles of the Cathedral of Echmiadzin within the Context of Developing Systems of Cross-Shaped Cupolas]". Patma-Banasirakan Handes (in Armenian) (1). Yerevan: Armenian Academy of Sciences: 147–158. ISSN 0135-0536. Archived from the original on 14 July 2014.
- Sahinian, Alexander (1966). "Էջմիածնի Մայր տաճարի սկզբնական տեսքը [The Original Shape of the Cathedral of Echmiatsin]". Patma-Banasirakan Handes (in Armenian) (3). Yerevan: Armenian Academy of Sciences: 71–94. Archived from the original on 22 February 2014.
- Sahinian, Alexander (1978). "Մոդուլային համակարգը Էջմիածնի Մայր տաճարի V դարի գմբեթակիր կառուցվածքում [The Module System in the 5th Century Cupola Structures of the Cathedral of Echmiadzin]". Patma-Banasirakan Handes (in Armenian) (2). Yerevan: Armenian Academy of Sciences: 140–158. Archived from the original on 22 February 2014.
- Sahinian, Alexander; Zarian, A.; Ghazarian, M. (1978). "Էջմիածնի Մայր Տաճար [Etchmiadzin Cathedral]". Soviet Armenian Encyclopedia Volume 4 (in Armenian). Yerevan. pp. 71–73.
- Ter-Movsisian, Mesrovb (1907). "Էջմիածին եւ հայոց հնագոյն եկեղեցիներ [Etchmiadzin and ancient Armenian churches]". Azgagrakan Handes (in Armenian). 16. Tiflis: Yervand Lalayan: 130–204. Archived from the original on 19 August 2014.
- Hovsepian, Shahen (2021). "Շահ Աբաս Ա-ի հակաօսմանեան քաղաքականութիւնը եւ Նոր Ջուղայի մայր տաճարի կառուցումը The anti-Ottoman policy of Shah Abbas I and the construction of the Cathedral of New Julfa]" (PDF). Vardzk (in Armenian). 15. Research on Armenian Architecture: 48–52. ISSN 1829-2003. Archived from the original (PDF) on 27 December 2021.

=== Published books ===
Specific

- Ashjian, Mesrob, ed. (2003). The Etchmiadzin chronicles (in English, Italian, Russian, German, French, and Armenian). Yerevan: Moughni Publishers. ISBN 99941-33-04-7.
- Balakian, Grigoris (1911). Ս. Էջմիածնի բարեկարգութեան պէտքը [Holy Ejmiatsin in Need of Renovation] (in Armenian). Constantinople: Shant.
- Bastamiants, Vahan (1877). Նկարագրութիւն Մայր եկեղեցիոյն հայոց Ս. Էջմիածնի [Description of Mother Church of Holy Ejmiatsin] (in Armenian and Russian). Vagharshapat.
- Harutyunyan, Varazdat (1978). Էջմիածին [Ējmiatsin] (in Armenian). Yerevan: Sovetakan Grogh. OCLC 19983186.
- Harutyunyan, Varazdat; Société pour la protection des monuments historiques et culturels de la RSS d'Arménie (1985). Etchmiadsin (in French). Yerevan: Hayastan. OCLC 78980119.
- Harutyunyan, Varazdat (1988). Եկայք շինեսցուք: Պատմութիւն Ս. Էջմիածնի Մայր Աթոռի շինարարական գործունէութեան Ամենայն Հայոց Կաթողիկոս Վազգէն Առաջինի գահակալութեան շրջանում (1955–1988) [History of construction activities at the Mother See of Holy Etchmiadzin during the reign of Vazgen I (1955–1988)] (in Armenian). Los Angeles: Erebuni.
- Kazarian, Armen (2007). Кафедральный собор Сурб Эчмиадзин и восточнохристианское зодчество IV-VII веков [Cathedral of Holy Ejmiacin and the Eastern Christian architecture of the 4th-7th centuries] (in Russian). Moscow: Locus Standi. ISBN 978-5-94428-041-1.
- Miller, Julie A. (1996). "Echmiadzin (Armenia)". In Ring, Trudy; Salkin, Robert M.; La Boda, Sharon (eds.). International Dictionary of Historic Places: Middle East and Africa. Vol. 4. Chicago: Fitzroy Dearborn Publishers. pp. 250–253. ISBN 978-1-884964-03-9. Archived from the original on 22 March 2021.
- Parsamian, Vardan (1931). Էջմիածինն անցյալում: Պատմական ուսումնասիրության փորձ [Etchmiadzin in the past: An attempt of historical research] (in Armenian). Pethrat: Yerevan.
- Sahinian, Alexander (1978). Ս. Էջմիածին / Св. Эчмиадзин / St. Etchmiadzine (in Armenian, Russian, and French). Mother See of Holy Etchmiadzin. OCLC 47168540.
- Shahkhatunian, Hovhannes [in Armenian] (1842). Ստորագրութիւն Կաթուղիկէ Էջմիածնի եւ հինգ գաւառացն Արարատայ [Description of the Cathedral of Ejmiacin and of the Five Districts of Ararat], 2 vols (in Armenian). Holy Ejmiacin.
- Toramanian, Toros (1910). Էջմիածնի տաճարը: Ճարտարապետական եւ հնագիտական հետազօտութիւններ [Etchmiadzin Cathedral: Architectural and Archaeological Studies] (in Armenian). Tiflis: Aganiants Publishing.
- Նկարագրութիւն Սուրբ Էջմիածնի Մայր տաճարի [Description of the Holy Etchmiadzin Cathedral] (in Armenian). Vagharshapat: Holy Etchmiadzin Cathedral Publishing. 1890. OCLC 861620582.
- Ս. Էջմիածին 303–1903: Պատկերազարդ նկարագրութիւն [Holy Etchmiadzin 303–1903: Illustrated description] (in Armenian). San Lazzaro degli Armeni, Venice: Mechitarist Order. 1903. OCLC 35048877.
- Սուրբ Էջմիածին: 1600-րդ տարեդարձ (303–1903) [Holy Etchmiadzin: 1600th anniversary (303–1903)] (in Armenian). Saint Petersburg: Pushkinean Aragatip. 1903. OCLC 46338801.
- Khachatryan, Tovma (2020). Սուրբ Էջմիածին. քրիստոնեական առաջին գմբեթավոր տաճարը [Holy Etchmiadzin: The First Christian Domed Church] (in Armenian). Ejmiatsin: Mother See of Holy Etchmiadzin Press. ISBN 9789939592497.

General

- Adalian, Rouben Paul (2010). Historical Dictionary of Armenia. Lanham, Maryland: Scarecrow Press. ISBN 978-0-8108-7450-3.
- Arakelian, Babken N.; Yeremian, Suren T.; Arevshatian, Sen S.; Bartikian, Hrach M.; Danielian, Eduard L.; Ter-Ghevondian, Aram N., eds. (1984). Հայ ժողովրդի պատմություն հատոր II. Հայաստանը վաղ ֆեոդալիզմի ժամանակաշրջանում [History of the Armenian People Volume II: Armenia in the Early Age of Feudalism] (PDF) (in Armenian). Yerevan: Armenian SSR Academy of Sciences Publishing. Archived (PDF) from the original on 14 July 2014.
- Atkin, Muriel (1980). Russia and Iran, 1780–1828. University of Minnesota Press. ISBN 978-0-8166-0924-6.
- Behrooz, Maziar (2013). "From confidence to apprehension: early Iranian interaction with Russia". In Cronin, Stephanie (ed.). Iranian-Russian Encounters: Empires and Revolutions Since 1800. Routledge. ISBN 978-0-415-62433-6.
- Bournoutian, George A. (1992). The Khanate of Erevan Under Qajar Rule: 1795–1828. Mazda Publishers. ISBN 978-0-939214-18-1.
- Bryce, James (1878). Transcaucasia and Ararat: Being Notes of a Vacation Tour in Autumn of 1876 (3rd ed.). London: Macmillan and Co.
- Buxton, David Roden (1975). Russian Mediaeval Architecture with an Account of the Transcaucasian Styles and Their Influence in the West. New York: Hacker Art Books. ISBN 978-0-87817-005-0. Reprint of the 1934 ed. published by the Cambridge University Press
- Buxton, Noel; Buxton, Harold (1914). Travel and Politics in Armenia. London: Macmillan.
- Der Nersessian, Sirarpie (1945). Armenia and the Byzantine Empire. Cambridge, Massachusetts: Harvard University Press.
- Hacikyan, Agop Jack; Basmajian, Gabriel; Franchuk, Edward S.; Ouzounian, Nourhan (2005). The Heritage of Armenian Literature: From the eighteenth century to modern times. Vol. 3. Detroit: Wayne State University Press. ISBN 978-0-8143-3221-4.
- Payaslian, Simon (2007). The History of Armenia. New York: Palgrave Macmillan. ISBN 978-1-4039-7467-9.
- Panossian, Razmik (2006). The Armenians: From Kings and Priests to Merchants and Commissars. New York: Columbia University Press. ISBN 978-0-231-51133-9.
- Thierry, Jean-Michel; Donabédian, Patrick (1989) [1987]. Armenian Art. Translated by Celestine Dars. New York: Harry N. Abrams. ISBN 0-8109-0625-2.
- Dowling, Theodore Edward (1910). The Armenian Church. London: Society for Promoting Christian Knowledge.
- Telfer, J. Buchan (1876). The Crimea and Transcaucasia, being the narrative of a journey in the Kouban, in Gouria, Georgia, Armenia, Ossety, Imeritia, Swannety, and Mingrelia, and in the Tauric Range. Volume I. London: Henry S. King & Co.
- Thomson, Robert W. (1994). "Agathangelos". In Greppin, John A. C. (ed.). Studies in Classical Armenian Literature. Delmar, New York: Caravan Books. pp. 15–26.
- Lynch, H. F. B. (1901). Armenia: Travels and Studies. Volume I: The Russian Provinces. London: Longmans, Green, and Co.
- Harutyunyan, Varazdat (1992). Հայկական ճարտարապետության պատմություն [History of Armenian Architecture] (PDF) (in Armenian). Yerevan: Luys. ISBN 5-545-00215-4. Archived from the original on 7 January 2023.
- von Haxthausen, August (1854). Transcaucasia: Sketches of the Nations and Races Between the Black Sea and the Caspian. London: Chapman and Hall.
- Villari, Luigi (1906). Fire and Sword in the Caucasus. London: T. F. Unwin.
- Maranci, Christina (1998). Medieval Armenian Architecture in historiography: Josef Strygowski and His Legacy (PhD thesis). Princeton University. OCLC 40827094.
