= Abrahami =

Abrahami is a surname or a patronymic derived from the given name Abraham. Notable people with this surname or patronymic include:

- Natalie Abrahami, British theatre, film and opera director
- Avishai Abrahami, Nadav Abrahami, founders of Wix.com, Israeli software company, providing cloud-based web development services
- Arshak Abrahami Fetvadjian or Arshak Fetvadjian, Armenian artist, painter and designer
