= Pharaon (name) =

Pharaon (and its variant Pharaoun) is a surname and a masculine given name. Notable people with the name are as follows:

== Surname ==
- Ghaith Pharaon (1940–2017), Saudi Arabian businessman
- Laith Pharaon (born 1968), British businessman
- Michel Pharaon (born 1959), Lebanese politician
- Henri Philippe Pharaoun (1901–1993), Lebanese politician, and businessman
- Rashad Pharaon (1912–1990), Syrian-born Saudi Arabian statesman and physician

== Given name ==
- Pharaon Mirzoyan (born 1949), Armenian painter
- Pharaon de Winter (1849–1924), French painter
