= National Gallery of Armenia =

Art gallery in Yerevan, Armenia

Coordinates: 40°10′43.5″N 44°30′51″E

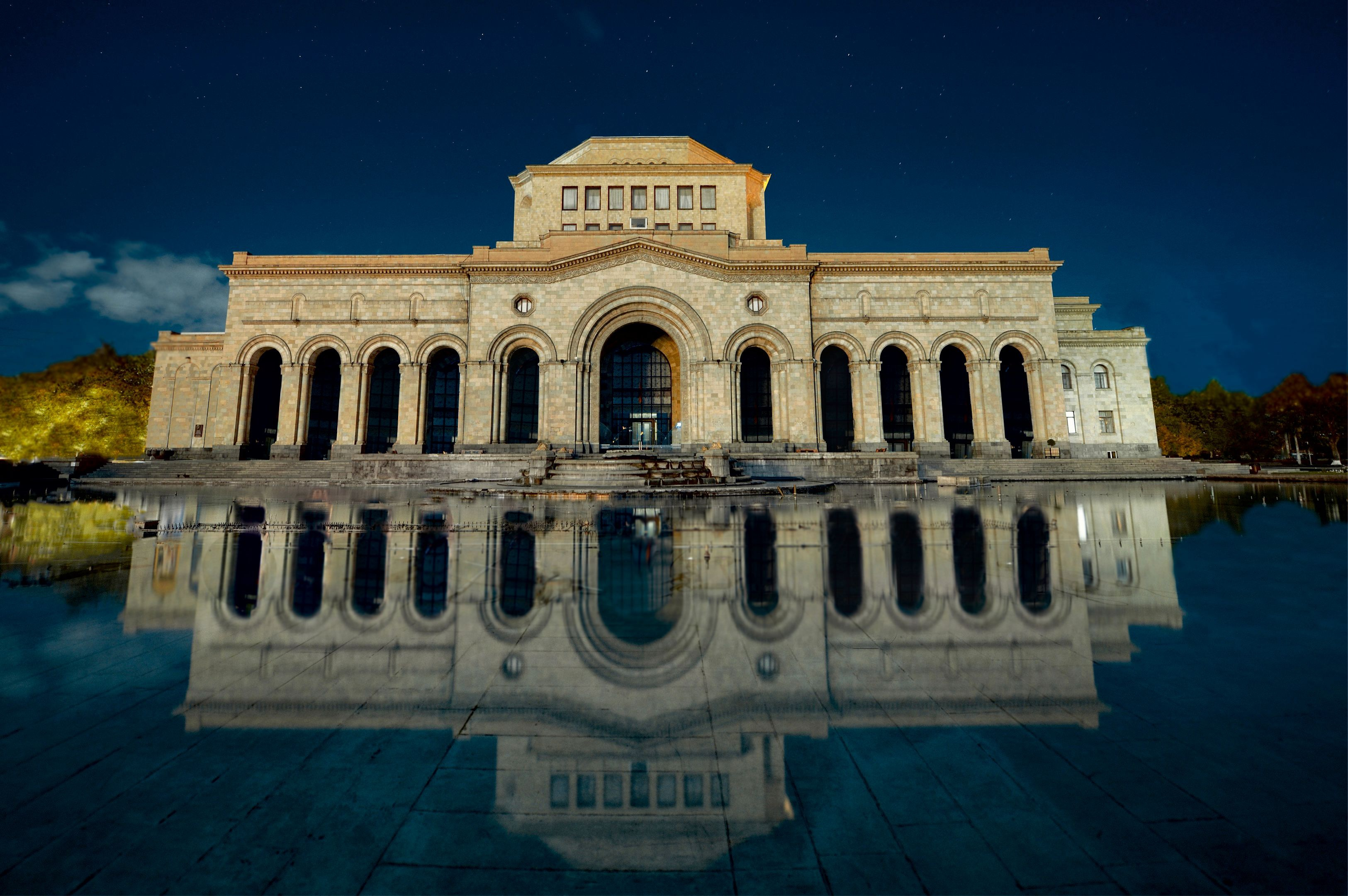
- Established: 1921
- Location: Yerevan, Armenia
- Type: Art gallery
- Visitors: 105,000 (2026)
- Director: Marina Hakobyan
- Website: gallery.am

The National Gallery of Armenia (Armenian: Հայաստանի ազգային պատկերասրահ, Hayastani azgayin patkerasrah) is the largest fine arts museum in Armenia. Located on Yerevan's Republic Square, the museum has one of the most prominent locations in the Armenian capital. The National Gallery of Armenia is the only museum in the region distinguished by the breadth and scale of its collection of world fine art. Its collections include masterpieces by world-renowned artists such as Hovhannes Aivazovsky, Vardges Sureniants, Arshile Gorky, Marc Chagall, Wassily Kandinsky, Donatello, Tintoretto, and many others. The Gallery also preservs unique fragments of medieval Armenian church frescoes from Armenia and Armenian cultural centers abroad, including Aruch, Lmbatavank, Tatev, Haghpat, Ani, Talin, Akhtala, Kobayr, Meghri, and Crimea. In addition, it houses an exceptional archive of approximately 200,000 items, including photographs, notebooks, letters, articles, personal belongings, and documentary materials related to prominent Armenian and international artists and significant cultural events. The museum had 105,000 visitors in 2026.

== History ==
The National Gallery of Armenia (NGA) was founded in 1921 under the decree of the Armenian Soviet Socialist Republic (Armenian SSR) and represents the artistic section of the State museum. Upon its establishment the NGA's art section encountered difficulties, largely because Yerevan lacked state owned and private art collections to form the core of the collection. The first works to enter the collection where the dozens of works purchased from an Armenian painters' exhibition in August 1921.

A decisive factor in the founding of the NGA's art collection was the transfer of the renowned collection of the Armenian Cultural Center (the former Lazarian Seminary, Moscow) and also the donations made by Armenian artists to the NGA. By 1925, 400 pieces by Armenian, Russian and European artists were on display throughout the six halls which compose the museum's art section.

By 1935, the state art section, which had undergone many refurbishments, became a separate Art Museum. In 1947 the gallery was re-dubbed the State Picture Gallery of Armenia and subsequently renamed the National Gallery of Armenia in 1991. The art gallery's large collection of works are on display thanks to the efforts of many dedicated compatriots and friendly donations from foreign associates.

The NGA currently houses around 42,000 works of art, many of which are permanently displayed in the museum's 56 halls.

== Description ==
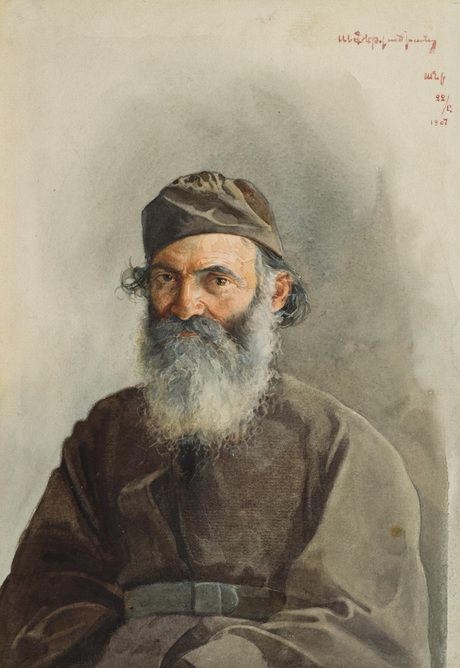
Mikayel vardapet by Arshak Fetvadjian (1907)

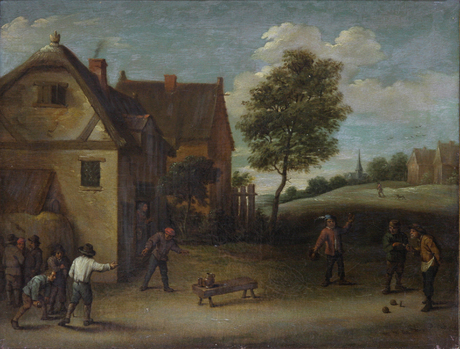
Playing Skittles, by David Teniers the Younger

NGA has also incorporated many examples of "foreign art" (predominantly Western) into their collection, many of which were originally part of the 'Armenian Cultural Center' (the former Lazarian Seminary, Moscow), which was nationalized during the Soviet period and moved to Yerevan.

The ancient collections include examples of ancient art from Egypt (New Kingdom, Greco-Roman, Coptic), Greece (Corinth, Attica), Rome, and Iran. The Decorative Arts department has ceramic and porcelain collections of Chinese, Iranian, Italian, Japan, German, Austrian, Danish, and an extensive collection from the 18th–19th-century Tsarist Imperial Porcelain Factory in Russia. There are also a small collection of bronze items from 18th-century China (Qing dynasty) and 16th–17th-century Western European wooden furniture.

The NGA building also houses the restoration and conservation studios affiliated with the museum. The complex also has a moderately sized library and archive, a small cafeteria, a souvenir and book store, and a hall used for film screenings and lectures.

The NGA also lends to international exhibitions with works from her collection, helping to organizize exhibitions of Armenian art in different countries to see that Armenia's works are appreciated by citizens around the world.

== Armenian art ==
Armenian art makes up a large part of the collection – around 700 pieces. Exposition of classic Armenian art begins with ancient and Medieval art: Urartu frescoes and copies of Garni Temple's mosaics and Medieval wall-paintings and miniatures, including a 7th-century fresco of "Christ Enthroned" from St. Stephanos Church (Lmbatavank), a 10th-century fresco fragment of "The Last Judgment" from St. Poghos-Petros (Tatev), and a 13th-century fresco depicting the Nativity from St. Astvatsatskin (Akhtala).

The museum has an extensive collection of Armenian Apostolic Church-related paintings ranging from the 17th-19th centuries, as well as, silver book-covers of manuscripts, crosses, and 18th-century altar curtains from across Asia.

Collection of Armenian paintings of the 17th century consists mostly of the artistic heritage of the Hovnatanian's dynasty. Beside works of Hovnatan Hovnatanian, strong collection of pieces by Hakob Hovnatanyan, founder of portrait genre in Armenian painting, is displayed in the Gallery.

The Gallery stores more than 62 canvases of Ivan Aivazovsky, Russian painter of Armenian background, who wrote a lot of paintings on Armenian motifs.

The largest part of the Armenian collection is dedicated to the work of classical Armenian painters of the 19th and 20th century – Vardges Sureniants, Stepan Aghajanian, Yeghishe Tadevosyan, Panos Terlemezian, Gevorg Bashinjaghian, Martiros Saryan, Hakob Kojoyan, Arshak Fetvadjian and others.

There is a particular strength in the field of art by diasporan Armenians, and it includes works by Zakar Zakarian (Paris), Edgar Chahine (Paris), Hovsep Pushman (New York), Jean Carzou (Paris), Jean Jansem (Paris), Gerardo Oragyan (Rome), and Paul Guiragossian (Beirut).

In 2008, a pavilion was opened specifically for Hakob Gyurjian's works.

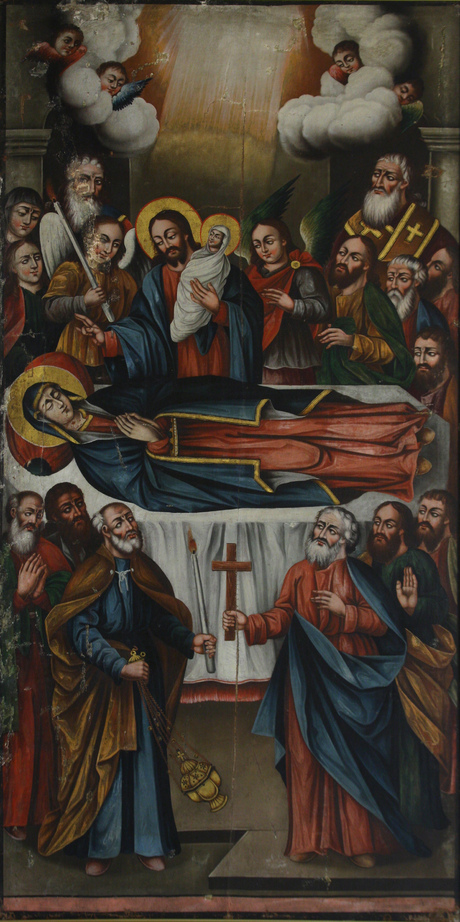
H. Hovnatanian, Assumption of the Virgin XVIII c.

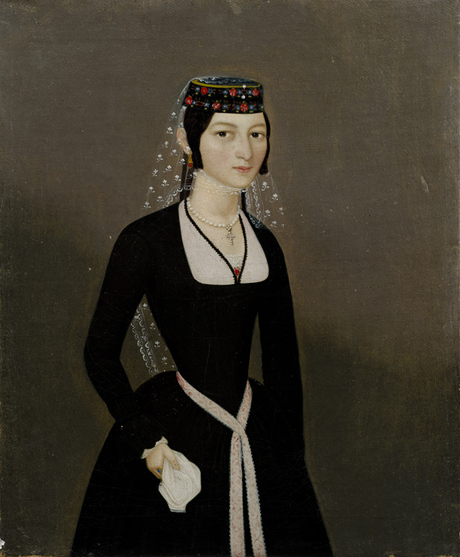
H. Hovnatanyan, Portrait of Natali Teumian, 1830-1840

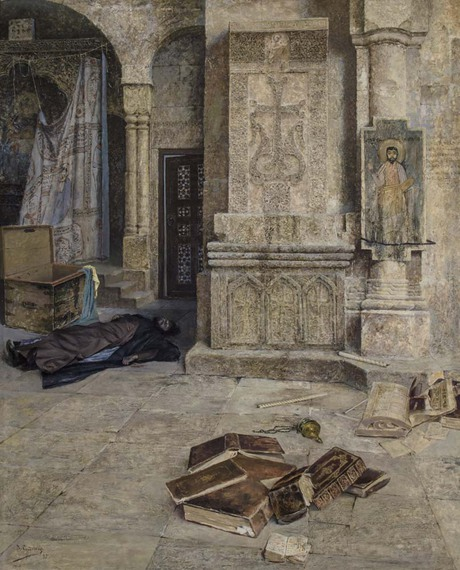
V. Sureniants, Desecrated Shrine, 1895

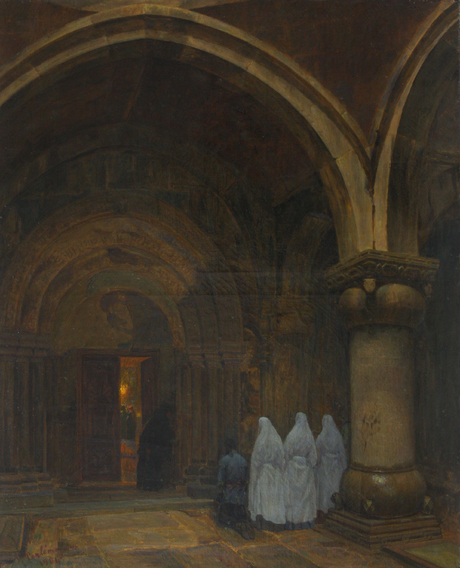
P. Terlemezian, Gavit of Sanahin Monastery, 1904

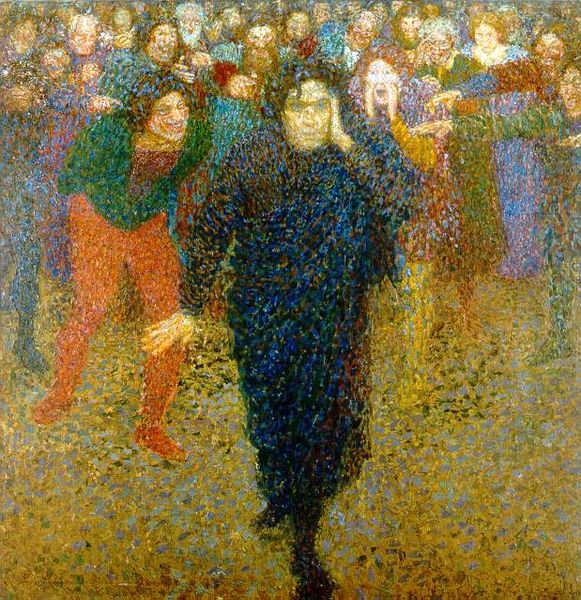
Y. Tadevosyan, The Genius and the Crowd, 1919
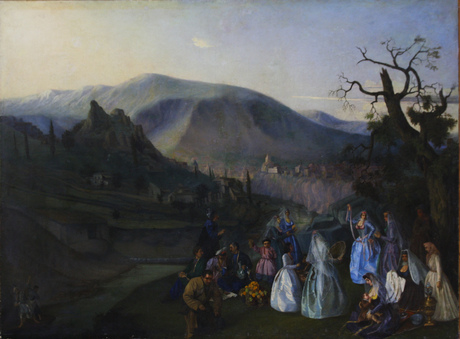
S. Nersisyan, Picnic on the bank of the Kura, 1860

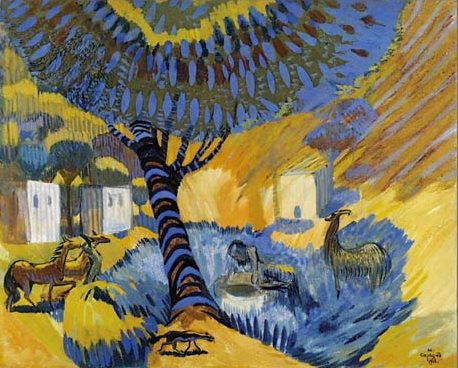
M. Saryan, By the Well. Hot Day, 1908

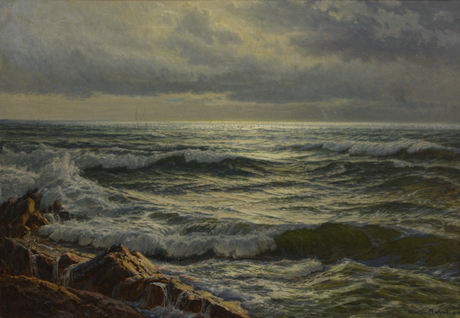
V. Makhokhyan, Ocean, 1918—1920

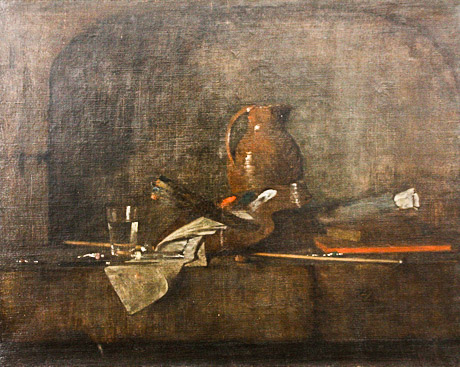
Z. Zakarian, Still life. Art items, 1900

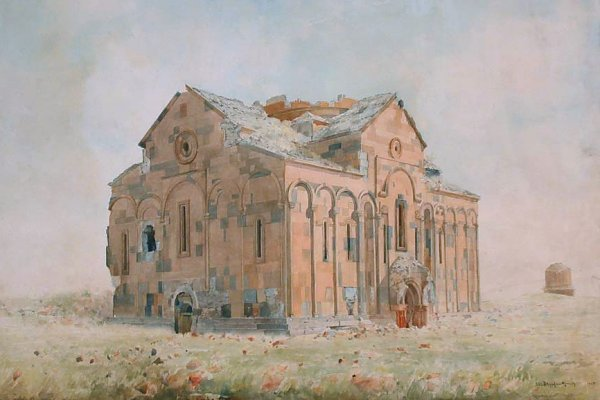
A. Fetvadjian, Ani Cathedral, 1905

== Western art ==
Western art collection totals around 170 pieces and consists of 4 major sections – Italian, Flemish, Dutch and French art, but also includes works of Spanish, German and other artists.

There are a number of European Old Master works in their holdings, including works by well-known artists from Italy, Holland, Belgium and French art movements, including significant works by Donatello, Tintoretto, Antonio Canova, Joos de Momper, Caspar Netscher, Matthias Stomer, Jan van Goyen, P. Claesz, E. M. Falconet, Carle Vanloo, J. B. Greuze, Joseph Vernet, Robert Hubert, Théodore Rousseau, Adolphe Monticelli.

There are more than 180 sheets of European graphics of the 16th and 17th century.

=== Italian art ===
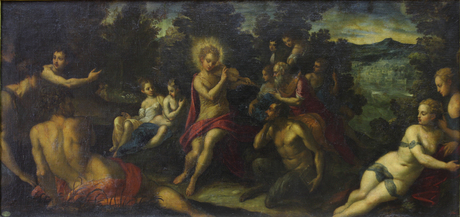
"Apollo and Pan" by Tintoretto

The Italian collection starts with the works of the 14th century. One of the most remarkable ones is "Christmas", canvas of an unknown artist of the Botticelli circle. "Apollo and Pan" by famous Tintoretto is a prominent example of High Renaissance. Portrait genre of the 17th century is represented by the work of Bernardo Strozzi "Portrait of Nikola Kuchi" and 2 portraits by Guercino, member of the Bolognese School. Pontormo's canvas illustrate earlier period of portrait genre.

The museum has an extensive collection of Biblical art – "The birth of Jesus and Adoration of the Shepherds" by Jacopo Bassano (recently the gallery received one more canvas by Bassano), "Good Samaritan" by Leandro Bassano, works of Luca Giordano, Pietro da Cortona, Sebastiano Ricci, Luca Signorelli, Pompeo Batoni, Bernardino Luini, Paolo Farinati, Giovanni Battista Salvi da Sassoferrato, Alessandro Turchi, Giacomo Cavedone. There are a number of noteworthy Theotokos portraits by Benvenuto Tisi, Sebastiano Conca, Elisabetta Sirani and others.

Landscape art of the 18th century is represented by Francesco Guardi, Francesco Zuccarelli, Gisolphi and several unknown artists.

The collection includes graphic works of Giovanni Domenico Tiepolo, Giovanni Paolo Panini, Federico Zuccari, Jacopo da Empoli, Luca Cambiasi, Stefano della Bella.

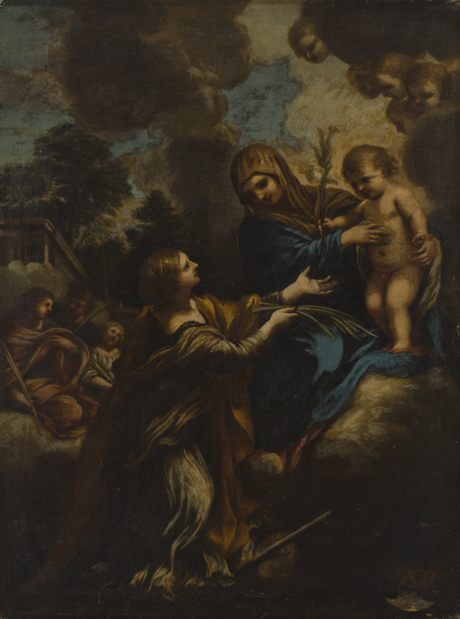
P. Cortona, St. Mary, little Jesus and st. Katharina

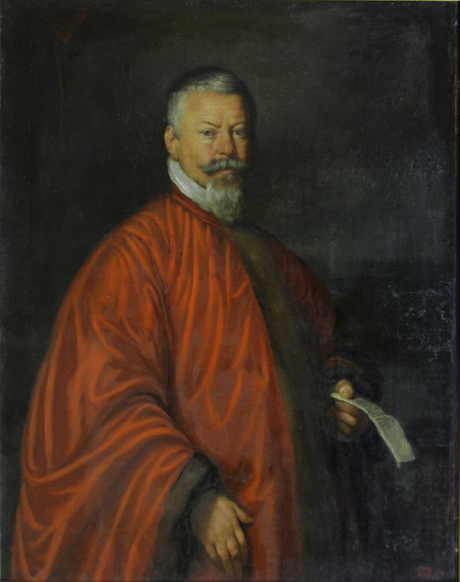
B. Strozzi, Portrait of Nikola Kuchi

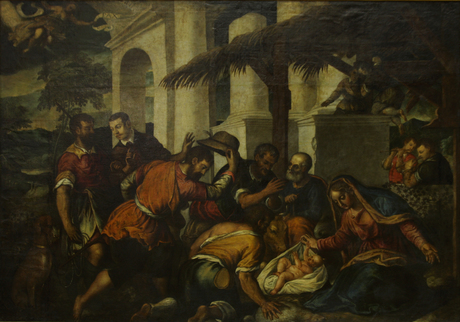
J. Bassano, The birth of Jesus and adoration of the shepherds

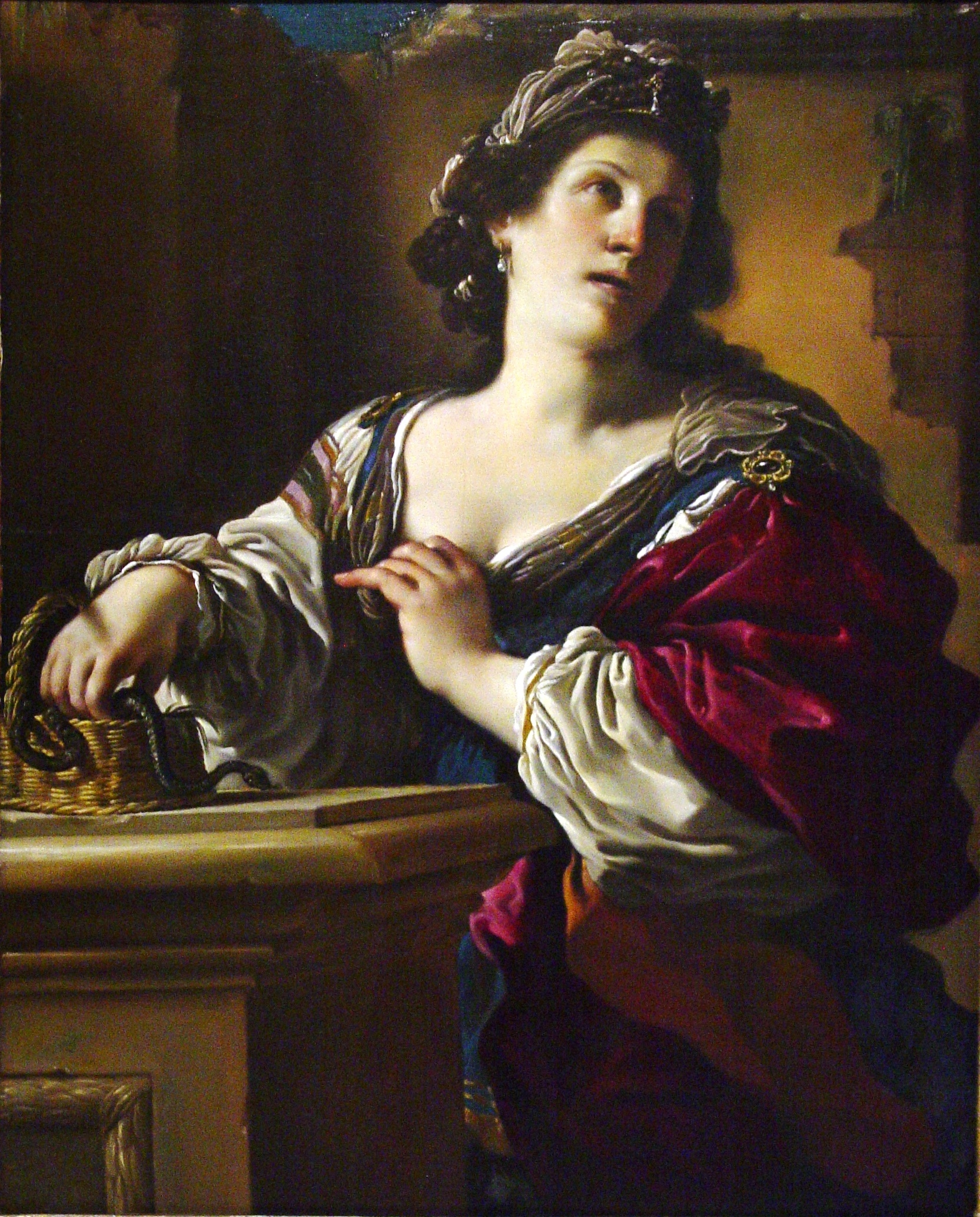
Guercino, Cleopatra

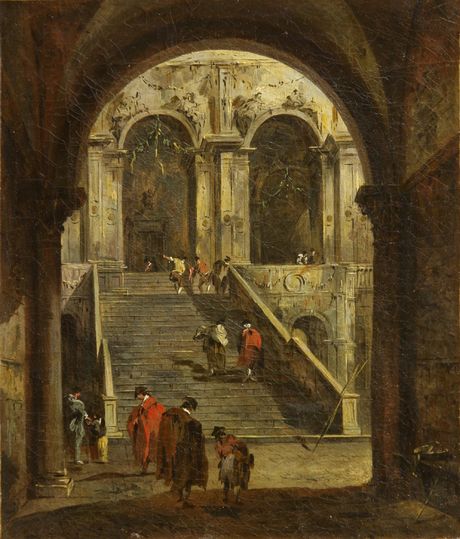
F. Guardi, Yard
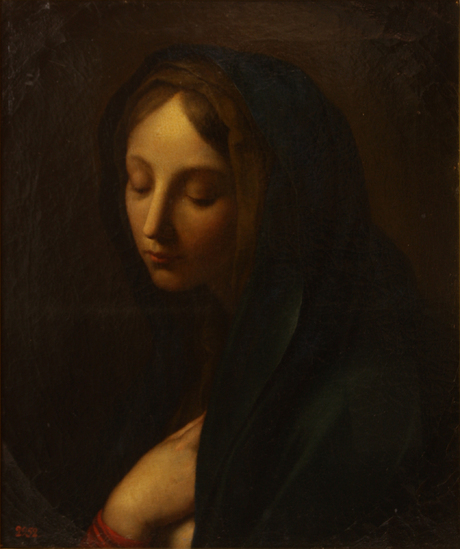
S. Conca, Godmother

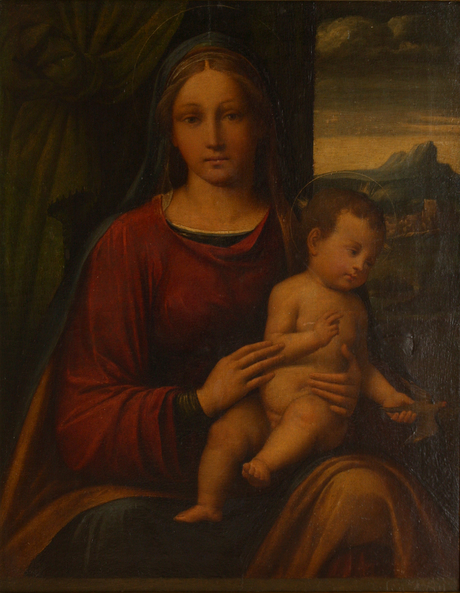
B. Tisi, Madonna and Child

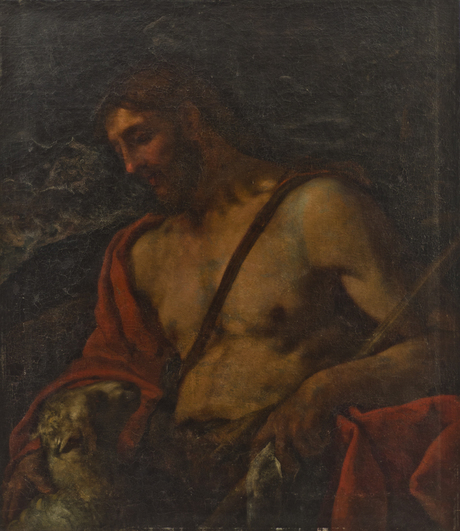
L. Giordano, The good shepherd

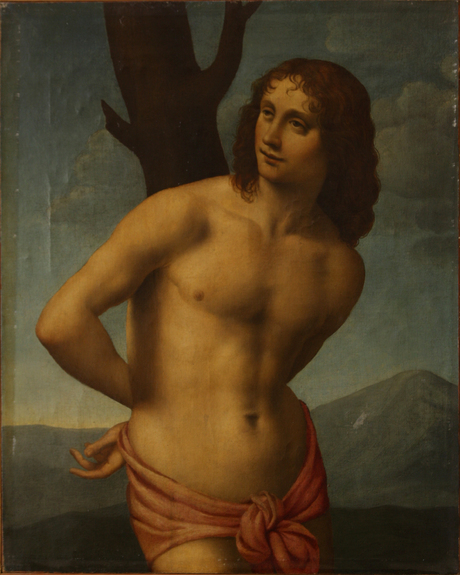
B. Luini, St. Sebastian

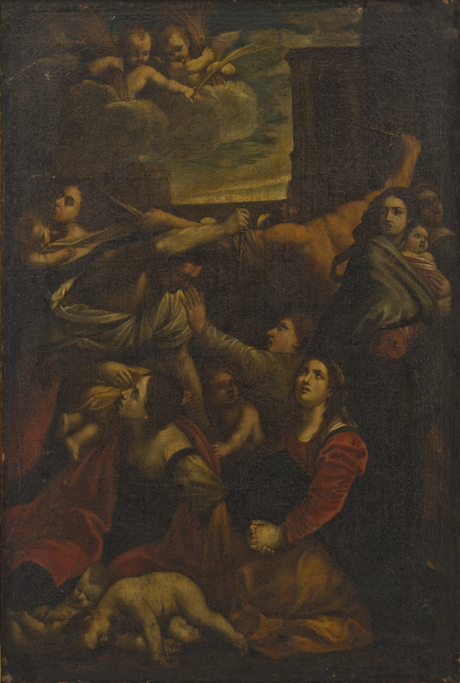
L. Signorelli, Children's massacre

=== Flemish and Dutch art ===
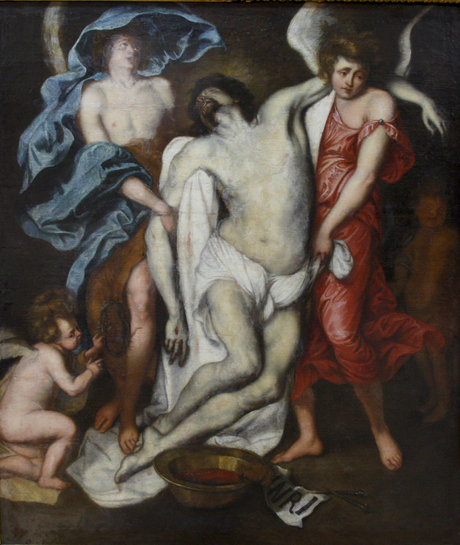
"Descent from the Cross" A. van Dyck

According to the 1982 survey, around 30 works of Flemish and 60 works of Dutch art were exhibited in the gallery. Most of them belong to the 17th century.

The Flemish art school is represented by remarkable pieces including "Procession of Silenus" by Peter Paul Rubens, "Descent from the Cross" by Anthony van Dyck, outstanding still-life paintings by Verbruggen and Jan Fyt and "Mountain landscape" by Joos de Momper. Portrait genre is represented by several canvases, most notable ones are woman portrait by Pieter Pourbus and portrait by unknown artist of the 17th century. Two works of David Teniers the Younger disclose genre painting. Work of comparatively little-known artist Jan Cossiers "Faun visiting peasants" is an example of realism art.

The Dutch collection includes works of famous artists of the Dutch Golden Age painting. The section contains "Singing lesson" by Caspar Netscher, "Company at the Table" by Pieter Codde, "Holiday" Joost Cornelisz Droochsloot, piece by Cornelis Dusart, and paintings depicting tavern motifs etc. It is worth mentioning the work "War and Peace" by Hendrick Goltzius. "Birth of Christ" by Joos van Cleve is based on the Biblical plot.

Canvases of several landscape artists are exhibited in the gallery including "View of Dordrecht" by Jan van Goyen, "Landscape with a Broken Tree" by Allaert van Everdingen and sea landscape by Ludolf Bakhuizen. At that time in Holland the so-called "Italianate landscape" became widely popular. In the gallery "Italianate landscape" is represented by the works of Nicolaes Pieterszoon Berchem, Cornelis van Poelenburgh, Karel Dujardin and Frederik de Moucheron. The gallery holds works of such Dutch still life artists as Pieter Claesz, Jan Weenix and Abraham van Beijeren. Dutch portrait genre is represented by Stom's "The Money-changer" and woman's portrait by Caspar Netscher.

The Dutch collection include works of military art, for example "Poles in the battle against the Swedes" by Philips Wouwerman and "Battle" by Esaias van de Velde.

The collection includes graphic works of Adriaen van Ostade, Jan Lievens, Jan van der Heyden, Maerten van Heemskerck, Godfried Schalcken, Abraham van Diepenbeeck, Adriaen van de Velde, Jan Dirksz Both and others.

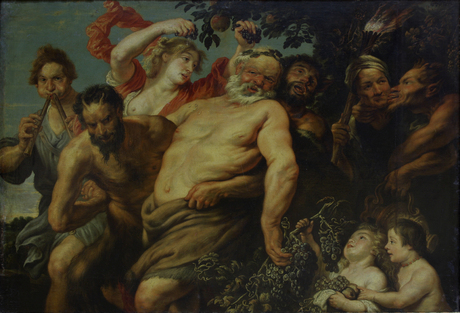
P. Rubens, Silenus march

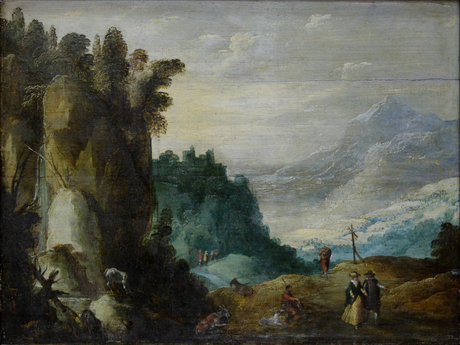
J. de Momper, Mountain landscape

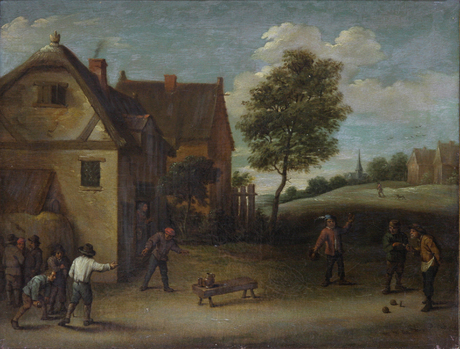
D. Teniers, Playing skittles

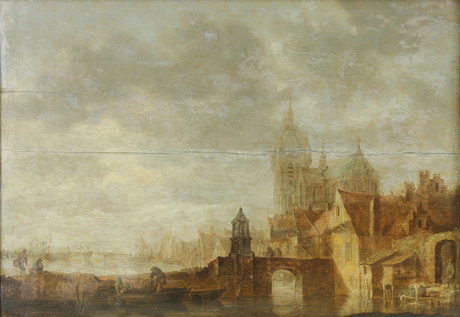
J. van Goyen, Dordrecht
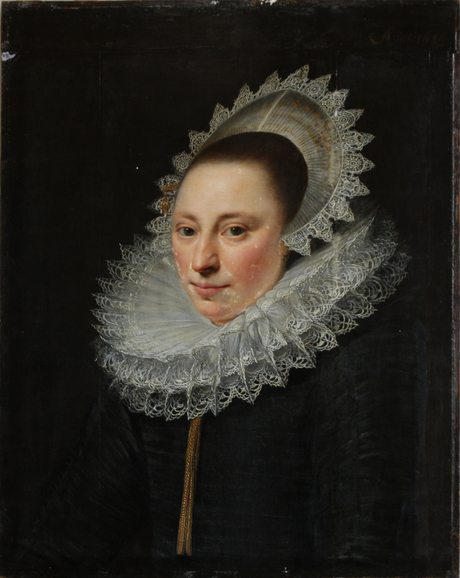
Unknown painter, Portrait of woman

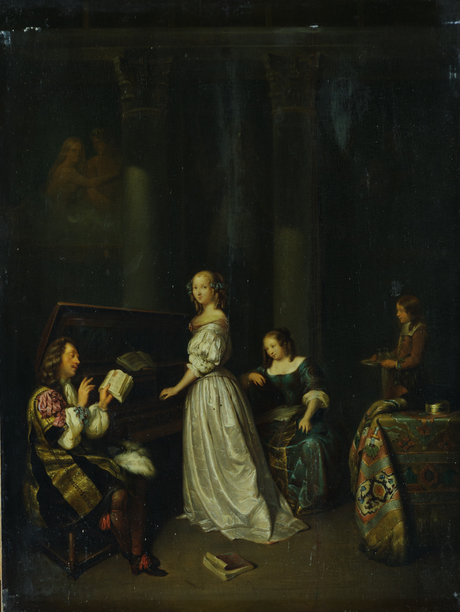
C. Netscher, Singing lesson

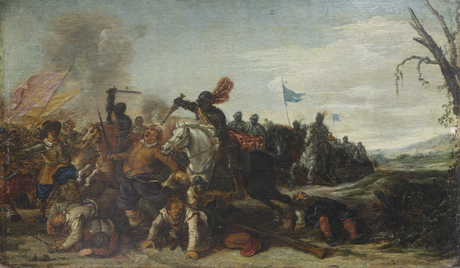
E. van de Velde, Battle

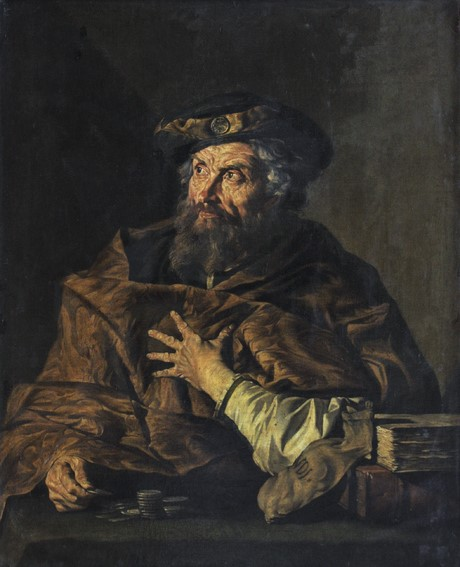
M. Stom, Exchange

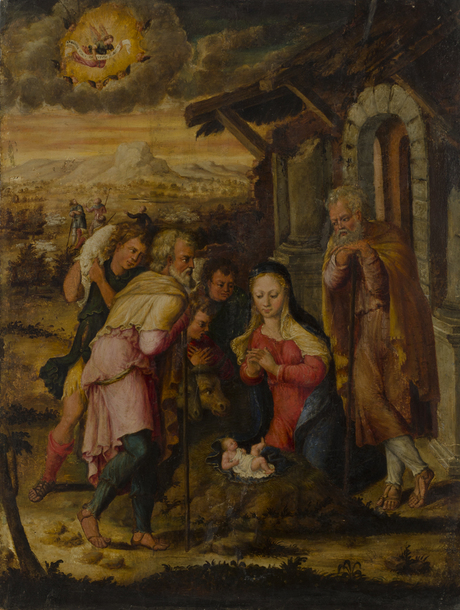
J. van Cleve, The birth of Christ

=== French art ===
The collection of French paintings is the largest in quantity among other western collections. Section starts with works of remarkable artists of the 17th century including "Rinaldo and Armida" by Jean-Honoré Fragonard, "Head of a Young Woman" by Jean-Baptiste Greuze and works of Jean-Marc Nattier, Nicolas de Largillière, François-Hubert Drouais, Charles-André van Loo, Jacques Courtois etc. Recently the gallery received a canvas "Young woman with a flower" by one of the most prominent representatives of rococo - François Boucher. There are other works within the same style – "The Italian actors" by Nicolas Lancret and "Sleeping child with angels" by François Lemoyne. Sentimentalism and classicism are represented by portraits of Élisabeth Louise Vigée Le Brun.

The development of the landscape genre in French painting can be traced back to the 17th century with the work of Gaspard Dughet. Landscape genre of the 18th century is represented by three pieces of Hubert Robert and three works of Claude-Joseph Vernet.

The gallery holds works of Barbizon school artists, which heavily influenced development of realistic traditions in the French art of the 19th century, - Théodore Rousseau "Dusk in a forest", 2 paintings of Narcisse Virgilio Díaz and seascape by Félix Ziem. The Gallery exhibits "Portrait of a girl" by the leader of the realism movement in 19th-century French painting Gustave Courbet. French collection of that period includes works of Horace Vernet, Alexandre-Gabriel Decamps, Théodore Gudin and others.

Works of Eugène Boudin, Louis Anquetin, Bernard Buffet and Adolphe Monticelli give a brief overview of the later development of the French art.

The collection includes graphic works of Jean-Antoine Watteau, Jean-Baptiste Greuze, Jacques Bellange, Jules Pascin, Auguste Rodin and others, sculptures of Antonio Canova and Étienne Maurice Falconet.

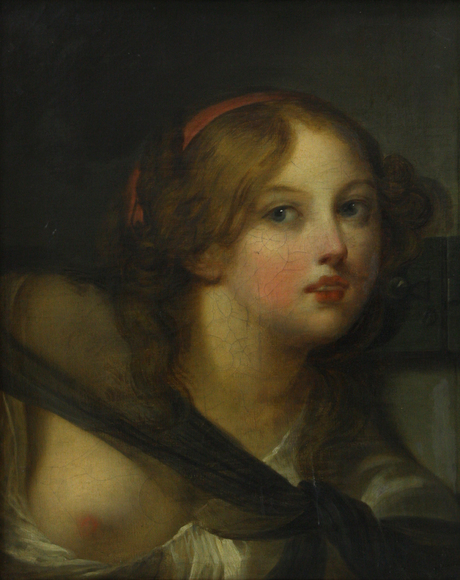
J-B. Greuze, Portrait of a girl

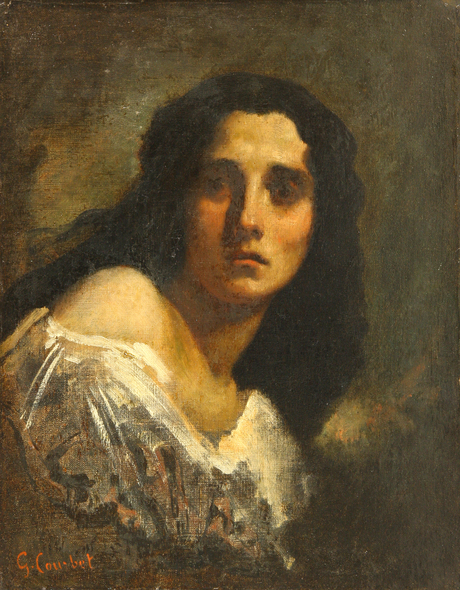
G. Courbet, Portrait of a girl

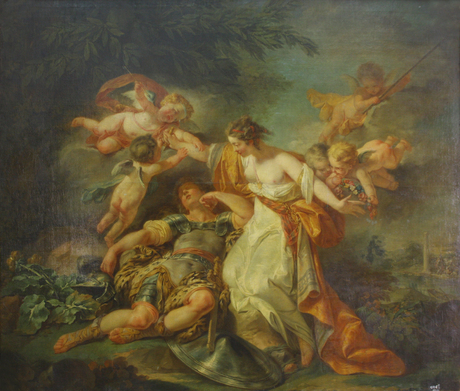
J-H. Fragonard, Rinaldo and Armida

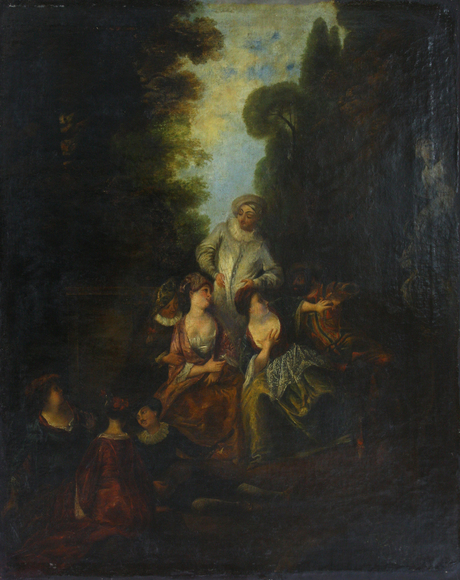
N. Lancret, The Italian actors

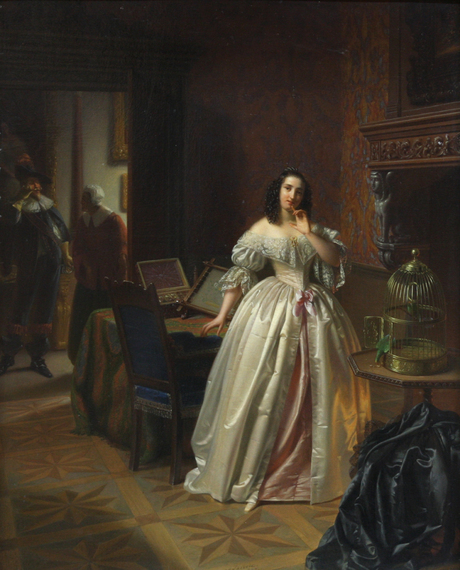
E. Delacroix, The guest
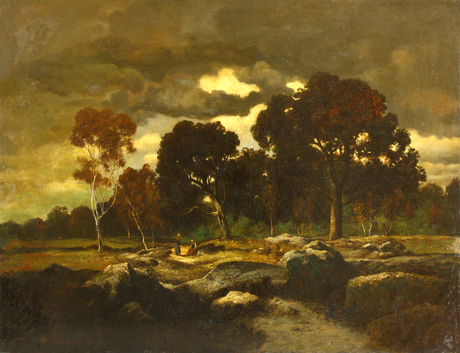
T. Rousseau, Dusk in a forest

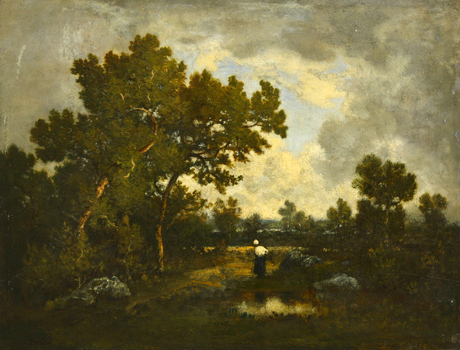
N. V. Díaz, Landscape

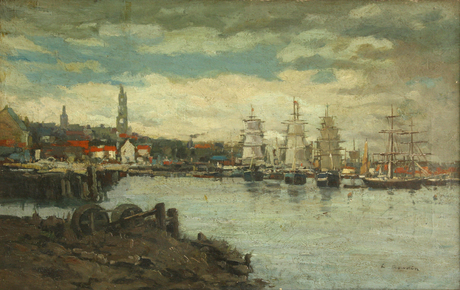
E. Boudin, Sea port

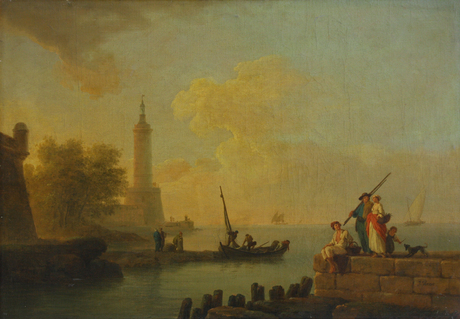
J. Vernet, Sea view

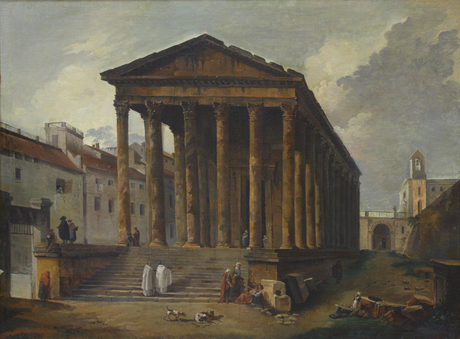
H. Robert, Ancient temple

=== Spanish, German and other artists ===
The Spanish art school is represented by several works, one of them is The Descent from the Cross, painting of the prominent representative of Spanish mannerism – Luis de Morales. The collection includes etching "Bulls" by the outstanding master of romantic period - Francisco Goya, "The Moment of Lecture" by Marià Fortuny, one of the leaders of romantic orientalism. Recently the Gallery received 4 graphic works of Salvador Dalí. German art is represented by landscape painters Jacob Philipp Hackert, Johann Heinrich Roos and others. Collection also includes 9 graphics of the outstanding German painter Albrecht Dürer, engraining "Christ presented to the people" by Sebald Beham, graphic work of Franz Stuck and others.

Beside works of Spanish and German artists, the Gallery owns paintings of Swiss artists Alexandre Calame, Louis Léopold Robert, paintings of Daniel Chodowiecki, January Suchodolski, Ion Andreescu, Ștefan Dimitrescu and others.

== Russian art ==
Russian art is also extensively present in the NPGA's collection. Around 230 works of art are exhibited in the gallery. Russian secular art is represented from the middle of the 18th century. Collection of the gallery encompasses portraits and sculptures from the end of XVIII – beginning of XIX centuries including works of Ivan Argunov, Dmytro Levytsky, Fyodor Rokotov, Vladimir Borovikovsky, Ivan Martos and Fedot Shubin. Russian landscape art of the 18th century is represented by several canvases by Fyodor Matveyev and Mikhail Ivanov.

Russian painting of the first half of the 19th century is represented by works of Orest Kiprensky, 4 canvases of Vasily Tropinin, 3 works of Sylvester Shchedrin, works of Karl Bryullov, Pyotr Basin and others. Art works of Henryk Siemiradzki, Sergey Zaryanko, Ivan Khrutsky and Vasily Serebryakov depict the second half of the 19th century.

The turn of the XIX-XX centuries is presented by works of Alexandre Benois, artists of the symbolism movement Boris Anisfeld and Victor Borisov-Musatov, and works of Russian avangard. Collection of that period includes such masterpieces as "Summer residence" by Marc Chagall and 2 works of Wassily Kandinsky. There are also 5 works of Ivan Shishkin, 10 works of Isaac Levitan, multiple works of Vasily Surikov, Ilya Repin, Valentin Serov, Arkhip Kuindzhi, Vasily Vereshchagin, Konstantin Makovsky, Vladimir Makovsky, Vasily Polenov, Mikhail Vrubel, Mikhail Nesterov, Kuzma Petrov-Vodkin and others. The museum holds the most complete collection of paintings of Ivan Aivazovsky - around 60 paintings.

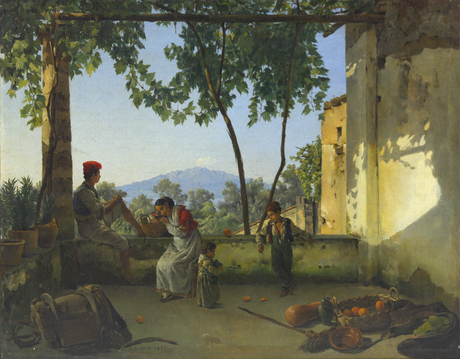
S. Shchedrin, Balcony. In Sorrento

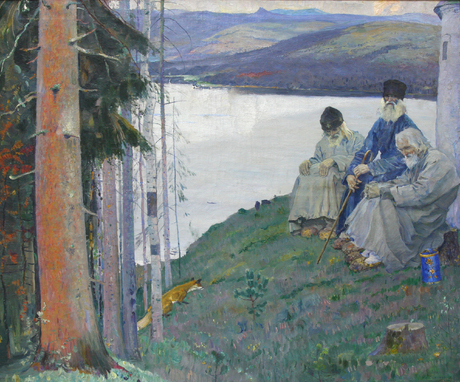
M. Nesterov, Three old men

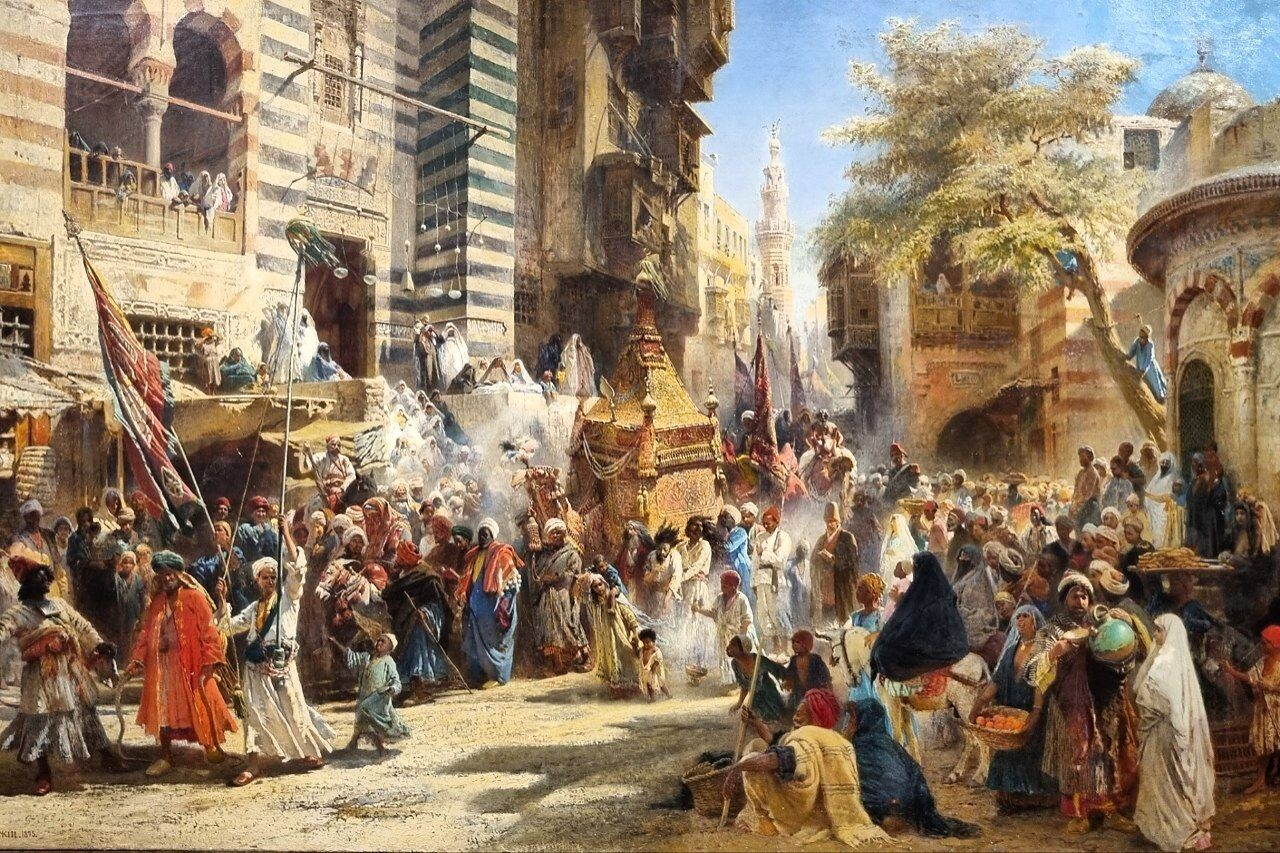
K. Makovsky, Muhammed's carpet moving from Mecca to Cairo

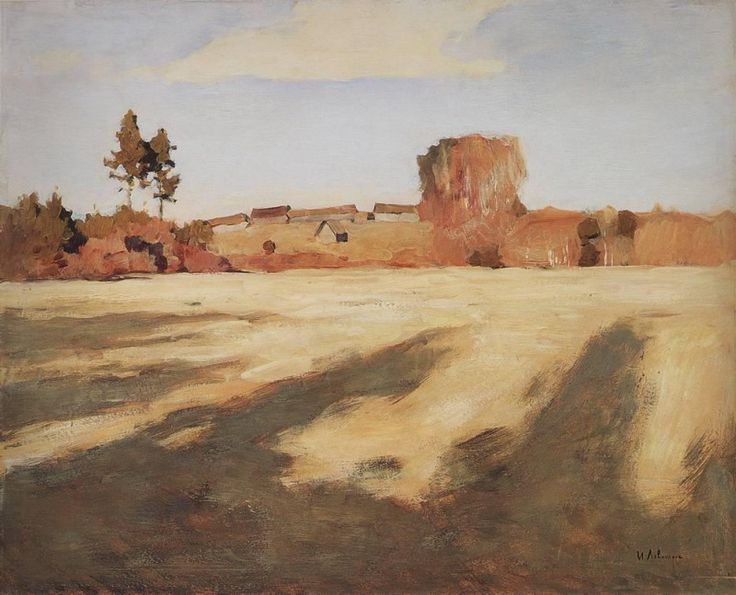
I. Levitan, Autumn. Sunny Day

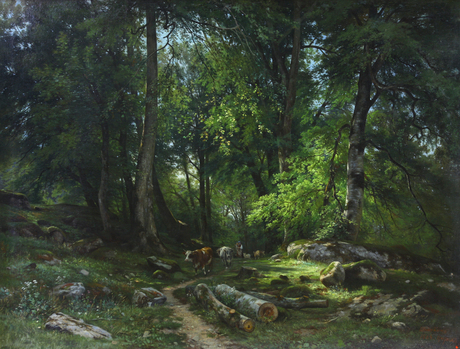
I. Shishkin, In the forest
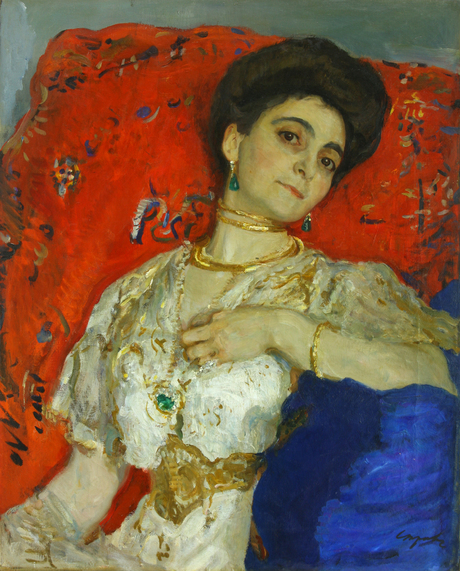
V. Serov, Portrait of M. N. Akimova

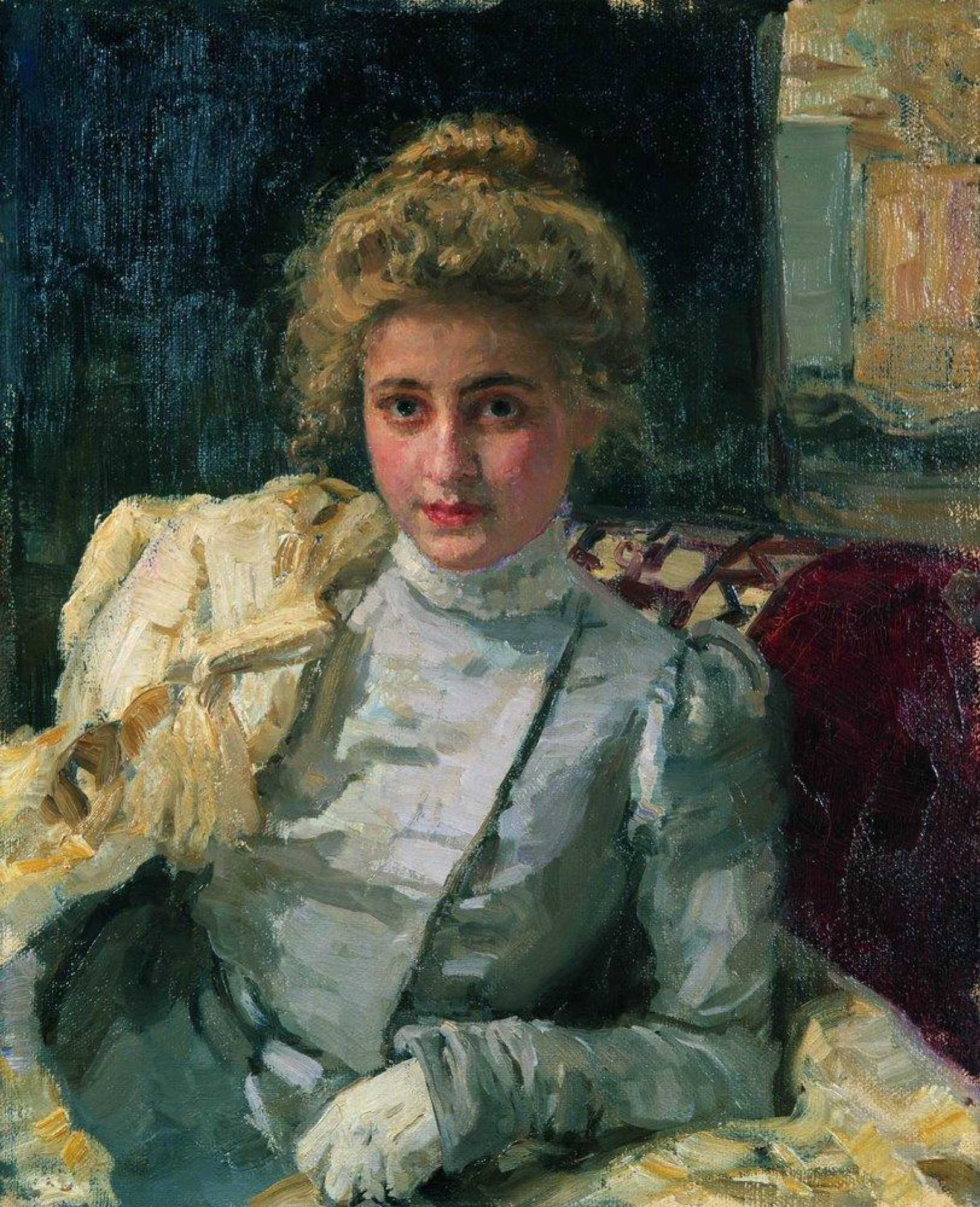
I. Repin, Portrait of Tevashova

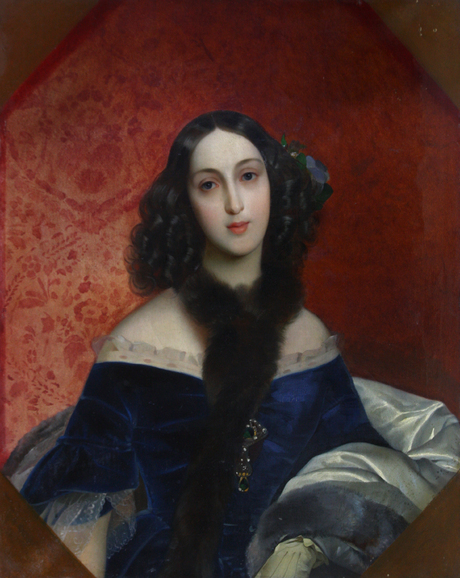
K. Bryullov, Portrait of M. A. Bek

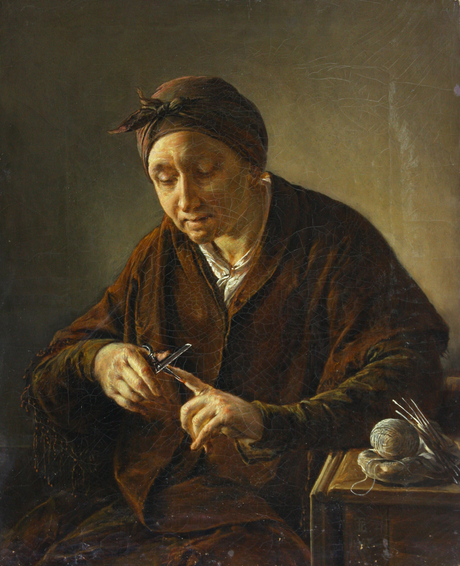
V. Tropinin, Nail cutting woman

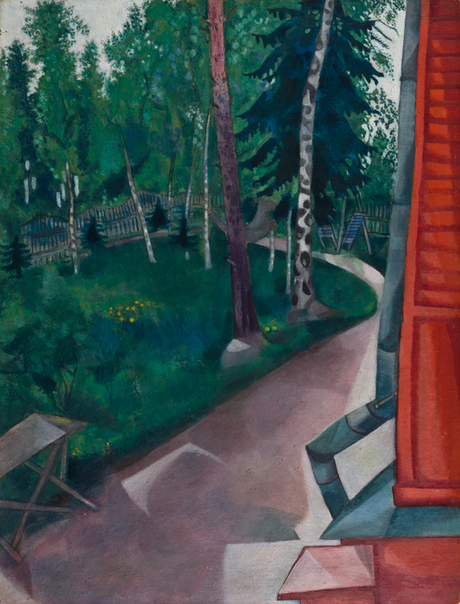
M. Chagal, Summer residence

== Directors ==
In the years prior the gallery was directed by:

- Marina Hakobyan (2020)
- Arman Tsaturyan (2015-2020)
- Pharaon Mirzoyan (2002–2015)
- Shahen Khachatryan (1991–2002)
- Alexandr Ter-Gabrielyan (1987–1990)
- Eduard Isabekyan (1967–1987)
- Armen Chilingaryan (1962–1967)
- Ruben Parsamyan (1952–1962)
- Ruben Drampyan (1925–1951)

== See also ==
- List of national galleries
- Lydia Durnovo, art historian and restorer
