= Yeghishe Tadevosyan =

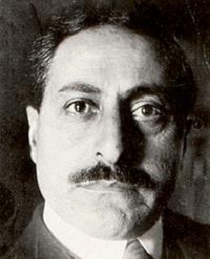
Yeghishe Tadevosyan

Yeghishe Martirosi Tadevosyan (Armenian: Եղիշե Մարտիրոսի Թադևոսյան; 24 September 1870 – 22 January 1936) was a Soviet Armenian painter, associated with the Peredvizhniki and Mir Iskusstva movements. He was known for his landscape and portrait paintings. Tadevosyan was awarded the title of "Honored Artist" by the Armenian SSR in 1935.

== Biography ==
Yeghishe Martirosi Tadevosyan was born on 24 September 1870 in Etchmiadzin, Russian Empire (now known as Vagharshapat, Armenia).

He studied at the Lazarian School, then entered the Moscow School of Painting, Sculpture and Architecture. Vasily Polenov was his teacher and friend. He graduated in 1894 and participated in an exhibition of the Peredvizhniki in the same year.

In 1898, he travelled to Palestine with Polenov and would revisit the Middle East several times. In 1901, he moved from Moscow to Tbilisi and became an art teacher.

His early work had been influenced by Vardges Sureniants but, after this time, he began to employ impressionistic and pointillistic techniques. In 1916, he became one of the four founders and the elected head of the Union of Armenian Artists.

== Death and legacy ==
Yeghishe Tadevosyan died on 22 January 1936 in Tbilisi and is buried at Komitas Pantheon which is located in the city center of Yerevan.

Tadevosyan's name is used for a street in Yerevan, and he is the namesake of an art school in Etchmiadzin (now Vagharshapat). In 2015, a bust of Tadevosyan's head was unveiled in the Shengavit District in Yerevan. His works Self-portrait, Canal and Gondola, and One of My Dreams were reproduced on the postal stamps of Armenia in 1997 and 2020.

In 2015 to 2016, the National Gallery of Armenia held a retrospective of his work.

== Gallery ==
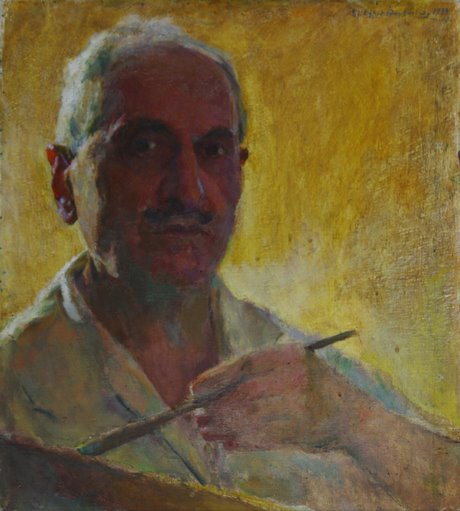
Self-portrait (1933)

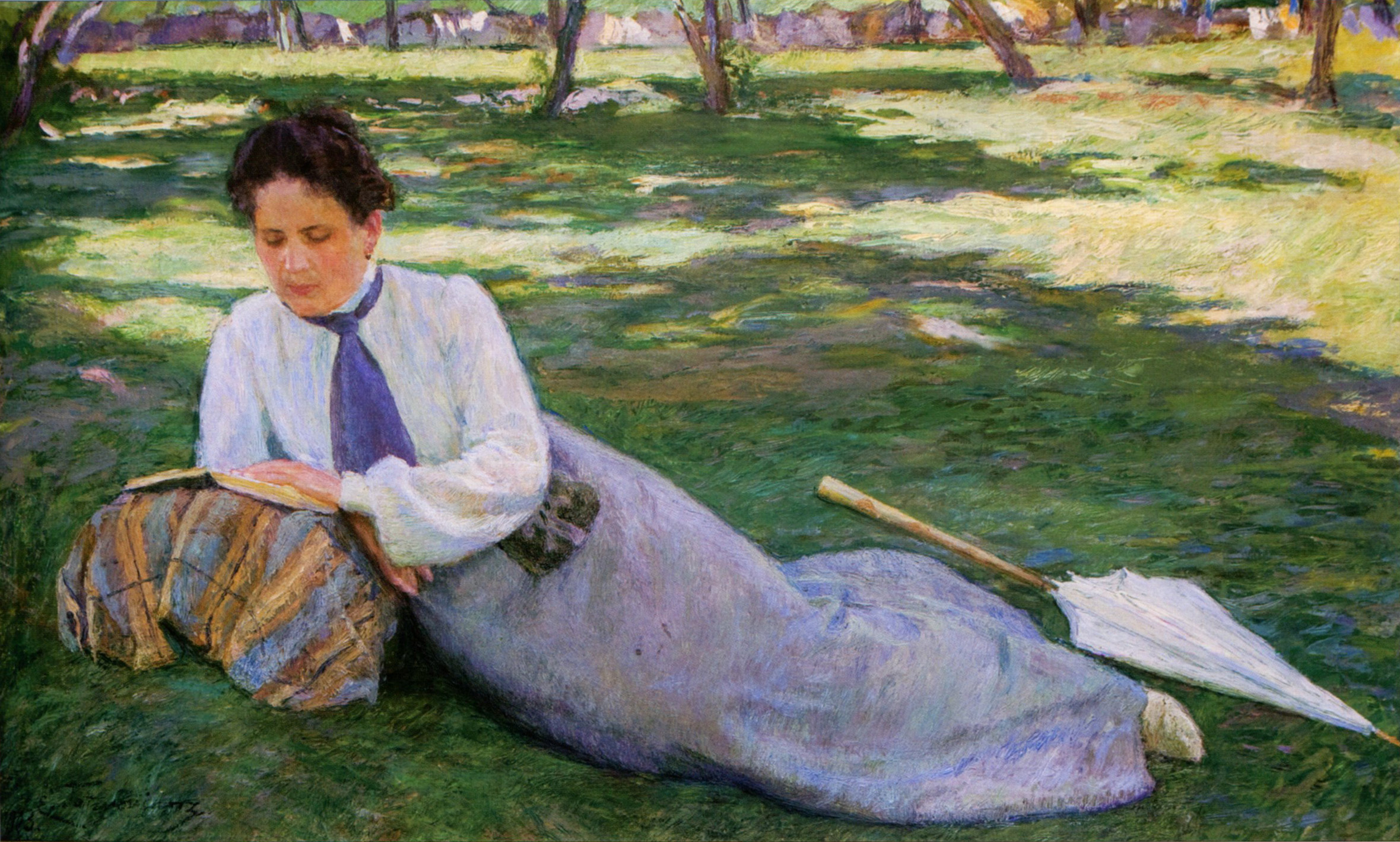
A woman, reading in the garden (1903)

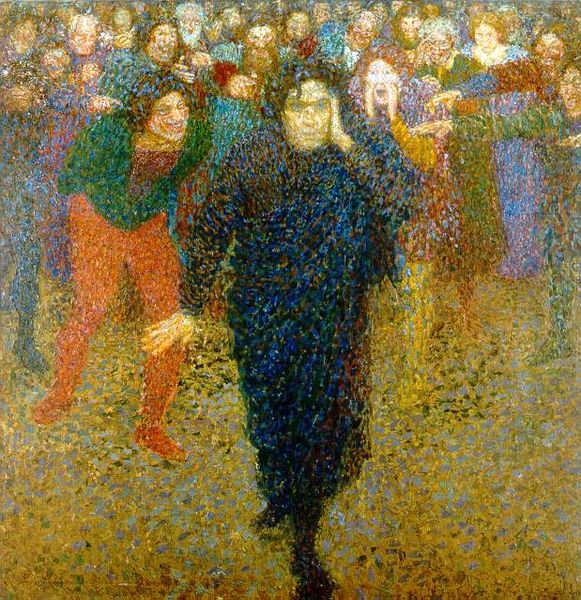
The Genius and the Crowd (1909)

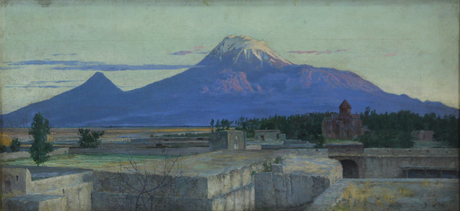
Mount Ararat from Etchmiadzin (1895)

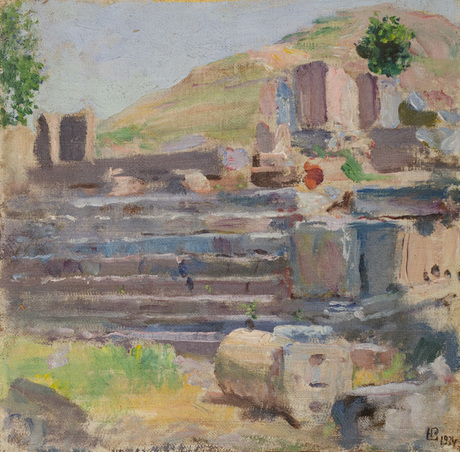
Garni (1934)

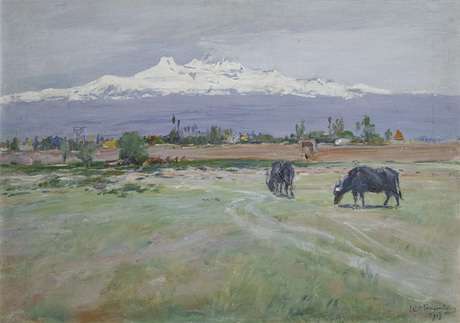
Mount Aragats (1917)

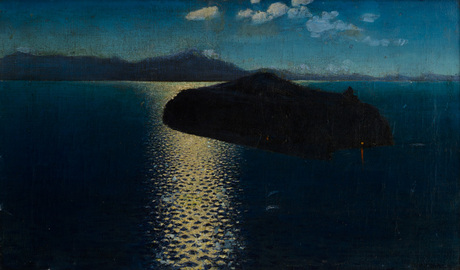
Lake Sevan in the night

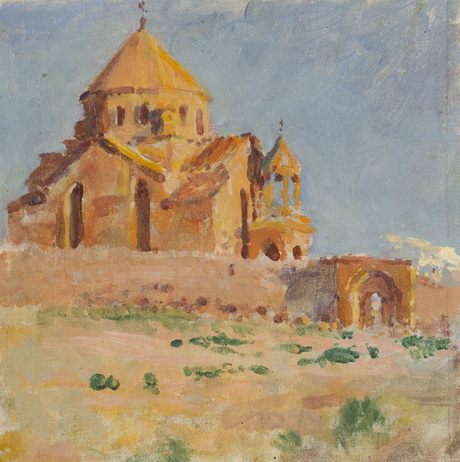
Saint Hripsime Church (1913)
