= Hakob Gyurjian =

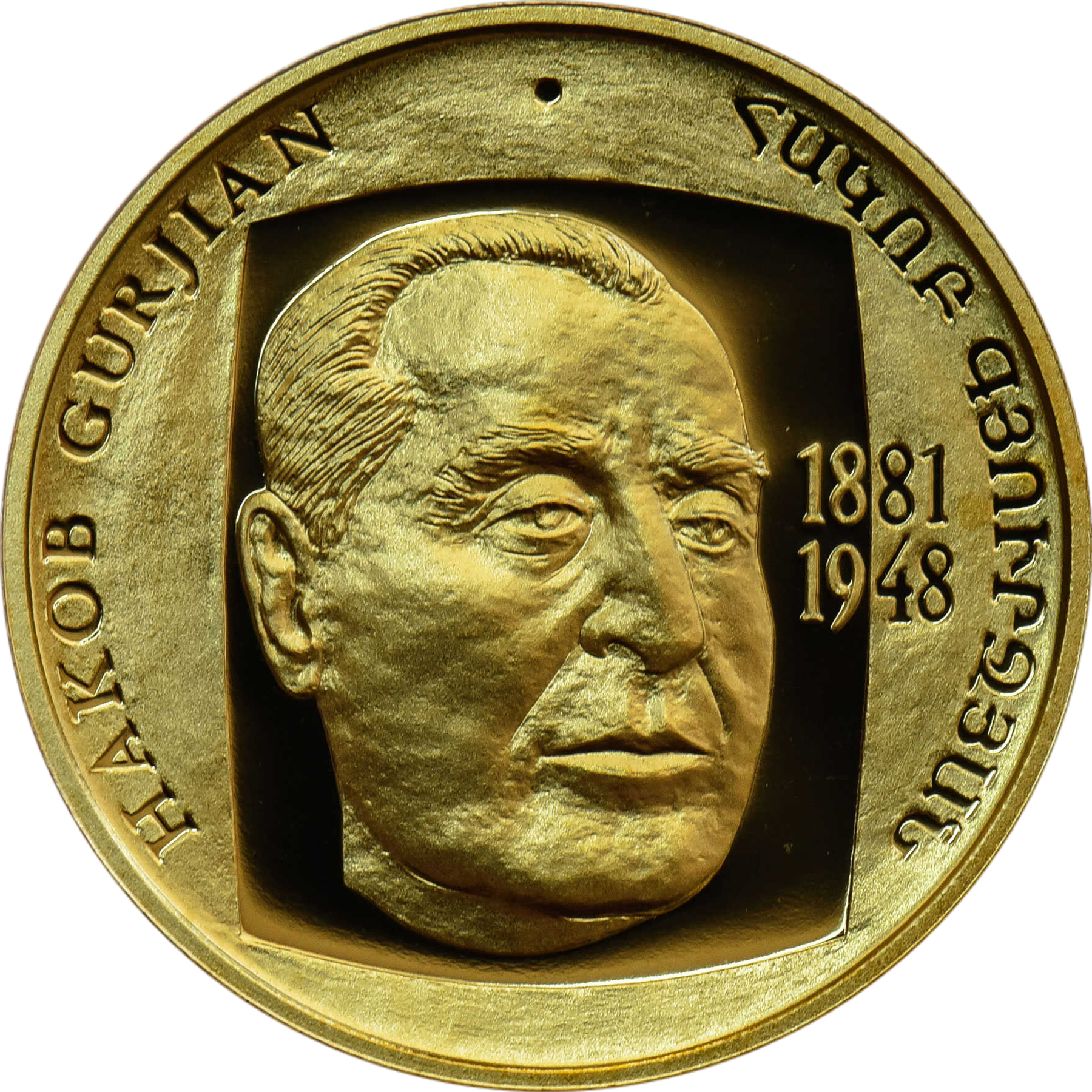

Hakob Gyurjian (Gurdjian) (Armenian: Հակոբ Մարգարի Գյուրջյան; December 17 [O.S. December 5], 1881 – December 28, 1948) was an Armenian sculptor.

== Biography ==
Gyurjian was born in Shushi and studied at the Académie Julian in Paris and in Auguste Rodin's studio. From 1914 to 1921, he worked in Moscow (Vladimir Lenin participated in the opening of a monument by Gyurjian). From 1921, he lived in Paris.

== Famous works ==
He was the author of over 300 sculpture portraits (Feodor Chaliapin, Sergei Rachmaninoff, Ludwig van Beethoven, Vahan Terian, Martiros Saryan, Georgy Yakulov, etc.), also “Diana”, “Nude woman”, “Adolescence” and many others are famous sculptures. The National Gallery of Armenia has a big collection of Gyurjian's works. He died in Paris, at the age of 67.

== Bibliography ==
Gautier М., A. Gurdjan, P., 1954.
