= Pharaon Mirzoyan =

Pharaon Mirzoyan Փարավոն Միրզոյան
- Born: December 2, 1949 (age 76); Salvard, Syunik Region
- Known for: Painter
- Awards: Honoured Art Worker of Armenia; People’s Artist of Armenia

Pharaon Mirzoyan (Armenian: Փարավոն Միքայելի Միրզոյան; born December 2, 1949) is an Armenian painter, the director of the National Gallery of Armenia.

== Biography ==
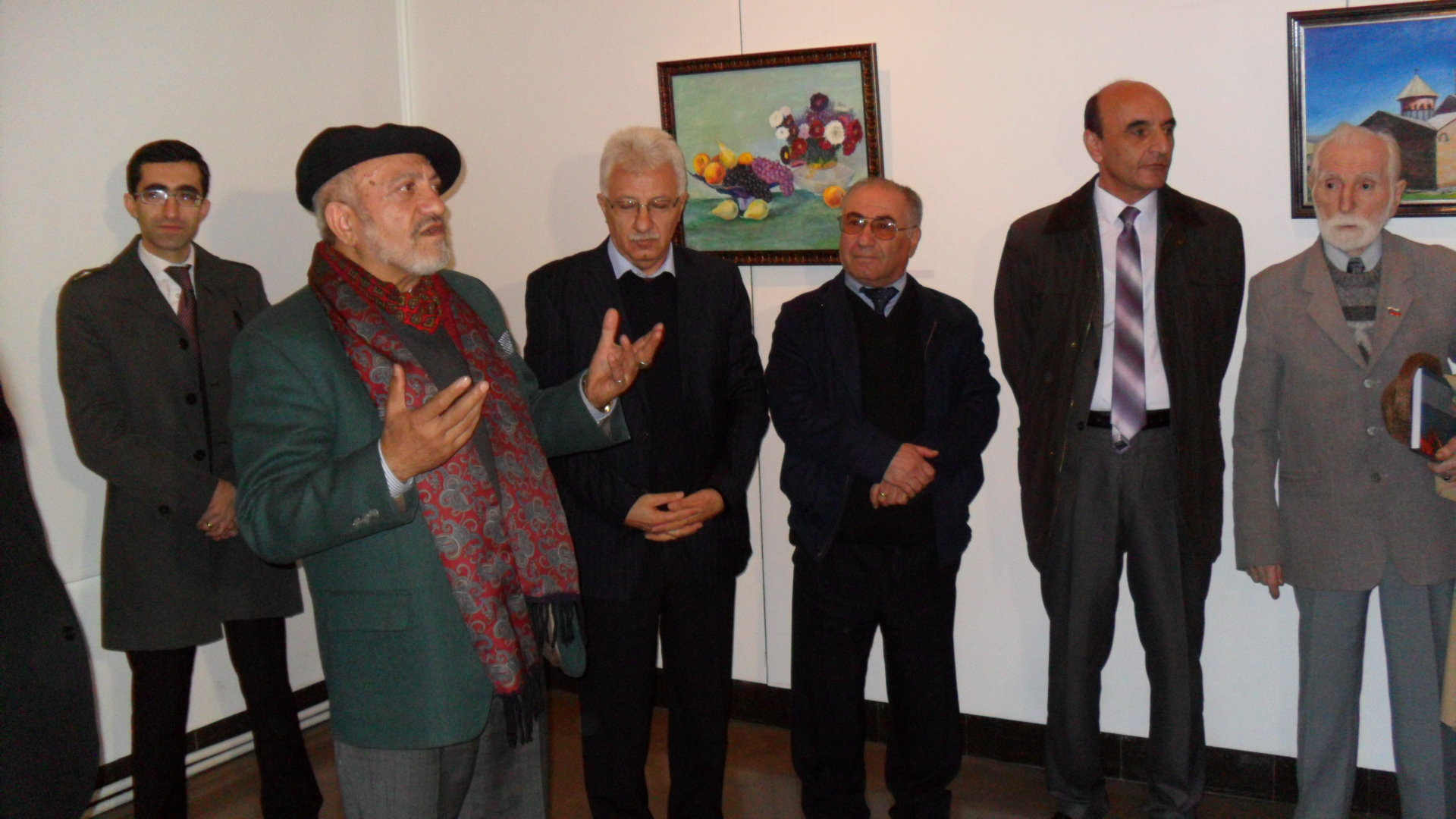

1975 Graduated from the Leningrad State Academy of Fine Arts after I. Repin, since 1975 he participates in republican, all-union and international exhibitions. 1975 Lecturer at Yerevan State Academy of Fine Arts, 1976 Member of Union of Artists of the USSR, 1977-1979 Scholar of Union of Artists of the USSR. Since 1989 head of the art studio of Yerevan State Academy of Fine Arts. 1989-2002 Head of the Chair of Painting and Composition at Yerevan State Academy of Arts, 1995 Professor of the Chair of Painting and Composition (Russian Federation). 2002-2015 Pharaon Mirzoyan has been the director of the National Gallery of Armenia. 2005 Decorated with the title “Honoured Citizen of Sisian”. Since 2014 Head of the chair of Fine Arts at Yerevan State Pedagogical University after Khachatur Abovyan

Pharaon Mirzoyan’s works are preserved in the museums of Armenia, Russia, Ukraine, the United States, France, India, Syria, Spain, as well as in private collections

== Personal exhibitions ==
- 1989 Permanent Mission of Armenia in Moscow
- 1995 Union of Artists of Armenia, Yerevan
- 2000 National Gallery of Armenia, Yerevan
- 2005 National Gallery of Armenia, Yerevan, Sisian and Etchmiadzin
- 2005 Exhibition of pastel artworks, National Gallery of Armenia, Yerevan
- 2007 Exhibitions in Vanadzor and Gyumri
- 2010 Union of Artists of Armenia, Yerevan and Stepanakert (Nagorno Karabakh)
- 2010 Personal Exhibition in Stepanakert (Artsakh Republic), exhibition of “Artsakh” panel in the Liberty Square
- 2010 Personal exhibition dedicated to the 300th anniversary of Armenian Community of Saint Petersburg, hall of Union of Artists of Saint Petersburg
- 2010 Personal exhibition in Novi Sad city, Serbia
- 2014 Personal exhibition in the State Central Museum of Contemporary History of Russia, Moscow
- 2014 Personal exhibition at the National Gallery of Armenia, Yerevan

== Awards ==
- 1986 Awarded the medal “For Labour Virtue”
- 2005 Awarded the “Gold Medal” of the Ministry of Culture of RA
- 2005 Awarded the medal “Aksel Bakunts” (Syunik Region)
- 2006 Honoured Art Worker of Armenia
- 2006 Full member of the Petrov Academy of Fine Arts and Sciences (Saint Petersburg)
- 2007 Awarded the State Reward of Armenia
- 2008 Awarded the order of “Chevalier des Arts et des Lettres”
- 2009 Awarded the gold medal “Fridtjof Nansen”
- 2014 People’s Artist of Armenia

== See also ==
- List of Armenian artists
- List of Armenians
- Culture of Armenia
- National Gallery of Armenia

== Books ==
- Hakob Giurjyan 1881-1948 (Armenian) Paperback – 2007, by Pharaon Mirzoyan
