= Arshak Fetvadjian =

Armenian artist (1866–1947)

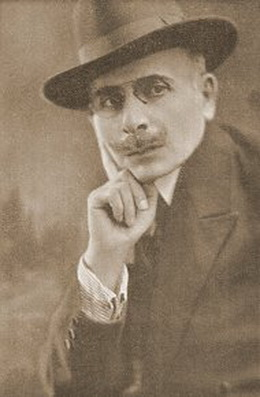
- Arshak Fetvadjian.
- Born: October 1, 1866; Trebizond, Ottoman Empire
- Died: October 7, 1947 (aged 81); Medford, Massachusetts, United States
- Education: State Fine Arts School (Ottoman Empire)
- Notable work: Watercolors of Ani; The Woman of Sasun

Arshak Abrahami Fetvadjian (Armenian: Արշակ Աբրահամի Ֆեթվաճյան; October 1, 1866 – October 7, 1947) was an Armenian artist, painter and designer. He is best known for his watercolor paintings of the architectural monuments of the medieval Armenian city of Ani, and for designing the currency and postage stamps of the first Republic of Armenia (1918–1920). As a result of over 20 years devoted to art, Fetvadjian produced no less than 2,000 works, varying from pencil drawings to watercolors, that depicted historically significant churches, monasteries, chapels and palaces. A considerable number of his other works were also portraits of Armenians at the turn of the 20th century.

== Biography ==
Fetvadjian was born in Trabzon in 1866, in the then Ottoman Empire. He attended a national art institute in the city of his birth and continued his studies at the State Fine Arts School (Imperial Academy of Art) in the capital at Constantinople, which had only been recently opened by an Armenian sculptor named Yervant Vosgan. Fetvadjian graduated from the academy in 1887 and pursued higher learning abroad: he left for Rome and was admitted to the San Luca Art Academy, where he was taken under the wing of Italian painter and sculptor Cesare Maccari.

Fetvadjian's artistic talents were brought into the public spotlight when he participated in the Italian national art exhibition in 1891. His studies would later take him to Vienna (1891–1895) and later St Petersburg. In Russia, he participated in art exhibitions and joined the Russian Artists' Society. Throughout the early 20th century, he continued to hold exhibitions, and his artwork was seen on displays at the Louvre (1919, 1920) and the Victoria and Albert Museum.

== Works ==
=== Watercolors of Ani ===
After Fetvadjian completed his studies in Europe, he traveled to Russian Armenia. He organized several art exhibitions displaying his own works in such major Transcaucasian cities as Batum, Tiflis and Baku. In the early 1900s, Fetvadjian had the opportunity to participate in the excavations led by Russian archaeologist Nicholas Marr of the medieval Armenian capital of Ani, a city which boasted several of the most outstanding examples of Armenian architecture of the High Middle Ages. Some of his most memorable works come from the watercolor paintings of the chapels, palaces, churches and monasteries at Ani which are "factual and literal depictions of the buildings."

=== Caucasus ===
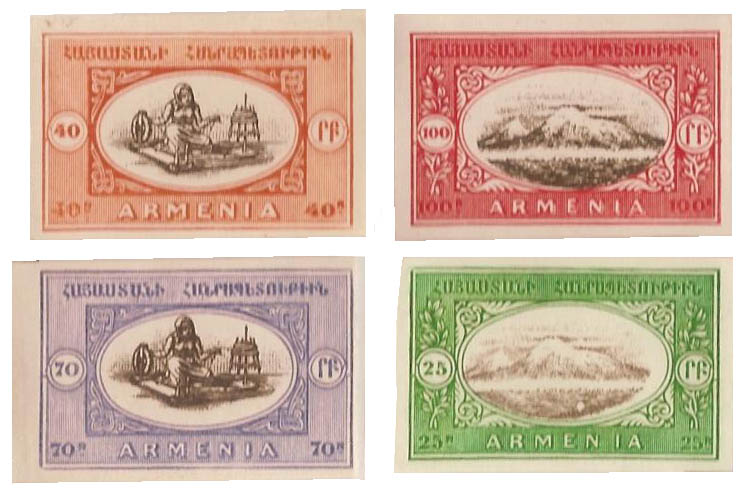
Some of the stamps that Fetvadjian designed for the First Republic of Armenia.

In addition to the historical monuments of Ani, Fetvadjian's paintings also documented other Armenian cultural monuments of the Caucasus (e.g., "Tekor basilica" in Kars), the life and the natural landscape of Armenia (e.g., "Oriental Mail", "Mount Aragats," "Lake Sevan"), and portraits of Armenians and other ethnic peoples. As one of the first artists to depict the Armenian genocide in art, one of Fetvajian's most famous paintings is the "Sasuntsi Kin" ("The Woman of Sasun"). The painting shows a woman breastfeeding her child, a rifle in hand, with the child in the painting representing Armenia.

=== Banknotes and stamps ===
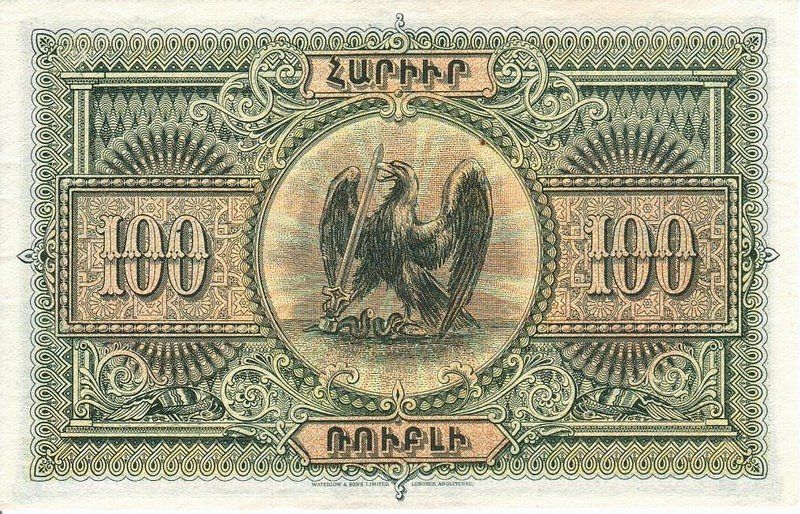
100 ruble note designed for the First Republic of Armenia by Fetvadjian.

Following the creation of the First Republic of Armenia in 1918, the members of the country's Finance Ministry commissioned Fetvadjian to draw up the new currency (to replace the Russian ruble) and stamps for the nascent state. The printing was conducted in Europe, and some of Fetvadjian's attractive designs featured animal motifs that were found on the decorations in Ani. But just as the banknotes were being printed in Paris, Soviet Russia was completing its conquest of the republic and by December 1920, the Armenian state was finally absorbed by the Soviets. The banknotes were never put into circulation.

== Legacy ==
With the fall of the republic, Fetvadjian moved to the United States in 1922 and lived there for the remainder of his years. He continued to paint and was inducted to the art societies of the universities of Harvard, Columbia and Chicago. He died in Medford, Massachusetts in 1947. Although approached by several prestigious American universities to publish his works, Fetvadjian ultimately donated all of his paintings and drawings to the National Gallery of the Armenian Soviet Socialist Republic.

Fetvadjian's works were highly valued for preserving a visual memory of Armenian artwork that otherwise might have been lost forever during the turbulent years following the end of the Russian Empire. Armenian historian Vahan Kurkjian gives credence to that belief, stating "Many valuable relics of Armenian art and architecture of the sixth to thirteenth century, which had escaped the ravages of time were destroyed during the last incursions of 1917-1921, and would have been eventually forgotten had it not been for Fetvadjian's meticulously exact paintings of them."

His remains were interred in the capital Yerevan.

== Gallery ==
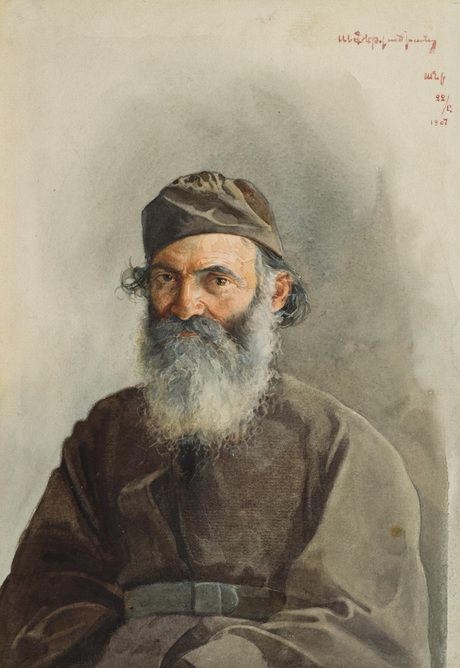
Portrait of Mikayel Vartabed (1907)

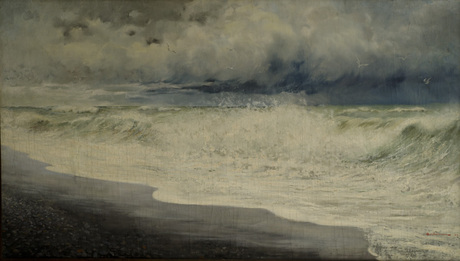
Sea Wave (1903)

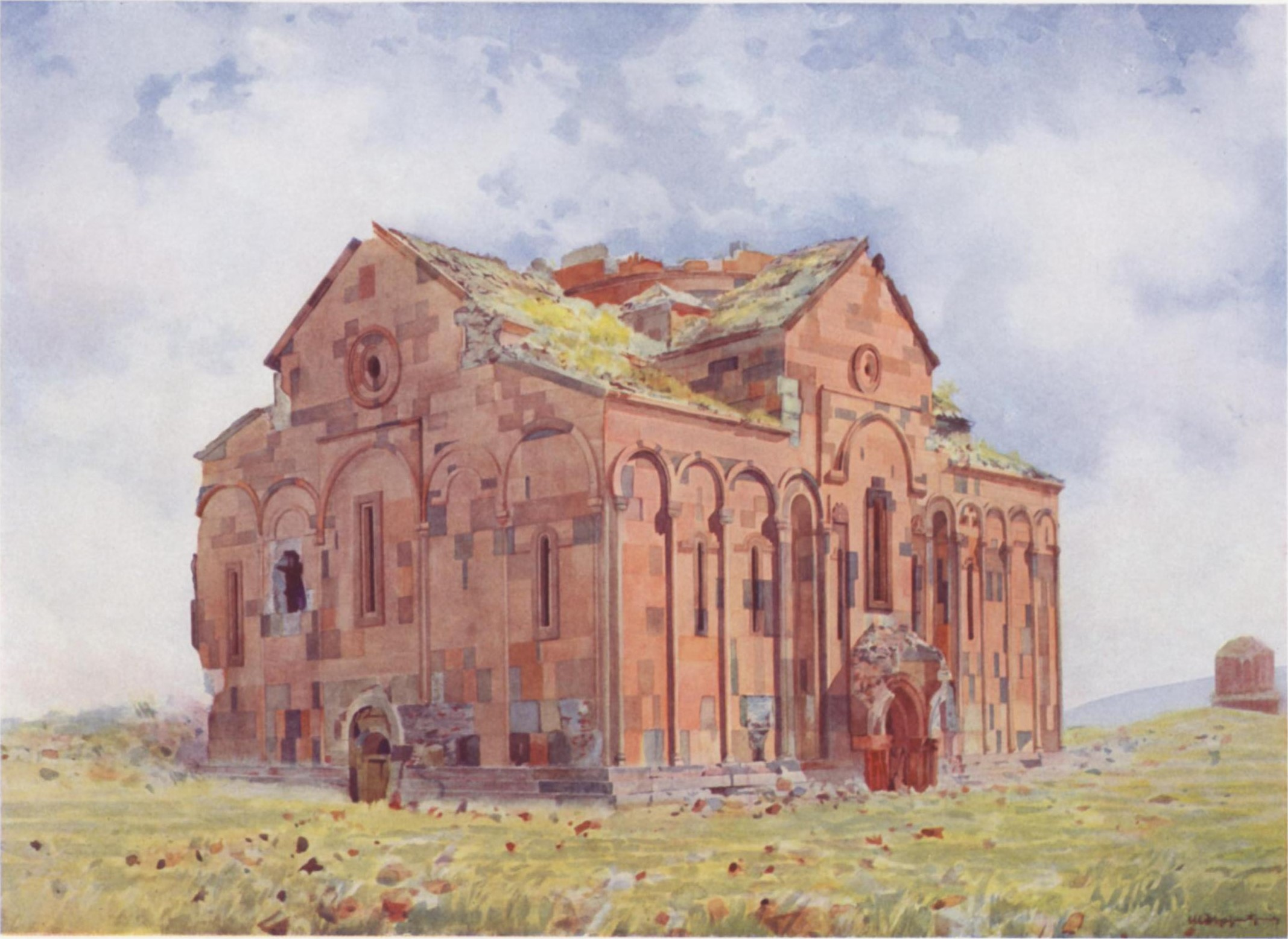
Cathedral of Ani (1905)

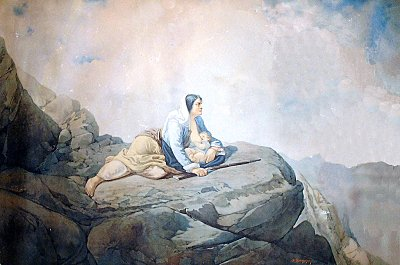
Woman of Sassoun

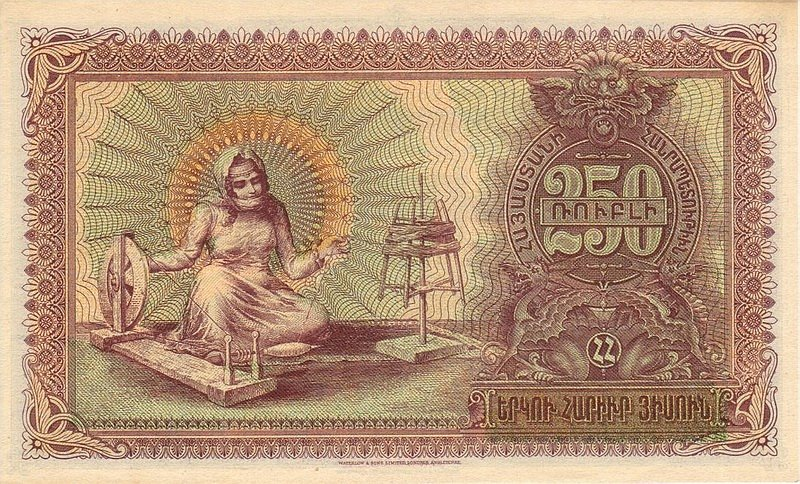
First Republic of Armenia 250 Rubles Bill

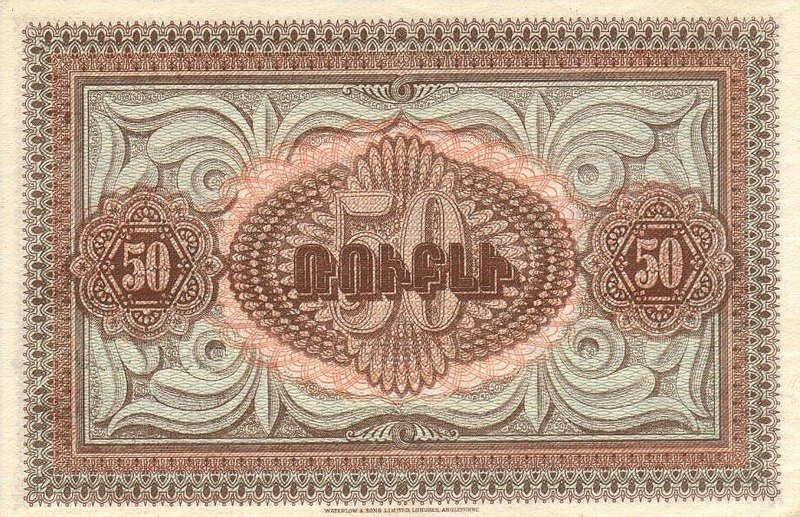
First Republic of Armenia 50 Rubles Bill
