= Vardges Sureniants =

Armenian painter, sculptor, and illustrator

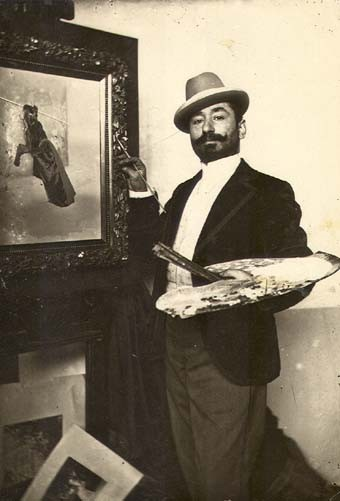
- Born: 27 February [O.S. 10 March] 1860; Akhaltsikhe, Tiflis Governorate, Russian Empire
- Died: 6 April 1921 (aged 61); Yalta, Crimea
- Known for: Painter

Vardges Sureniants (Armenian: Վարդգես Սուրենյանց; 27 February 1860 – 6 April 1921) was an Armenian painter, sculptor, illustrator, translator, art critic, and theater artist. He is considered the founder of Armenian historical painting. His paintings feature scenes from Armenian fairy-tales and various historical events. Although Sureniants had only one exhibition dedicated to his works in his lifetime, he was admired by many of his contemporaries who include many well-known figures in Armenian and Russian society such as Martiros Saryan, Ilya Repin, and Vladimir Stasov.

== Life ==
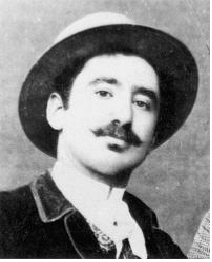
Vardges Sureniants in his youth

Vardges Sureniants was born in Akhaltsikhe, Russian Empire in modern-day Georgia on 27 February 1860. His father, Hakop Sureniants, was a priest and taught religious history. He and his wife, Ustine Sureniants, had five children— four sons and one daughter, with Vardges being the youngest. The Sureniants family moved to Simferopol in 1868. As a family passionate about art, the Surenyants receive a warm welcome from a noble seascape painter Hovhannes Aivazovsky in Simferopol. Around 1868, young Vardges Surenyants joined a travel journey to Bakhchisaray with Aivazovsky’s family, returning full of impressions. He admired the Zuruck Su River, the halls of Abdul Sakhal Girei Khan’s palace, the gardens and the marble fountains. He was especially fascinated with the famous Fountain of Tears, which he later sketched at home with a pencil. That very drawing impressed the famous seascape painter Aivazovsky, who saw a great potential and talent in the young artist’s work. For his drawing, young Vardges Surenyants receives great encouragement from Aivazovsky, who gives him a set of paints as a gesture of support. Sureniants' father was then appointed a presbyter to the Armenian diocese in Moscow. Until the age of 10, Vardges Surenyants did not attend school in either Crimea or Akhaltsikhe. However, by that time, he had gained considerable knowledge in the humanities for his age. He was fluent in both Armenian and Russian, with his proficiency in Armenian being largely attributed to his father. When in Moscow, Sureniants had an opportunity to study at the prestigious Armenian Lazarian School located in the city. On 13 June 1875, the pedagogical council of the Lazarian Seminary decided to award Vardges a scholarship in recognition of his artistic talent, and grant him a place at the prestigious Moscow School of Painting, Sculpture, and Architecture, a leading institution in Russian artistic circles at the time. He began his studies there in 1876 and graduated in 1879. In 1878, after losing his scholarship, Surenyants’s father decided to send him abroad (Stuttgart) to study at the esteemed institutions in Munich Polytechnic. In 1880, after selling a large composition piece (name unknown) for 800 Marks at a student exhibition, Surenyants took a risk and left the Polytechnic Institution after his second year and was admitted to the Academy of Fine Arts, where he studied in the studio of German painter Otto Zeyt, receiving more education in painting and ultimately graduating from the academy in 1885. His father was deeply shocked by this decision and tried everything in his power to change his mind. "I am a painter, and I don’t want to fall behind in two things. I don’t want to be a dilettante in painting. Finally, I do not have the sympathy and strong aspiration for architecture to be able to overcome the difficulties created for me and finish", said he to G. Khalatyan, who visited him at his father’s request to convince him to abandon painting. In 1886, Surenyants traveled extensively to Iran and the South Caucasus. By 1892, he settled in Moscow, where he established his life and career.

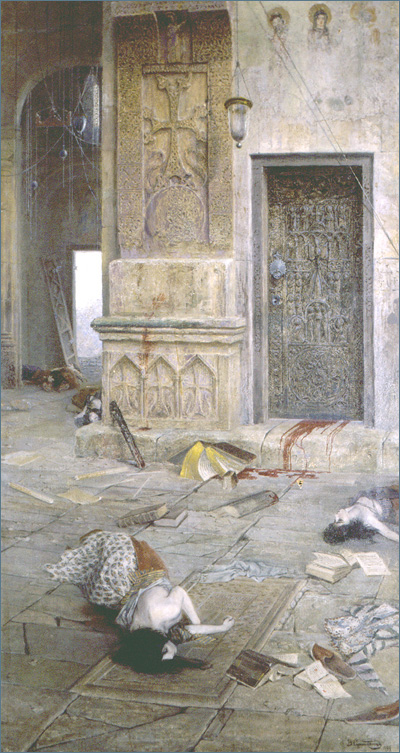
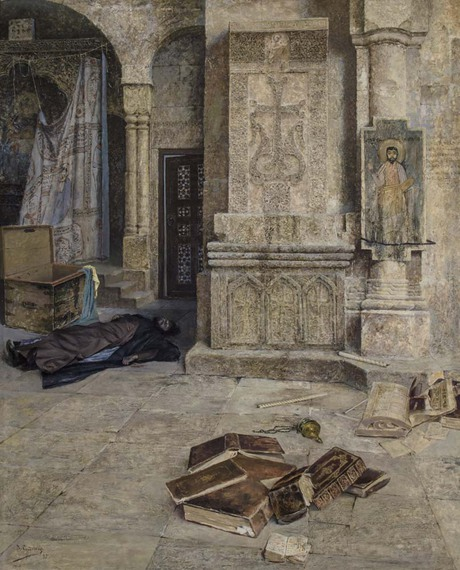
In a response to the Hamidian massacres, Sureniants painted a series of paintings which include After the Massacre (left) in 1899 and Desecrated Shrine (right) in 1895.

He traveled to Italy in 1881 and visited the island of San Lazzaro degli Armeni where the Armenian Catholic congregation of the Mechitarists is located. In their library he studied Armenian fine art and Armenian manuscripts. He created portraits of Mikayel Chamchian and others. In 1883, he wrote his first article which was published in the Armenian newspaper Meghu Hayastani entitled "A Few Words about Armenian Architecture". In 1885–87, he traveled to the Persian cities of Tabriz, Tehran, Isfahan and Shiraz with Russian orientalist Valentin Zhukovski's expedition. After his travels, Sureniants translated William Shakespeare's Richard III and sent it to Constantinople so that actor Bedros Adamian could have it produced. In 1890–91 he taught art history at the Gevorkian Seminary in Armenia.

In 1892 Sureniants visited Ani, Lake Sevan and became familiar with the everyday customs of rural Armenian life. In the same year, he went to Moscow where he became involved in many artistic circles. In 1901 an exhibition of his works was held in Baku. This was to be Sureniants' only exhibition in his lifetime. In 1901–02 he sculpted a bust of the Russian Armenian painter Ivan Aivazovsky.

During the Armenian genocide, Sureniants painted many paintings of survivors who found refuge in Russian Armenia. In 1916 he went to Tiflis, where he and other artists such as Mardiros Saryan and Panos Terlemezian founded the Armenian Artistic Society.

In 1917 Sureniants moved to Yalta where he was commissioned to draw the decorations for the newly built Armenian cathedral. Sureniants decorated the altar, walls, and dome of the church. While decorating the church Surentiants suffered a grave illness. He died on 6 April 1921, and is buried in the premises of the Armenian church of Yalta.

== Work and style ==
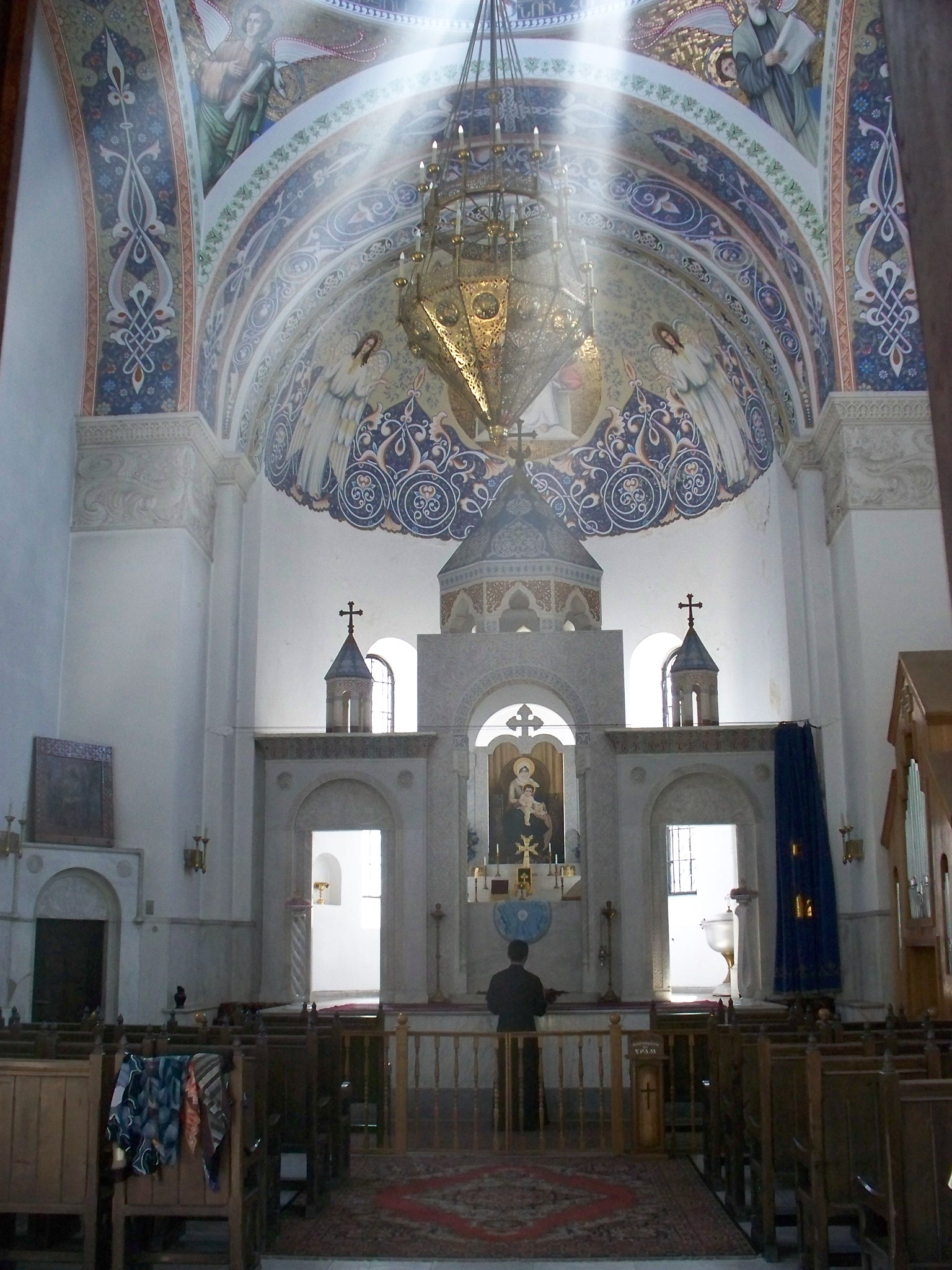
Much of the interior decorations of the Armenian church in Yalta was done by Sureniants

In his early career as an artist, Sureniants became interested in caricatures and sketches during his study at the Lazarian School. While in Munich, Sureniants also worked at painting and line drawing. Some of his caricatures were published in the Fliegende Blätter magazine. He was also known for his illustrations of famous literary works, including Ferdowsi's Shahname, Alexander Pushkin's The Fountain of Bakhchisaray, the fairy tales of Oscar Wilde and works by the Belgian poet Georges Rodenbach, the Armenian writer Smbat Shahaziz and Alexander Tsaturyan.

Sureniants is often categorized as a realist painter. He once said that "painters must paint life the way it appears in front of our eyes." His style reflected this notion through his depiction of landscapes and historical events. He played an instrumental role in reviving Armenian historical events through the medium of art. Pointillism was one of his chief techniques.

== Legacy ==
Despite his success as a painter, Sureniants had only one monographic exhibition in his lifetime. However, there have been many posthumous exhibitions in his honor, including exhibitions at Venice (1924), Yerevan (1931, 1941, 1960, 2010) and elsewhere. The most recent exhibition was held in 2010 in honor of Sureniants' 150th anniversary. During the exhibition, the Prime Minister of Armenia, Tigran Sargsyan, said that:

Sureniants can well be ascribed to the family of the world's best artists, and our State has much to do in this respect: the celebration of his 150th anniversary should launch the process of his international recognition. I happened to discover an exciting detail as I familiarized myself with his life experience. During his lifetime, Sureniants had only one personal exposition: in Baku in 1901. Our initiative is exceptional from this point of view as we have tried to bring to the public's attention all we could collect over time.

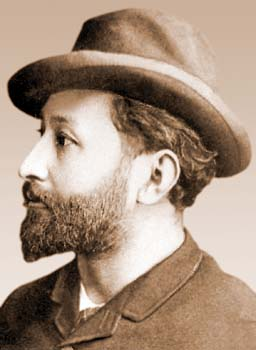
Sureniants in his later years

Sureniants was well known in the art community and enjoyed personal friendships with a number of famous Russian artists including Igor Grabar, Vasily Polenov, Aleksandr Golovin and the sculptors Alexander Matveyev and Nikolay Andreyev.

One admirer of his was the Russian painter Ilya Repin, who said:

The paintings of Vardges Sureniants fascinated me the first time I saw them; he is a bright exemplar of the new [painting] school – his originality is of unusually high proportions, and his passionate love for the slightest detail is outstanding.

Another admirer was the Russian art critic Vladimir Stasov, who said:

Sureniants' superior skill in painting the architecture of the East while paying close attention to the intricate details of its motifs provides his paintings a splendor of colorfulness.

The Armenian painter Martiros Saryan once said of Sureniants that, "with a broad understanding of culture, his best works contained the beating heart of the Armenian nation" and added, "It is therefore certain that Sureniants will last as long as the Armenian people shall last."

== Gallery ==
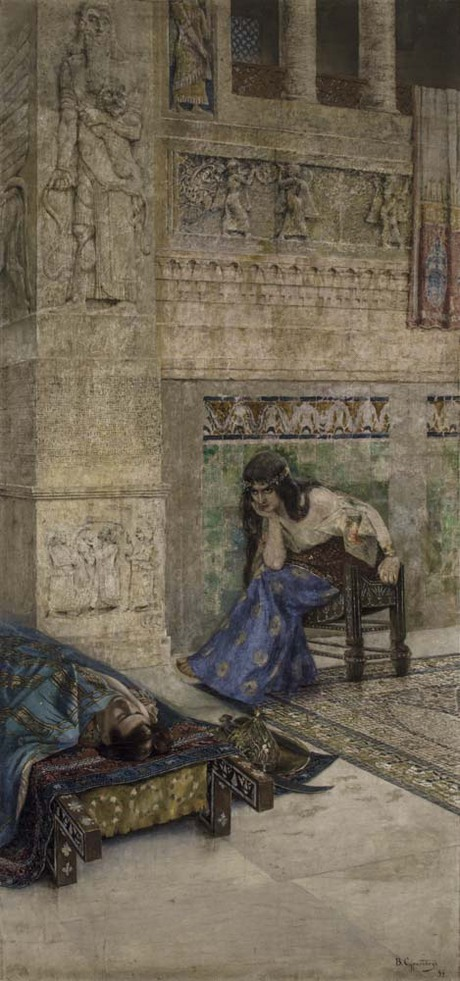
Shamiram and Ara the Beautiful

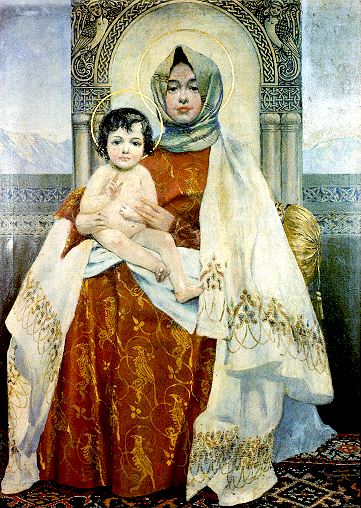
Virgin and Child

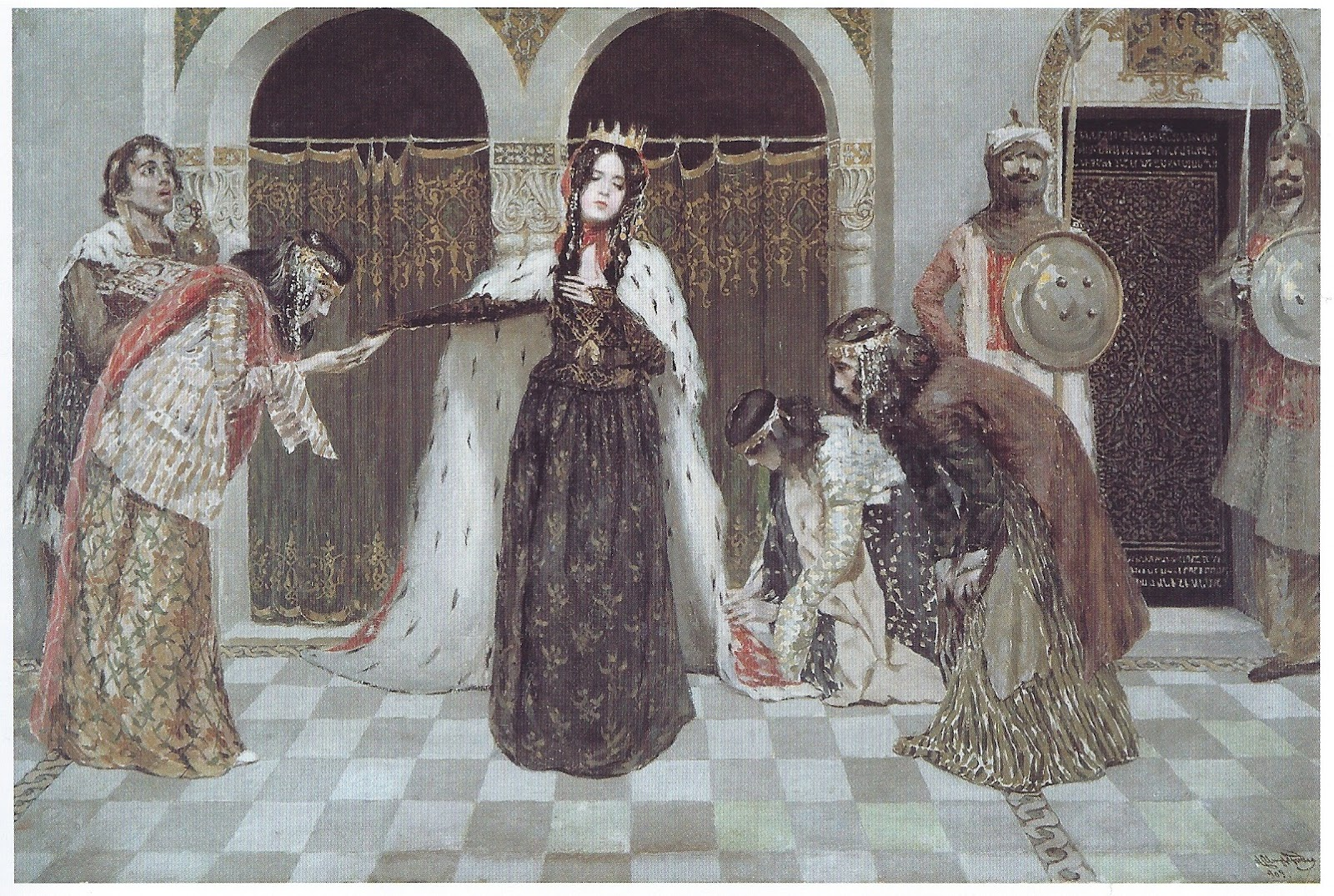
Return of Queen Zabel of Armenia

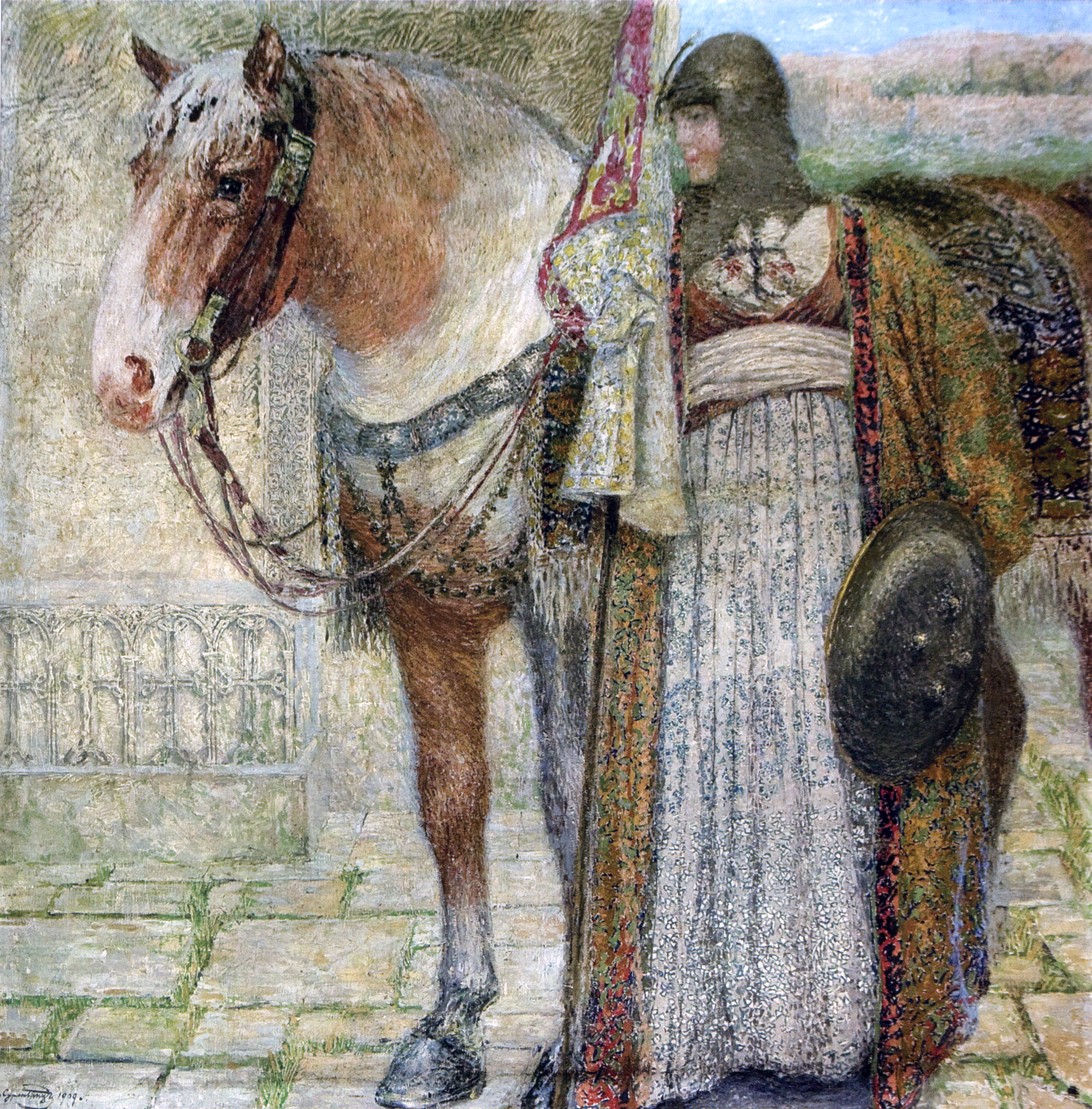
Knight-Woman

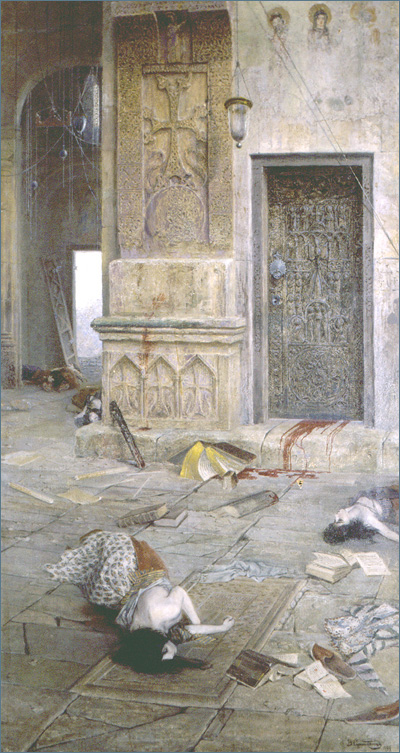
After the Massacre
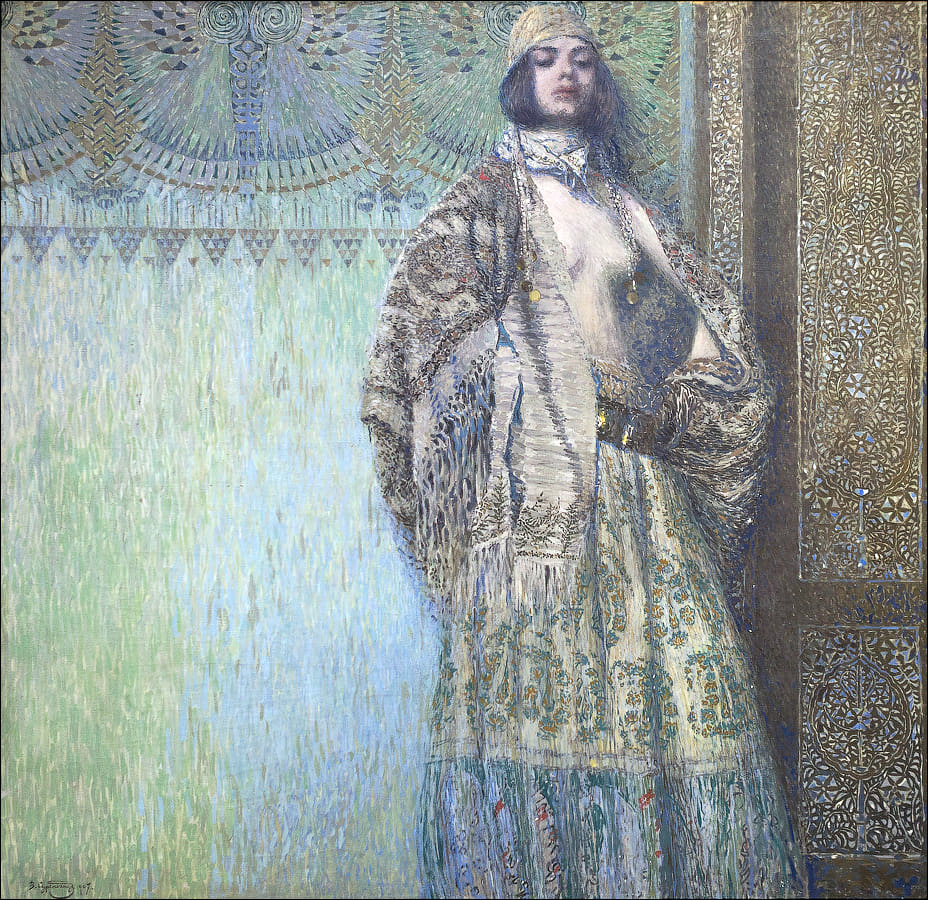
Salome

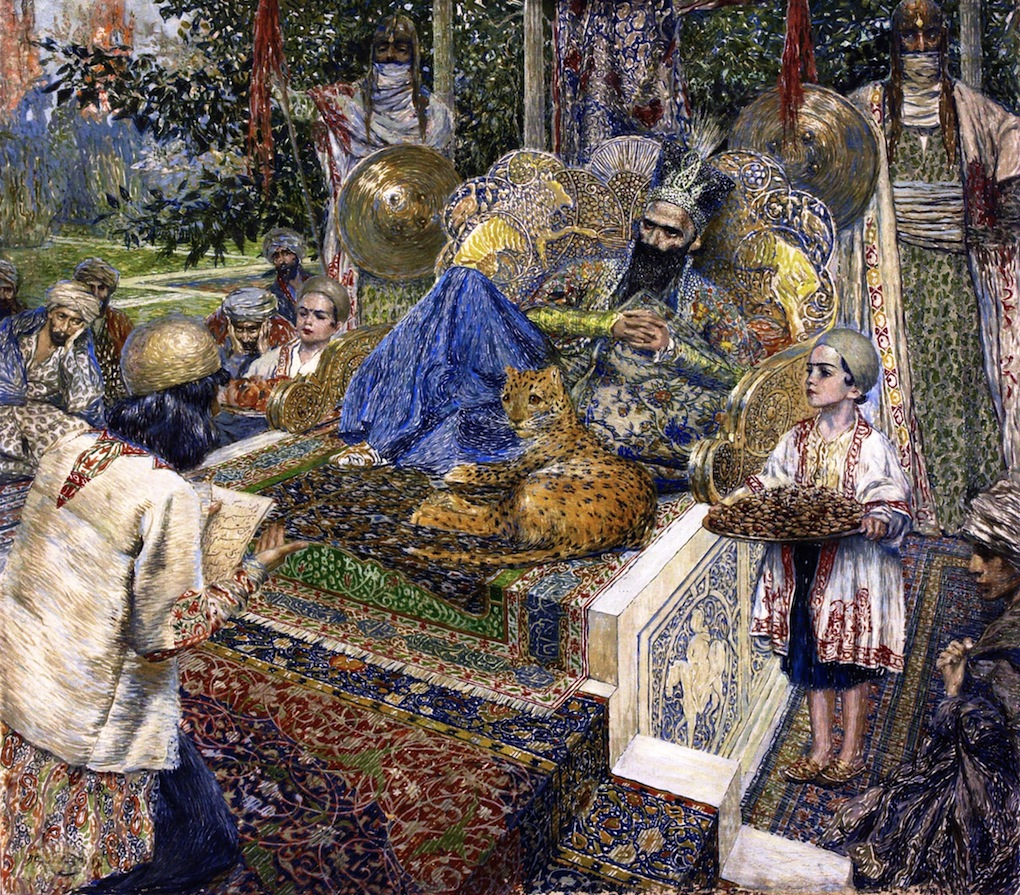
Ferdowsi reading Shahname to Shah Mahmud Ghaznavi

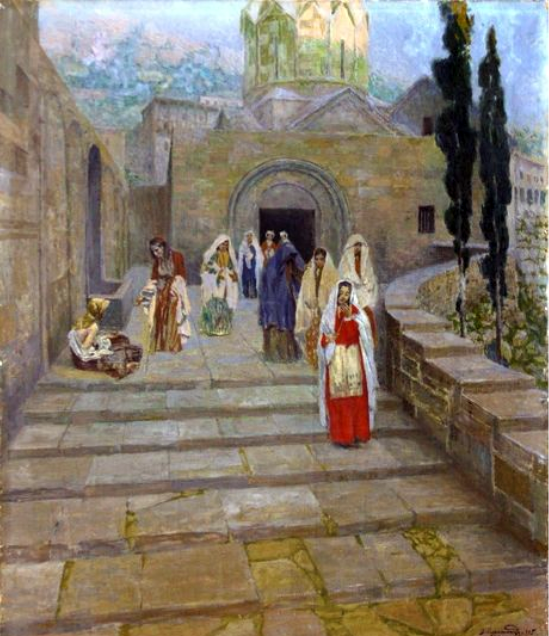
Women Leaving a Church at Ani

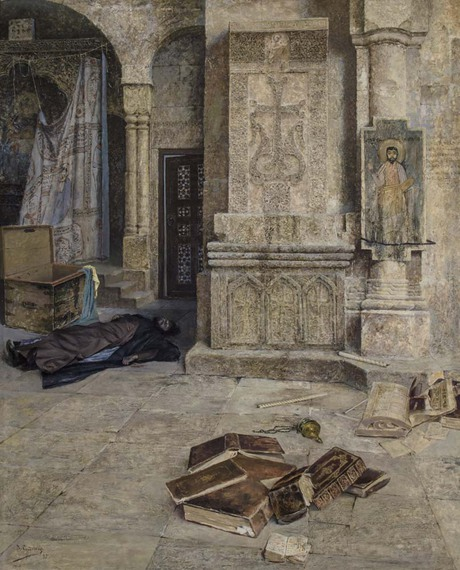
Desecrated Shrine
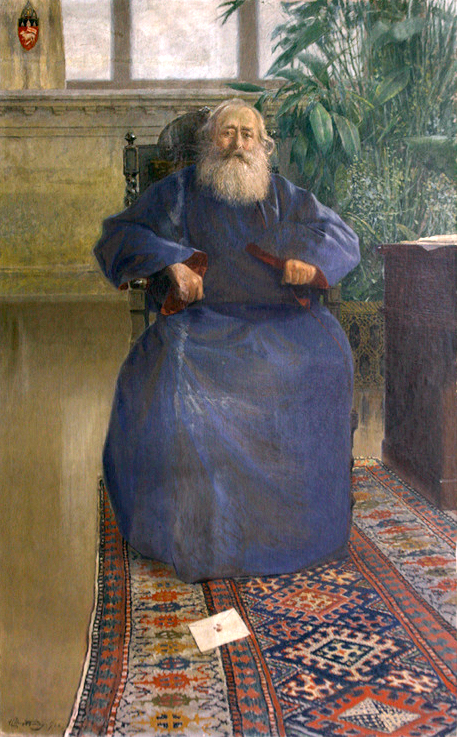
Mkrtich Khrimian

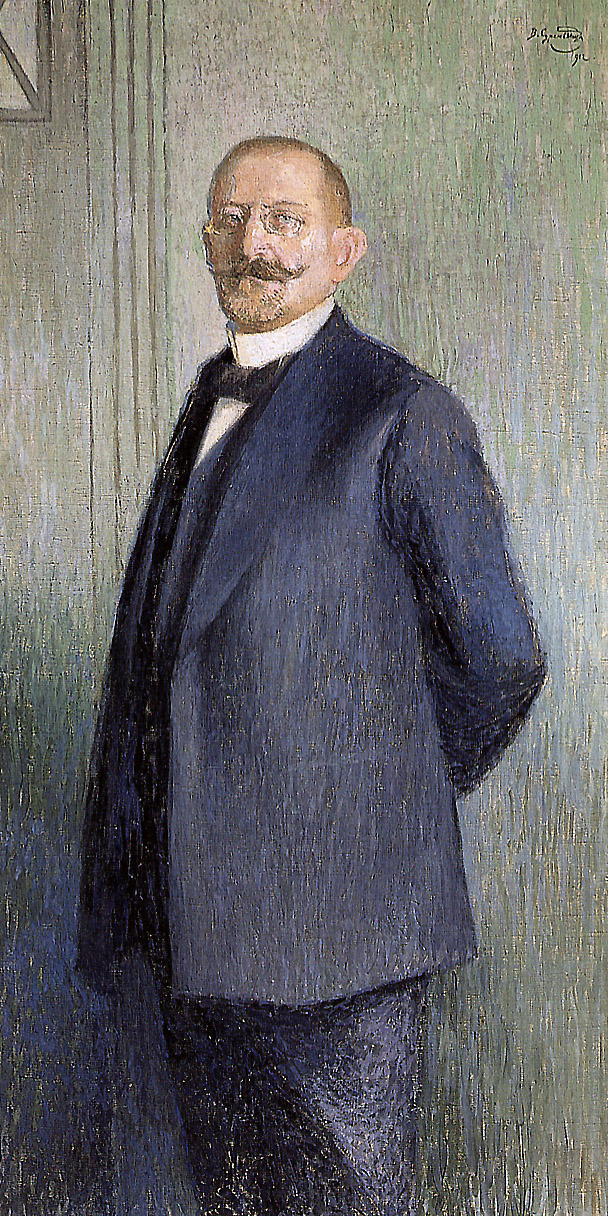
Unknown man

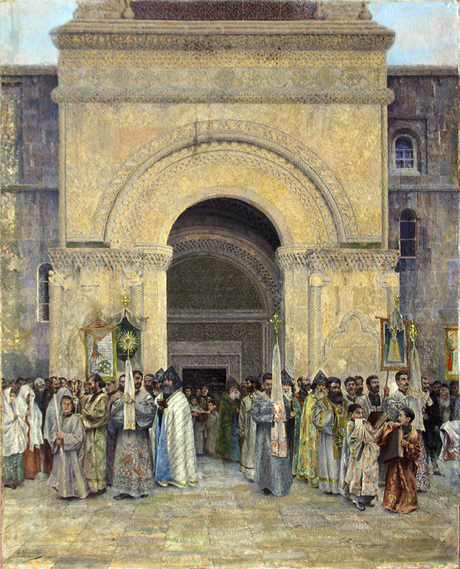
The Departure of the Procession from St. Etchmiadzin Cathedral

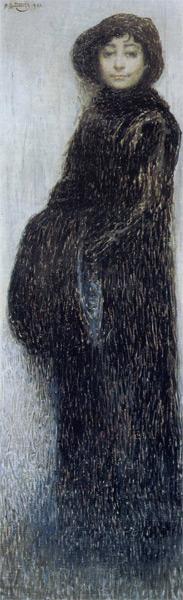
Portrait of Idleson

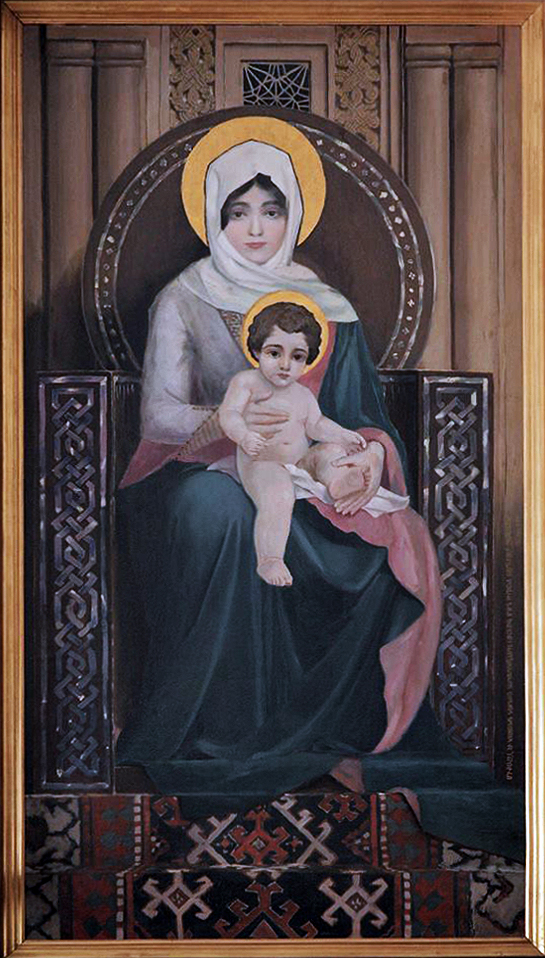
The Virgin
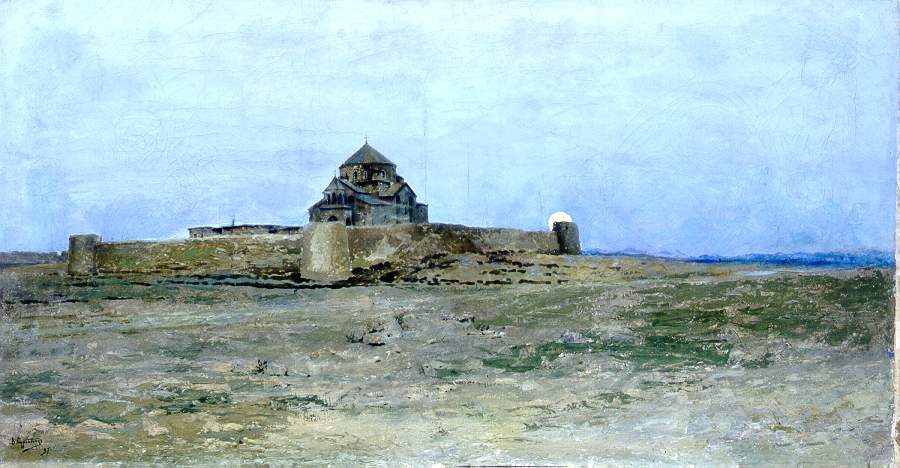
The monastery of St. Hripsime
