= Cathedral of Ani =

Abandoned 11th century cathedral

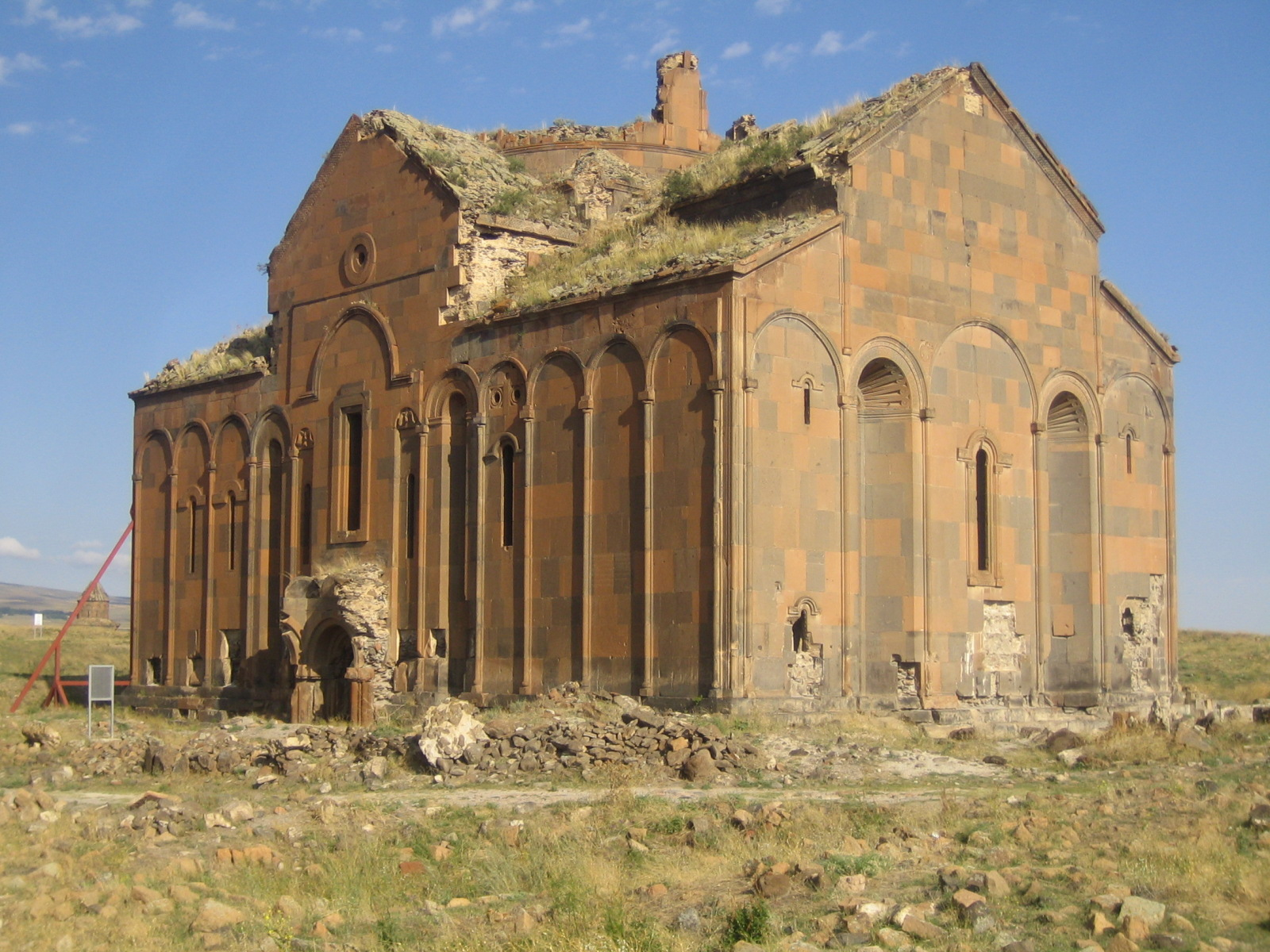
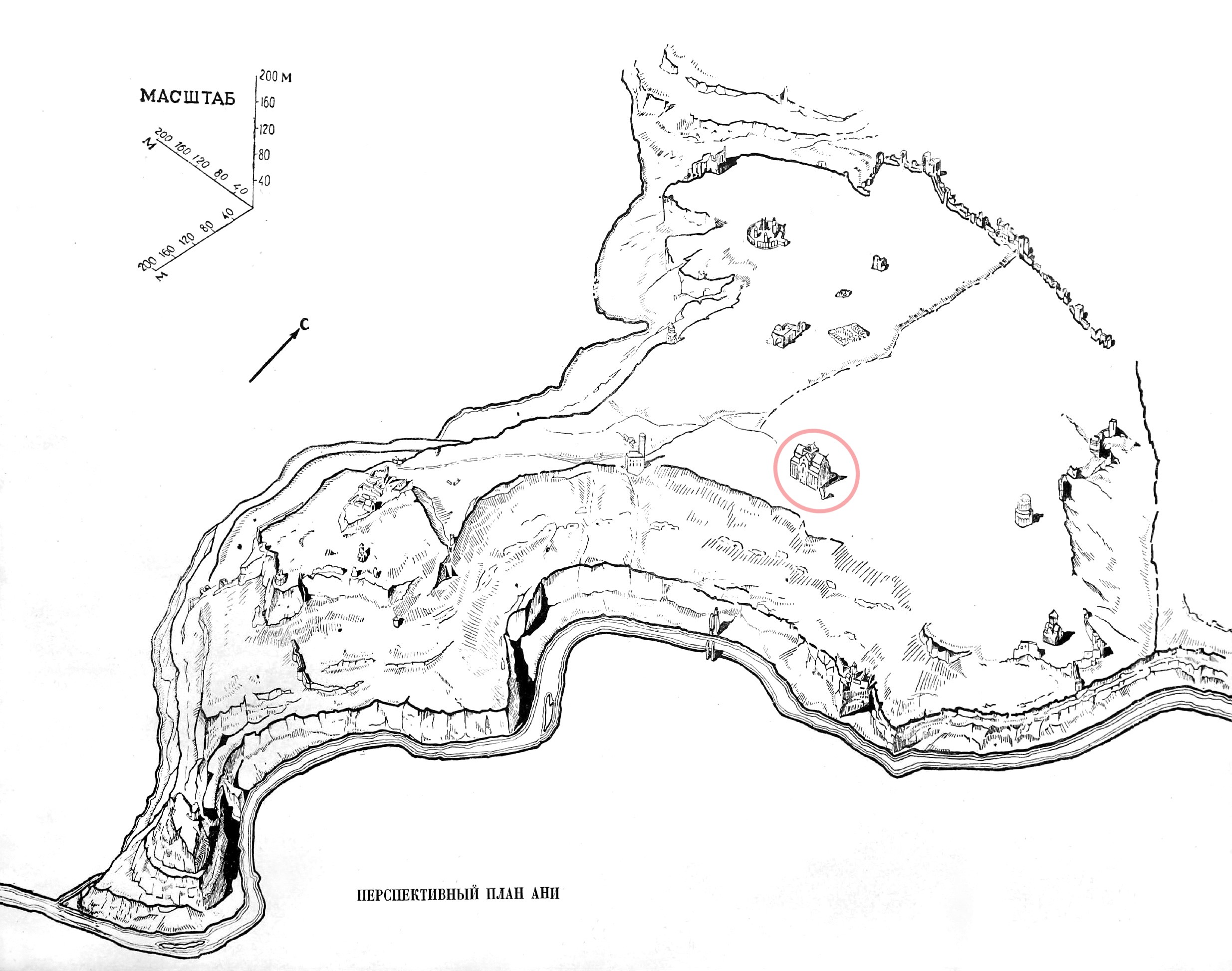
- The cathedral in 2009 The cathedral displayed in a red circle within Ani

- Location within Turkey Location within Armenia

Religion
- Affiliation: Armenian Apostolic Church

Location
- Location: Ani, Kars Province, Turkey
- Coordinates: 40.506206°N 43.572969°E

Architecture
- Architect: Trdat
- Type: Domed basilica
- Style: Armenian
- Founder: Smbat II of Armenia
- Groundbreaking: 989
- Completed: 1001 or 1010

Specifications
- Length: 34.3 m (113 ft) (Note: Toros Toramanian, Tadevos Hakobyan, and Artak Ghulyan give 34.3 by 21.9 metres (113 by 72 ft). Murad Hasratyan provides 34.3 by 24.7 metres (113 by 81 ft). Tadevos Hakobyan gave its internal dimensions as 32 by 19.7 metres (105 by 65 ft).)
- Width: 21.9 m (72 ft)
- Height (max): originally: 38 m (125 ft); 24 m (79 ft) to the base of the dome
- UNESCO World Heritage Site
- Official name: Archaeological Site of Ani
- Type: Cultural
- Criteria: ii, iii, iv
- Designated: 2016 (40th session)
- Reference no.: 1518
- Region: Western Asia

The Cathedral of Ani (Armenian: Անիի մայր տաճար, Anii mayr tačar; Turkish: Ani Katedrali) is the largest standing building in Ani, the capital city of medieval Bagratid Armenia, located in present-day eastern Turkey, on the border with modern Armenia. Its construction was completed in the early 11th century by the architect Trdat and it was the seat of the Catholicos, the head of the Armenian Apostolic Church, for nearly half a century.

In 1064, following the Seljuk conquest of Ani, the cathedral was converted into a mosque. It later returned to being used as an Armenian church. It eventually suffered damage in a 1319 earthquake when its conical dome collapsed. Subsequently, Ani was gradually abandoned and the church fell into disrepair. The north-western corner of the church was heavily damaged by a 1988 earthquake.

The cathedral is considered the largest and most impressive structure in Ani. It is a domed basilica with a rectangular plan, though the dome and most of its supporting drum are now missing. Its use of pointed arches and cluster piers has been widely cited by scholars to have possibly influenced, or at least preceded, Gothic architecture. The cathedral, along with the entire site of Ani, was declared a World Heritage Site by the UNESCO in 2016.

== Names ==
In modern Armenian, the cathedral is usually referred to as Անիի մայր տաճար, Anii mayr tačar and in Turkish as Ani Katedrali, both meaning "cathedral of Ani". Historically, however, it was known in Armenian as Անիի Կաթողիկե, Anii Kat'oghike. (Note: Kat'oghike is a term used for several major cathedrals, such as Etchmiadzin Cathedral, Armenia's mother church. Malachia Ormanian defined "katoghike" as "cathedral" and wrote that the word was used particularly for Etchmiadzin. In modern Armenian, "katoghike" is also used to refer to the Catholic Church. It is derived from the Ancient Greek word καθολικός katholikos, which means "universal". The cathedral has been so called as a description of the "universality" of the Church.) The cathedral is also known as Holy Mother of God Church of Ani (Armenian: Անիի Սուրբ Աստվածածնի եկեղեցի, Anii Surb Astvatsatsni yekeghetsi; Turkish: Meryem Ana Katedral) and the Great/Grand Cathedral of Ani (Մեծ Կաթողիկե, Mets Kat'oghike; Büyük Katedral).

== History ==
=== Foundation and early history ===
Following more than two centuries of Arab rule, Armenia gained independence under the Bagratid (Bagratuni) dynasty around 885. King Ashot III made Ani capital in 961, after which the city emerged as a prosperous urban center with 100,000 residents at its height. The construction of the cathedral began in 989. The architect Trdat was commissioned by Bagratid King Smbat II to build a cathedral in the new capital of the Armenian kingdom. The construction was halted when Smbat died in 989, according to an inscription on the south wall. Meanwhile, Trdat was hired to direct the repairs of the dome of the Hagia Sophia in Constantinople, which had collapsed in an earthquake. Trdat returned from Constantinople in 993. The construction was continued and completed by Queen Katranide (Katramide), the wife of King Gagik I, Smbat's brother and successor. It was completed either in 1001 or 1010. (Note: 1001 or 1010) According to Christina Maranci the generally accepted date of completion is 1001, but it may have extended until 1010. The contradiction is based on the reading of the inscription of the cathedral's northern wall. The cathedral served as the seat of the catholicos, the head of the Armenian Apostolic Church from its foundation in 1001 until the mid-11th century (1046 or 1051). Thus, for around half a century Ani was both the religious and secular (political) center of Armenia.

A silver cross originally stood on its conical dome and a crystal chandelier, bought by King Smbat II from India, hang in the cathedral. In the 1010s, during the reign of Catholicos Sarkis I, a mausoleum dedicated to the Hripsimean virgins was erected next to the cathedral. The mausoleum was built on some of the remnants of the virgins brought from Vagharshapat (Etchmiadzin). In the 1040s–1050s inscriptions were left on the cathedral's eastern and western walls about urban projects, such as restoration of defensive walls, installation of water pipes and easing of the tax burden on the residents of Ani.

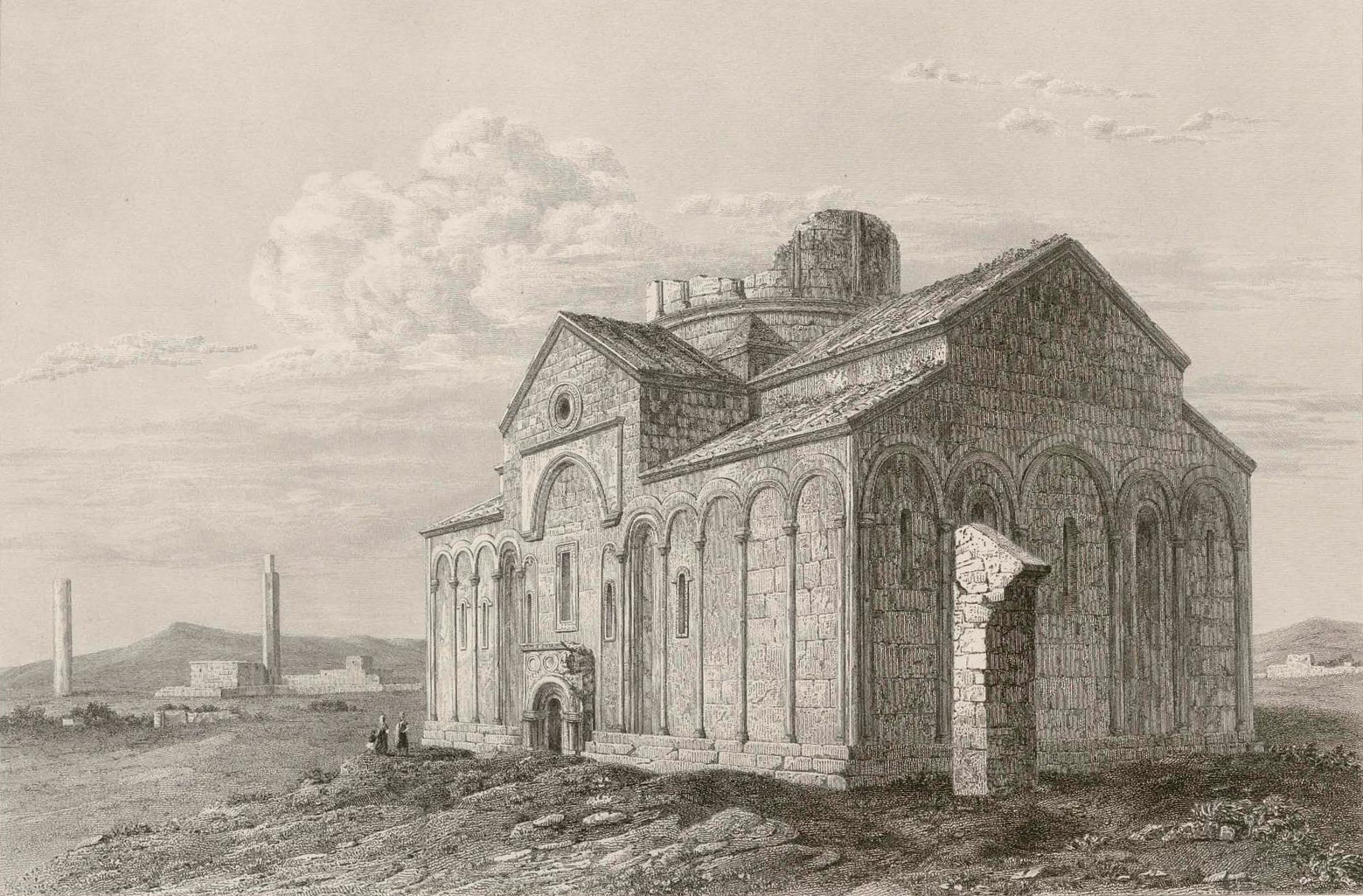
Charles Texier (1842)

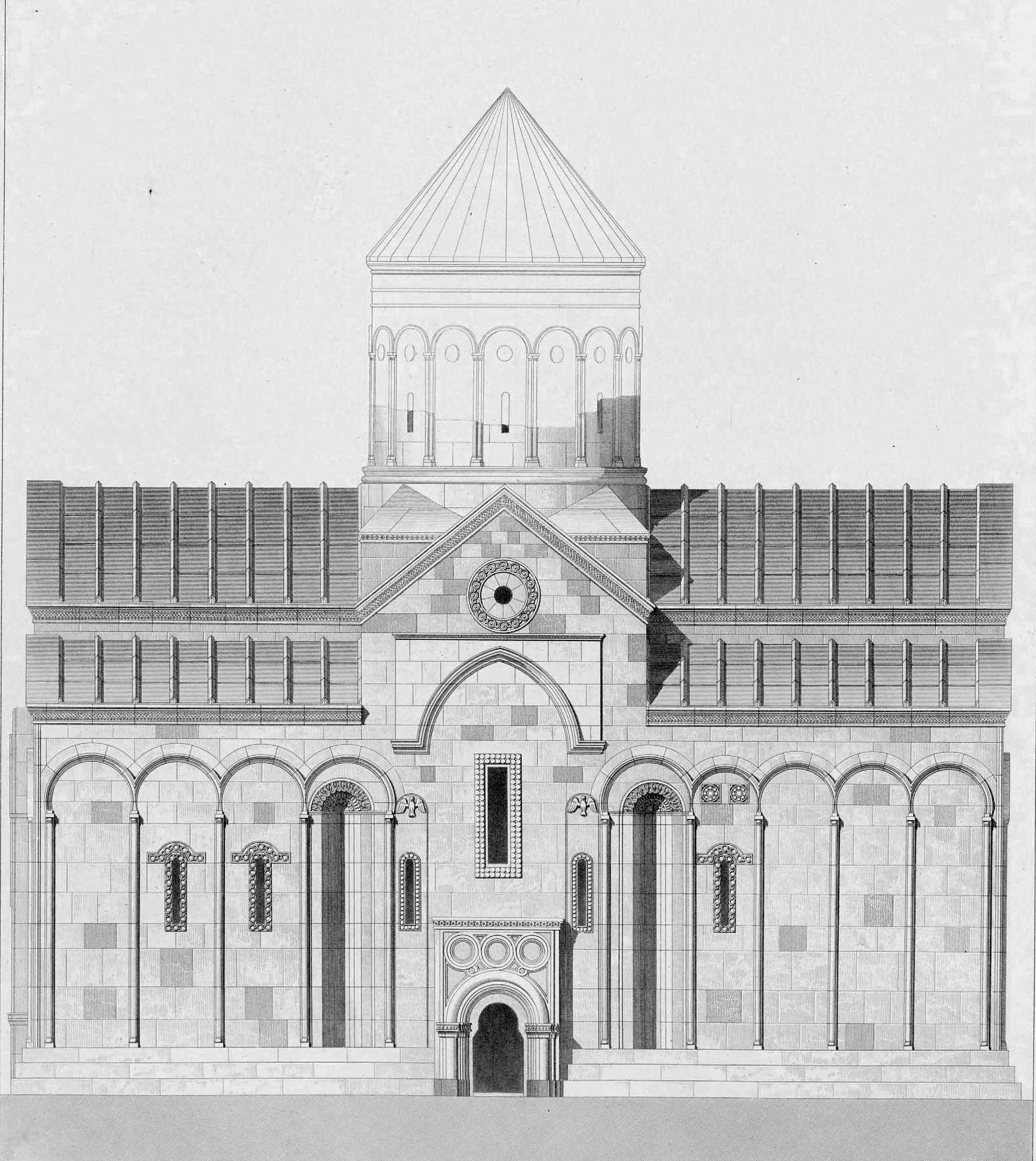
Reconstruction by Texier (1842)

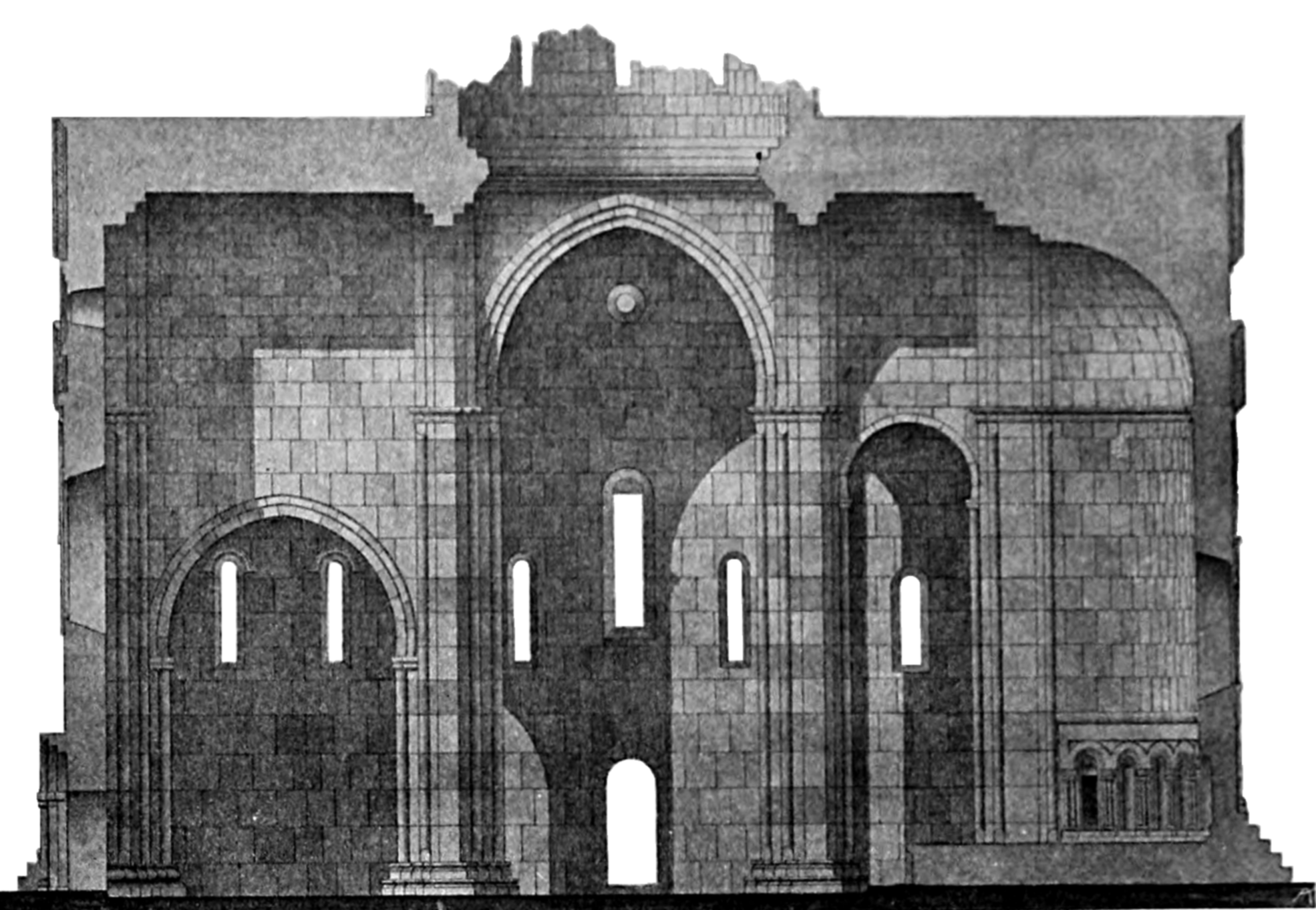
Cross section of the church per Toros Toramanian

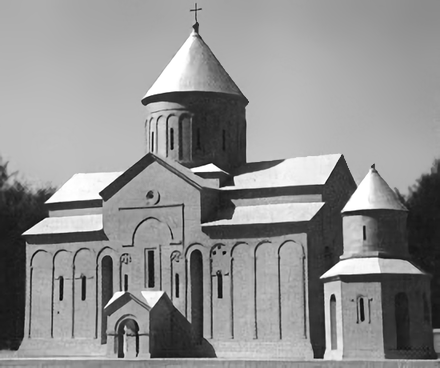
Reconstruction by Toramanian (Note: The smaller structure on the right is the mausoleum dedicated to the Hripsimean virgins.)

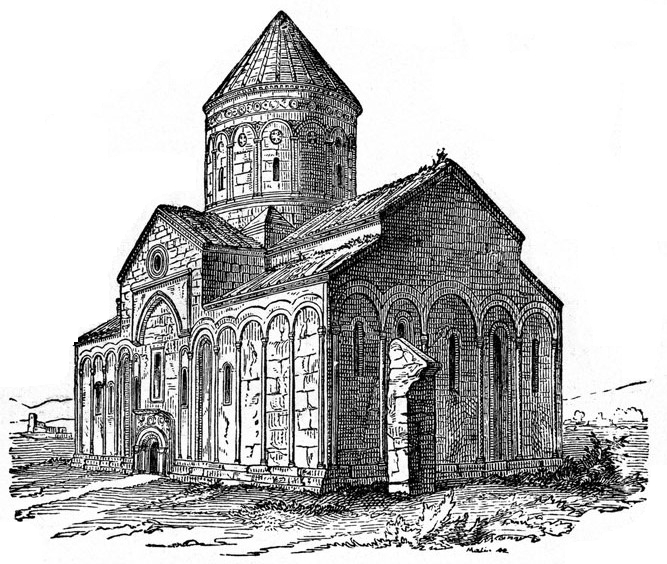
Reconstruction by Wilhelm Lübke (1881)

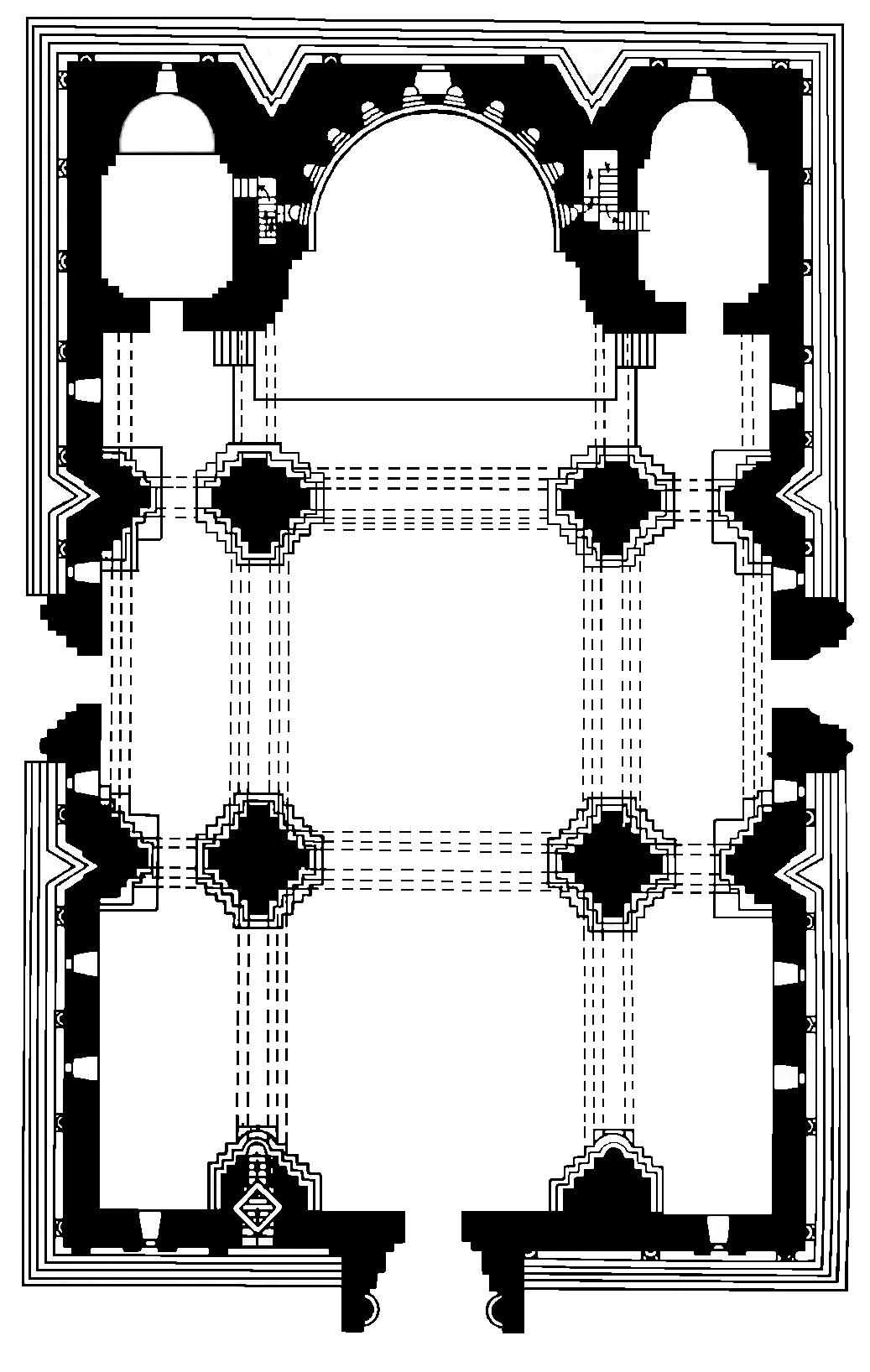
ground plan

=== Later history ===
Ani surrendered to the Byzantine Empire in 1045, who held it until 1064, when the city was captured by the Seljuks, led by Sultan Alp Arslan. According to Turkish sources, Alp Arslan and his soldiers performed their first prayer in Ani at the cathedral. Consequently, the cathedral was converted into a mosque, known as Fethiye Mosque (Turkish: Fethiye Camii). (Note: Fethiye Camii is variously translated as "victory mosque", "conquer mosque", or "conquest mosque".) Official Turkish sources often refer to it by that name. According to Matthew of Edessa, its silver cross was removed by the Seljuks and transferred to a mosque in Nakhchivan, where it was placed under the threshold, destined to be trodden upon. A crescent was placed on its dome according to Vardan Areveltsi.

In 1124 a crescent was placed on the cathedral's dome by the Shaddadid amir of Ani. In response, Ani's Armenians appealed to King David IV of Georgia to capture Ani, after which the cathedral returned to Christian usage. Vardan Areveltsi celebrated the brief reversal. Only two years later, in 1126, Ani came under the control of the Shaddadids. During the 12th century historians Mkhitar Anetsi, Samuel Anetsi and philosopher Hovhannes Sarkavag served at the cathedral in various capacities. Mkhitar was an elder priest at the cathedral in the second half of the century. In 1198 Ani was conquered by the Armenian Zakarids princes, under whose control the cathedral prospered. In 1213 the wealthy merchant Tigran Honents restored the cathedral's steps.

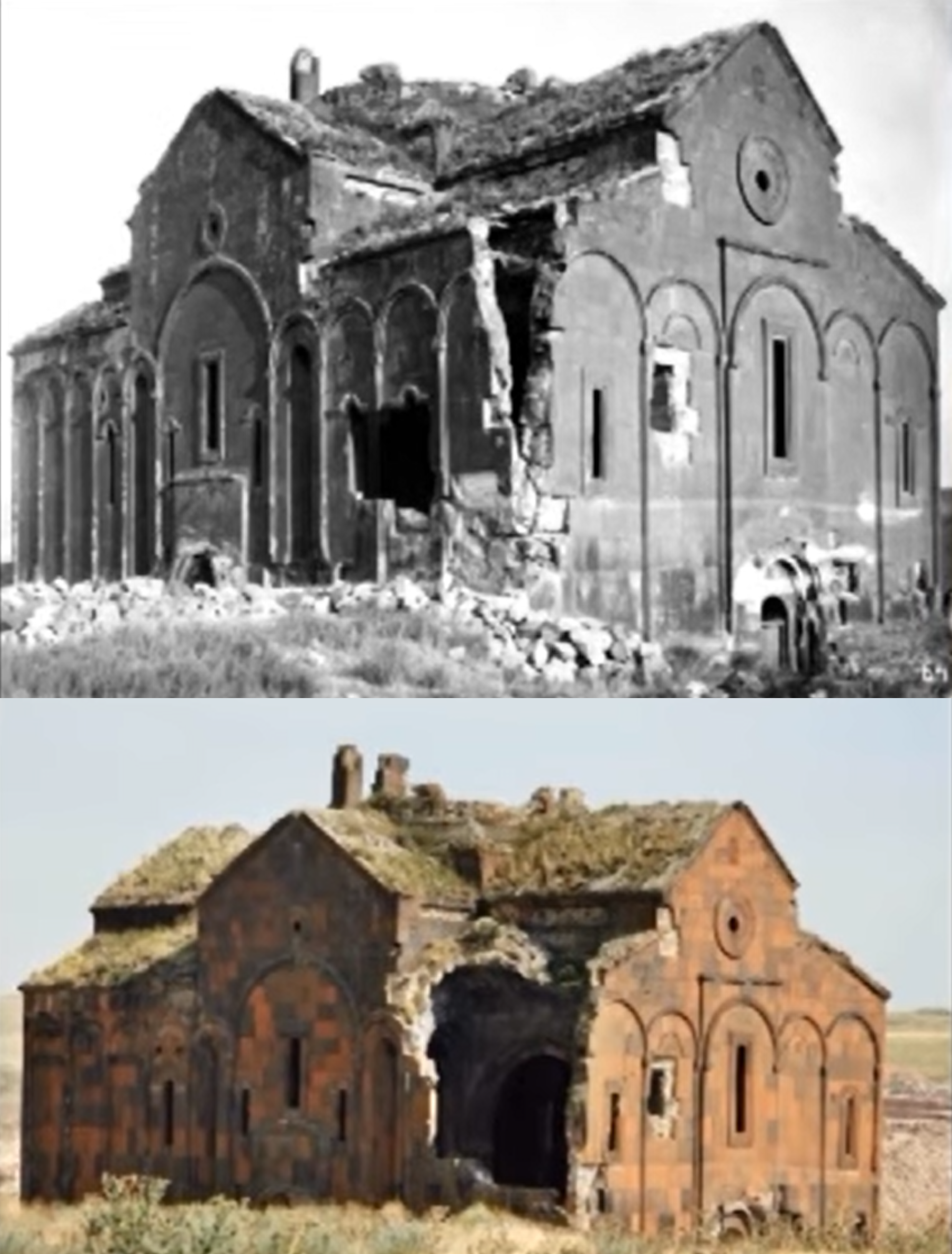
Damage caused by the 1988 earthquake.

=== Decay ===
Ani's long-term decline began in 1239 when Mongols sacked the city and massacred its population. In 1319 a devastating earthquake struck Ani. It resulted in the collapse of the cathedral's conical roof. Ani was completely deserted by the 18th century. The drum reportedly collapsed during an 1832 or 1840 earthquake. Varazdat Harutyunyan insists that the entire dome had collapsed in 1319.

The north-western corner of the cathedral was heavily damaged by a 1988 earthquake with its epicenter in modern Armenia's north. It resulted in a large gaping hole. According to VirtualAni it also caused "a serious rent in the south-west corner; by 1998 parts of the roof here had started to fall." Lavrenti Barseghian wrote in 2003 that the damage from the earthquake was so great that the entire building would collapse unless strengthened and restored.

Explosions in a quarry on the Armenian side of the border, across the Akhurian River, reportedly caused some damage to the cathedral in the early 2000s. In mid-June 2001 an "ear-splitting explosion rocked the site just as a group of Armenian Americans had gathered to pray at the cathedral." Samvel Karapetyan, who witnessed the explosions on the Armenian side during his visit to Ani in July 2000, stated that the explosions continued until 2004/2005. However, Turkish accusations continued until 2008. Vercihan Ziflioğlu wrote for Hürriyet that it was only in 2009 that Armenia halted blasting activities, reportedly, after Turkey's complaint at the International Council on Monuments and Sites (ICOMOS).

In the mid-2000s, Turkish guards had dug a large hole in their quest for treasure on the floor of the apse of the cathedral. Moreover, treasure hunters dug out the grave of what may have been that of Queen Katranide beside the west façade of the cathedral. It had been uncovered by French archaeologists in 2002–03. Additional gravestones with Armenian inscriptions nearby were upturned.

== Preservation efforts ==
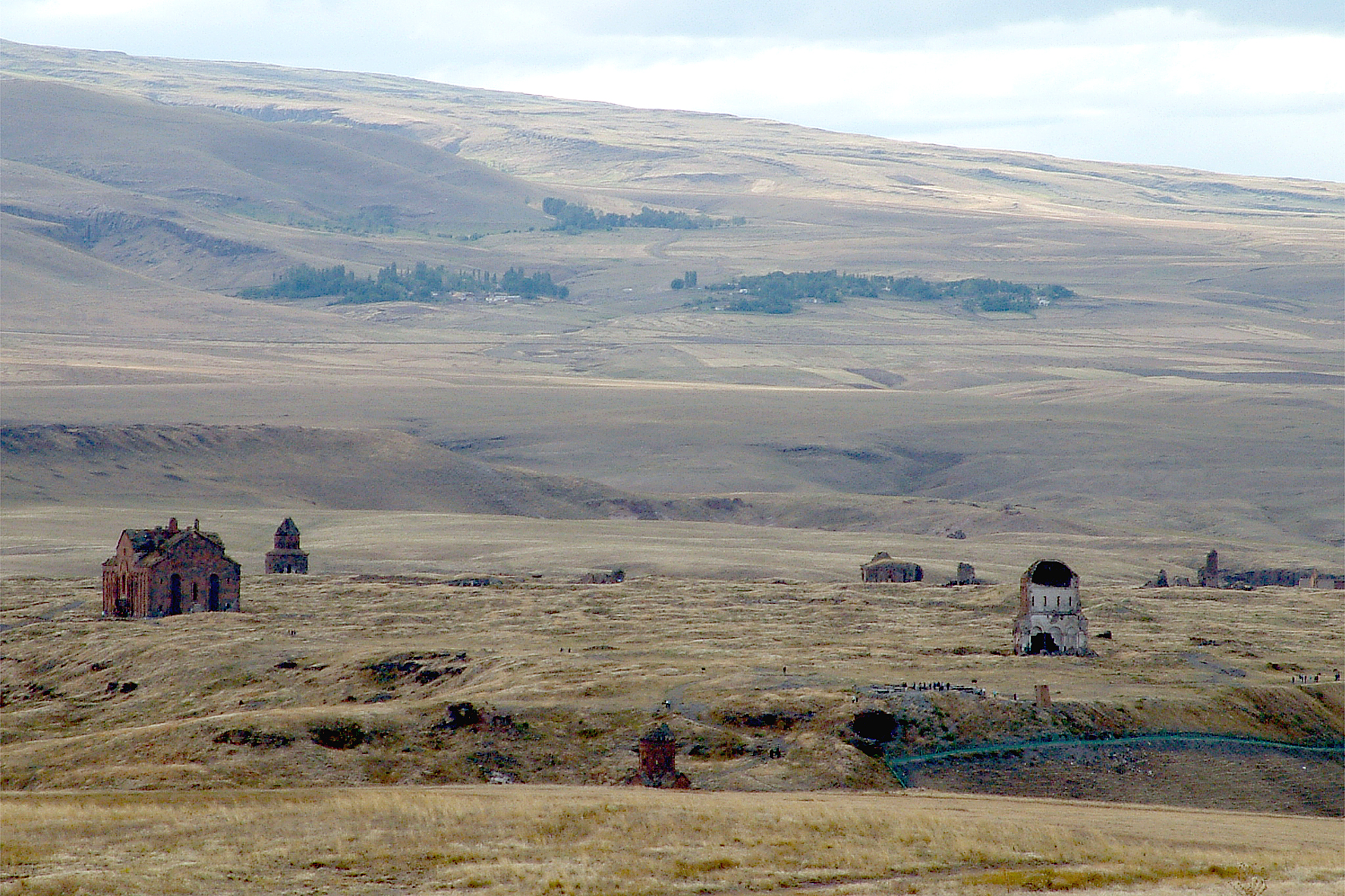
View of Ani from Armenia. The cathedral is seen near the left edge, while the Church of the Redeemer on the right side.

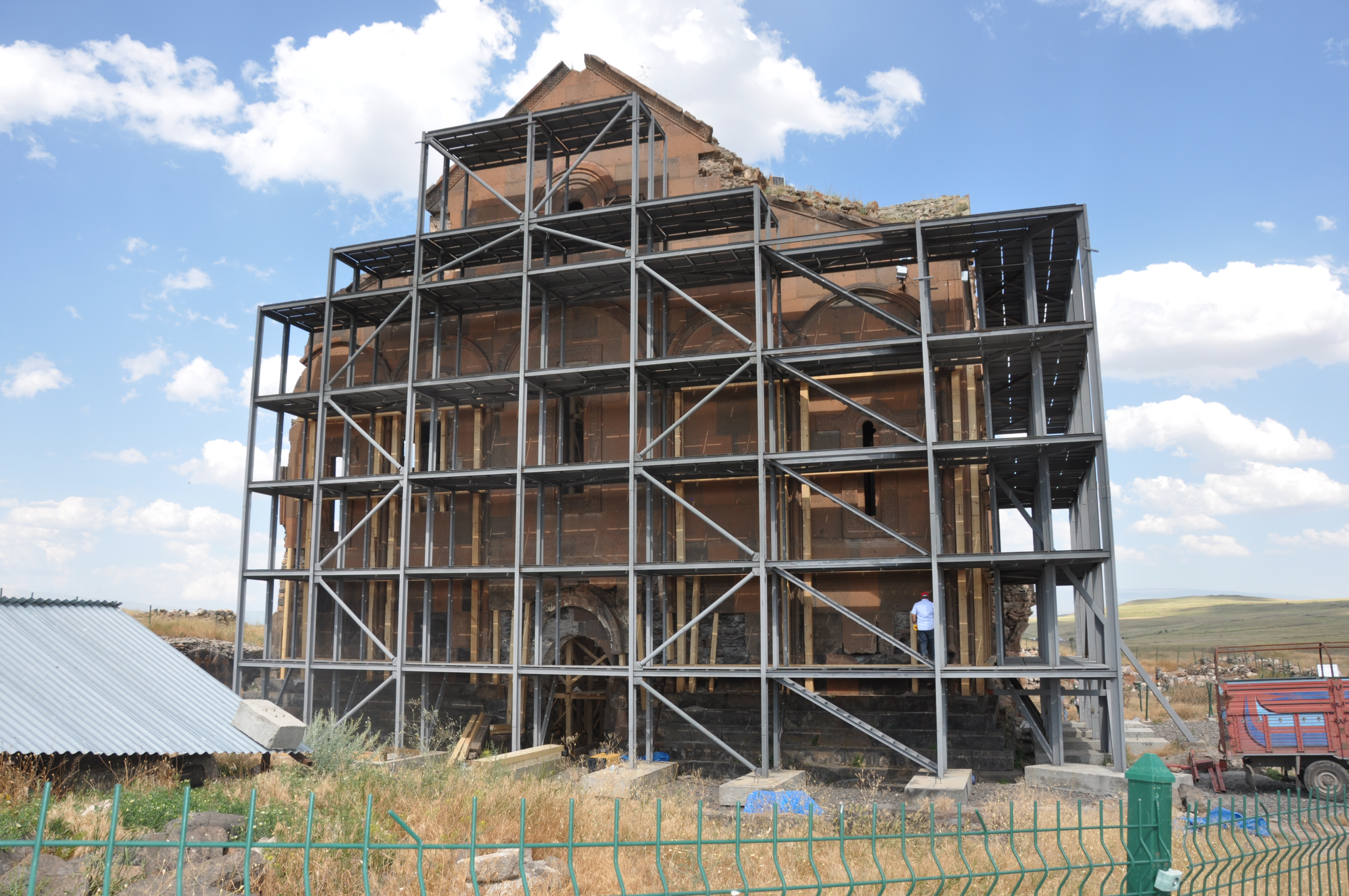
The cathedral undergoing restoration in 2018

Ani has been listed on the World Monuments Watch by World Monuments Fund (WMF) since 1996. In May 2011 the WMF and the Turkish Ministry of Culture launched a conservation project focusing on the cathedral and the nearby Church of the Redeemer. The project is funded by the Ambassadors Fund for Cultural Preservation of the U.S. State Department. Before the project, a steel structure was installed around the cathedral, in order to prevent its cracked sandstone walls from collapsing. The WMF and its Turkish partner, Anadolu Kültür, said they will work on "stabilization and protection" of the cathedral. Turkey's Minister of Culture Ertuğrul Günay stated "We hope that giving new life to the remains of once-splendid buildings, such as the Ani Cathedral and church, will bring new economic opportunities to the region." Armenian officials responded with skepticism.

According to Gagik Gyurjyan, president of ICOMOS-Armenia, the Turkish Culture Ministry rejected the preliminary agreement between Anadolu Kültür and the Armenian side to engage Armenian experts in restoration works. Osman Kavala, president of Anadolu Kültür, stated that the lack of formal bilateral relations between Armenia and Turkey may have prevented Armenian experts from being included in the project. Kavala stated in a 2011 interview that an estimated $1 million would be spent on the project, which was scheduled to start in 2012 and end in 4 years. Yavuz Özkaya, an architect who participated in the projects carried out in Ani, stated in March 2014 that studies on preservation and restoration of the cathedral were completed and they had begun to be implemented. These works included clearing the roofs, installing a temporary structure at the separation point between the western and southern walls, strengthening, proper completion of roof tiles and taking preventative measures.

The archaeological site of Ani was inscribed as a UNESCO World Heritage Site on July 15, 2016. According to art historian Heghnar Zeitlian Watenpaugh the addition "would secure significant benefits in protection, research expertise, and funding." In April 2018 Necmettin Alp, director of the Kars Museum, stated that restoration works on the cathedral would start later that month. In 2019 World Monuments Fund (WMF) and Anadolu Kültür began an "emergency temporary intervention" for the preservation of the cathedral. In 2021 WMF, with the support of the International alliance for the protection of heritage in conflict areas (ALIPH Foundation), began a second phase "focusing on the implementation of a long-term intervention plan for the restoration of the entire cathedral."

In June 2025, an Anadolu Agency report on the cathedral's restoration repeatedly referred to the structure as a "mosque," prompting several Armenian media outlets to report that the cathedral was being converted into a mosque. This led George Aslan, a DEM Party MP, to formally question Turkish Culture Minister Mehmet Ersoy about these reports. CivilNet reported from Ani that there is "no indication" that it is being converted.

== Architecture ==
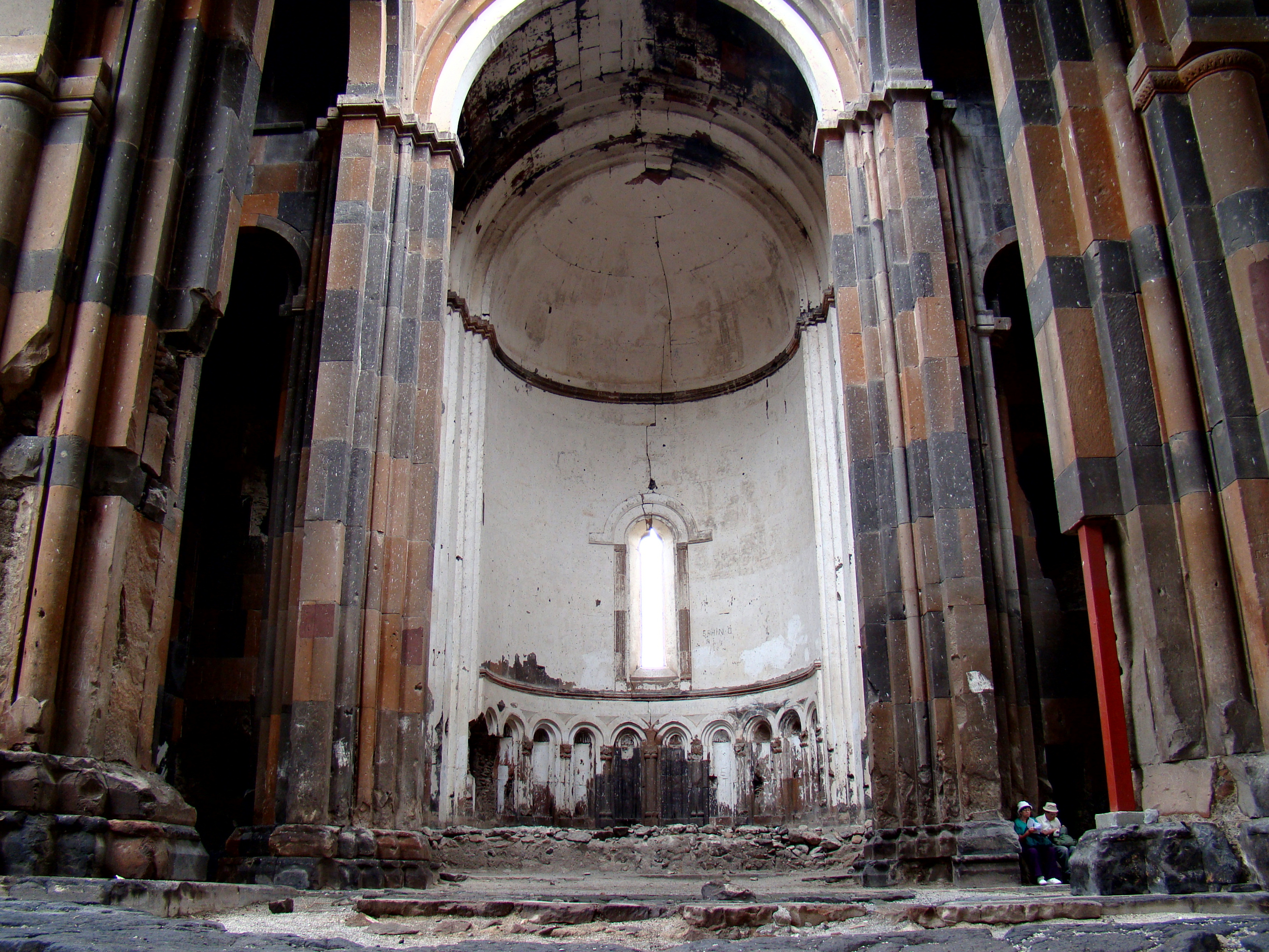
The interior of the cathedral. (For a sense of its scale, note the two people sitting on the bottom right of the image.)

=== Overview and dimensions ===
The cathedral is a domed, centrally-planned basilica. (Note: "a fusion between basilica and central plan" "In its form, the Cathedral is a centrally-planned basilica."; "Christina Maranci has analyzed the ways in which the cathedral at Ani innovates the domed basilica type ..." "..domed basilicas like the Ani Cathedral ...") Its plan and design derive from seventh century basilicas (Mren, Gayane, Odzun, Bagavan), but significantly expands the central nave and pronounces verticality of the interior. The dome was supported on pendentives and stood atop the "intersection of four barrel vaults elevated to a cruciform design and topped with gabled roofs." In the interior, "freestanding piers divide the space into three aisles, the nave of which terminates in an eastern apse flanked by two story side chapels." Sirarpie Der Nersessian noted that its interior is imposing "through the harmony of the proportions." She added, "The blind arcade with slender columns and ornate arches, the delicate interlaces carved around the door and windows add to the beauty of the exterior."

The cathedral is 34.3 m (113 ft) long and 21.9 m (72 ft) wide. Originally standing around 38 m (125 ft) high, (Note: 24 m (79 ft) high to the base of its dome) it was Ani's tallest structure, and its conical dome dominated the city's skyline. It is very large by the standards of Armenian architecture. Murad Hasratyan argues that its large size and rich ornaments symbolize the revived Armenian statehood under the Bagratids. Christina Maranci suggested what she describes as an "extremely tentative" hypothesis that the relatively large proportion of the cathedral may have reflected architect Trdat's memory of the "vast continuous spaces" of Hagia Sophia in Constantinople, the dome of which he had repaired. Western visitors often found it small, with Karl Schnaase disparagingly describing it as "hardly the size of a village church". H. F. B. Lynch argued that it is small if judged by European standards, but is "nevertheless a stately building."

The cathedral is built, primarily, of yellow, but also black and red polished tuff. It has three entrances. The main one is on the western side. The entrances on the northern and southern sides, though secondary, are richly decorated. Its windows are narrow and long, with ornamented frames. Grigoris Balakian opined that its interior, built of large polished stones, "appears to be more impressive than the outside." Luigi Villari suggested that from a distance it appears as "a plain rectangular structure with no architectural pretensions", but a closer inspection reveals "a building of really great beauty and of the most perfect proportions."

=== Scholarly reception ===
The cathedral is widely regarded as a masterpiece of Armenian architecture. (Note: "indisputably one of the masterpieces of Armenian architecture" "a masterpiece of Armenian medieval architecture" "հայ ճարտարապետության գլուխգործոցներից մեկը" «Այն իրավացիորեն համարվում է հայկական ճարտարապետության մեծագործություններից մեկը») It is the largest and most impressive structure of Ani. Armen Kazaryan describes it as the most significant structure of the entire Bagratid period. Recognized for its innovative design elements, it has garnered praise from scholars. The authors of Global History of Architecture (2010) wrote that it "deserves to be listed among the principal monuments of the time because of its pointed arches and clustered columns and piers." Similarly, Sirarpie Der Nersessian argued that it "deserves to be listed among the important examples of medieval architecture", while David Roden Buxton suggested that it "is worthy ... of far greater renown that actually surrounds it."

Josef Strzygowski argued that the cathedral is the most valuable achievement of Armenian architecture from the European viewpoint. H. F. B. Lynch described it as a "monument of the highest artistic merit, denoting a standard of culture which was far in advance of the contemporary standards in the West." Similarly, David Marshall Lang wrote that the cathedral's building techniques are "far ahead of the contemporary Anglo-Saxon and Norman architecture of western Europe."

=== Imitations in Armenian architecture ===
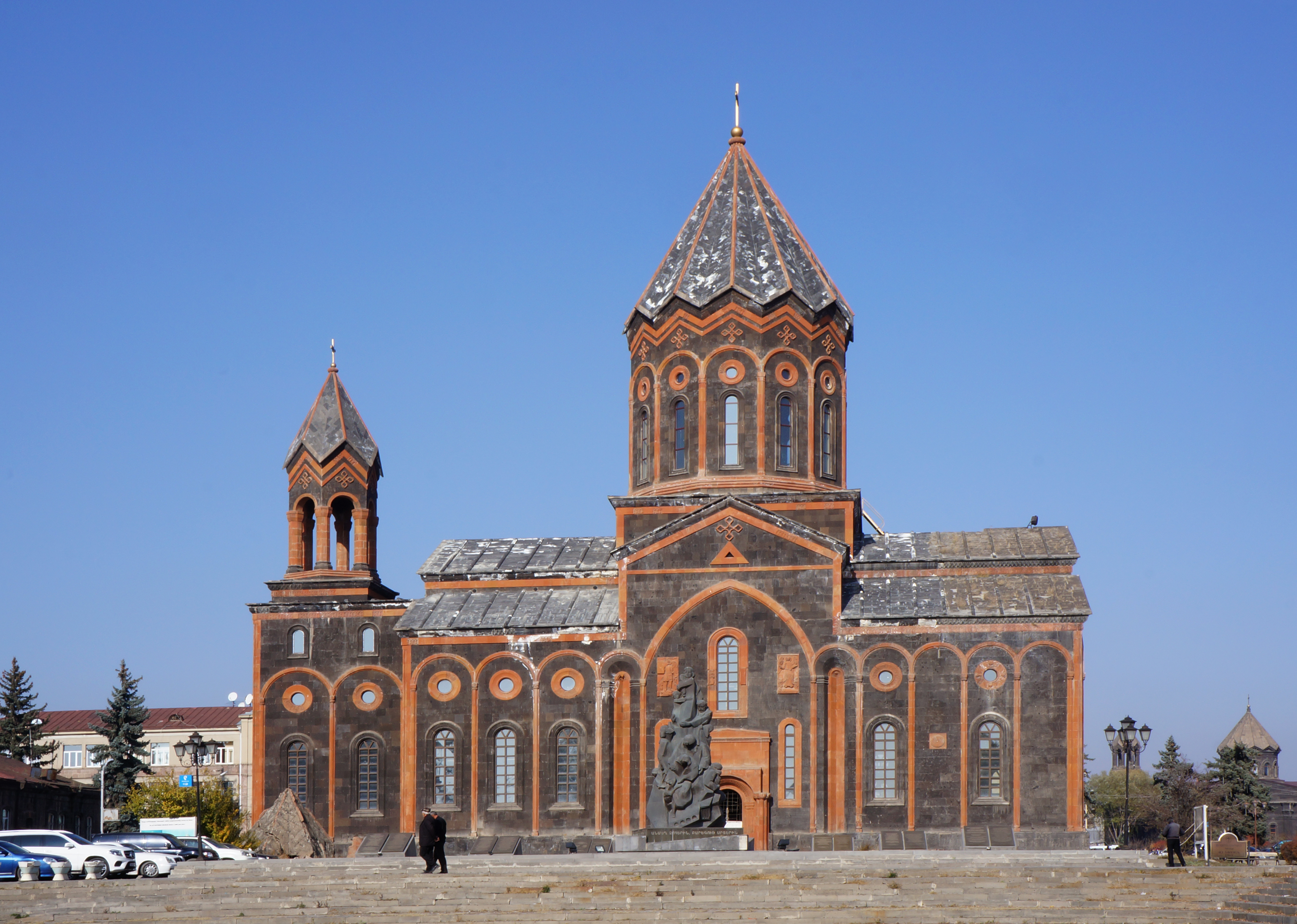
Holy Saviour's Church in Gyumri, completed in 1873, is an imitation of the cathedral of Ani

The main church of Marmashen monastery (dated 988–1029), believed to have been built by the same architect, Trdat, is considered a miniature of Ani Cathedral. Richard Krautheimer wrote that the exterior walls of both the church of Marmashen and the cathedral of Ani are "articulated by blind arcades resting on slender colonnettes, single or in pairs." There are significant structural differences between the two. Stepan Mnatsakanian noted that the similarities are limited to the exterior decorations because there are significant differences in their floor plans.

The ground plan of Holy Saviour's Church in Gyumri, completed in 1873, is based on that of Ani Cathedral. However, the church is significantly larger than the cathedral and is not an exact replica of the latter. The blind arcades on the three apses of the Armenian Cathedral of Lviv—added sometime before 1902—are a "surprisingly faithful reproduction of an analogous decoration" on the external walls of cathedral of Ani. Sourp Nshan Cathedral in Beirut, Lebanon, completed in 1938, was modeled after the cathedral of Ani.

=== Association with Gothic architecture ===
Some European scholars, especially scholars of the Near East, have suggested that the use of pointed arches and clustered piers in the cathedral influenced the development of Gothic architecture. The theory was popularized by Josef Strzygowski, who was the first European to thoroughly study Armenian architecture and placed Armenia in the center of European architecture. Strzygowski wrote in the Origin of Christian Church Art (1920): "It is a delight, in a church earlier than AD 1000, to see the builder, the court architect Trdat, carrying Armenian art so logically and so successfully past 'Romanesque' to 'Gothic'." Several others had proposed this view before him, including H. F. B. Lynch (1901), William Lethaby (1912), and others. Lynch suggested that the cathedral has "many of the characteristics of the Gothic style, of which it establishes the Oriental origin." Lethaby found the cathedral "strangely western." In the Encyclopædia Britannica (1911), Richard Phené Spiers wrote that it displays pointed arches and coupled piers that would not appear in Italian and Sicilian churches until the 12th or 14th centuries. He further saw a similarity in its lofty blind arcades and those in the Pisa Cathedral.

In examining the possible influence of Caucasian architecture in the West, David Roden Buxton wrote on the cathedral of Ani in 1934:

... inside it bears the semblance of a Gothic cathedral such as Western Europe might have seen two centuries later. Pairs of clustered columns support a high pointed vault, and on either side is an aisle with narrow pointed arches like those of the "Early English" style. It is assuredly a striking example of parallel evolution, even if all idea of a connection with the Gothic must be dismissed.

Arthur Upham Pope suggested that the Ani Cathedral "antedate[s] any comparable construction in Europe" and argued that its interior is "so completely in the Gothic manner and mood that the relation between Ani and the French Gothic lacks but little of proof." Cecil Stewart noted that the most interesting features of the cathedral are its "pointed arches and vaults and the clustering or coupling of the columns in the Gothic manner." For David Talbot Rice the cathedral is "astonishingly Gothic in every detail." David Marshall Lang argued that the appearance of pointed arches and clustered piers together is "considered one of the hallmarks of mature Gothic architecture." Christina Maranci argues that the cathedral, with it "profiled piers and arches ... anticipate, in their linear elegance, the Gothic styles of buildings like Notre-Dame."

The theory has found support among Armenian architecture historians. (Note: such as Toros Toramanian, Tiran Marutian, Murad Hasratyan (Note: Եկեղեցու ներսի այդպիսի լուծումը, հատկապես մույթերի՝ ջլաղեղների նմանությամբ մասնատումը XII–XIV դդ. դարձել են Արմ. Եվրոպայում ձևավորված ու տարածված գոթական ճարտարապետության բնորոշ հատկանիշները: English: These elements, especially the flying buttress (arc-boutant) in the form of nervures were common characteristics of Gothic architecture which originated and spread in Western Europe in the 13th–14th centuries.)) The hypothesized influence on the Gothic has also been noted by World Monuments Fund and the Ambassadors Fund for Cultural Preservation. James Stevens Curl noted that the influence of Armenian architecture on Western European buildings remains "unclear", but "certainly by the early 11th century domed basilicas, such as the Ani Cathedral, "began to acquire bundle-like piers, vaulting systems, and architectural features reminiscent of Western Romanesque and Gothic forms."

==== Criticism and response ====
Art historian Sirarpie Der Nersessian rejected the postulated "proto-Gothic" character of the ogival arches of the cathedral of Ani which, she argued, "do not serve the same function in supporting the vault." Although Adrian Stokes saw the cathedral as holding "some balance between wall architecture and the linear Gothic to come," he did not find "the feeling for mass and space that transfixes him at Rimini or Luciano Laurana's Quattro Cento courtyard in the Palace of Urbino." The website Virtual Ani writes that there is "no evidence to indicate that there was a connection between Armenian architecture and the development of the Gothic style in Western Europe." Lucy Der Manuelian argues that there is a documented evidence of the presence of Armenians in Western Europe during the Middle Ages, who could have carried this information to the West.

== Politics and commemorations ==
The cathedral has been the focus of commemorative, political, and symbolic activity by both Armenian and Turkish actors.

=== Armenian commemoration ===
In 1989 a series of events commemorating the millennium of the cathedral took place in the United States, including a symposium at the New-York Historical Society. In independent Armenia, the cathedral has been commemorated with a stamp (2002) and an uncirculated silver commemorative coin (2011).

In June 2011 the graduation ceremony of history students of the Yerevan State University (YSU) was held at the cathedral. The tradition was then taken up by other YSU departments. Separately, in September 2011 researchers of the Shirak Armenology Research Center of the National Academy of Sciences of Armenia made a pilgrimage to the cathedral, where they performed scientific readings on the history of Ani. Folk dance director Gagik Ginosyan and his wife staged a wedding ceremony at the cathedral.

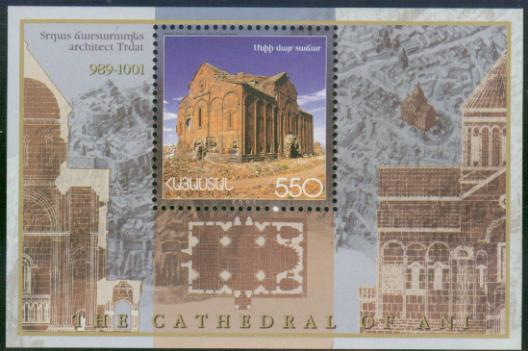
The cathedral on a 2002 Armenian stamp

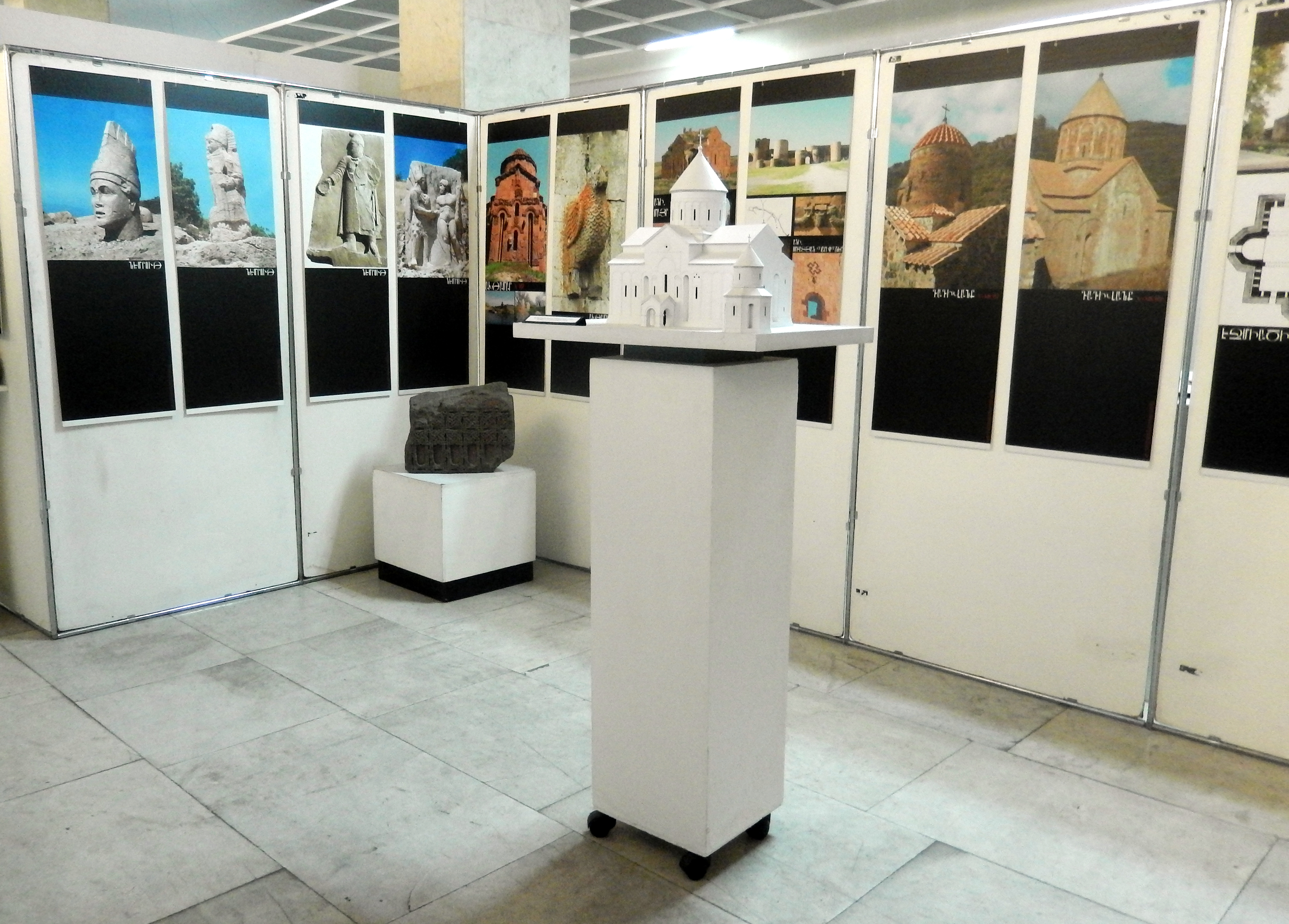
A model at Armenia’s national architecture museum

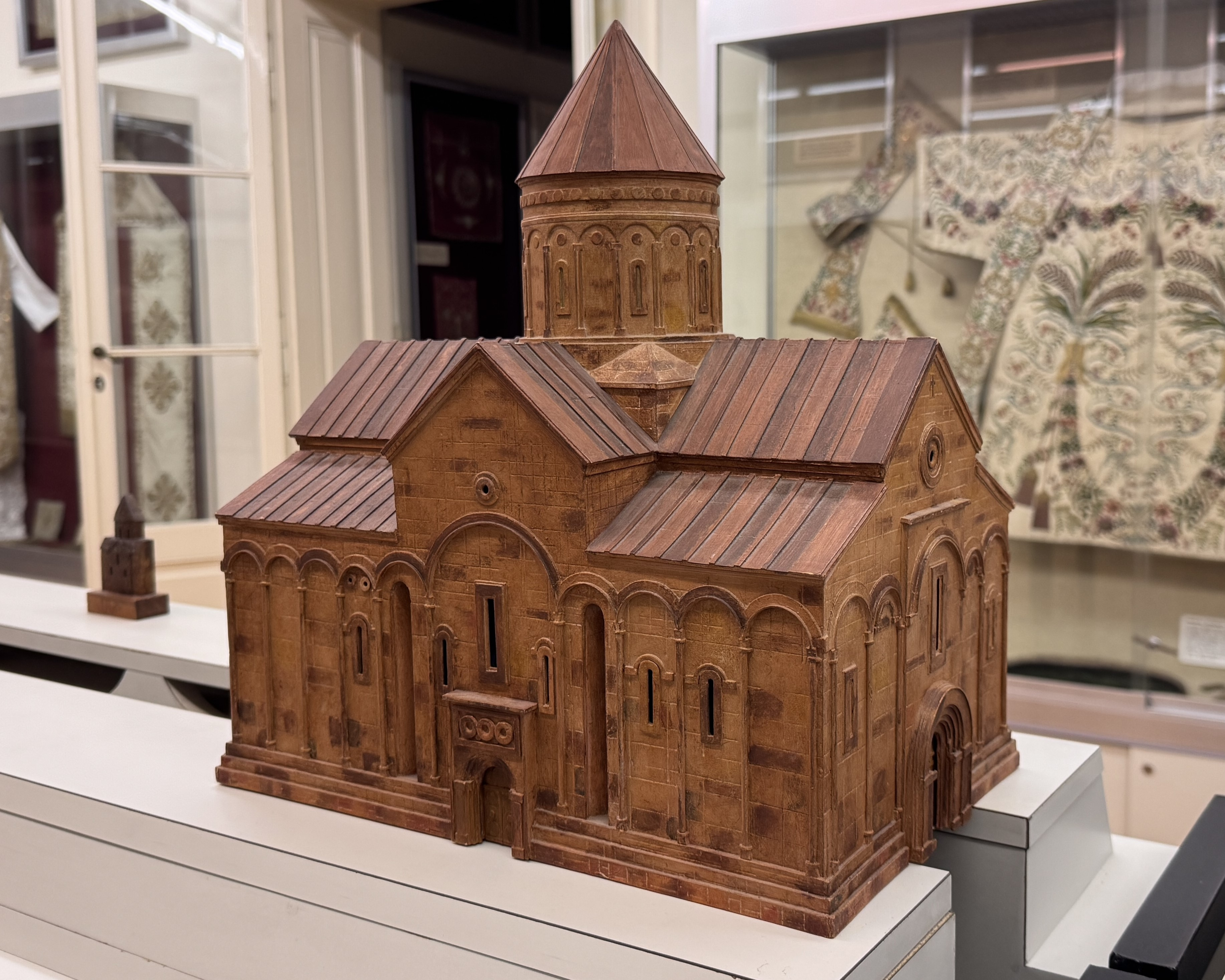
A model of the cathedral at the Mekhitarist Monastery of Vienna

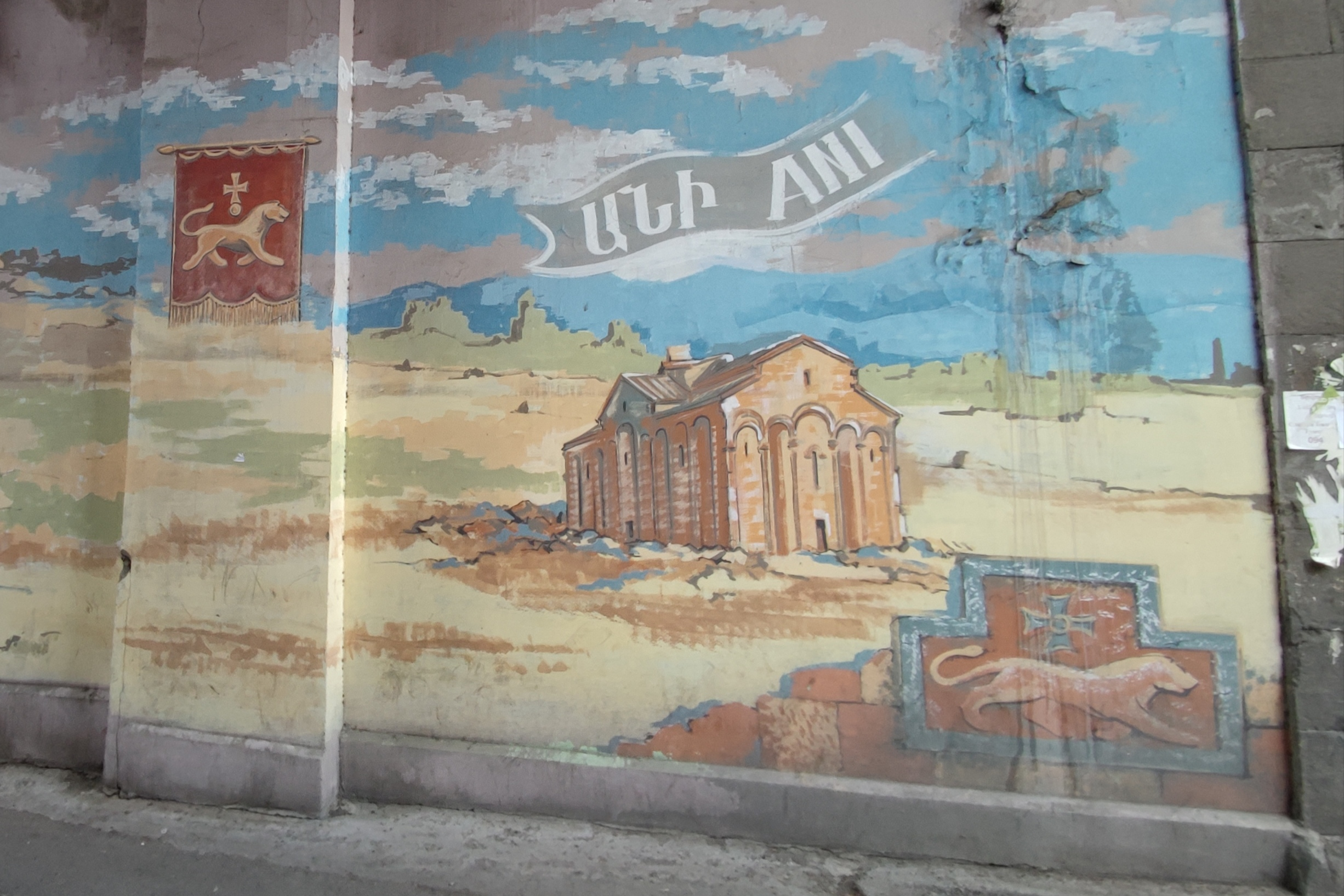
Street art in Yerevan depicting the cathedral

=== Turkish politics ===
Turkish President Abdullah Gül visited the cathedral on July 23, 2008 during his visit to Ani.

==== 2010 Muslim prayer ====
On October 1, 2010 a Muslim prayer was performed at the cathedral by members and supporters of the far-right Nationalist Movement Party (MHP). The formal occasion was to commemorate the 1064 Seljuk conquest of Ani, but it was widely seen as a nationalist retaliation for the Christian mass—the first since the Armenian Genocide of 1915—at the Cathedral of Aghtamar at Lake Van on September 19. Some two thousand people, including senior members of the MHP, such as party leader Devlet Bahçeli, participated in the prayer. The crowd waved Turkish flags and chanted Allahu Akbar before saying prayers in and around the cathedral. They were accompanied by an Ottoman-style military marching band. The prayer was authorized by the Turkish Ministry of Culture, and was attended by believers from Azerbaijan and broadcast live by three Azerbaijani TV channels.

The prayer was widely denounced for its political nature. An MP from the ruling AKP called it an illegal "political show" connected with the Aghtamar mass, while art historian Heghnar Watenpaugh described the event as an example of "political stagecraft." According to Aris Nalcı of the Turkish-Armenian daily Agos it was "addressed to Turks, rather than Armenians." Yapı Kredi Bank Economic Research, "the scene looked awkward to a large majority of Turks." Hürriyet Daily News columnist Yusuf Kanlı described it as an "attempt [by Bahçeli] to woo and win back the lost nationalist-conservative vote." Turkish-Armenian journalist Markar Esayan wrote in Taraf that what Bahçeli did at Ani was "in fact exploitation of religion."

The Armenian Apostolic Church accused the Turkish authorities in "destroying Armenian monuments and misappropriating historical Armenian holy sites and cultural treasures." Architecture scholar Samvel Karapetyan commented sarcastically that Armenians have reason to be happy because Armenian churches were long desecrated, whereas now Turks are only praying.

==== 2020 incident ====
In February 2020 a video appeared online in which a woman sang meyhane music on the bema of the cathedral while Pervin Ersoy, the wife of Mehmet Ersoy, Turkey's Minister of Culture and Tourism, was shown standing in the crowd and clapping.

== Gallery ==
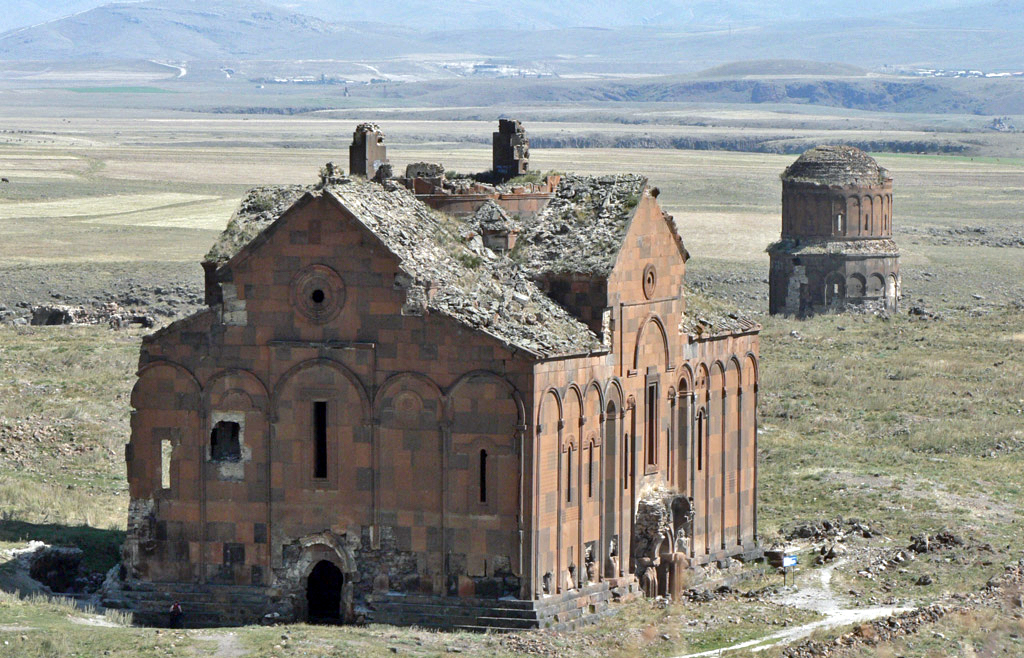
The cathedral with the Church of the Redeemer in the background

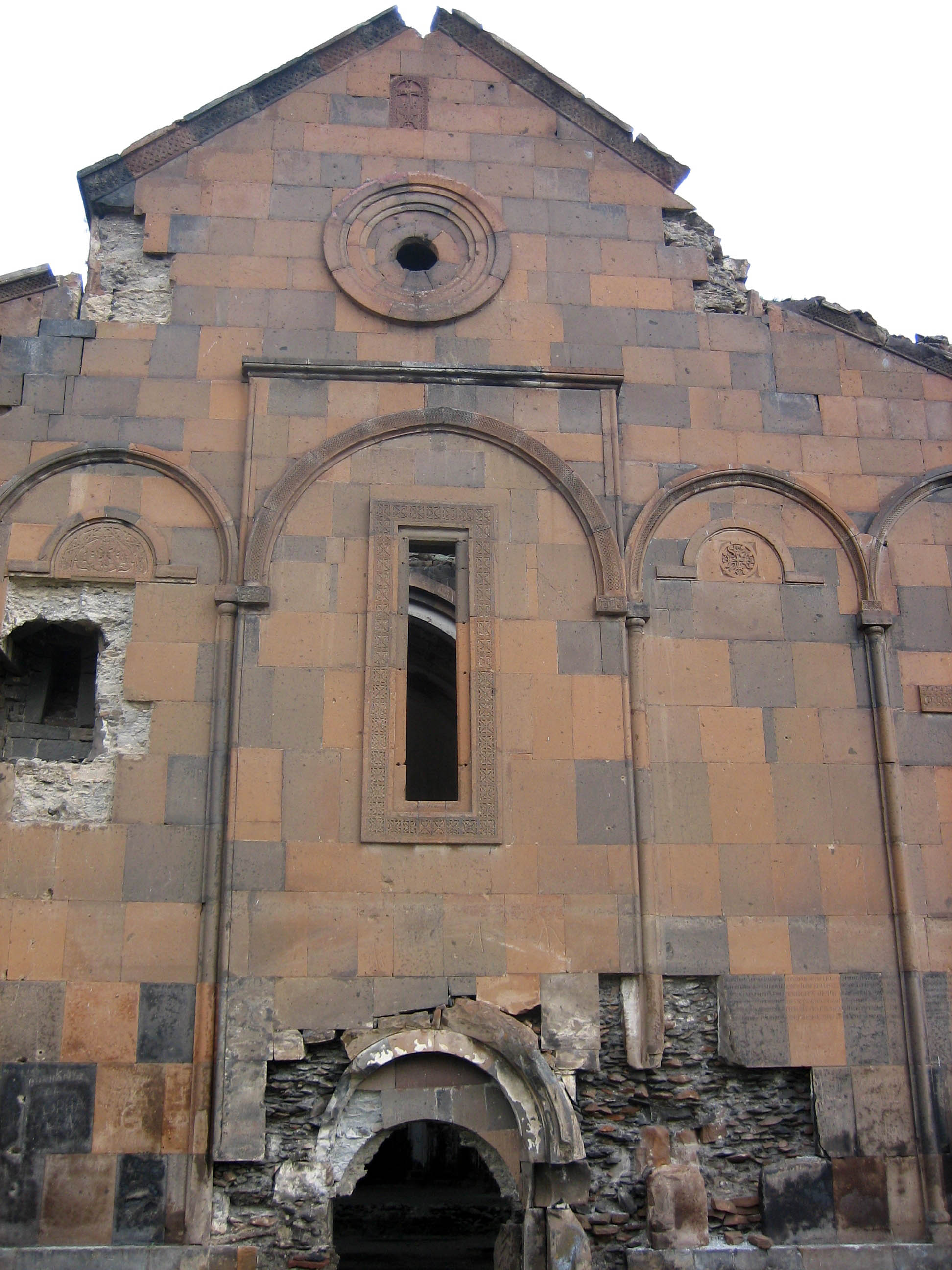
Western façade

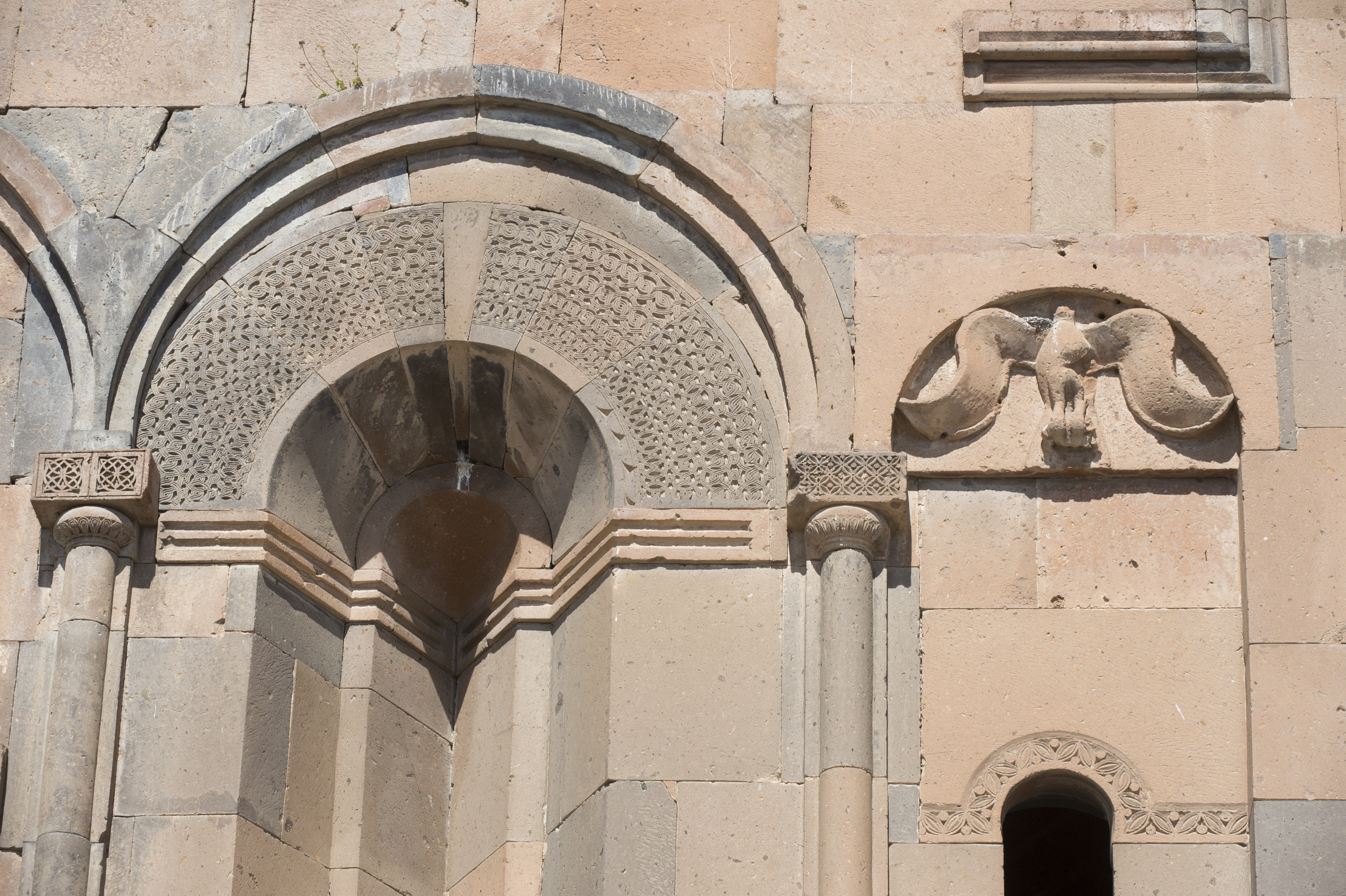
Detail on the south façade

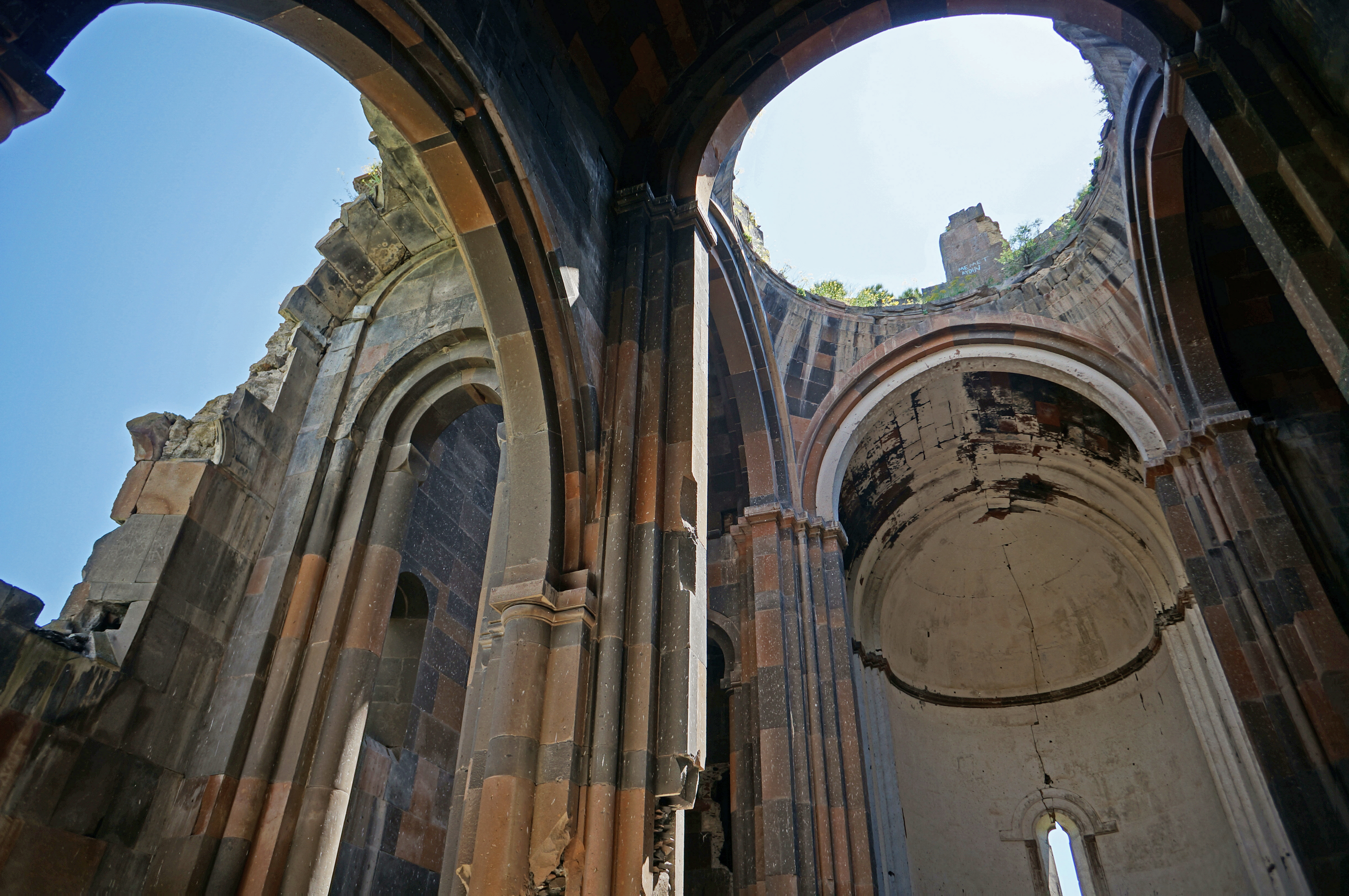
Interior view

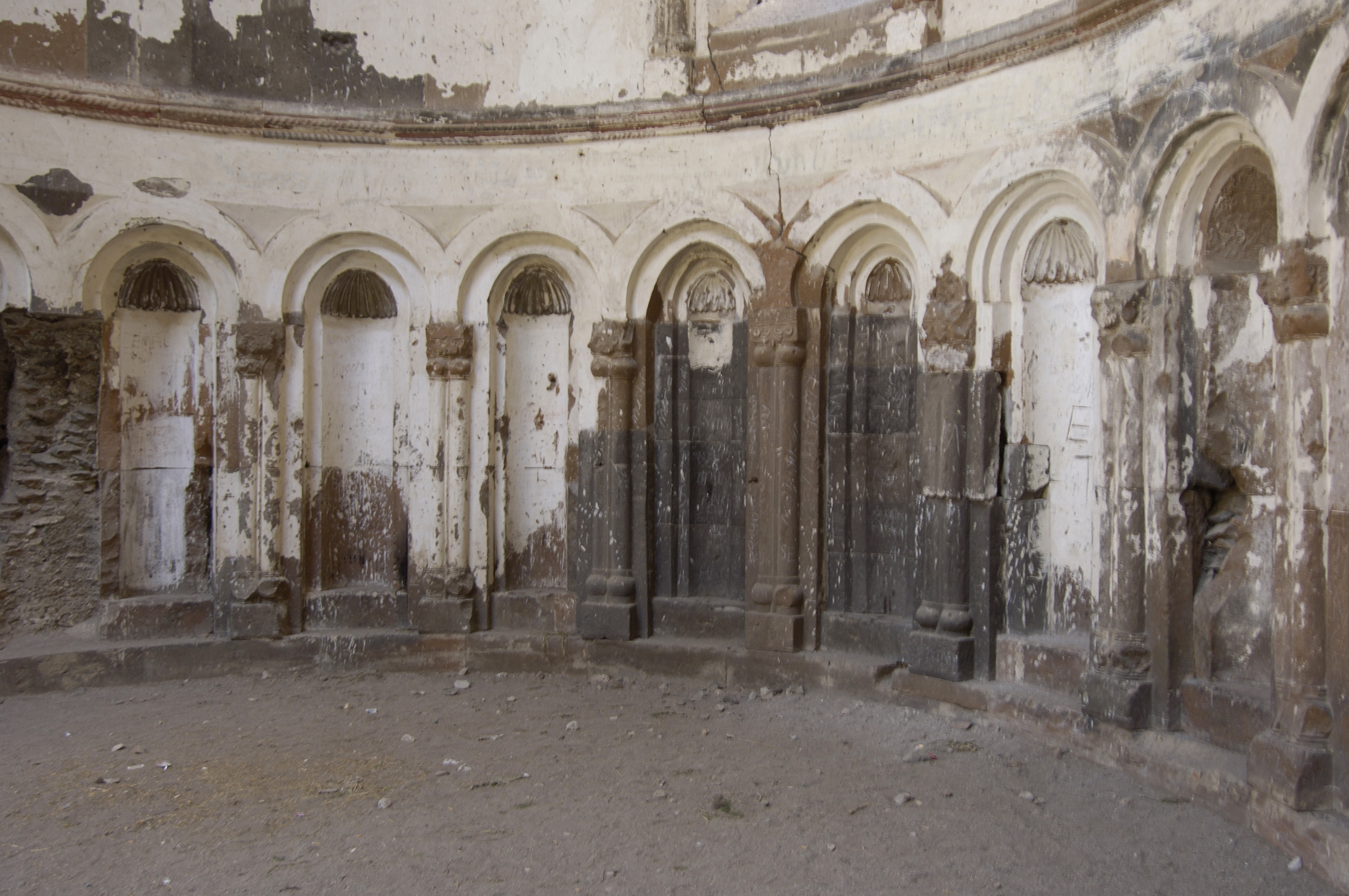
Interior

Historic and artistic depictions

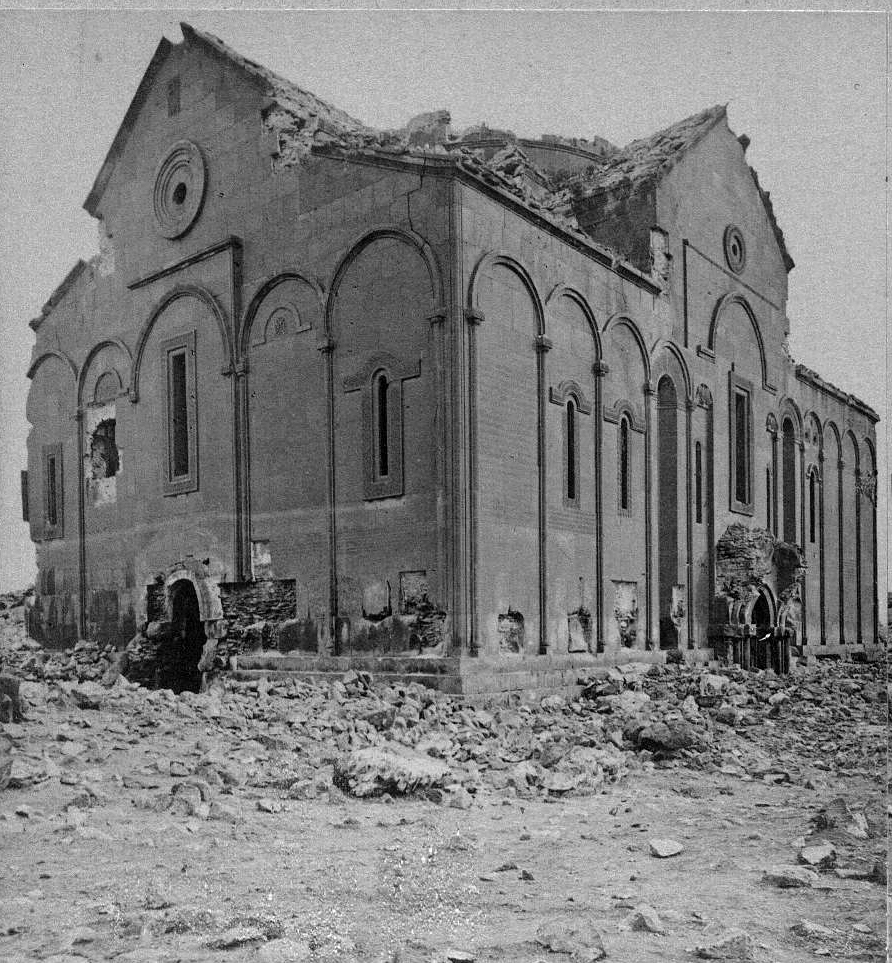
A stereoscopic photograph from the southwest, by Ohannes Kurkdjian, between 1875 and 1880

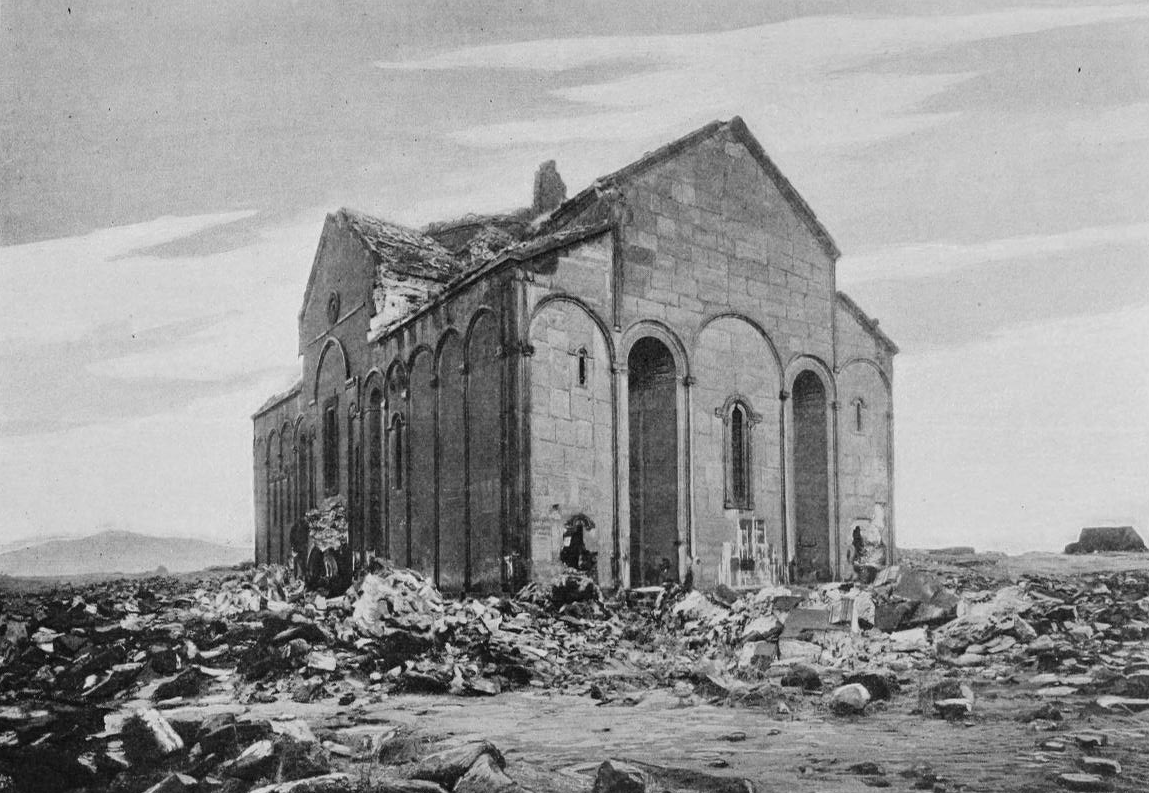
A photo of the cathedral published in a 1901 book by H. F. B. Lynch

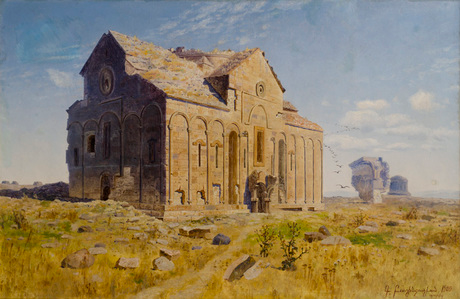
A 1900 painting of the cathedral by Gevorg Bashinjaghian, National Gallery of Armenia

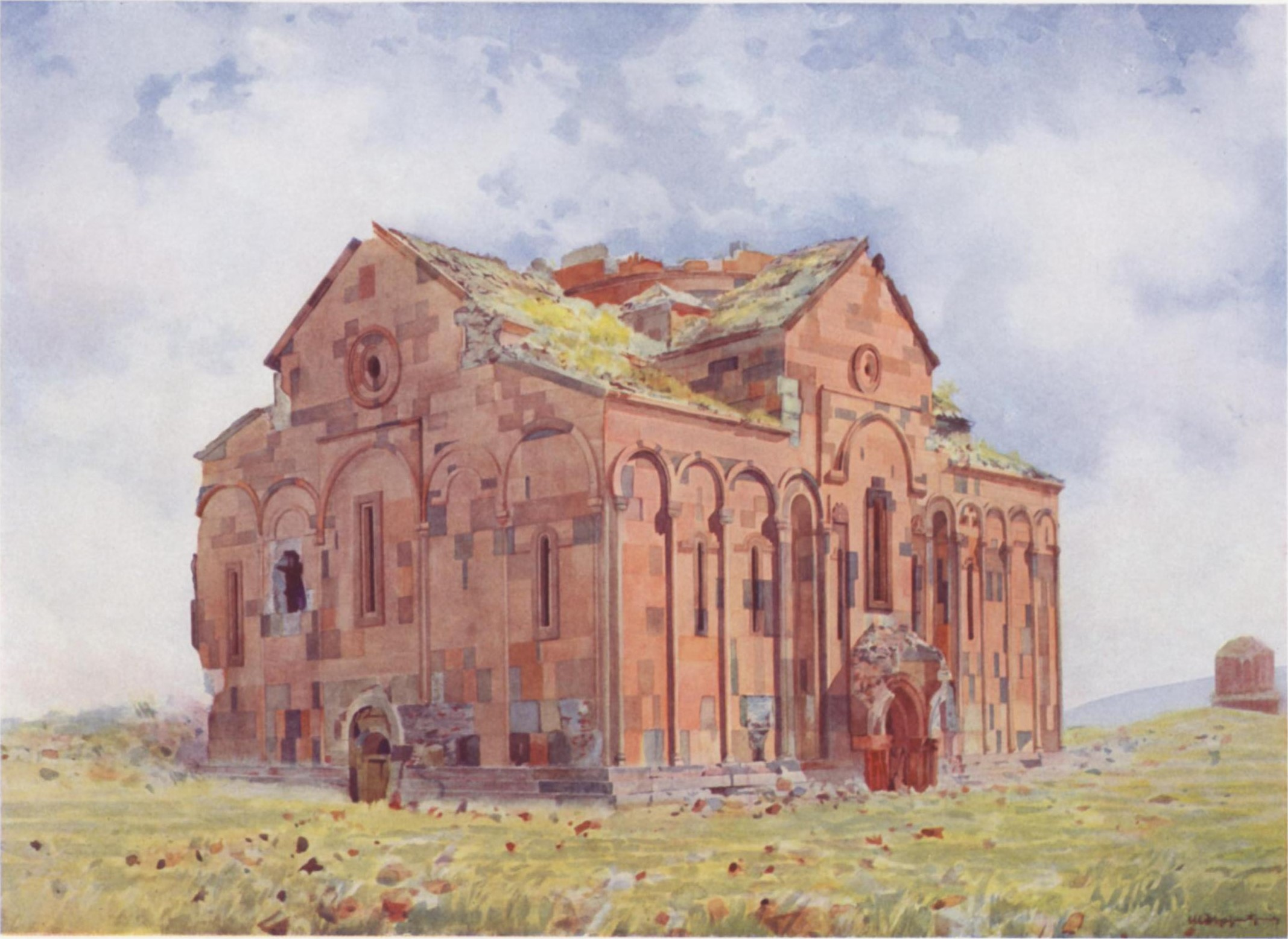
Watercolour by Arshak Fetvadjian, 1905

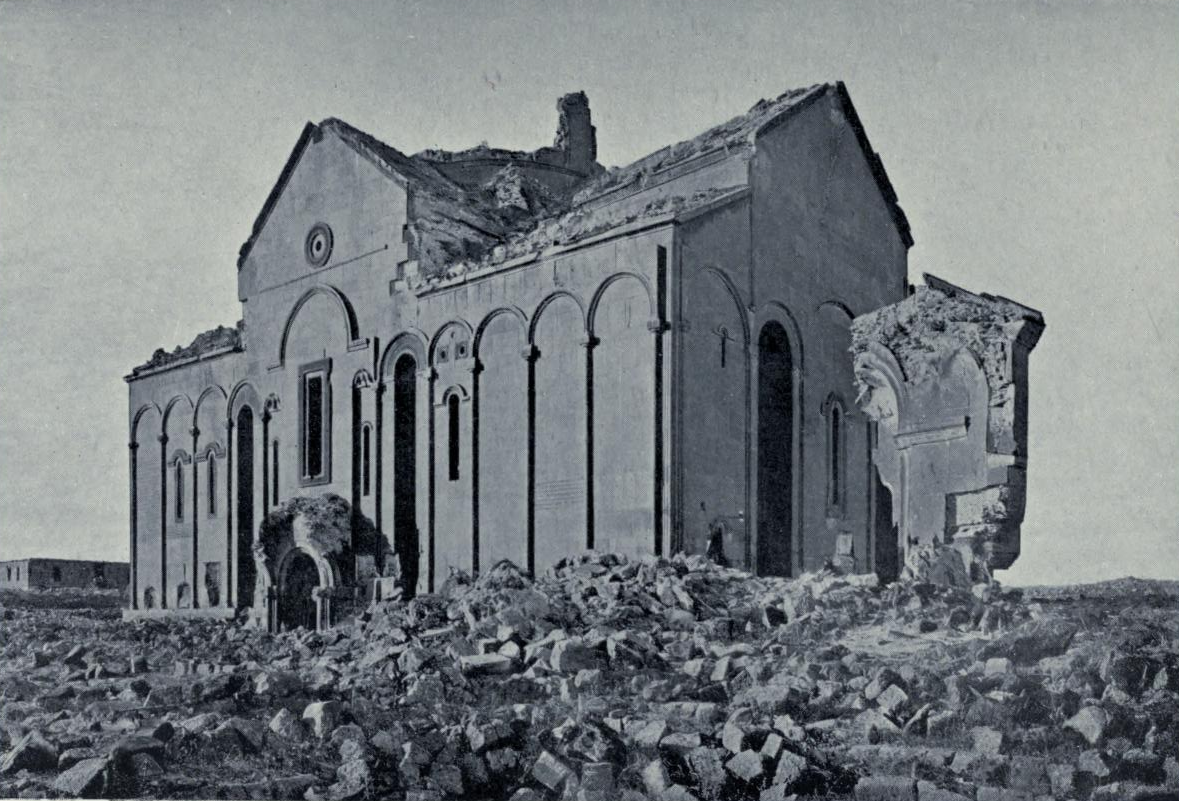
by Peshdimaldjian, published in 1912

== See also ==
- Ani
- St Gregory of Tigran Honents
- Church of the Holy Apostles (Ani)
- Trdat (architect)
- Armenian cultural heritage in Turkey
