= Authoritarian literature =

Authoritarian literature is a term used by John Gardner to designate the body of literature written by persons living under an authoritarian governmental regime. Literary works produced in these regimes share common characteristics that make the designation useful. Authoritarian regimes differ greatly in structure. In kingdoms, subjects often revere their leaders, at least publicly. Kings, or their advisors, referred to as a court, when not directly writing about a subject themselves, were the only ones who could designate, approve, and sanction writers as acceptable authorities. Government authorities also financially supported writers under a patronage system. The writers in such a system were understandably careful to ensure the composition of their work met (or would meet) the approval of authorities. Failure to comply risked official warnings, governmental sanction, or sometimes even imprisonment and loss of life.

Fiction produced under authoritarian regimes tends to be didactic. Subject matter can vary in terms of plot, but the didactic point of the work is almost always to illustrate what authorities would consider the proper comportment of individuals within the authoritarian society. This didactic point is conveyed to readers in order to idealize the existing social structure and thus, hopefully, perpetuate it. Authoritarian fiction is considered to be demonstrative in purpose rather than explorative. The author's narrative voice is also usually authoritarian in order to impart something known by the author that is presumably not known by the reader. Since most people don't enjoy the feeling of being written down to, the more successful (or popular) authors of such literature were the ones who best disguised their didactic purpose, or employed various forms of misdirection. One common way to achieve indirectness, for example, is through the use of the allegory form.

== Examples ==
Examples of authoritarian literature include many early works such as Beowulf and Pilgrim's Progress. English literature contains vestiges of authoritarian literature as recent as works by Charles Dickens. While didacticism forms a significant component of Shaw's, Orwell's and C. S. Lewis' fiction as well, their works can not strictly be considered as authoritarian literature because they were not writing at the whim of political leaders. Dickens was not writing for the British government either, but he used many of the same forms as his predecessors, who did write for the court. This can be most strongly seen in his earlier novels, such as A Tale of Two Cities and David Copperfield, which exhibits a certain preachiness. Dickens constructed his plots for the sake of demonstration rather than the purpose of exploration. However, Charles Dickens is a transitional figure, and in his later novels, such as Great Expectations, one can "feel the two impulses warring in the writer's mind".

== Contemporary works ==
Authoritarian literature is, of course, not a purely historical phenomenon. It persists as the dominant form of everyday literature of Middle Eastern countries (Turkey, Israel, Lebanon, and arguably Palestine and Iran's literature excepted), and, until recently, Chinese literature. To understand the nature of authoritarian literature's purpose is to better understand the reason for the forms in which we see literature currently being produced in these countries.

The antithesis to Authoritarian literature is Anti-Authoritarian literature. Practitioners of this genre in the aforementioned countries are routinely subjected to harsh sanctions, and many choose to go into exile in order to write freely. Still other writers suffer censorship and imprisonment at their government's hands (e.g. Sunallah Ibrahim and Abdul Rahman Munif). Authoritarian literature authors, however, who write works of fiction that support or praise governments, as expected, often see promotion to positions of authority within their respective country's governing cultural body.

== See also ==
- Didacticism
- Political fiction
- Socialist realism
- Underground literature
