= Trdat (architect) =

- Born: 940s
- Died: 1020
- Occupation: Architect
- Buildings: Ani Cathedral; Church of St. Gregory (1001-1010); Argina Cathedral; Haghpat Monastery
- Projects: Restoration of the Dome of the Haghia Sophia (989-994)

Trdat the Architect (Armenian: Տրդատ ճարտարապետ, circa 940s – 1020) was the chief architect of the Bagratid kings of Armenia, and most notable for his design of the cathedral at Ani and his reconstruction of the dome of Hagia Sophia in Constantinople.

== Work ==
Trdat was active in Armenia before and after his reconstruction of the Hagia Sophia. In 961, Ashot III moved his capital from Kars to the great city of Ani where he assembled new palaces and rebuilt the walls. The Catholicosate was moved to the Argina district in the suburbs of Ani where Trdat completed the building of the Catholicosal palace and the Mother Cathedral of Ani. This cathedral offers an example of a cruciform domed church within a rectangular plan. Trdat is also believed to have designed or supervised the construction of Surb Nshan (Holy Sign, completed in 991), the oldest structure at Haghpat Monastery.

Exterior of the Hagia Sophia

After a great earthquake in 989 partly collapsed the dome of Hagia Sophia, Byzantine officials summoned Trdat to Byzantium to organize its repair. The rebuilt dome was completed by 994. According to contemporary Armenian historian Stepanos Taronetsi (Asoghik):

Even [Hagia] Sophia, the cathedral, was torn to pieces from top to bottom. On account of this, many skillful workers among the Greeks tried repeatedly to reconstruct it. The architect and stonemason Trdat of the Armenians also happened to be there, presented a plan, and with wise understanding prepared a model, and began to undertake the initial construction, so that [the church] was rebuilt more handsomely than before.

While the circumstances in which he was asked to repair the dome are unknown, Sirarpie Der Nersessian suggested that the fact alone "is in itself a sufficient indication of his renown." Richard Krautheimer was somewhat dismissive of Trdat's role in Constantinople, suggesting that he "might have been summoned as a technician."

Garbis Armen suggested that Trdat may have transferred earthquake-proofing innovations, especially features of the dome, found at the seventh century Saint Hripsime Church in Vagharshapat such as ribs, narrow windows and short buttresses to stabilize the dome against lateral thrust, to Hagia Sophia.
