= Jean Lucas =

Jean Lucas may refer to:

- Jean Lucas (footballer, born 1995) Jean Lucas Figueiredo, Brazilian footballer
- Jean Lucas (footballer, born 1998) Jean Lucas de Souza Oliveira, Brazilian footballer
- Jean Lucas (racing driver) (1917–2003), French racing driver
- Jean Maximilien Lucas, French bookseller and publisher
- Jean Jacques Étienne Lucas, French Navy officer
- Jean Lucas-Dubreton (1883–1972), pseudonym of French historian and biographer Jean-Marie Lucas de Peslouan
