= Clandestine literature =

Publishing process

Clandestine literature, also called "underground literature", refers to a type of editorial and publishing process that involves self-publishing works, often in contradiction with the legal standards of a location. Clandestine literature is often an attempt to circumvent censorship, prosecution, or other suppression. In academic study, such literature may be referred to as heterodox publications (as opposed to officially sanctioned, orthodox publishing).

== Examples ==
Examples of clandestine literature include the Samizdat literature of Soviet dissidents; the Aljamiado literature of Spain; and the nushu writing of some upper-class women in Hunan, China, from around the 10th century to the 19th century. Clandestine publications were plentiful during the Enlightenment era in 18th-century France, circulating as pamphlets or manuscripts, usually containing texts that would have been considered highly blasphemous by the Ancien Régime, sometimes propounding outright atheism. These clandestine manuscripts particularly flourished in the 1720s, and contained such controversial works as Treatise of the Three Impostors and the Catholic priest Jean Meslier's atheistic Memoirs. Both texts were later published in edited versions by Voltaire, but handwritten manuscript copies have been found in private libraries all over Europe. The clandestine literature of 18th century France also consisted of printed works produced in neighbouring Switzerland or the Netherlands and smuggled into France. These books were usually termed "philosophical works", but varied greatly in content from pornography, utopian novels, political slander and actual philosophical works by radical enlightenment philosophers like Baron d'Holbach, Julien Offray de La Mettrie and Jean-Jacques Rousseau.

Another notable example of clandestine literature is Bruce Bethke's short story "The Etymology of Cyberpunk" which spawned an entire cyberpunk universe, proposing it as a label for a new generation of 'punk' teenagers inspired by the perceptions inherent to the Information Age.

== Purpose and process ==
The willingness to break the law may be due to ideological reasons, when works are contrary to government positions or pose a threat to the institutions in power, but also for reasons at a formal level, when publications do not comply with legal regulations imposed for the circulation of printed works. Underground literature is a type of clandestine literature that does not necessarily have the evasion of the censorship of the time as its purpose; the goal of its writers may only be to lower publishing costs, often being funded by the authors themselves.

Works that are originally published by clandestine means may eventually become established as canonical literature, such as Das Kapital and El Buscón.

A legitimate publisher in one jurisdiction may assist writers from elsewhere to circumvent their own laws by enabling them to publish abroad. The Olympia Press in Paris published several 20th-century English-language writers, including Henry Miller, who were facing censorship and possible prosecution in their own country at the time.

== See also ==
- Alternative media (U.S. political left)
- Alternative media (U.S. political right)
- Alternative media
- Censorship
- Grey literature
- List of underground newspapers (by country and state)
- News agency (alternative)
- UK Underground
- French resistance
- Polish underground press
- Samizdat
- Underground comix
- Underground press
