= Toros Toramanian =

Armenian architect

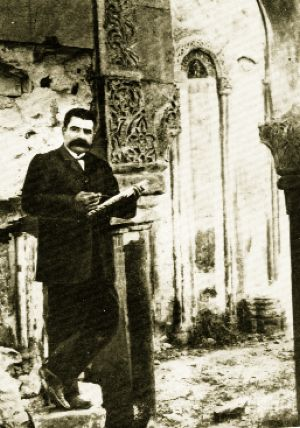
Toros Toramanian in Ani, 1907 Born: March 18, 1864

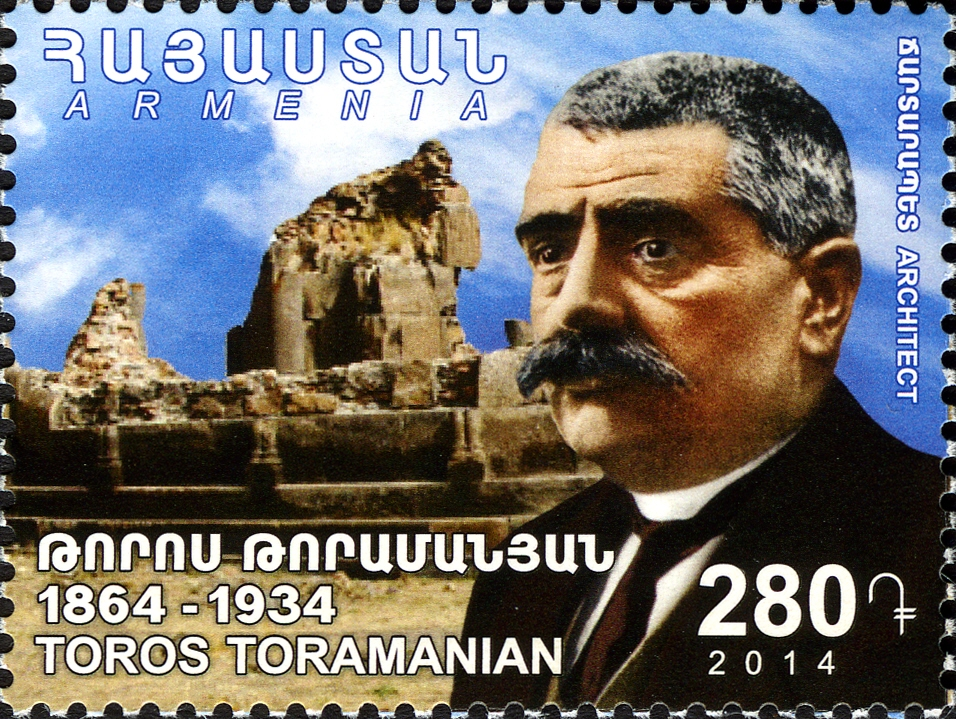
Toros Toramanian on a 2014 Armenian stamp

Toros Toramanian (Armenian: Թորոս Թորամանեան; 1864 – March 1, 1934) was a prominent Armenian architect and architectural historian. He is considered "the father of Armenian architectural historiography." Christina Maranci credited him with "establishing the practical foundation for the study of Armenian architecture with his "extensive field work, measurements, plans, and photographs."

== Biography ==
Toramanian was born in 1864, in the town of Şebinkarahisar (Շապին-Գարահիսար in Armenian), Ottoman Empire. He studied architecture at Academy of Fine Arts in Constantinople, and later at the Sorbonne in Paris, and then he worked on the detailed study of the remains of medieval Armenian architectural monuments.

Toramanian's scholarly work paved the way for the scholar, Josef Strzygowski, who, after a long and detailed study of the Christian architecture, concluded that Armenian architecture had had a significant role in the development of Byzantine and late Western European architecture. In the chaos of the Turkish–Armenian War of 1920, Toramanian lost a considerable amount of his writings and studies.

== Works ==
After graduation, he worked as an architect in Constantinople, designing apartments. In 1895, Toramanian left Constantinople after the two-day massacre against the Armenian population and relocated to Bulgaria. From 1896 to 1900, he lived in Bulgaria, engaged in construction, designing several buildings, mainly for wealthy Armenians (the Manukians, Sargis Fadyan, Daniel Bulgharatsi, etc.). He also lived in Romania for a short time. However, he was more interested in the theory of architecture. For this purpose, in 1900, he visited Greece, then Egypt and Italy to personally acquaint himself with the architectural masterpieces of the ancient world. In 1902, he went to Paris, to the Sorbonne, where he attended lectures by famous professors of architectural history, history of architecture, and art. He was engaged in the study of oriental archaeological subjects.

- Nyuter hay chartarapetutyan patmutyan (Material on the history of Armenian architecture), Vol. 1 (Yerevan: 1942) and Vol. 2 (Yerevan: 1948)

== In Ani ==
Toramanian returned to Bulgaria for a short time in 1903. However, in the spring of the same year, upon the suggestion of Karapet Pasmachyan, a Paris-based Armenian scholar, he traveled with him to Ani for three months to conduct research. Ani turned out to be a significant surprise for Toramanian. In his article "Zvartnots Church," Toramanian wrote, 'I saw all this when I visited Ani two years ago. I looked around with surprise and didn't want to believe the reality of what I saw.'

With these lines, Toramanian hinted that until the beginning of the 20th century, Armenian architecture was not recognized as a distinct school with an independent architectural style. In his "Zvartnots Church" article, Toramanian wrote, 'Unfortunately, I did not come across any reference to Armenian architecture in the section dedicated to architectural styles. Therefore, I did not imagine the existence of an Armenian style.' It was for this reason that Toramanian decided to stay in Ani and personally study the stone heritage of the Armenian people. The realization of this decision was facilitated by the presence of the famous Russian-Georgian archaeologist Nikolai Marr in Ani, who was conducting excavations for the second time. Toramanian received financial support from Marr.

== Zvartnots ==
In 1904, he went to Ejmiatsin to research early medieval Armenian architecture monuments. There, he reached Zvartnots, where Khachik Vardapet Dadian had begun excavations since 1900. Khachik Vardapet, lacking the professional qualifications that Toramanian possessed, had already ceased excavations by the time Toramanian arrived, unable to complete the work. Prior to these excavations, the ruins of the Zvartnots temple were buried under a thick layer of soil. Being an original monument and having reached us in an almost ruined state, the temple is a real puzzle for those who see it. No one could understand the original appearance of the structure, nor the meaning of the unique forms seen in the plan.

Excavations resumed under the leadership of Toramanian. He conducted a detailed study of the construction of the temple, the results of which he published in 1905 in the journal Murch, published in Tiflis, in an article entitled "Zvartnots Church". In the article, Toramanian proposed his reconstruction of the temple, suggesting it was a three-story domed structure with a flat plan. Toramanian's theory was met with suspicion by Armenian society, sparking many disputes, simply because such a structure had never been seen before, and it was extremely unusual for that time.

The disputes finally ended when Marr discovered a statue of King Gagik holding a model of the temple during excavations of St. Gregory's Church in Gagikashen, Ani. Thus, it was confirmed that Toramanian accurately reproduced the volume-spatial structure of the building by studying the plan of Zvartnots, as historical sources indicated that Gagikashen would be a replication of Zvartnots.

== In Vienna with Josef Strzygowski ==
In 1913, Toramanian went to Vienna at the invitation of Josef Strzygowski with the aim of writing a work on Armenian architecture. After some time, he decided to return to Armenia to make some additions. However, the First World War broke out, and he could not go back to Vienna. Toramanian shared with Strzygowski his enormous archive, including drawings, photographs, notes, etc., which were ultimately left with Strzygowski without Toramanian being able to retrieve them. In 1918, Strzygowski independently published his two-volume work "Architecture of Armenians and Europe," entirely based on Toramanian's materials, while remembering Toramanian as the author of the materials.

== Further works ==
From 1905 to 1909, Toramanian participated in excavations in Ani with the expedition led by the renowned archaeologist Nikolaios Mar. He studied, measured, and photographed the entire architectural heritage of its ruins, including churches, palaces, walls, etc., and carried out the reconstruction of some of them.

As a researcher, Toramanian made measurements, took photographs, and reconstructed many architectural monuments during his prolific years. He also authored numerous articles but did not manage to complete any books. The books published after his death are compilations of his works.

In 1921, he gave lectures on the history of ancient Armenian architecture at Yerevan State University.

Toramanian died in 1934 in Yerevan and was interred at the Komitas Pantheon.

Through his works, Toramanian revolutionized the history of world architecture, presenting the origins and developmental periods of Armenian architecture.

A prize named after Toros Toramanian has been established in Armenia.

== Projects ==
- Armenian Architecture (Toros Toramanian, Volume 1)
- Armenian Architecture, Volume 2
- Zvartnots, Gagkashen
- Letters(Toros Toramanian)
- "Zvartnots Church" (1905)
- "Echmiadzin Cathedral" (1909)
- "Tekor Temple" (1911)

=== Works ===
- Y. Strzygowski. "Architecture of Armenians and Europe",
- K. Ghafadarian. "Materials of the history of Armenian architecture".

== See also ==
- Armenian architecture
