= Treatise of the Three Impostors =

Book denying all three Abrahamic religions

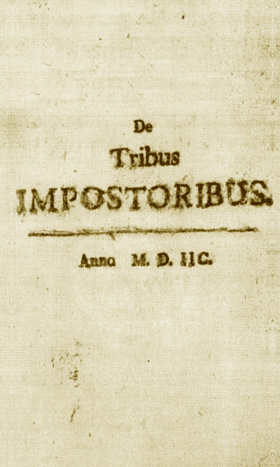
Treatise of the Three Impostors

The Treatise of the Three Impostors (Latin: De Tribus Impostoribus) was a long-rumored book denying all three Abrahamic religions: Christianity, Judaism, and Islam, with the "impostors" of the title being Jesus, Moses, and Muhammad. Hearsay concerning such a book surfaces by the 13th century and circulates through the 17th century. Authorship of the hoax book was variously ascribed to Jewish, Muslim, and Christian writers. Fabrications of the text eventually begin clandestine circulation, with a notable French underground edition Traité sur les trois imposteurs first appearing in 1719.

== Timeline of the myth ==
Date	Event
10th century	Abu Tahir al-Jannabi uses a "three impostors" slogan for political ends.
1239	Pope Gregory IX in an encyclical ascribes a view of the Abrahamic religions as founded by "three impostors" to Frederick II, Holy Roman Emperor. Through Pietro della Vigna, the excommunicated Emperor denies heresy, explicitly saying that the three impostors theory has not passed his lips.
Later in the 13th century	Thomas de Cantimpré ascribes such views to Simon of Tournai (c. 1130–1201).
14th century	Opponents of Averroism accuse Averroes of originating the "three impostors" view.
c. 1350	The Decameron by Boccaccio alludes to the "three impostors" motif in terms of religious relativism.
1632	Francisco de Quevedo mentions in his Perinola a "blasphemous book titled De tribus impostoribus mundi, which ended up being burnt with its authors in Germany."
1643	Thomas Browne ascribes authorship of such a work to Bernardino Ochino.
1656	Henry Oldenburg reports that at Oxford a politicised "three impostors" theory is current.
1669	John Evelyn publishes a work under a "three impostors" title, aimed at Sabbatai Zevi. The others named were Padre Ottomano, and Mahomed Bei, pseudonym of the adventurer Joannes Michael Cigala.
1680	As De tribus impostoribus magnis, Christian Kortholt the elder publishes an attack on Edward Herbert of Cherbury, Thomas Hobbes and Benedict Spinoza.
1680s?	De imposturis religionum was an anonymous attack on Christianity that surfaced late in the 17th century. Internal evidence makes it unlikely that the work was completed before 1680. It became known at the auction in 1716 of the library of the Greifswald theologian Johann Friedrich Mayer. This work is attributed to the jurist Johannes Joachim Müller (1661–1733).
1680s	Likely initial composition of the Traité sur les trois imposteurs, in association with Spinozan publicists. See below for its adaptation and promotion from the Netherlands.
1693	Bernard de la Monnoye writes to Pierre Bayle, claiming that no "three impostors" tract exists.
1709	John Bagford in a letter comments on the deist John Toland's efforts to pass off Spaccio by Giordano Bruno as the Treatise of the Three Impostors; and says he knows of no such genuine Treatise.
1712	De la Monnoye's letter to Bayle is reprinted, as part of his edition Menagiana, an -iana from the works of Gilles Ménage. After reprinting again, in Paris and Amsterdam, it met with an anonymous Réponse in 1716, that has been attributed to Rousset de Missy. With that, the events leading to the publication of a hoax "Treatise" had begun.

== Traité sur les trois imposteurs, from 1719 ==
The work that came to be known by this name was published in the early eighteenth century. There were eight published editions, from 1719 to 1793. There was also clandestine circulation. The Traité sur les trois imposteurs has been reckoned the most important example of the underground literature in French of the period.

The work purported to be a text handed down from generation to generation. It can be traced to the circle around Prosper Marchand, who included Jean Aymon and Jean Rousset de Missy. It detailed how the three major figures of Biblical religion in fact misrepresented what had happened to them.

According to Silvia Berti, the book was originally published as La Vie et L'Esprit de Spinosa (The Life and Spirit of Spinoza), containing both a biography of Benedict Spinoza and the anti-religious essay, and was later republished under the title Traité sur les trois imposteurs. The creators of the book have been identified by documentary evidence as Jean Rousset de Missy and the bookseller Charles Levier. The author of the book may have been a young Dutch diplomat called Jan Vroesen or Vroese. Another candidate, to whom Levier attributed the work, is Jean-Maximilien Lucas. Israel places its composition in the 1680s.

The content of the Traité has been traced primarily to Spinoza, but with subsequent additions drawn from the ideas of Pierre Charron, Thomas Hobbes, François de La Mothe Le Vayer, Gabriel Naudé and Lucilio Vanini. The reconstruction of the group of authors, given the original text, goes as far as Levier and others such as Aymon and Rousset de Missy. An account based on the testimony of the brother of the publisher Caspar Fritsch, an associate of Marchand, has Levier in 1711 borrowing the original text from Benjamin Furly.

== Events from 1719 ==
Date	Event
1765	Archibald Maclaine, in an annotation to his translation of Johann Lorenz Mosheim's Institutes, gives a history of the Traité based on Prosper Marchand's, and attributes the content to the Spaccio of Bruno, and the Spirit of Spinoza, as worked over by compilers.
1770	Voltaire publishes Épître à l'Auteur du Livre des Trois Imposteurs, a response to the hoax. It contains his remark "If God didn't exist, it would be necessary to invent Him."

== As trope ==
It has been suggested that the "three impostors" as trope can be seen as the negative form of the "ring parable", as used in Lessing's Nathan the Wise.
