= Spiritual opportunism =

Exploitation of spiritual ideas

Spiritual opportunism refers to the exploitation of spiritual ideas (or of the spirituality of others, or of spiritual authority): for personal gain, partisan interests or selfish motives. Usually the implication is that doing so is unprincipled in some way, although it may cause no harm and involve no abuse. In other words, religion becomes a means to achieve something that is alien to it, or things are projected into religion that do not belong there.

Any human being has at least some kind of spiritual sense, developed through personal reflection or undeveloped but evident from lifestyle and communications, which defines the meta-meanings of human existence, the purpose of life, the meaning of the universe and one's own place in it, and so on. This belief system may, or may not be expressed through the categories and concepts of a religion; it could be only assumed, rather than explicit. Whatever the case, such beliefs can be used in a way that they become a source of profit.

If a religious authority acquires influence over the "hearts and minds" of people who are believers in a religion, and therefore can "tap into" the most intimate and deepest-felt concerns of believers, it can also gain immense power from that. This power can be used in a self-interested manner, exploiting opportunities to benefit the position of the religious authority or its supporters in society. This could be considered as inconsistent with the real intentions of the religious belief, or it might show lack of respect for the spiritual autonomy of others. The "good faith" of people is then taken advantage of, in ways that involve some kind of deceit, or some dubious, selfish motive.

Even although, in his Treatise on Toleration (1763), the famous French liberal philosopher Voltaire expressed a distaste for religious fanaticism, he was at the same time convinced that religion could be a useful tool to keep the masses under control. He said famously, "If God did not exist, it would be necessary to invent him." In his Épître à l'Auteur du Livre des Trois Imposteurs, a criticism of atheism in which he makes this remark, Voltaire opined that faith in God is a "sublime system" that is "necessary to man": it is, "...the sacred tie that binds society." Similar ideas have been expressed by numerous political leaders, business leaders, and intellectuals for centuries, both right-wing and left-wing. In their utopias of social engineering, early socialistic thinkers such as Auguste Comte (Treatise on Sociology Instituting the Religion of Humanity 1851-54) and Henri de Saint-Simon (New Christianity 1825) envisaged a new secular (or "scientific") belief-system, analogous to a religion, which would unite the people humanely, and ensure social cohesion. This idea is not as unrealistic as it sounds, but it could be interpreted as an opportunist use of people's faith for political purposes.

Politicians around the world recognize the power of religion, and therefore they usually try to keep on the good side of religious authorities and believers. They are very aware, that religion can be not just a force for social stability, but can also be the cause of enormous animosity among the peoples, if spiritual sensitivities are offended. For example, when in February 2012 protests broke out in various parts of Afghanistan over the improper disposal of Korans at the US military Bagram Air Base, the US government apologized officially (see 2012 Afghanistan Quran burning protests). Some religious wars and crusades have lasted a very long time, being pursued quite relentlessly - regardless of the number of casualties, and regardless of who happened to be winning. It creates plenty potential to exploit religious likes and dislikes opportunistically, to advance political, social or business interests.

The term spiritual opportunism is also used in the sense of casting around for suitable spiritual beliefs borrowed and cobbled together in some way to justify, condemn or "make sense of" particular ways of behaving, usually with some partisan or ulterior motive. This may not be abusive, but it often gives rise to criticisms or accusations that the given spiritual beliefs:

- are not an organic, sincere or authentic expression of the real nature of the people who contrived them.
- do not really express what people's lives are about, but are in some way an "artificial add-on".
- lack any deeper principled foundation, and are more an "eclectic, self-serving concoction"
- are made to serve partisan interests, contrary to the real intention of the beliefs.

Supporters of traditional religions such as Christianity, Islam, Hinduism or Buddhism sometimes complain that people (such as New Age enthusiasts) seek out spiritual beliefs that serve only themselves, as a form of "spiritual opportunism". Such complaints are often highly controversial, because people are considered to have the right to their own spiritual beliefs (they may not have that right, to the extent that they are socially excluded unless they profess certain spiritual beliefs, but they may only subscribe "formally" or "outwardly" to them).

Because spiritual beliefs are a highly personal matter in the first instance and concern personal meanings, they are often difficult to criticize because "they just are what they are". As they concern highly abstract, metaphysical principles, it is difficult to prove their inconsistency, even using the criterion of whether people "act according to their beliefs". People can always argue that the personal meaning they attach to something or the personal associations they make, cannot be adequately expressed in the language of others. If accusations of spiritual opportunism are made, therefore, evidential proof depends greatly on what people are willing to reveal (or "confess") about themselves in what they say and do.

Spiritual opportunism sometimes refers also to the practice of proselytizing one's spiritual beliefs when any opportunity to do so arises, for the purpose of winning over, or persuading others, about the superiority of these beliefs. In this context, the spiritual opportunist may engage in various actions, themselves not directly related to the spiritual beliefs, with the specific aim of convincing others of the superiority of his own belief system – it may effectively amount to "buying their support".
