= Simon of Tournai =

Simon of Tournai (c. 1130–1201) was a professor at the University of Paris in the late twelfth century.

== Biography ==
His date of birth is uncertain, but he was teaching before 1184, as he signed a document at the same time as Gerard de Pucelle, the Bishop of Coventry, who died that year.

Simon taught philosophy for ten years, and was said to be brilliant. Then he moved on to teaching theology, with equal success. He used the writings of Aristotle, whose works were becoming known, and other philosophical works.

This eventually brought suspicion upon him from the enemies of the new philosophy. According to Thomas of Cantimpré, he would have pronounced the blasphemy of the three impostors and would have immediately been struck with epilepsy. Matthew Paris attributes another blasphemy to a Simon (de) Churnay, who is believed to be Simon de Tournai. These anecdotes find little credit among modern historians. The 1913 Catholic Encyclopedia maintains that all of the surviving works of Simon of Tournai show an orthodox Catholicism.

Charles Baudelaire's poem The Punishment of Pride is alleged to reference Simon.
