= Épître à l'Auteur du Livre des Trois Imposteurs =

1770 epistle in verse form written by Voltaire

"Épître à l'Auteur du Livre des Trois Imposteurs" (English title: "Letter to the Author of The Three Impostors") is an epistle in verse form written by Voltaire and published in 1770 (see 1770 in poetry). It is a letter to the anonymous writers and publishers of the Treatise of the Three Impostors. It contains one of the most famous Voltaire quotes, "If God hadn't existed, it would have been necessary to invent him." This quote itself was countered by the 19th-century anarchist Mikhail Bakunin during his exile in his book God and the State with "If God really existed, it would be necessary to abolish him."
