= Sirarpie Der Nersessian =

Armenian art historian (1896–1989)

- Born: September 5, 1896; Constantinople, Ottoman Empire
- Died: July 5, 1989 (aged 92); Paris, France
- Education: Sorbonne University
- Awards: Order of Saint Gregory the Illuminator (1960, First Class); Anania Shirakatsi Award (1981, Armenian Academy of Sciences)
- Scientific career
- Fields: Armenian studies, Byzantine studies
- Workplaces: Dumbarton Oaks; Wellesley College; Harvard University
- Doctoral advisor: Gabriel Millet

Sirarpie Der Nersessian (5 September 1896 – 5 July 1989) was an art historian who specialized in the art of Armenia and the Byzantine Empire. Der Nersessian was a renowned academic and a pioneer in Armenian art history. She taught at several institutions in the United States, including Wellesley College in Massachusetts and as Henri Focillon Professor of Art and Archaeology at Harvard University. She was a senior fellow at Dumbarton Oaks, its deputy director from 1954 to 1955 and 1961–62, and a member of its Board of Scholars. Der Nersessian was also a member of several international institutions such as the British Academy (1975), the Académie des Inscriptions et Belles-Lettres (1978), and the Armenian Academy of Sciences (1966). By the 1970s, she was recognized as the leading scholar in Armenian studies.

== Biography ==
=== Education ===
Der Nersessian was born the youngest of three children in Constantinople in 1896. She came from a well-to-do family (her maternal uncle was then-Armenian Patriarch of Constantinople Maghakia Ormanian). Her parents died while she was still young: her mother Akabi, when she was nine, and her father Mihran, when she was eighteen. She attended the Essayan School and the English High School for Girls in Constantinople, gaining fluency in Armenian, English and French at an early age. In 1915, during the height of the Armenian genocide, Der Nersessian and her sister Arax (by then orphans) managed to flee to Europe, settling in Geneva.

Der Nersessian studied at the University of Geneva for several years until moving to Paris in 1919. She was admitted to the Sorbonne, where she studied history in the École des Hautes Études de l'université de Paris. She worked under Byzantine scholars Charles Diehl and Gabriel Millet and art historian Henri Focillon. In 1922, she became Millet's assistant, and with his help, published one of her first articles in 1929. The two dissertations (graduate students then had to submit two theses) that she presented for her doctorat d'etat, "L'illustration du roman de Barlaam et Joasaph" and a thesis on Armenian illuminated manuscripts during the late medieval period, were well-received, earning her a Mention très honorable, and both were awarded with prizes by the Académie des Inscriptions et Belles-Lettres and Revue des Études Grecques when they were published in 1937.

=== Professor and pioneer ===
In 1930, Der Nersessian moved to the United States at the suggestion of her three mentors, Byzantinists Charles Rufus Morey, Albert M. Friend Jr., and Walter Cook, becoming a part-time lecturer at Wellesley College in Massachusetts. She taught art history at Wellesley, quickly being promoted to full professor and later becoming the department chair of the art history program and director of the Farnsworth Museum (now the Davis Museum). Der Nersessian was the first woman to teach Byzantine art at a women's college, the first woman to be decorated with the medal of Saint Gregory the Illuminator by Catholicos Vazgen I in 1960, the first woman invited to lecture at the Collège de France in Paris, the only woman in her time to gain full professorship at Dumbarton Oaks, and the second woman to be honored with a gold medal from the Society of Antiquaries of London in 1970. In 1947, she received the Achievement Award from the American Association of University Women.

Der Nersessian remained at Dumbarton Oaks until 1978, when she retired to France and lived with her sister in Paris. Upon retirement, she had her entire library shipped to the Matenadaran in Yerevan, so as to better help Armenian scholars in their studies. Shortly after her death in 1989, an endowment fund for prospective art history students in Armenia, the Fonds Sirarpie Der Neressian at the Institut de Recherches sur les Miniatures Arméno-Byzantines, was created in her honor.

== Select bibliography ==
Der Nersessian's scholarly output chiefly focused on art history, and more specifically on the study of church architecture, illuminated manuscripts, miniatures and sculpture.

Her 1945 book Armenia and the Byzantine Empire was praised by art historians David Talbot Rice, Jurgis Baltrušaitis, and Alexander Vasiliev. Vasiliev wrote in his review of the book that she was "the best authority of our day on Armenian history, art, and civilization." Vrej Nersessian described her Armenian art (1979, French: 1977) as the "most comprehensive and most beautiful book" on the subject.

Below is a partial list of books and articles that she authored.

=== Books ===
- Armenia and the Byzantine Empire. Cambridge, MA: Harvard University Press, 1945.
- Aght'amar: Church of the Holy Cross. Cambridge, MA: Harvard University Press, 1964.
- Armenian Manuscripts in the Walters Art Gallery. Baltimore: The Trustees, 1973.
- Armenian Miniatures from Isfahan. Brussels: Les Editeurs d’Art Associés, 1986.
- The Armenians. New York: Praeger, 1969.
- (in French) L'Art arménien. Paris: Art européen. Publications filmées d'art et d'histoire, 1965.
- (in French) L'illustration du roman de Barlaam et Joasaph. Paris: de Boccard, 1937.
- Miniature Painting in the Armenian Kingdom of Cilicia from the Twelfth to the Fourteenth Century. Washington D.C.: Dumbarton Oaks Studies, 1993.

=== Articles and chapters ===
- "The Armenian Chronicle of the Constable Smpad or of the 'Royal Historian.'" Dumbarton Oaks Papers 13 (1959): pp. 141–168.
- "An Armenian Gospel of the Fifteenth Century," The Boston Public Library Quarterly 2 (1950): pp. 3–20.
- (in Armenian) "A General View of the Manuscripts of San Lazarro." Bazmavep (1947): pp. 269–272.
- "Pagan and Christian Art in Egypt. An exhibition at the Brooklyn Museum." The Art Bulletin 33 (1941): pp. 165–167.
- "Two Miracles of the Virgin in the Poems of Gautier de Coincy," Dumbarton Oaks Papers 41 (1987): pp. 157–163.
- "The Kingdom of Cilician Armenia," in Kenneth M. Setton, ed., A History of the Crusades, vol. 2: The Later Crusades, 1189-1311. Madison: University of Wisconsin Press 1969.
