= Jean Maximilien Lucas =

Jean-Maximilien Lucas (died 1697) was a French bookseller and publisher, resident in the Netherlands from around 1667. He is now known as the first biographer of Baruch Spinoza.

== Life ==
Lucas was born in Rouen at an uncertain date, 1636 or 1646. Having migrated to the Netherlands about 1667, he became a citizen of Amsterdam in 1670. He published a number of books, but was declared bankrupt in 1680.

Without personal acquaintance with Spinoza, who died in 1677, Lucas met members of his circle through Jan Rieuwertsz, Spinoza's publisher. The 1719 biography, La vie de Monsieur Benoit de Spinosa is generally attributed to him, following Charles Levier. Internal evidence shows it was a production of the period immediately after Spinoza's death. It is hagiographical in tone and publicizes Spinozism. Pierre Bayle drew on it, in manuscript, access being provided by Jan Rieuwertsz junior. The other work published with it, L'Esprit de Monsieur Benoit de Spinosa, is now attributed to Jan Vroesen (1672–1725).

Lucas also was involved in production of clandestine journals in French, directed against Louis XIV.
