= Christina Maranci =

American historian (born 1968)

Christina Maranci (born 1968) is an Armenian-American researcher, writer, translator, historian, and professor at currently serving as the Mashtots Professor of Armenian Studies at Harvard University. She is considered an expert on the history and development of Armenian architecture.

== Life ==
Maranci was born in 1968 in the United States and grew up in Connecticut. She is of Armenian descent. Her father was born in Istanbul, Turkey and her mother was born in the United States. She attained her Bachelor of Arts degree in Art History at Vassar College in 1990. Maranci continued her education and received a master's degree at Princeton University in the Art and Archeology department. She received her Ph.D. at Princeton University in 1998 in the Art and Archeology department with her dissertation Medieval Armenian Architecture in Historiography: Josef Strzygowski and his Legacy. She also audited courses with Nina Garsoïan at New York University.

She was an assistant professor at the University of Wisconsin–Milwaukee from 2001 to 2004, and an associate professor there through 2008. From 2008 to 2016 she was an associate professor in the Department of Art and Art History at Tufts University, and from 2016 to 2022, a full professor.

In 2022 she was appointed to the Mashtots Chair of Armenian Studies at Harvard University, becoming the first woman and the first person of Armenian descent in that position. She is the third holder of the chair since its inauguration in 1969, after Robert W. Thomson who held the position from 1969 to 1992 and James R. Russell who held the chair from 1992 to 2016.

== Notable fellowship and awards ==
- Calouste Gulbenkian Foundation Fellowship (1995–1997)
- Mellon Dissertation Research Fellowship, Princeton University (1997–1998)
- University of Madison, Wisconsin – Graduate School Research Award Fellowship (2006)
- University of Madison, Wisconsin – Center for 21st-Century Studies Research Fellowship (2007–2008)
- Tufts University – Faculty and Research Award (2010)

She is featured in the 2011 book Encyclopedia of Prominent Armenian Women edited by Zori Balayan.

== Works ==
Maranci's research is mainly on medieval Armenian history and the relationship with the Sasanian, Byzantine, and Islamic empires. She also focuses on the problems found in modern historiography. Maranci's 2001 book Medieval Armenian Architecture: Constructions of Race and Nation highlights art historian Josef Strzygowski and his important contributions and influence in the studies of Armenian architecture. Her recent works focus on the Byzantine influence into Armenian art and architecture. She has published A Survival Guide for Art History Students (2004), which provides Art History students with helpful assistance and information to help them when taking Art History courses. The languages Maranci researches in include Italian, English, German, French, Armenian (Classical Armenian and Modern Armenian) and Greek.

Maranci is also deemed as one of the world's experts and authorities on the Cathedral of Mren, an Armenian cathedral in Turkey that is on the verge of collapse.

=== Books ===
- Medieval Armenian Architecture: Constructions of Race and Nation (2001)
- A Survival Guide for Art History Students (2004)
- Vigilant Powers: Three Churches of Early Medieval Armenia (2015)
- The Art of Armenia: An Introduction (2018)
