= Khoren I of Armenia =

Patriarch of the Armenian Apostolic Church (1932–1938)

His Holiness Khoren I Muradbekian Խորեն Ա Մուրադբեկյան
- Supreme Patriarch and Catholicos of All Armenians
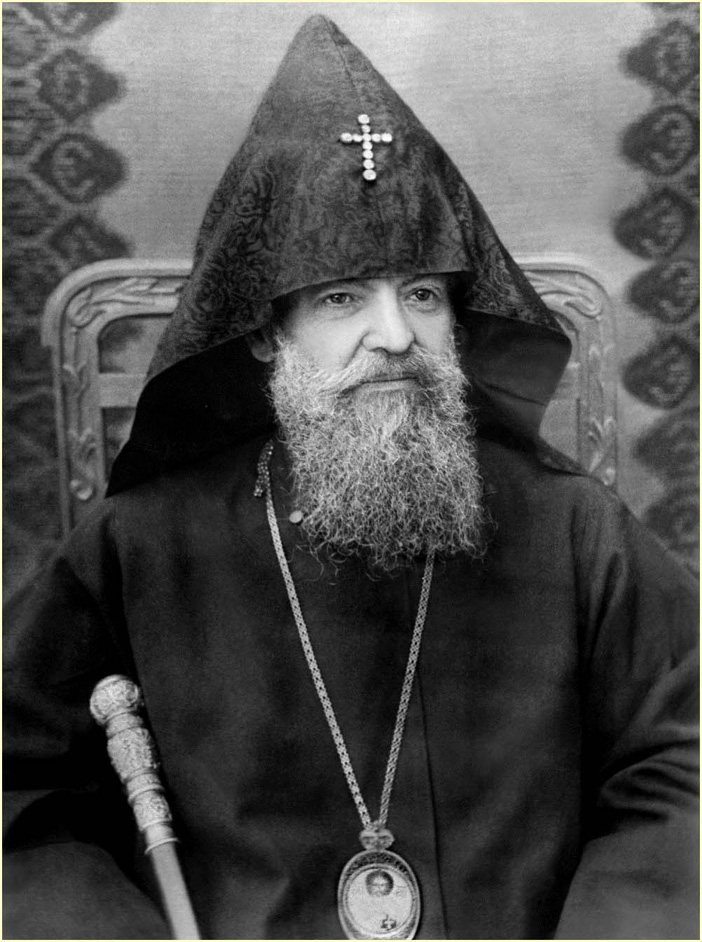
- Church: Armenian Apostolic Church
- See: Mother See of Holy Etchmiadzin
- Elected: 12 November 1932
- Installed: 13 November 1932
- Term ended: 5/6 April 1938
- Predecessor: Gevorg V
- Successor: Gevorg VI
- Previous post: Bishop of Yerevan (1910–24)

Personal details
- Born: Aleksandr Muradbekian; 8 December 1873 Tiflis, Tiflis Governorate, Russian Empire
- Died: April 6, 1938 (aged 64) Pontifical Residence, Vagharshapat, Armenian SSR, Soviet Union
- Buried: Etchmiadzin Cathedral (since 1996); Saint Gayane Church (1938–1996)
- Occupation: Priest, educator

Khoren I Muradbekian (Armenian: Խորեն Ա Մուրադբեկյան; December 8, 1873 – April 5/6, 1938) was an Armenian Apostolic religious figure who served as Catholicos of All Armenians from 1932 until his murder in 1938. He previously served as locum tenens, between 1923 and 1932, in the latter years of and after the death of Catholicos Gevorg V, and bishop of Yerevan from 1910 to 1924.

Khoren I died in mysterious circumstances at the Pontifical Residence in Etchmiadzin. The Armenian Church and most historians believe he was murdered by the NKVD, the Soviet secret police. He was reburied at the courtyard of Etchmiadzin Cathedral in 1996, after the collapse of the Soviet Union, next to other Catholicoi. The Armenian Church considers him a martyr.

== Biography ==
=== Early years ===
Aleksandr Muradbekian (Armenian: Ալեքսանդր Մուրադբեկեան) was born on December 8, 1873, in Tiflis. In 1883 he began his education at the Nersisian Seminary in his hometown, from which he graduated in 1892. Among his teachers were prominent Armenian intellectuals Stepan Malkhasyants, Perch Proshian, and Makar Yekmalyan. Almost nothing is known about his life and career from 1892 to 1897. He may have attended the Imperial Moscow University as an auditing student or he may have studied at universities in Switzerland. In 1897 he was appointed a music teacher at the seminary by Catholicos Mkrtich Khrimian. In June 1901 he was relieved from his position as teacher and became a member of the Etchmiadzin congregation. In September he was ordained sarkavag (deacon) and in December an abegha (priest) and was given the ecclesiastical name "Khoren". He initially served as a priest in Nor Bayazet (modern Gavar) and the surrounding villages. In March 1902 he was given the title of a vardapet. He oversaw the construction of new churches in Nor Bayazet and Basargechar (modern Vardenis).

In June 1903 he was exiled to Oryol, Russia by the orders of Grigory Golitsyn, the Russian Viceroy of Transcaucasia, for disobeying the Russian government's decision to confiscate the properties of the Armenian Church. He returned to Russian Armenia in April 1905 after the decision was cancelled. In August 1905 he was appointed head of the Armenian Church in western Georgia (Gori, Imereti, Batumi) and Ardvin. He returned to Etchmiadzin in 1907 only to move to Nor Bayazet.

In 1910 Muradbekian was appointed primate of Yerevan (Erivan), the single largest diocese of the Armenian Church. He was ordained bishop by Catholicos Matteos (Matthew) II in September 1910. After the Bolshevik Revolution of 1917 he headed the Armenian National Council in Yerevan. In 1919 he participated in the Paris Peace Conference as a mediator between the two competing Armenian delegations. He traveled to the United States in 1920 to help reorganize the Armenian Church life there and raise funds for the First Republic of Armenia.

=== Soviet period & Catholicos ===
Muradbekian returned to Armenia in December 1920 after the country's government was already taken over by the Soviets. He was selected by Catholicos Gevorg (George) V as the church's chief negotiator with the Soviet government of Armenia. On March 4, 1923, the Catholicos appointed him as the head of the Supreme Ecclesiastical Council and as locum tenens of the Catholicos. In the next year, Muradbekian was relieved from his position as primate of the Araratian (Yerevan) Diocese.

Following the death of Catholicos Gevorg V on May 8, 1930, Muradbekian served as actual locum tenens for more than two years, until he was elected Catholicos on November 12, 1932. He was enthroned as Catholicos on November 13 at Etchmiadzin Cathedral. His reign was coupled with heavy repressions against the Armenian Church by Soviet authorities. Nevertheless, he was as "more pro-Moscow" than his predecessor. During his reign, he tried to establish peace and improve relations with the dioceses in the Armenian diaspora and raise funds for the restoration of Etchmiadzin Cathedral. The New York Times wrote that Khoren was "regarded by fellow-Armenians as an able leader who had successfully reconciled his spiritual duties with his civil responsibilities as a Soviet citizen."

== Death ==
Muradbekian died in the late hours of April 5 or early hours of April 6, 1938. According to the Armenian Church and post-Soviet historiography, he was strangled to death by NKVD agents in his bedroom at the Old Pontifical Residence (Veharan) in Etchmiadzin. This is also the view held by many historians, (Note: such as Elizabeth Redgate, Rouben Paul Adalian, Vrej Nersessian, Christopher J. Walker, Felix Corley, Hratch Tchilingirian, Theo van Lint, and Thomas J. Samuelian.) while others (Note: such as Simon Payaslian, George Bournoutian, Manuel Sarkisyanz, Thomas de Waal, Mary Matossian) write about the widely held belief that he was murdered by the NKVD.

Muradbekian's murder was part of the larger campaign to suppress the Armenian Church under Stalin. Violence against clergy was commonplace in the 1930s, especially during the height of the Great Purge in 1937–1938. In total some 67 Armenian clergymen were killed by the Soviets, including 64 in 1937–1938 alone. The anti-Soviet dissident Armenian Church U.S. diocese noted that Muradbekian became the first head of the Armenian Church (Catholicos) to be murdered since the 5th century Hovsep (Joseph) of Vayots Dzor was killed by the Persians.

=== Circumstances ===
The circumstances of his death were never definitely established. Soviet Armenian authorities claimed he died of a heart attack. Official Soviet Armenian historiography entirely overlooked the circumstances of his death. For instance, the Armenian Soviet Encyclopedia entry on him did not indicate the cause of his death.

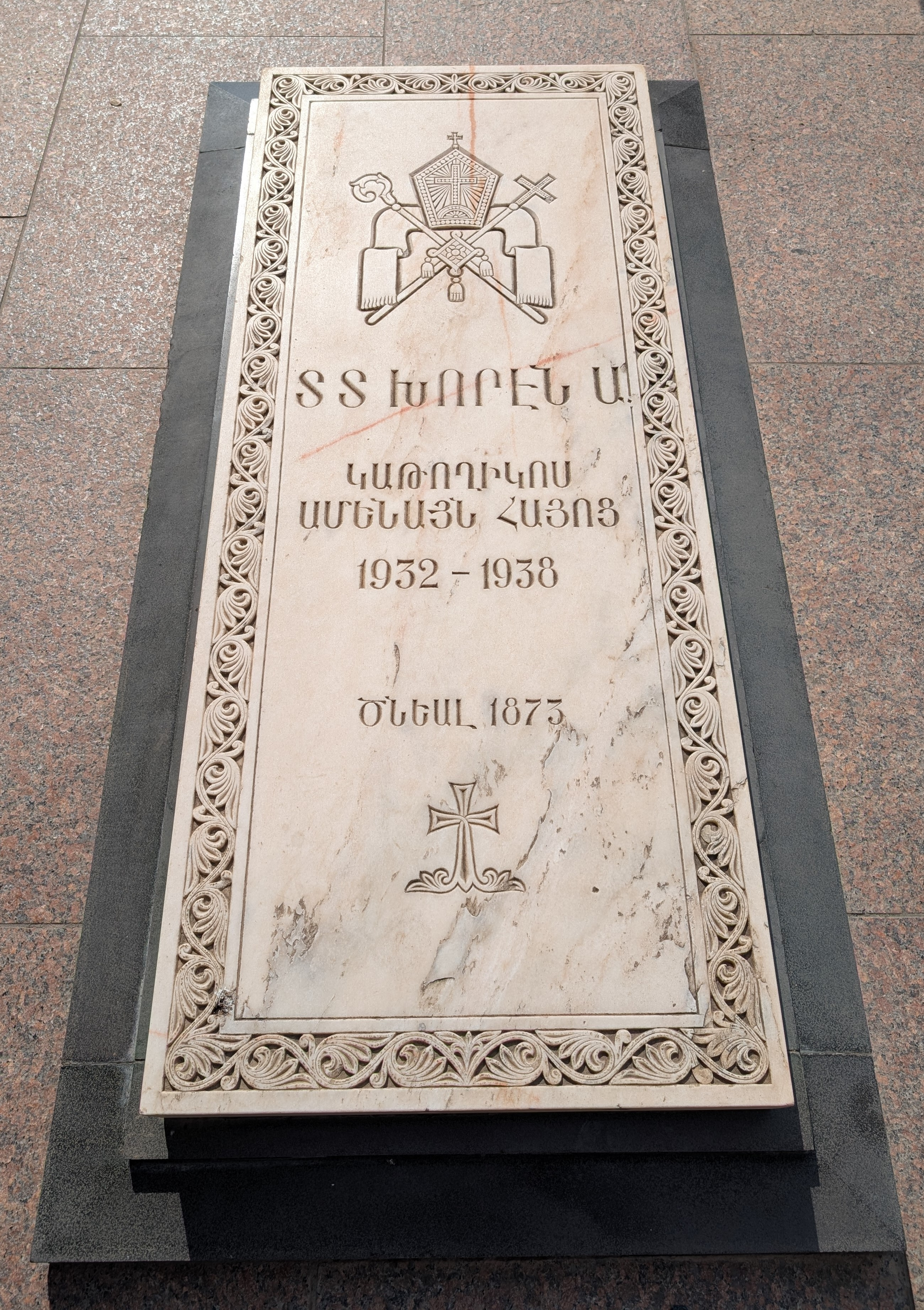
The tombstone of Khoren I near Etchmiadzin Cathedral.

According to a private investigation by Torgom Vehapetian, a diaspora Armenian who resided in Soviet Armenia in 1966–1971, Khoren I was killed by a woman named Piruz, a member of a group of security agents who wanted the key to the treasury, which Khoren I refused to give to them. They alleged that the church possessed a large amount of arms and treasures, which the state wanted to confiscate. The woman reportedly hit the Catholicos in the head with an electrical cable. Vehapetian wrote that witnesses believed it constituted involuntary manslaughter since their intent was to scare him. According to another version, Khoren I was strangled to death by Soviet security agents. This view has become more widely accepted, based on forensic evidence and evidence from his burial.

According to Vazgen I, Catholicos from 1955 to 1994, Khoren I was killed on the orders of Viktor Khvorоstian, the Interior Minister of Soviet Armenia, who himself was executed shortly thereafter. Khvorstian claimed in June 1938 that Khoren I had died of a heart attack because he foresaw the end of his life and the catholicosate of Etchmiadzin. Vazgen I also noted that Grigory Arutinov, the First Secretary of the Communist Party of Armenia in 1937–1953, had told him that Lavrentiy Beria was ultimately responsible for Khoren I's murder.

A 2023 study suggested that the Soviet authorities' interactions with Catholicos Khoren I were driven above all by financial interests, namely compelling him to transfer diaspora funds to Soviet Armenia, resorting to threats and the intimidation of those close to him. Kanakara Hayrapetyan argues that murdering the Catholicos was not the intended goal as he retained considerable moral authority in the diaspora and his assassination risked prompting the relocation of the Armenian Apostolic Church's center abroad, which would have severed the Soviet Union's last meaningful leverage over Armenian communities. She explains the unusually hasty burial to the authorities' desire to forestall public gatherings.

=== Burial ===
His body remained at the residence for two days until he was buried at the cemetery of the nearby Saint Gayane Church by several nuns of Etchmiadzin. His remains were reburied near the entrance of the same church by locum tenens Gevorg Chorekchian in 1941 with a gravestone. On September 7, 1996, the remains of Khoren I were reburied by Catholicos Karekin I near the entrance of Etchmiadzin Cathedral, next to other Catholicoi of the Armenian Church.

== Bibliography ==
- Terteryan, Varuzhan (1994). "Խորեն Ա Մուրադբեկյան Ամենայն Հայոց Կաթողիկոսի կյանքն ու գործունեությունը [The Life and Career of Catholicos of All Armenians Khoren I]". Etchmiadzin (in Armenian). 51 (4–5): 68–77.
- Hayrapetyan, Kanakara (2018). "Ամենայն Հայոց Կաթողիկոս Խորէն Ա. Մուրադբեկյանի մահվան առեղծվածի վերլուծությունը պատմագիտության մեջ [Historiographical analysis of the mysterious death of Khoren I Muradbekyan, Catholicos of All Armenians]". Etchmiadzin (in Armenian). 75 (7): 136–146. (archived PDF)
- Manukyan, A. S (1996). "Եկեղեցին Հայաստանում 1930-ական թվերին [The Church in Armenia in the 1930s]" (PDF). Banber Yerevani Hamalsarani (in Armenian). 89 (2). Yerevan State University: 188–199. Archived from the original (PDF) on 2017-05-13.

Preceded by George V of Armenia followed by Vacant position (1930–1932)	Catholicoi of the Mother See of Holy Echmiadzin and All Armenians; 1932–1938	Succeeded by Vacant position (1938–1945) followed by George VI of Armenia
