= Treaty of Kars =

1921 peace treaty

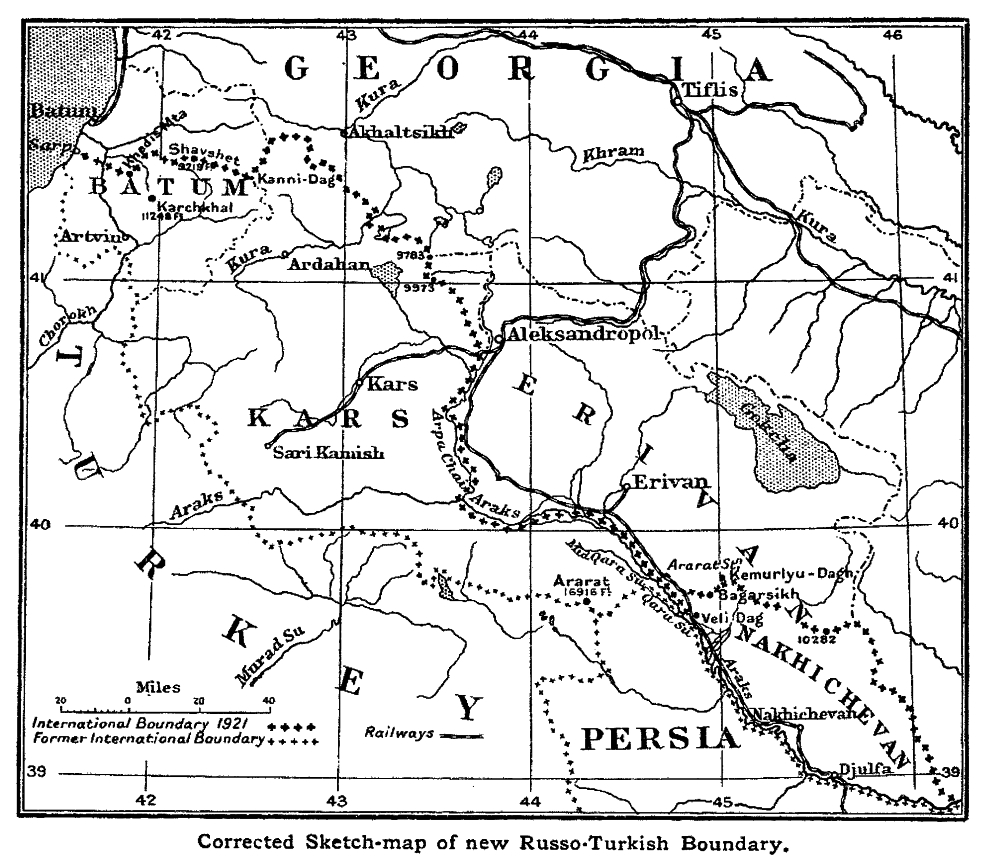
- Type: Peace treaty
- Signed: 13 October 1921
- Location: Kars, Turkey
- Condition: Ratification: (Ottoman Empire) Grand National Assembly of Turkey; (Russian Soviet Federative Socialist Republic) Russian SFSR; (Armenian Soviet Socialist Republic) Armenian SSR; (Azerbaijan Soviet Socialist Republic) Azerbaijan SSR; (Georgian Soviet Socialist Republic) Georgian SSR
- Languages: Russian, French

The Treaty of Kars (Note: Turkish: Kars Antlaşması, Russian: Карсский договор, romanized: Karskii dogovor, Georgian: ყარსის ხელშეკრულება, Armenian: Կարսի պայմանագիր, romanized: Karsi paymanagir, Azerbaijani: Qars müqaviləsi) was a treaty that established the borders between Turkey and the three Transcaucasian Soviet republics, which are now the independent republics of Armenia, Georgia and Azerbaijan. The treaty was signed in the city of Kars on 13 October 1921.

Signatories of the Treaty of Kars included representatives from the Grand National Assembly of Turkey, which would declare the Republic of Turkey in 1923, and from the Armenian, Azerbaijani and Georgian Socialist Soviet Republics with the participation of the Russian Soviet Federative Socialist Republic. The last four parties would become constituent parts of the Soviet Union after the victory of the Bolsheviks in the Russian Civil War and the December 1922 Union Treaty.

The treaty was the successor treaty to the March 1921 Treaty of Moscow, and the December 1920 Treaty of Alexandropol. Most of the territories ceded to Turkey in the treaty had previously been acquired by Imperial Russia from the Ottoman Empire during the Russo-Turkish War of 1877–1878. The only exception was the Surmalu region, which had been part of the Erivan Khanate of Qajar Iran before it was annexed by Russia in the Treaty of Turkmenchay after the Russo-Persian War of 1826–1828.

== Signatories ==
The treaty was signed by the Turkish Provisional Government Representative General Kâzım Karabekir, MP and Commander of Eastern Front Veli Bey, MP Mouhtar Bey, and Ambassador Memduh Şevket Pasha, Soviet Russian Ambassador Yakov Ganetsky, Soviet Armenian Minister of Foreign Affairs Askanaz Mravyan and Minister of Interior Poghos Makintsyan, Soviet Azerbaijani Minister of State Control Behboud Shahtahtinsky, and Soviet Georgian Minister of Military and Naval Affairs Shalva Eliava and Minister of Foreign Affairs and Financial Affairs Alexander Svanidze.

== Terms ==
The Treaty of Kars reaffirmed the terms of the earlier Treaty of Moscow concluded in 1921 between the Grand National Assembly of Turkey and Soviet Russia. It defined the boundaries between the new Turkish Republic and all three Transcaucasian republics.

=== Georgia and Adjara ===
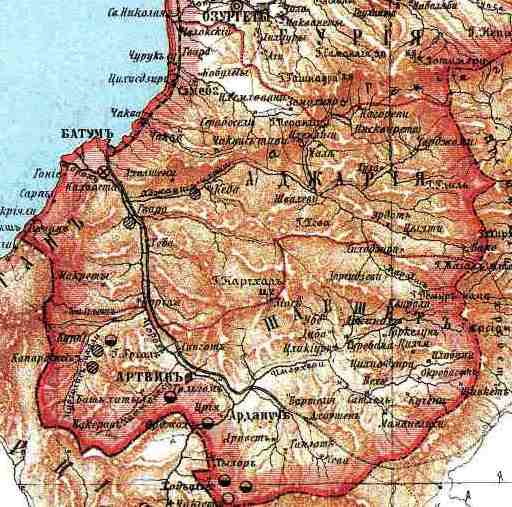
Tsarist-era Batum oblast

The treaty provided for the territory of the former Imperial Russian Batum oblast to be divided. The southern half of the former oblast, largely corresponding to the Artvin okrug with the city of Artvin, would be annexed to Turkey. The northern half, largely corresponding to the Batum okrug with the strategic port city of Batum, would become part of Soviet Georgia as the Adjar ASSR (today Adjara). The treaty required the region to be granted political autonomy because of the largely-Muslim local population and for it to implement "an agrarian system in conformity with its own wishes." Caucasus scholar Charles King referred to that part of the treaty as a "rare instance in international law in which the internal administrative structure of one country has been secured by a treaty with another." Additionally, the treaty guaranteed "free transit through the port of Batum for commodities and all materials destined for, or originating in, Turkey, without customs duties and charges, and with the right for Turkey to utilize the port of Batum without special charges."

=== Armenian–Turkish border ===
The treaty created a new boundary between Turkey and Soviet Armenia, defined by the Akhuryan (Arpachay) and Aras rivers. Turkey obtained the former Kars oblast, including the cities of Kars, Ardahan, and Oltu, Lake Çıldır, and the ruins of Ani. From the former Erivan Governorate, it also obtained the Surmalu uezd, with Mount Ararat, the salt mines of Kulp (Tuzluca), and the town of Igdyr, as well as the Aras-Kara-su corridor, a narrow strip of territory between the Aras and Kara-su Rivers that had been part of the Erivan uezd.

The Bolsheviks attempted to renegotiate the status of Ani and Kulp and to retain them as part of Soviet Armenia. According to Simon Vratsian, Ganetsky emphasised the "great historical and scientific value" of Ani for the Armenians and declared Kulp to be an "inseparable part of Transcaucasia." However, Turkey refused to renegotiate the terms agreed upon in the Treaty of Moscow, "much to the disappointment of the Soviet side." Most of the Armenian territories ceded to Turkey had already been under Turkish military control since the Turkish invasion of Armenia in 1920. The Kars treaty required Turkish troops to withdraw from an area roughly corresponding to the western half of Armenia's present-day Shirak Province, including the city of Aleksandropol (Gyumri).

=== Azerbaijan and Nakhchivan ===
Article V of the treaty established the region of Nakhchivan as an autonomous territory under the protection of Azerbaijan. The new autonomous Nakhchivan territory comprised the former Nakhichevan uezd, the Sharur section of the Sharur-Daralayaz uezd and the southernmost parts of the Erivan uezd of the former Erivan Governorate. In 1924, the area was officially declared as the Nakhichevan ASSR subordinate to the Azerbaijan SSR. The creation of the new autonomous republic allowed Azerbaijan to share a 18 km boundary with the Aras-Kara-su corridor, which was now controlled by Turkey.

== Impact on Turkish–Iranian relations ==
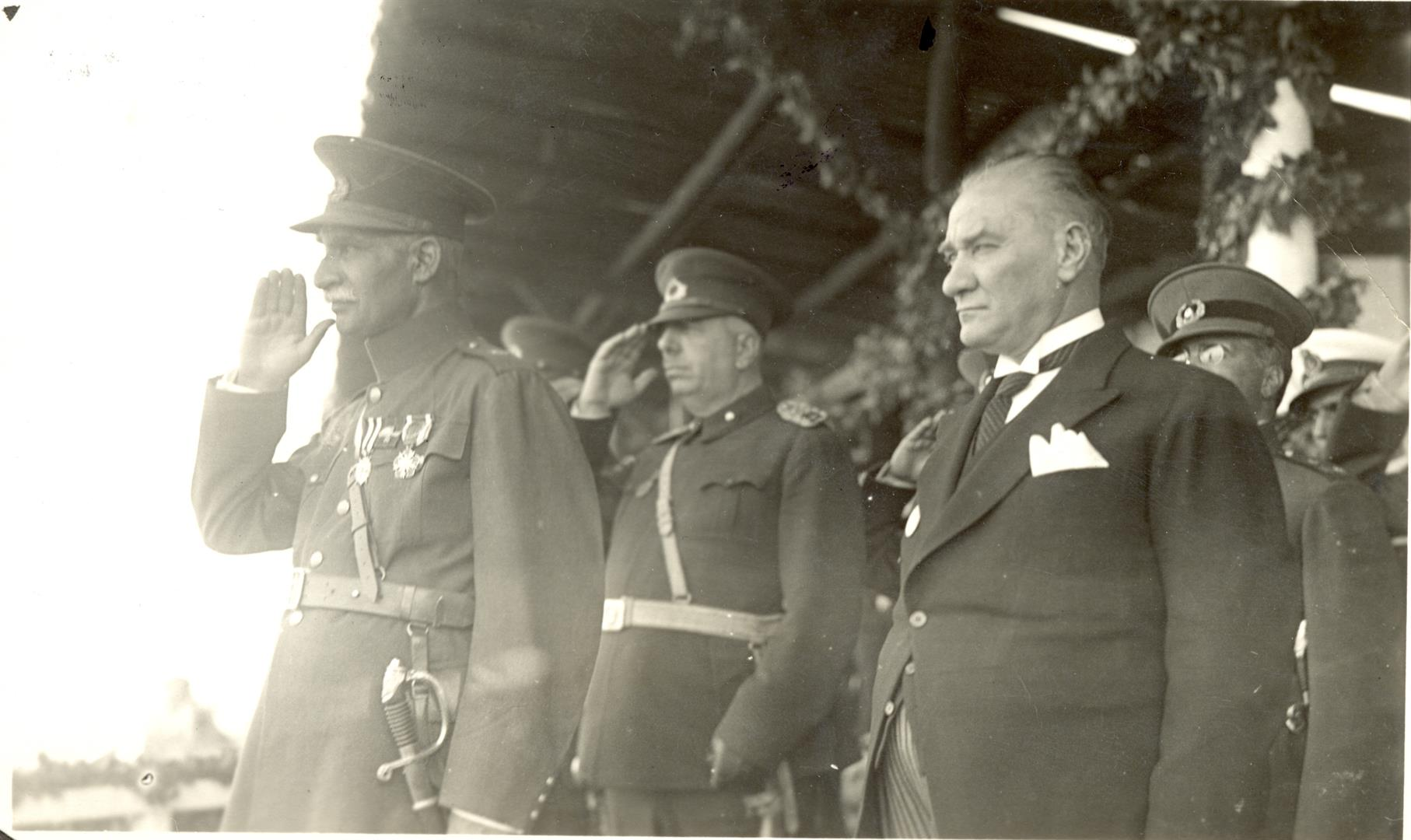
Reza Shah and Mustafa Kemal Atatürk

The Kars treaty also impacted Iran–Turkey relations. The annexation of the formerly Iranian district of Surmalu (until the Treaty of Turkmenchay of 1828) and the Aras-Kara-su corridor now gave Turkey a slightly more extensive border with Iran. In the late 1920s, the Ararat rebellion erupted in the vicinity of Mount Ararat. As Turkey attempted to quash the rebellion, the Kurdish rebels fled across the Iranian border to the eastern flank of Lesser Ararat, which they used "as a haven against the state in their uprising." In response, Turkey crossed the border with Iran and occupied the region. The Lesser Ararat area became the subject of discussion between Turkish and Iranian diplomats in border delineation talks. In Tehran in 1932, Iran agreed to cede the area to Turkey in exchange for certain territories further south.

However, the agreement was delayed by objections from some Iranian diplomats, who viewed the Lesser Ararat area as strategically important and questioned the validity of the Treaty of Kars. The diplomats felt that Turkey did not have a legitimate claim to the territory of Surmalu, which had been part of Iran before it was ceded to Imperial Russia by the Treaty of Turkmenchay. In addition, because the wording of the Turkmenchay Treaty was vague, they advocated annexing parts of the area. After a constructive meeting with Mustafa Kemal Atatürk in Ankara in 1934, Reza Shah, who initially wanted to annex the Aras-Kara-su corridor, finally ordered his diplomats to drop any objections and to accept the new border agreements.

== Attempted annulment by the Soviet Union ==
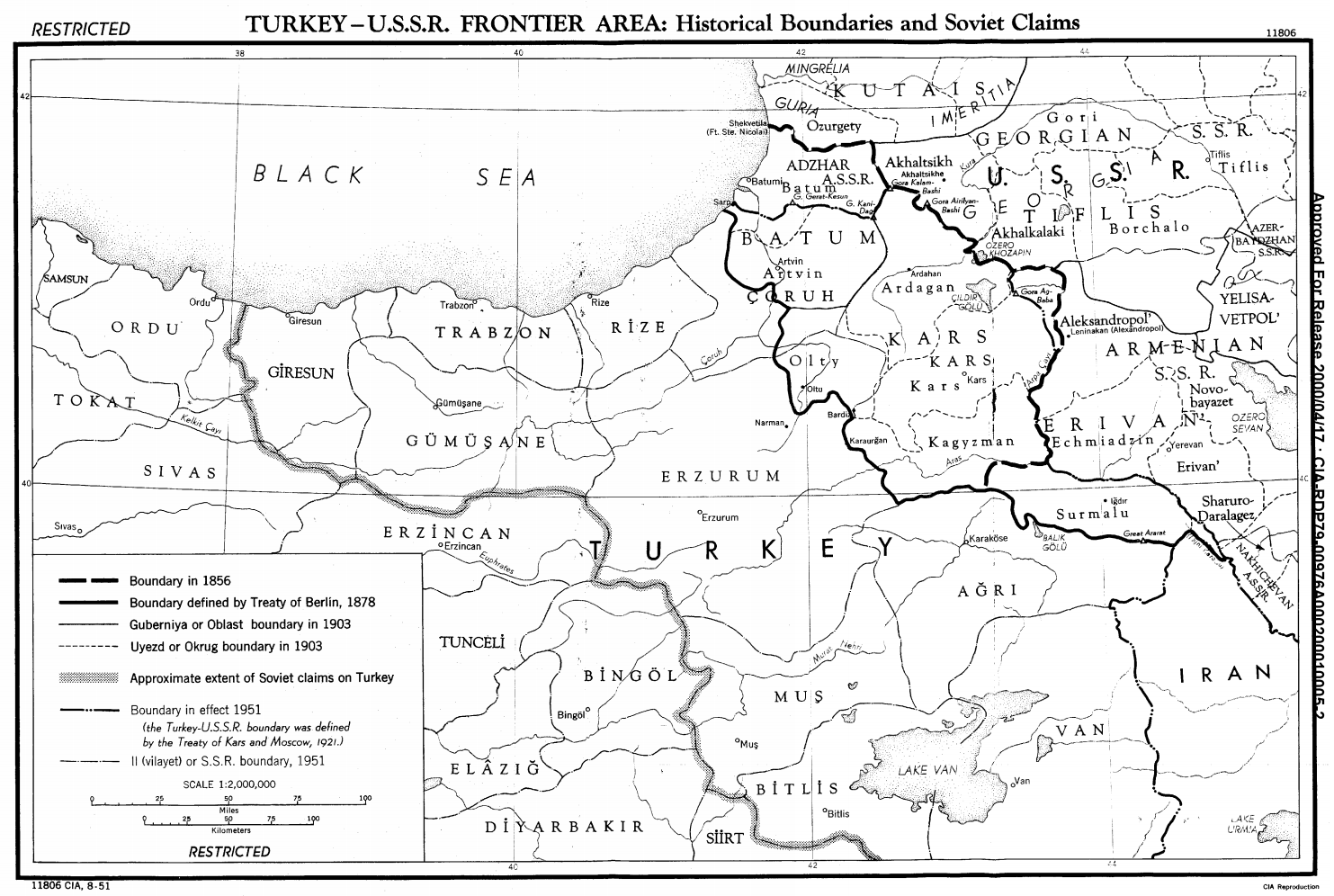
CIA map of the Soviet-Turkish frontier area

After World War II, the Soviet Union attempted to annul the treaty and to regain its lost territory. According to Nikita Khrushchev, Deputy Premier Lavrentiy Beria goaded his fellow Georgian Joseph Stalin into taking action on the issue, insisting on the return of historical Georgian territories. Stalin eventually agreed, and on 7 June 1945, Soviet Foreign Minister Vyacheslav Molotov informed the Turkish ambassador in Moscow that the provinces of Kars, Ardahan and Artvin should be returned to the Soviet Union in the name of both the Georgian and the Armenian Socialist Soviet Republics. Ankara found itself in a difficult position since it wanted good relations with Moscow but refused to give up the territories. Turkey was in no condition to fight a war with the Soviet Union, which had emerged as a superpower after the Second World War. Soviet territorial claims to Turkey were supported by the Armenian Catholicos George VI and by all shades of the Armenian diaspora, including the anti-Soviet Armenian Revolutionary Federation (ARF). The Soviet government also encouraged Armenians abroad to repatriate to Soviet Armenia to support its claims.

The British and the Americans opposed the Soviet territorial claims against Turkey. As the Cold War began, the American government saw the claims as part of an "expansionist drive by a Communist empire" and viewed them as reminiscent of Nazi irredentist designs over the Sudetenland in Czechoslovakia. The US State Department was concerned about the strategic military significance of the Kars Plateau to the Soviets. They concluded that their earlier support for Armenia since President Woodrow Wilson (1913–1921) had expired since the loss of Armenian independence. The Soviet Union also requested a revision of the Montreux Convention and a military base on the Turkish straits. The State Department advised US President Harry Truman to support Turkey and to oppose the Soviet demands, which he did. Turkey joined the anti-Soviet NATO military alliance in 1952.

Following the death of Stalin in 1953, the Soviet government renounced its territorial claims on Turkey as part of an effort to improve relations with the Middle Eastern country and its alliance partner, the United States. The Soviet Union continued to honor the terms of the treaty until its dissolution in 1991. However, according to Christopher J. Walker, Moscow revisited the treaty in 1968, when it attempted to negotiate a border adjustment with Turkey in which the ruins of Ani would be transferred to Soviet Armenia in exchange for "one or two Azeri villages in the region of Mount Akbaba." However, according to Walker, nothing resulted from these talks.

== History since 1991 ==
=== Position of Armenia ===
After the dissolution of the USSR, the post-Soviet governments of Russia, Georgia and Azerbaijan accepted the Kars treaty. Armenia's position is different due to the absence of diplomatic relations between Turkey and Armenia. In December 2006, Armenian Foreign Minister Vartan Oskanian said that Armenia accepts the treaty as the legal successor to the Armenian SSR but noted that Turkey did not adhere to the terms of the treaty. Specifically, Article XVII called for the "free transit of persons and commodities without any hindrance" among the signatories and that the parties would take "all the measures necessary to maintain and develop as quickly as possible railway, telegraphic, and other communications." However, amid the conflict over Nagorno-Karabakh, Turkey joined Azerbaijan's full transportation and economic blockade against Armenia and severed diplomatic ties with Yerevan, thus violating that article. Oskanian stated that with these steps, Ankara was putting the validity of the treaty into doubt.

=== Position of the Armenian Revolutionary Federation ===
The Treaty of Kars is overtly rejected by the ARF which specifically condemns the treaty as a "gross violation of international law" and argues that because the three Transcaucasian republics were under the control of Moscow in 1921, their independent consent was questionable. The ARF also contends that the Grand National Assembly of Turkey had no legal authority to sign international treaties. In addition, they argue that because the Soviet Union was not founded until 1922, it was not a recognized state and so also was "not a subject of international law and, naturally, its government had no authority to enter into international treaties."

=== Aftermath of the 2015 Russian Sukhoi Su-24 shootdown ===
Following the shootdown of the Russian Sukhoi Su-24 over the Syria–Turkey border in November 2015, members of the Communist Party of the Russian Federation (CPRF) proposed annulling the Treaty of Moscow and, by extension, the Treaty of Kars. Initially, the Russian Foreign Ministry considered that action to send a political message to the government of Turkish President Recep Tayyip Erdoğan. However, Moscow ultimately decided against it in its effort to de-escalate tensions with Ankara.

=== Status of Nakhchivan ===
Following spillover of the 2026 Iran war into the Nakhchivan Autonomous Republic, Azerbaijani President Ilham Aliyev approved new amendments to Azerbaijan's constitution that would "drastically curtail" the autonomy of Nakhchivan. In addition, the exclave's constitution was amended to remove all references to the 1921 Kars and Moscow treaties, both of which "clearly defined Nakhchivan's borders and autonomy."

== See also ==
- Aftermath of World War I
- Soviet Union–Turkey relations

== Bibliography ==
- Bournoutian, George A. (2015). "The Iran-Turkey-Armenia Borders as Depicted in Various Maps". Iran and the Caucasus. 19 (1): 97–107. doi:10.1163/1573384X-20150108.
- Gromyko, Andrei A., ed. (1960). Документы внешней политики СССР: 19 марта 1921 г.–31 декабря 1921 г. (in Russian). Vol. 4. Moscow: Госполитиздат.
- Hewsen, Robert H. (2001). Armenia: A Historical Atlas. Chicago: University of Chicago Press. ISBN 978-0-226-33228-4.
- Hovannisian, Richard G. (1996b). The Republic of Armenia. Vol. 4: Between Crescent and Sickle: Partition and Sovietization. Berkeley: University of California Press. ISBN 978-0520088047.
- Khrushchev, Nikita S. (2006). Sergei Khrushchev (ed.). Memoirs of Nikita Khrushchev: Reformer, 1945–1964. Vol. 2. Translated by George Shriver. University Park, PA: Penn State University Press. ISBN 978-0271058597.
- King, Charles (2008). The Ghost of Freedom: A History of the Caucasus. Oxford: Oxford University Press. ISBN 978-0195177756.
- Panossian, Razmik (2006). The Armenians: From Kings and Priests to Merchants and Commissars. New York: Columbia University Press. ISBN 978-0231139267.
- Rieber, Alfred J. (2015). Stalin and the Struggle for Supremacy in Eurasia. Cambridge: Cambridge University Press. ISBN 978-1107426443.
- Shakarian, Pietro A. (2025). Anastas Mikoyan: An Armenian Reformer in Khrushchev's Kremlin. Bloomington: Indiana University Press. ISBN 978-0253073556.
- Suny, Ronald Grigor (1993). Looking toward Ararat. Bloomington: Indiana University Press. ISBN 978-0253207739.
- Tsutsiev, Arthur (2014). Atlas of the Ethno-Political History of the Caucasus (PDF). Translated by Nora Seligman Favorov. New Haven: Yale University Press. ISBN 9780300153088. Archived (PDF) from the original on 17 June 2023.
- Vrastian, Simon (1949). "How Armenia Was Sovietized, (Part V)". The Armenian Review. 2 (1).
- Walker, Christopher J. (1990). Armenia: The Survival of a Nation (2nd ed.). New York: St. Martin's Press. ISBN 978-0312042301.
- Yildiz, Kerim; Taysi, Tanyel B. (2007). The Kurds in Iran: The Past, Present and Future. London: Pluto Press. ISBN 978-0745326696.
