= Veli Bey =

Veli Bey is the name of several Ottoman Beys (Lords):

- Veli Bey of Tepelena (fl. 18th century), Albanian clan leader, father of Ali Pasha of Ioannina
- Veli Kelcyra (1862–1924), Albanian nationalist
- Veli Saltikgil (1880–1935), Turkish general and politician, signatory of the Treaty of Kars
