= Khoren I =

Khoren I was the name of

- Khoren I Muradbekyan, Catholicos of All Armenians (1873–1938)
- Khoren I Paroian, Catholicos of Cilicia (1914–1983)
