= Gevorg V of Armenia =

Patriarch of the Armenian Apostolic Church (1911–1930)

His Holiness George V of Armenia Գևորգ Ե Սուրենյանց
- Supreme Patriarch and Catholicos of All Armenians
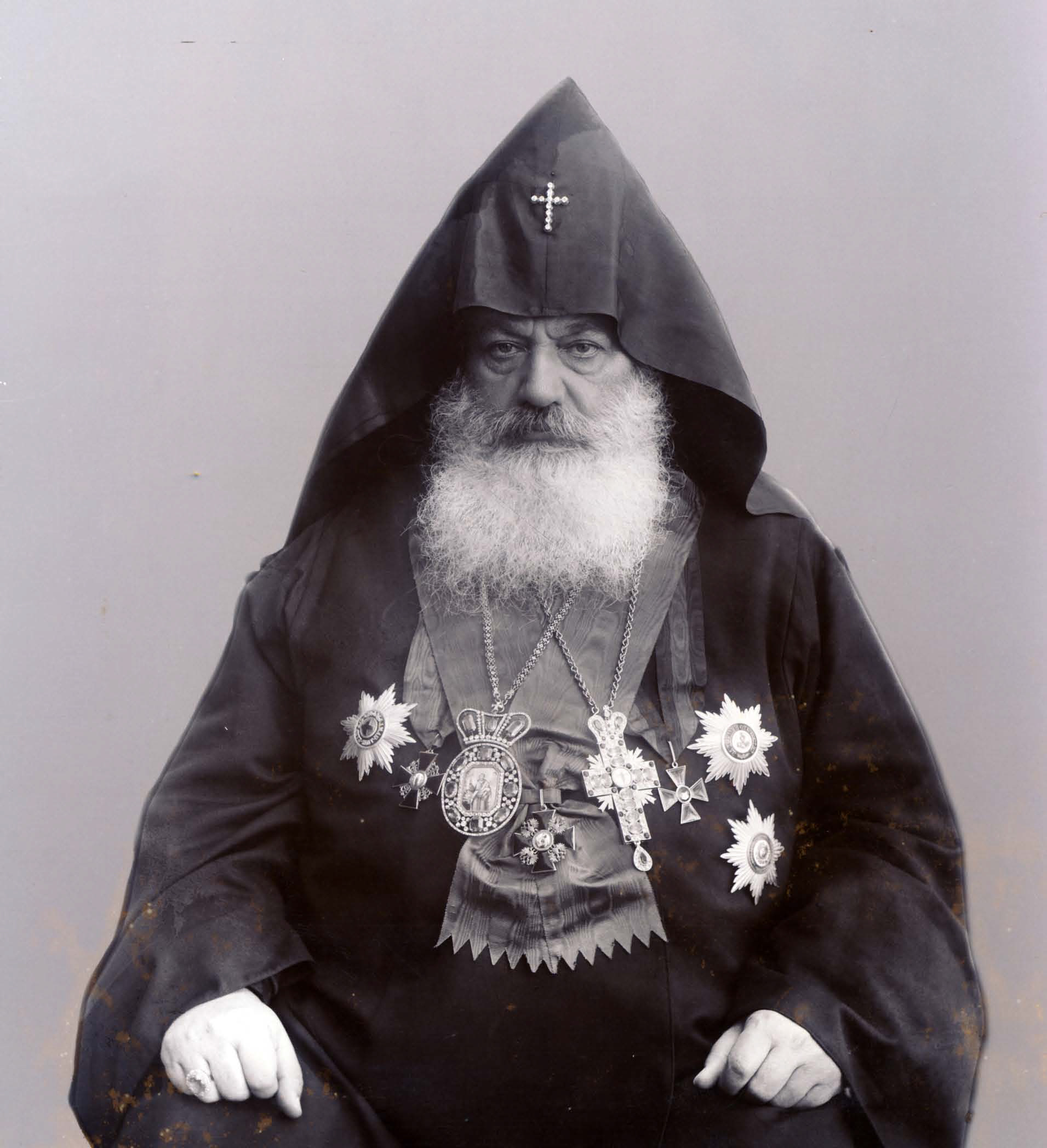
- Church: Armenian Apostolic Church
- See: Mother See of Holy Etchmiadzin
- Installed: 1911
- Term ended: 1930
- Predecessor: Matthew II of Armenia
- Successor: Vacant (1930–1932) followed by Khoren I of Armenia

Personal details
- Born: Gevorg Surenyants; 28 August 1847 Tiflis, Tiflis Governorate, Russian Empire
- Died: 8 May 1930 (aged 82) Etchmiadzin, Armenian SSR, Soviet Union
- Buried: Mother Cathedral of Holy Etchmiadzin

Gevorg V of Armenia (Armenian: Գևորգ Ե. Սուրենյանց (Տփղիսեցի) (28 August 1847 – 8 May 1930) was the Catholicos of All Armenians of the Armenian Apostolic Church in the Mother See of Holy Etchmiadzin from 1911–1930. He succeeded Catholicos Matthew II (in Armenian Մատթեոս Բ Կոստանդնուպոլսեց), who had died on 11 December 1910 after less than three years as Catholicos.

== Biography ==
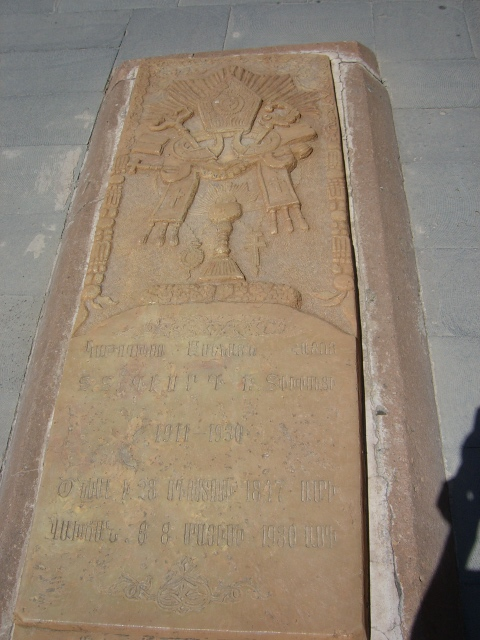
Tomb of Gevorg V near the entrance of Echmiadzin

Born in Tiflis, he studied between 1865 and 1868 at the classical gymnasium in his hometown and in 1872 was consecrated as a priest (vartabed) in the Armenian Apostolic Church and consecrated as bishop in 1882. In 1874, he taught at the Gevorkian Theological Seminary in Etchmiadzin, until his appointment the following year as bishop of Artsakh (present-day Karabakh) and later as assistant prelate in Alexandropol (present-day Gyumri) in 1878 and in Yerevan in 1881. He was assigned prelate and bishop of Astrakhan, Russia in 1886 and Armenian prelate of Georgia in 1894.

In 1907, he was assigned as assistant to the Catholicossate in Mother See of Holy Etchmiadzin and elected Catholicos of All Armenians in December 1911, a post he held for three decades until 1930.

In October 1912, he advocated Russian intervention for Turkish Armenians. He was active in Armenian political affairs at very critical times and was part of the Armenian delegation headed by Boghos Nubar Pasha. He also organized relief efforts for the survivors of the Armenian genocide. He presided over the Aid Committee for Armenian victims, refugees and wounded soldiers and their families. Aid was provided throughout Armenia as well as Turkey, Georgia and Russia.

He was the presiding Catholicos when the First Republic of Armenia was established in May 1918. He supported the various military campaigns, refusing to relocate the catholicosate from Etchmiadzin to a safer venue.

Catholicos of All Armenians Georeg V Surenyants's appeal to the Armenian people. May, 1918

— If the Armenian people cannot stop the advance of the enemy, if they are unable to save our sanctuaries, then I myself will take a sword and fall in the courtyard of the Mother Cathedral, but I will not leave the Holy See, which was left as a deposit by our grandpas.

With the establishment of the Armenian Soviet Socialist Republic in 1920–1921 and the Transcaucasian Socialist Federative Soviet Republic in 1922 made up of Armenia, Georgia and Azerbaijan, he refused to leave the position and encouraged the Armenian population to cooperate with the new regime installed as an alternative safe haven for Armenians.

He was also actively involved in building new churches in the Armenian diaspora, developing a network of religious institutions and schools and for admitting the four-voice religious music of composer Makar Yekmalyan into the church Mass.

George V died at Etchmiadzin, Armenian Soviet Socialist Republic, in 1930 and is buried near Mother Cathedral of Holy Etchmiadzin in the Catholicosate complex.

After his death, the Armenian Church as well as all organized religions in the Soviet Union became subject to persecution and rigid control, particularly through Joseph Stalin's orders. No new catholicos was elected for 2 years as the throne remained vacant from 1930 to 1932. However, when Stalin temporarily eased the pressure, the time was opportune for the election of a bishop Khoren Muratbekyan as new Catholicos of All Armenians as Khoren I of Armenia (Armenian: Խորեն Ա Տփղիսեցի Մուրադբեկյան).

== Awards ==
- Order of Saint Alexander Nevsky

Preceded by Matthew II of Armenia	Catholicoi of the Mother See of Holy Echmiadzin and All Armenians; 1911–1930	Succeeded by Vacant position (1930–1932) followed by Khoren I of Armenia
