= Armash, Ottoman Empire =

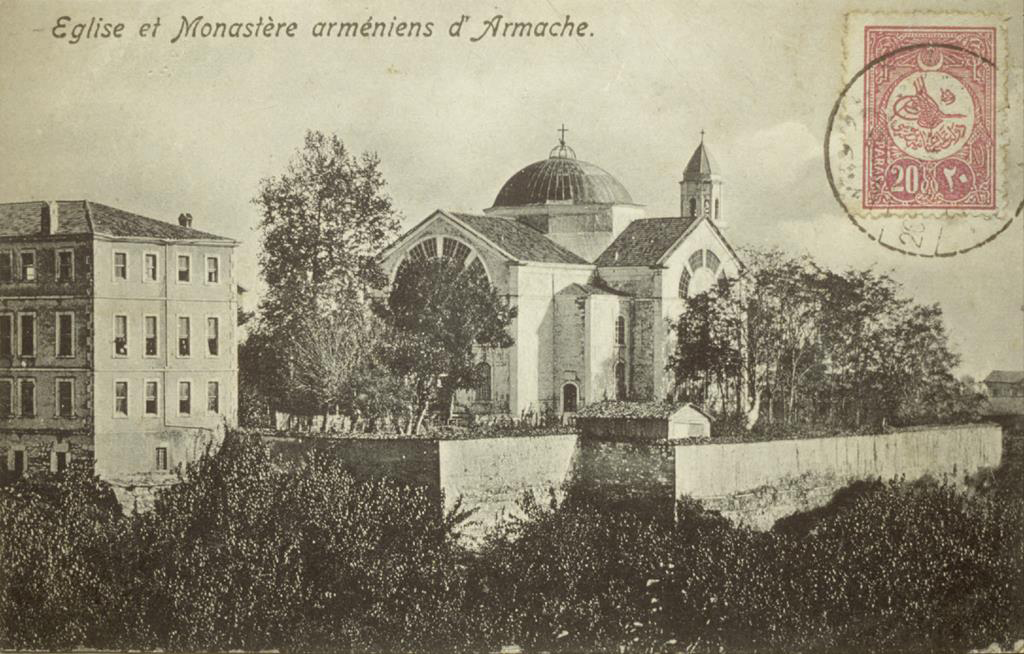
The Armenian Monastery and Seminary of Armash

Armash (Armenian: Արմաշ) was a small Armenian-populated town located in the Ottoman Empire, near the Sea of Marmara. With its seminary and monastery of Charkhapan Surb Astvatsatsin (Warder-off-of-Evil, Holy Mother of God), Armash served as the spiritual center of Armenians in western Asia Minor until 1915, when its inhabitants were rounded up and sent on death marches to the Syrian desert by orders of the leaders of the Committee of Union and Progress party.

== History ==
Founded in 1611 by Armenian families fleeing from the Jelali revolts, Armash became the seat of the first Armenian prelate of Izmid, Bishop Markos Paron-Ter (1697–98). The Monastery of the Holy Mother of God was constructed sometime during the seventeenth century and underwent renovations in the eighteenth. In the early 1800s, church leaders also established a school and manuscript repository. The Monastery of the Holy Mother of God was burned down during the brief struggle between the Ottoman sultan and the rebellious Janissary Corps. It was rebuilt shortly thereafter.

A seminary, which was the only Armenian seminary in western Anatolia, operated adjacent to the monastery. Among other secondary schools, the seminary of Armash was considered one of the most outstanding Armenian institutions in the Ottoman Empire. Patriarch of Constantinople Malachia Ormanian and Patriarchate of Jerusalem Yeghishe Tourian both served as deans of the seminary.

Despite recurring political upheavals within Ottoman society toward the end of the nineteenth century that impeded the operation of the Armash monastery, in the decade prior to the first World War the Holy Mother of God church remained a popular destination of Armenian pilgrimage, where visitors sought to view its Italian painting of the Holy Virgin Mary, which was thought to heal the ailments of believers. The Armash compound hosted numerous live peacocks, an ancient symbol of divine immortality and the all-seeing eye of providence, as well as a flock of small chickens and pigeons. Many of these were offerings of thanksgiving for the healing blessing of the Holy Mother.

== Destruction ==
During the Armenian genocide, Armash's Armenian population was rounded up by Ottoman authorities and sent on death marches to Syria. The seminary was looted of its priceless artifacts and the Monastery of the Holy Mother of God was demolished and later replaced with a mosque. According to Vrej Nersessian, a great number of graduates from the monastery who "had become the primates or diocesan bishops in the provinces of Turkish Armenia" also perished during the death marches. Several seminarians who survived were brought to Jerusalem, where they helped establish a new theological school on the grounds of the Armenian Quarter.

Other than some crumbled foundations, little remains of the Armash seminary compound today except for a four-sided stone fountain dating from 1827. Water from this block structure, known as the Fountain of Light, was originally dedicated to the enlightenment of all people.
