= Malachia Ormanian =

Armenian Patriarch of Constantinople from 1896 to 1908

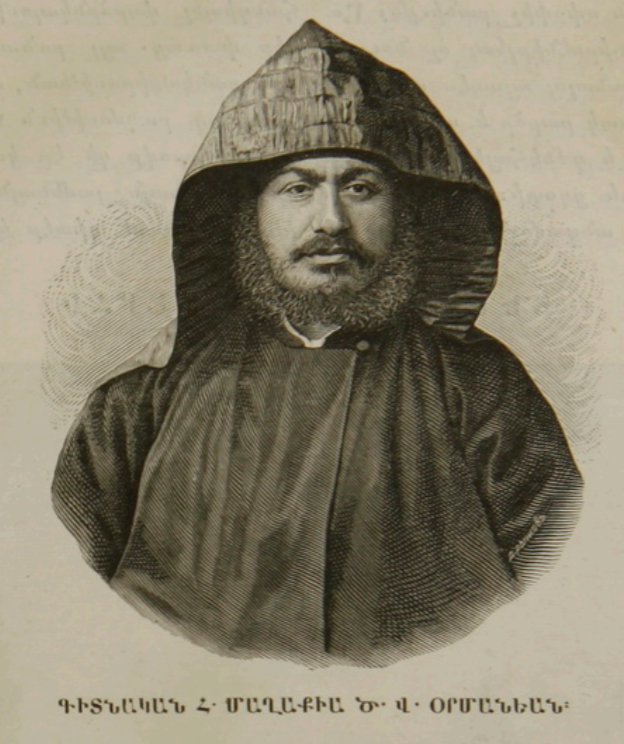
Malachia Ormanian

Malachia Ormanian (Armenian: Մաղաքիա Օրմանեան, romanized: Maghak’ia Ormanean; 11 February 1841 – 19 November 1918) was the Armenian Patriarch of Constantinople from 1896 to 1908. He was also a theologian, historian, and philologist.

== Life ==
Boghos Ormanian (baptismal name), originated from an Armenian Catholic family. He joined the Armenian Catholic Church, then studied in Rome, serving as an Armenian teacher to The Sacred Congregation de Propaganda Fide and was present at First Vatican Council. In 1879, he left the Armenian Catholic Church and was accepted as a priest in the Armenian Apostolic Church. By 1880, he was Primate of the Armenians in Erzerum. On 8 June 1886, he was arrested in Vagharshapat. From 1888 to 1896, he was head of the Armenian Seminary of Armash near Izmit, following the forced resignation of Patriarch Matheos III.

Ormanian was elected as Patriarch of Constantinople, of the Armenian Orthodox Church, on 6 November 1896, following the forced resignation of his predecessor by the Ottoman authorities. In January 1903 he was wounded in the shoulder in an attack by an assailant during mass. He was removed in 1908 due to pressure from the Armenian Assembly and suffered a stroke. Following his rehabilitation, he worked for 2 years in Jerusalem, where the Patriarch chair was vacant, apparently hoping for the appointment. In November 1917, he was deported to Damascus and by May 1918 moved to Constantinople, where he died a few months later.

== Writings ==
Ormanian is best remembered for his history of the Armenian Church, which Vrej Nersessian described as "the most authoritative history of the Church of Armenia [...] characterized not only by extensive and accurate knowledge but by a sympathetic understanding of contrasting and different points of view, and by genuine religious insight."

- Hayotsʻ ekeghetsʻin : ew ir patmutʻiwnĕ, vardapetutʻiwnĕ, araroghutʻiwnĕ, grakanutʻiwnĕ, u nerkay katsʻutʻiwnĕ Հայոց եկեղեցին եւ իր պատմութիւնը, վարդապետութիւնը, վարչութիւնը, բարեկարգութիւնը, արարողութիւնը, գրականութիւն, ու ներկայ կացութիւնը (in Armenian). Constantinople. 1911. (View online.)
  - English publication: The Church of Armenia: her history, doctrine, rule, discipline, liturgy, literature, and existing condition. 1st ed. Oxford (view online), 2nd. ed. Mowbray, London 1955; 3. ed Mowbray, London 1955; 3rd ed. St. Vartan Press, New York 1988. ed St. Vartan Press, New York 1988.
- Azgapatum (Ազգապատում, "National History"). 3 Bde., Tp. S. Jakobean, Jerusalem 1913-27, 2. 3 vols, Tp. P. Jakobean, Jerusalem 1913-27, 2 Aufl. Beirut 1959, Neuauflage Etschmiadsin 2001 Aufl Beirut in 1959, reprint Etschmiadsin 2001
- Ծիսական Բառարան, Մաղաքիա արքեպիսկոպոս Օրմանեան։ Կաթողիկոսութիւն Հայոց Մեծի Տանն Կիլիկիոյ, Անթիլիաս, 1979։
- A Dictionary of the Armenian Church. St. A Dictionary of the Armenian Church. St. Vartan Press, New York 1984 (Nachdruck 2006). ISBN 0-934728-12-7 Vartan Press, New York 1984 (reprint 2006). ISBN 0-934728-12-7
- Dictionary of Rituals (arm.). Hayastan Publ., Yerevan 1992. ISBN 5-540-01482-0

Religious titles
Preceded by Matdeos II	Armenian Patriarch of Constantinople; 1896–1908	Succeeded by Yeghishe Tourian
