= Gevorg VI of Armenia =

Patriarch of the Armenian Apostolic Church (1945–1954)

His Holiness Gevorg VI of Armenia Գևորգ Զ Չորեքչյան
- Supreme Patriarch and Catholicos of All Armenians
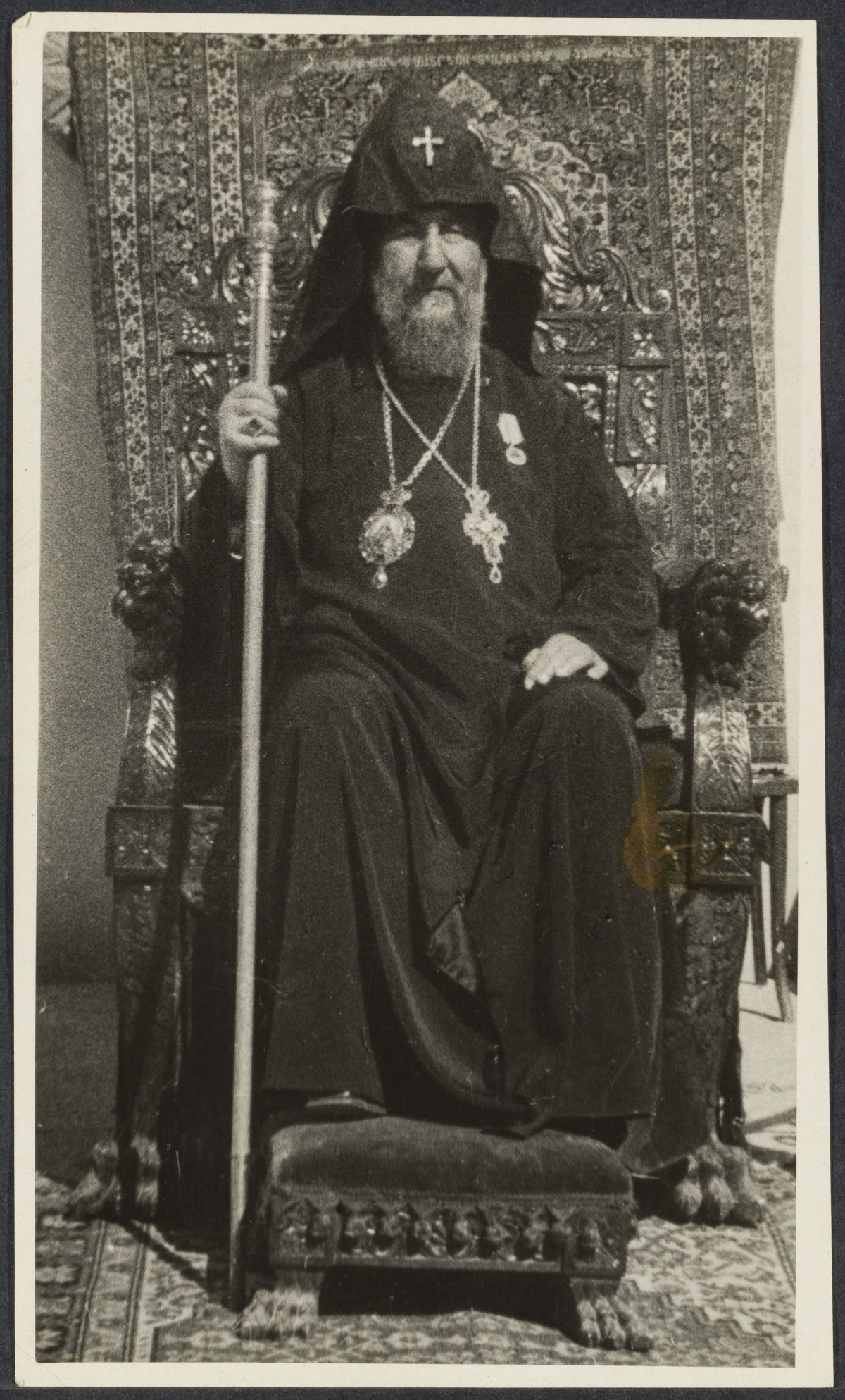
- Church: Armenian Apostolic Church
- See: Mother See of Holy Etchmiadzin
- Installed: 1945
- Term ended: 1954
- Predecessor: Khoren I of Armenia
- Successor: Vazgen I

Personal details
- Born: Georg Khachaturovich Cheorekchian (or Tcheorekdjian); December 2, 1868 Rostov-on-Don, Don Host Oblast, Russian Empire
- Died: May 9, 1954 (aged 85) Yerevan, Armenian SSR, Soviet Union
- Buried: Mother Cathedral of Holy Etchmiadzin

Gevorg VI of Armenia (Armenian: Գևորգ Զ. Չորեքչյան (Նորնախիջևանցի), Kevork VI Cheorekjian; December 2, 1868 – May 9, 1954) was the Catholicos of the Armenian Apostolic Church from 1945 to 1954.

The position had remained vacant from 1938 to 1945 following the Stalinist-era purges against organized religion, culminating in the murder of the then catholicos Khoren I in 1938. Etchmiadzin was ordered closed and the position of Catholicos of All Armenians remained vacant for seven years.

But when Stalin himself ordered the easing of restrictions against religion, it was allowed for the assignment of Bishop Gevorg as the new Catholicos of All Armenians as Gevorg VI (also known as Gevorg VI of Armenia) and was eventually allowed to return to Ejmiatsin.

During the Soviet regime, the press praised Gevorg as one of the most outstanding supporters of the "struggle for peace."

He died at his flat in Yerevan in 1954, and was succeeded by Vazgen I, who was elected in 1955 as Catholicos of All Armenians.

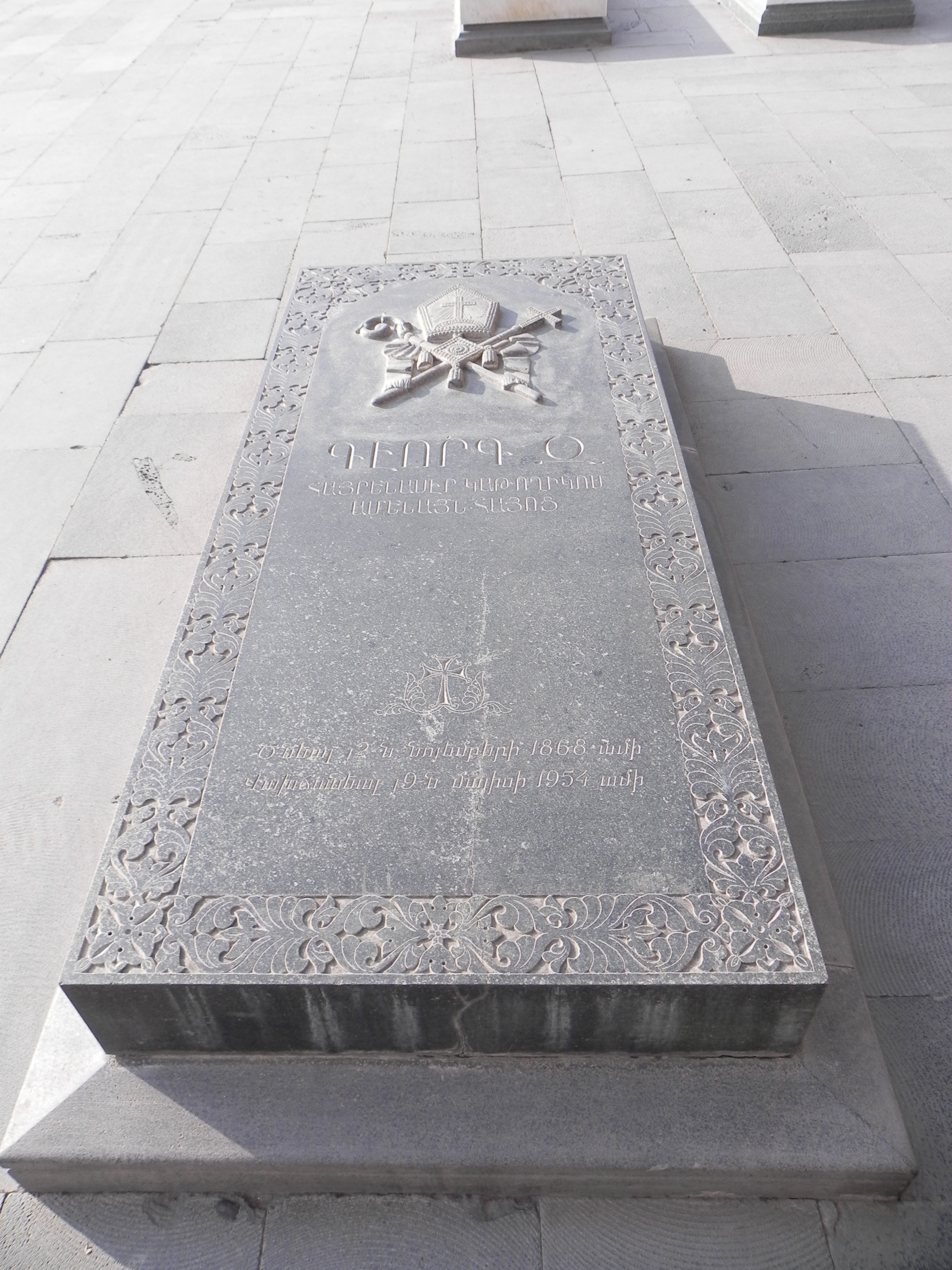
Tombstone of Gevorg VI, Catholicos of All Armenians, at the Mother Cathedral of Holy Etchmiadzin

Gevorg VI is buried near the Mother Cathedral of Holy Etchmiadzin.

== Awards ==
- Medal "For the Defense of the Caucasus"

Preceded by Khoren I of Armenia followed by Vacant position (1938–1945)	Catholicoi of the Mother See of Holy Echmiadzin and All Armenians; 1945–1954	Succeeded by Vazgen I
