= Veli Saltikgil =

Turkish general and politician (1880 – 1935)

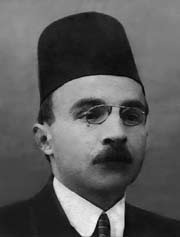
- Born: 1880; Buldan, Ottoman Empire
- Died: 21 March 1935 (aged 55); Aydın, Turkey
- Military career
- Allegiance: Ottoman Empire (1902–1919); Turkey (1919–1924)
- Service years: 1902–1924
- Rank: General
- Nickname: Veliddin
- Commands: Commander of the Eastern Front
- Conflicts: World War I Turkish War of Independence
- Other work: Member of the TBMM (Aydın)

Veli Saltikgil (1880 – 21 March 1935), also known as Veli Bey and Veliddin, was a Turkish general and politician. He was the commander of the Eastern Army of Turkey & a signatory of the Treaty of Kars, he later served in the justice department in Aydın, he was a member of the Grand National Assembly of Turkey.

== See also ==
- Treaty of Kars
