= Matthew II Izmirlian =

Armenian Apostolic Catholicos from 1908 to 1910

His Holiness Matteos II of Armenia Մատթէոս Բ Իզմիրլյան Supreme Patriarch and Catholicos of All Armenians
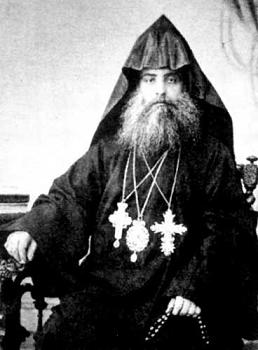
- Matthew II
- Church: Armenian Apostolic Church
- See: Mother See of Holy Etchmiadzin
- Installed: 1908
- Term ended: 1910
- Predecessor: Mkrtich I Khrimian
- Successor: George V of Armenia

Personal details
- Born: Simeon Martiros Izmirlian; February 22, 1845 Istanbul, Ottoman Empire
- Died: December 11, 1910 (aged 65) Etchmiadzin, Russian Empire
- Buried: Mother Cathedral of Holy Etchmiadzin

Matthew II Izmirlian (Armenian: Մատթէոս Բ. Կոնստանդնուպոլսեցի (Իզմիրլեան), Matthew II of Constantinople; 22 February 1845 – 11 December 1910) was the Catholicos of All Armenians of the Armenian Apostolic Church at the Mother See of Holy Etchmiadzin in 1908–1910. He succeeded Mkrtich I Khrimian (better known as Khrimian Hayrik), who reigned as Catholicos from 1892 to 1907.

== Biography ==
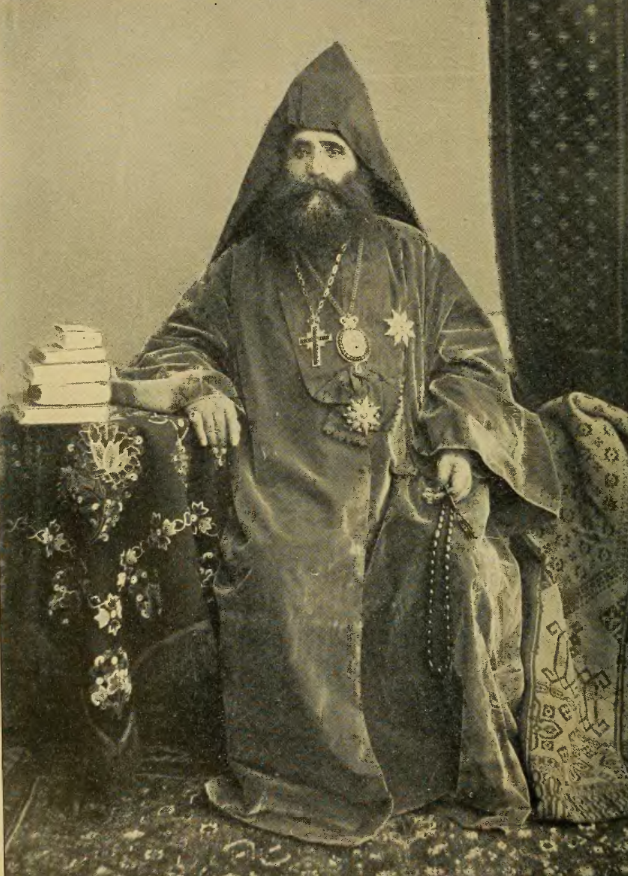

Matthew I was born in 1845 in Istanbul as Simeon Martirosi Izmirlian (Սիմէոն Մարտիրոսի Իզմիրլեան). He was ordained as priest in 1869 and served as the personal secretary to Patriarch Mkrtich Khrimian when the latter was still Armenian Patriarch of Constantinople in the early 1870s. He was elected in 1872 as secretary of the Armenian religious council of Constantinople, and raised to level of "dzayrakouyn vardapet" or supreme archimandrite in 1873 and bishop in 1876.

After a brief period as Bishop of Egypt for the Armenian Apostolic Church from 1886 to 1890, he was elected as Patriarch of Constantinople in 1894. His insistence on democratic reforms and rights of Armenians in the Ottoman Empire as well as his protest against the Hamidian massacres against the Ottoman Armenians in 1894–1896 earned him the title "Iron Patriarch."

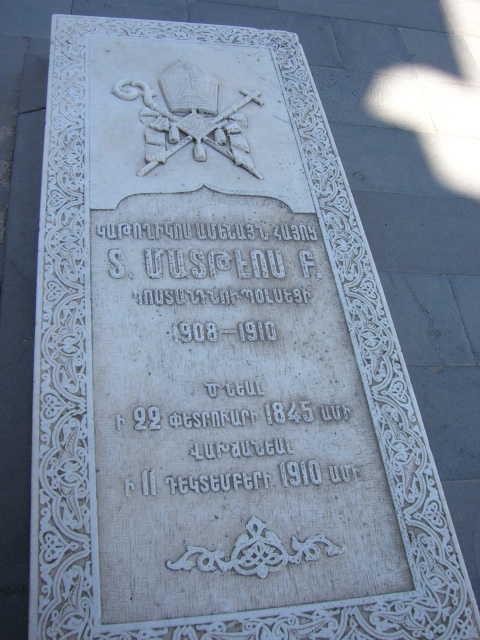
Tomb of Matthew II in Echmiadzin

Because of his activism, in 1896 the Ottoman authorities dethroned him as Armenian Patriarch of Constantinople and exiled him to Jerusalem. He returned briefly from exile in 1908 after the Committee of Union and Progress declared the restoration of the constitution in 1908 and was reelected as Patriarch of Constantinople for a few months. After the death of Catholicos Khrimian, Izmirlian was elected as Catholicos of All Armenians as Matthew II and left for Etchmiadzin for his consecration. He held the post of Catholicos of All Armenians for three years before he died. During his tenure, he became the first Catholicos to make a pilgrimage to Ani, the ruined capital of medieval Armenia.

== Scholarly legacy ==
He was also a prolific author and published extensively, including a voluminous book in 1881 on the history of the Armenian Apostolic Church and the Catholicosates of Sis and Aghtamar. In 1911, a collection of his letters (Նամականի) was published in Cairo.

Religious titles
Preceded by Khoren I of Constantinople	Armenian Patriarch of Constantinople; 1894–1896 (Deposed and exiled by the Ottomans)	Succeeded by Maghakia Ormanian
Preceded by Maghakia Ormanian	Armenian Patriarch of Constantinople; 1908–1908	Succeeded by Yeghishe Tourian
Preceded by Mkrtich I Khrimian	Catholicos of the Mother See of Holy Echmiadzin and All Armenians; 1908–1910	Succeeded by George V of Armenia
