= Etchmiadzin (magazine) =

Official magazine of the Armenian Apostolic Church

- Frequency: Monthly
- Publisher: Mother See of Holy Etchmiadzin (Armenian Apostolic Church)
- Founded: 1868 as Ararat; 1944 as Etchmiadzin
- Country: Armenia
- Language: Armenian
- Website: etchmiadzinlibrary.am/en/etchmiadzin-magazine

Etchmiadzin Journal of Religious and Armenological Studies (Armenian: «Էջմիածին» կրօնագիտական և հայագիտական ամսագիր, Ejmiatsin kronagitakan yev hayagitakan amsagir) is the official monthly publication of the Mother See of Holy Etchmiadzin of the Armenian Apostolic Church. It has been published since 1944 and is considered the continuation of the Ararat monthly that was established in 1868. It was published in Yerevan from 1944 to 1961 and has since been published in the city of Etchmiadzin (Vagharshapat). It publishes records of the Armenian Church and articles related to theology and Armenian studies.

The magazine's archives have been digitized and articles can be accessed from its website.
