= Christopher J. Walker =

British historian and author

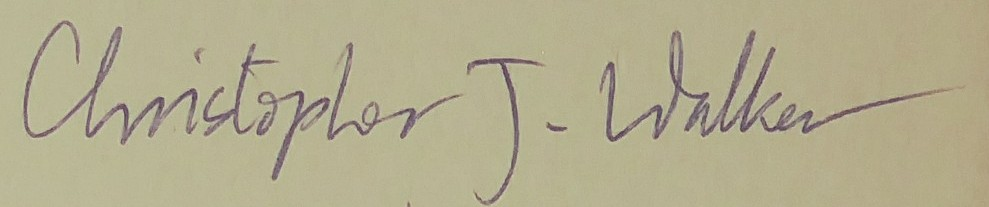
Signature of Christopher J. Walker

Christopher Joseph Walker CF (10 July 1942 – 18 April 2017) was a British historian and author.

== Life and career ==
Walker was educated at Lancing College and Brasenose College, Oxford.

He worked in Sotheby's department of historical and literary manuscripts. After winning a Winston Churchill Travelling Fellowship in 1971 he wrote a book on Armenian history which was reissued in 1990. In 1975 with the support of "Minority Rights Group" he published "The Armenians" report (co-author - prof. David Marshall Lang). In November 1989 at Oxford University Walker had a lecture on the modern history of Armenia. He also wrote several books and articles on the history of Armenia, including the book Armenia: The Survival of a Nation, which has been described as an "excellent history of Greater Armenia" and "a balanced presentation" of the events during the Armenian genocide of 1895–1918.

After a long-time research in archives, in 2003 Walker completed his book, Life of Oliver Baldwin, about a soldier, statesman, and journalist, the son of a Conservative Prime Minister, who became a Labour member of British Parliament.

== Publications ==
- The Armenians, by David Marshall Lang and Christopher J. Walker, London: Minority Rights Group, MRG Report No. 32, fifth edition, 1987
- Armenia : The Survival of a Nation, ISBN 978-0-312-04944-7, 1980; ISBN 978-0-312-04230-1, 1990
- Armenia and Karabagh: The Struggle for Unity, ISBN 978-1-873194-00-3, 1991
- Oliver Baldwin : A Life of Dissent, ISBN 978-1-900850-86-5, 2003
- Visions of Ararat (writings on Armenia), ISBN 978-1-85043-888-5, 2005
- "At History's Crossroad: The making of the Armenian nation," (The Armenians: From Kings and Priests to Merchants and Commissars) (Book review) Weekly Standard Nov 27, 2006.
- Friends or Foes? The Islamic East and the West, History Today, March 2007, Volume: 57, Issue: 3, Page 50-57

== Sources ==
- Caravans to Oblivion: The Armenian Genocide, by G. S. Graber, 1996, p. 29
