= Architecture of Armenia =

Armenian architecture
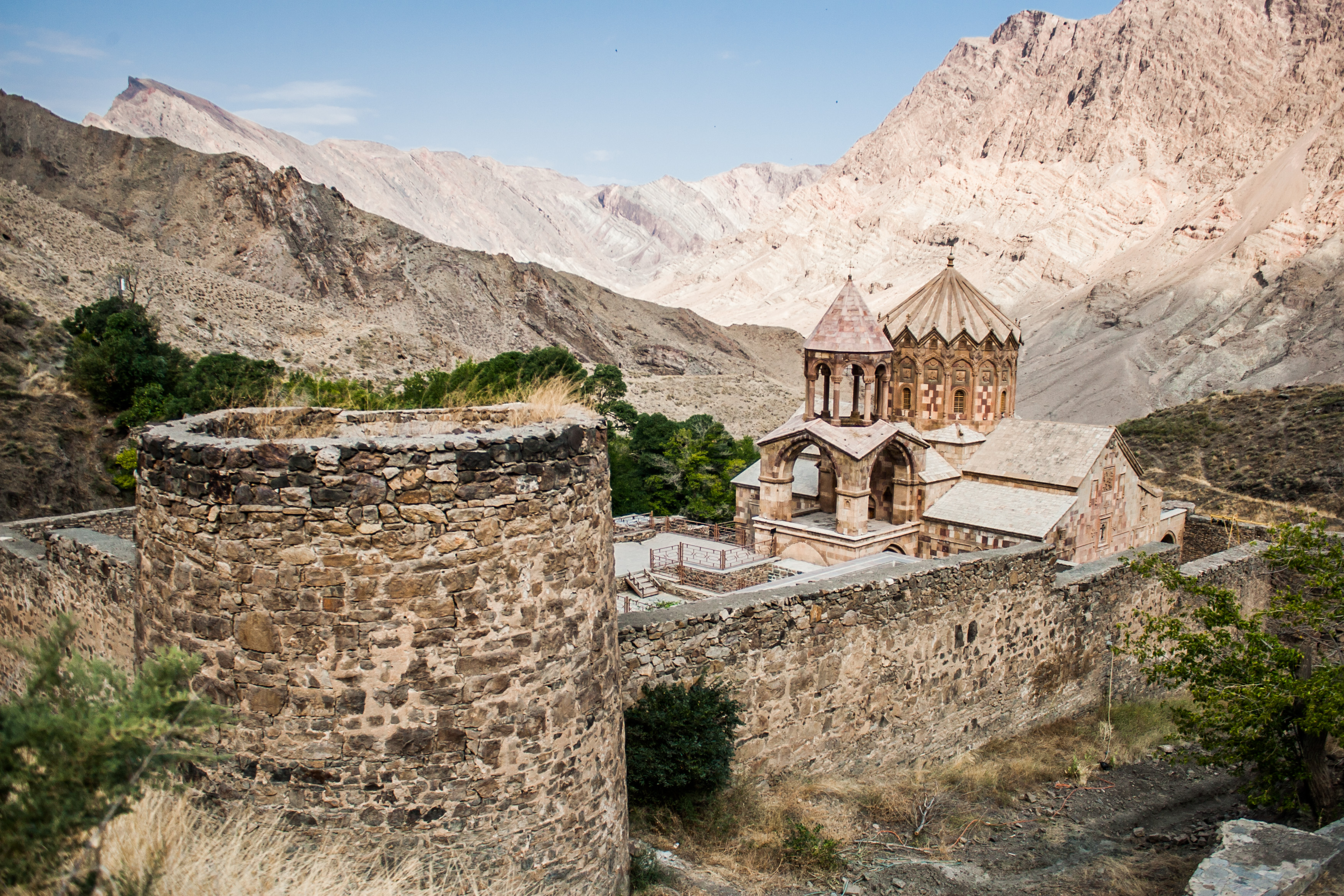
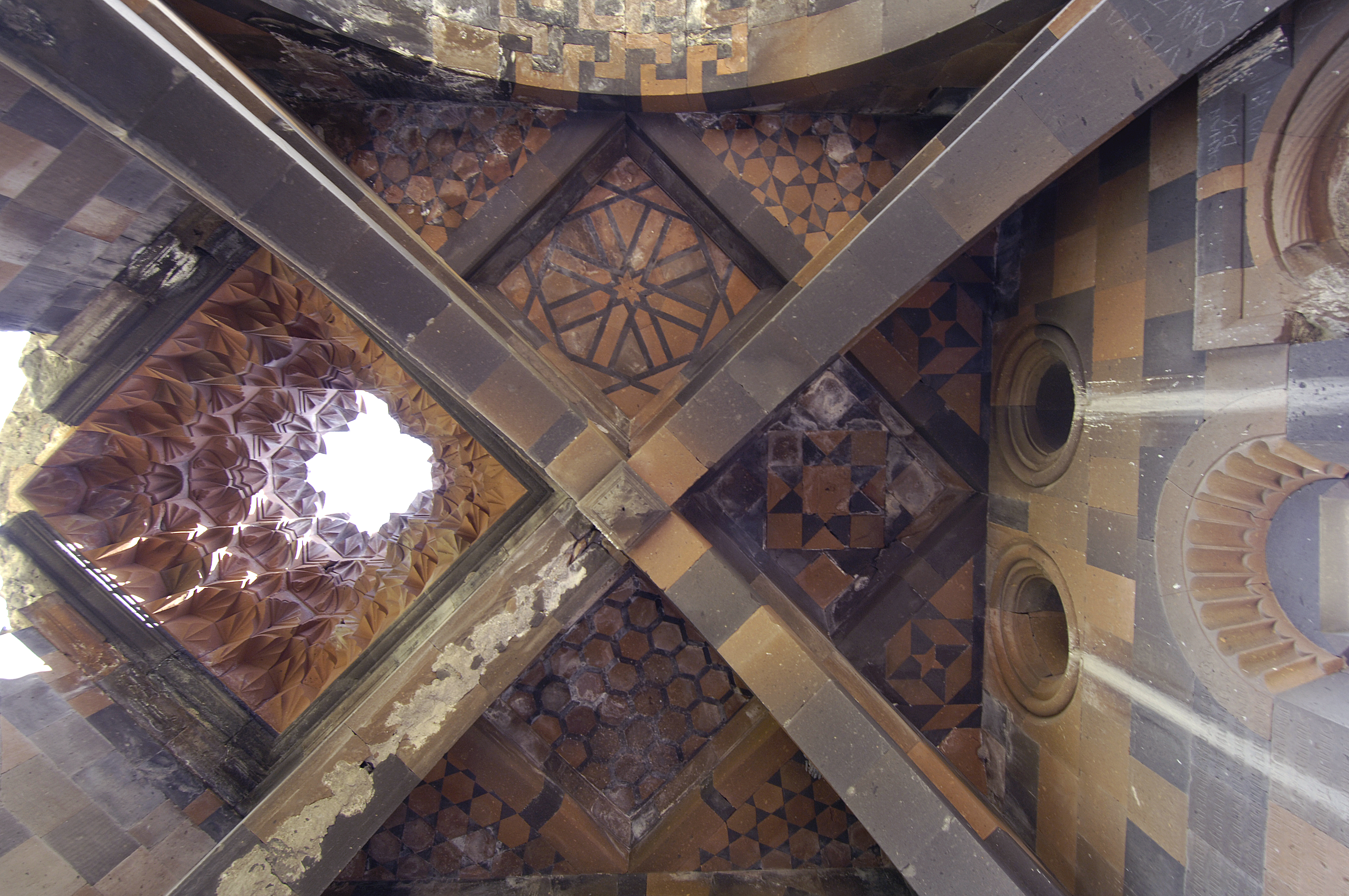
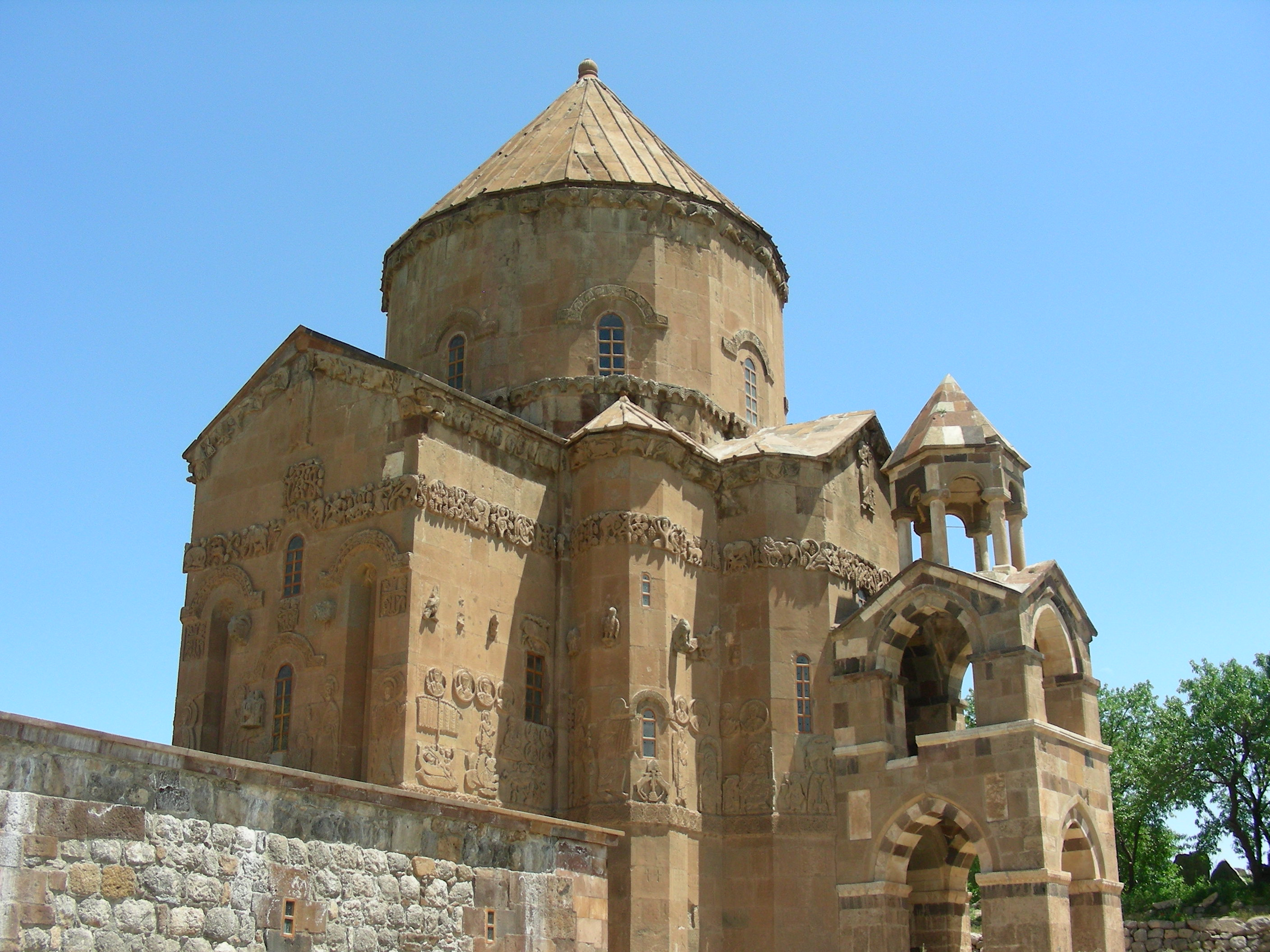
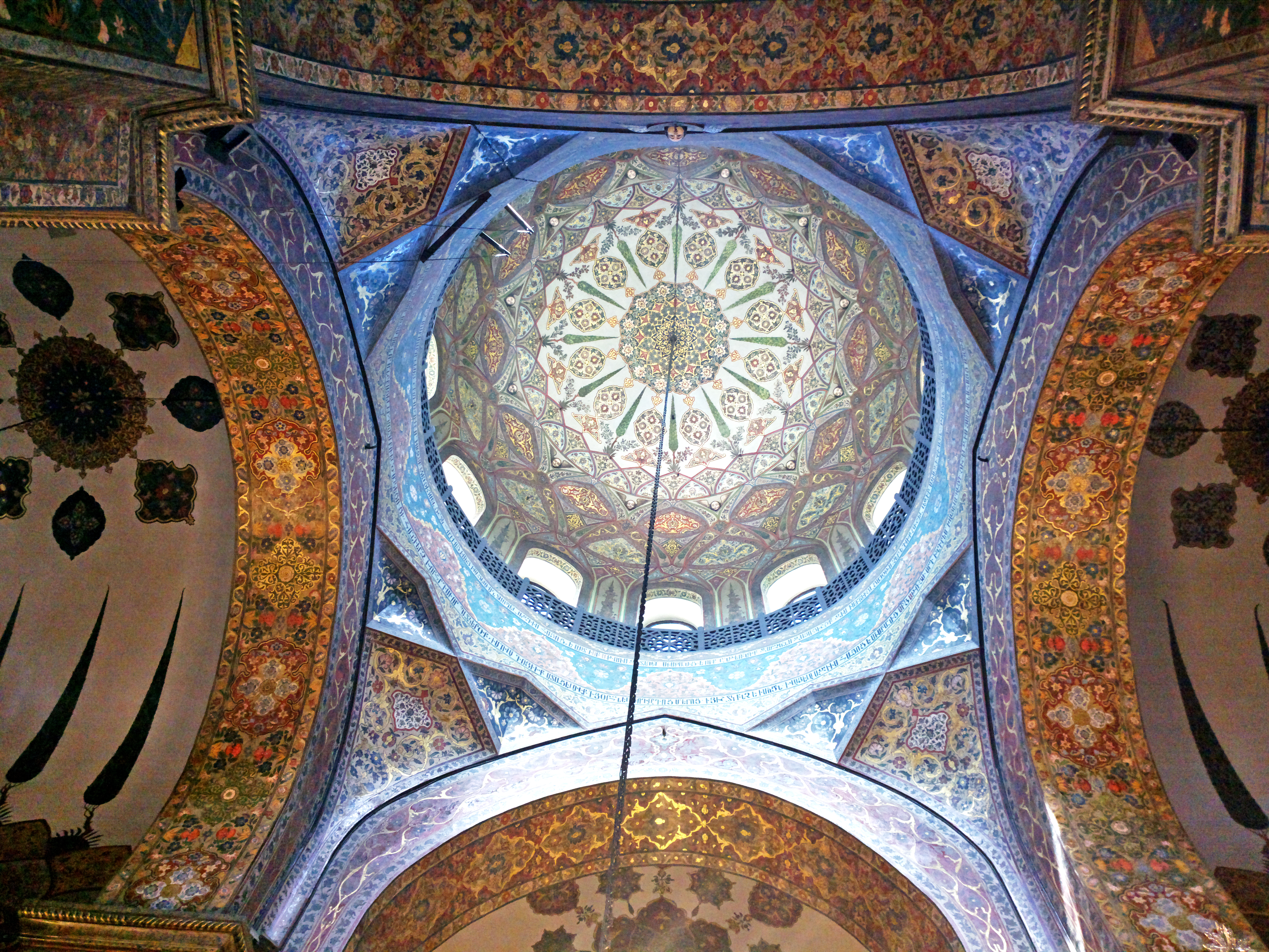
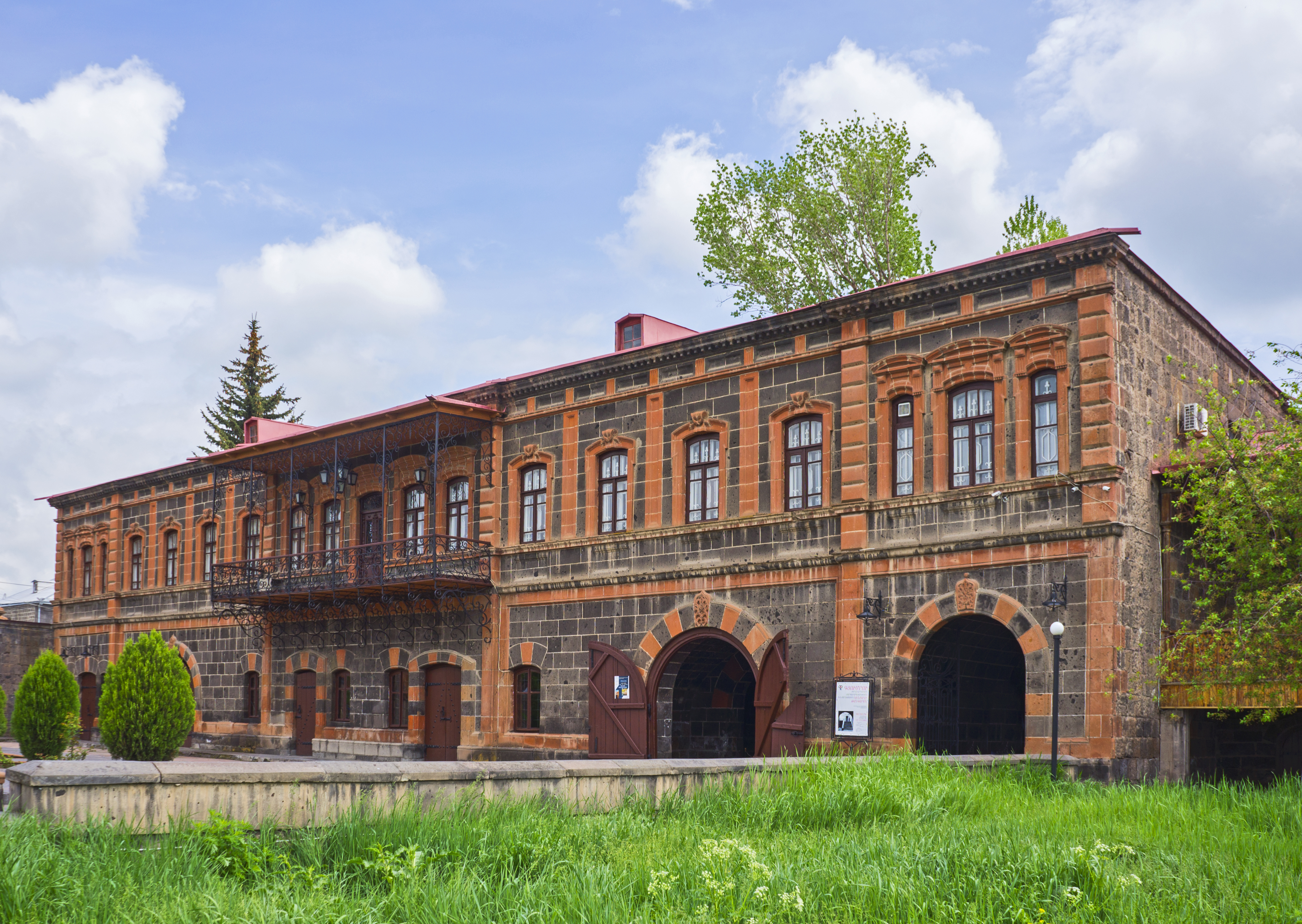
- From top to bottom: Saint Stepanos Monastery of Julfa (12th century); Church of the Holy Apostles in Ani (c. 9th century); Aghtamar cathedral (c. 8th century); Etchmiadzin cathedral and its Dome (4th century); Monastery of Geghard (13th century); and Kumayri historic district (19th century)

Additional media
- Years active: c. 3rd millennium BC – present
- Location: Armenian highlands

Armenian architecture comprises architectural works with an aesthetic or historical connection to the Armenian people. It is difficult to situate this architectural style within precise geographical or chronological limits, but many of its monuments were created in the regions of historical Armenia, the Armenian Highlands. The greatest achievement of Armenian architecture is generally agreed to be its medieval churches and seventh century churches, though there are different opinions precisely in which respects.

== Common characteristics of Armenian architecture ==
Medieval Armenian architecture, and Armenian churches in particular, have several distinctive features, which some believe to be the first national style of a church building.

Common characteristics include:

- Pointed domes, reminiscent of the volcanic cone of Greater Ararat. The conical or semiconical radially segmented dome or cupola is mounted above vaulted ceilings on a cylindrical drum (usually polygonal on the outside, most often octagonal)
- The vertical emphasis of the whole structure, with the height often exceeding the length of a church
- Reinforcement of the verticality with tall, narrow windows
- Stone vaulted ceilings
- Composed almost entirely of stone, usually volcanic tuff or basalt.
- A composite roof composed of finely cut tuff shingles
- Frescoes and carvings, if present, are usually ornate and include swirling intertwining grapevines and foliage.
- Heavy use of tall structural arches, both for supporting the cupola as part of the drum, the vaulted ceiling, and the vertical walls.
- Roofs intersecting to support the dome, both in basilicas and centrally planned churches.
- Sculptural decoration of external walls, including figures.

== Classification of Armenian churches ==
Within the bounds of the aforementioned common characteristics, individual churches display considerable variation which may reflect time, place, and the creativity of its designer. Toros Toramanian distinguished the following classical styles while studying these variations in the early 20th century:

The Classical Styles of Armenian Architecture According to Toros Toramanian
| Style | Armenian nomenclature | Example |
|---|---|---|
| Basilica | Bazilik (Բազիլիկ) | Ererouk |
| Domed basilica | Gmbetakir bazilik (Գմբեթակիր բազիլիկ) | Tekor Basilica |
| Cruciform | Etchmiadznatip (Էջմիածնատիպ; literally "Etchmiadzin-type") | Etchmiadzin Cathedral |
| Vertical-emphasis rectangular | Oughghagitz karankiun (Ուղղագիծ քառանկյուն) | Saint Gayane Church |
| Radial | Sharavighayin (Շառավիղային) | Saint Hripsime |
| Circular | Zvartnotsatip (Զվարթնոցատիպ; literally "Zvartnots-type") | Zvartnots |

== Construction ==
Armenian architecture, as it originates in an earthquake-prone region, tends to be built with this hazard in mind. Armenian buildings tend to be rather low-slung and thick-walled in design. Armenia has abundant resources of stone, and relatively few forests, so stone was nearly always used throughout for large buildings. Small buildings and most residential buildings were normally constructed of lighter materials, and hardly any early examples survive, as at the abandoned medieval capital of Ani.

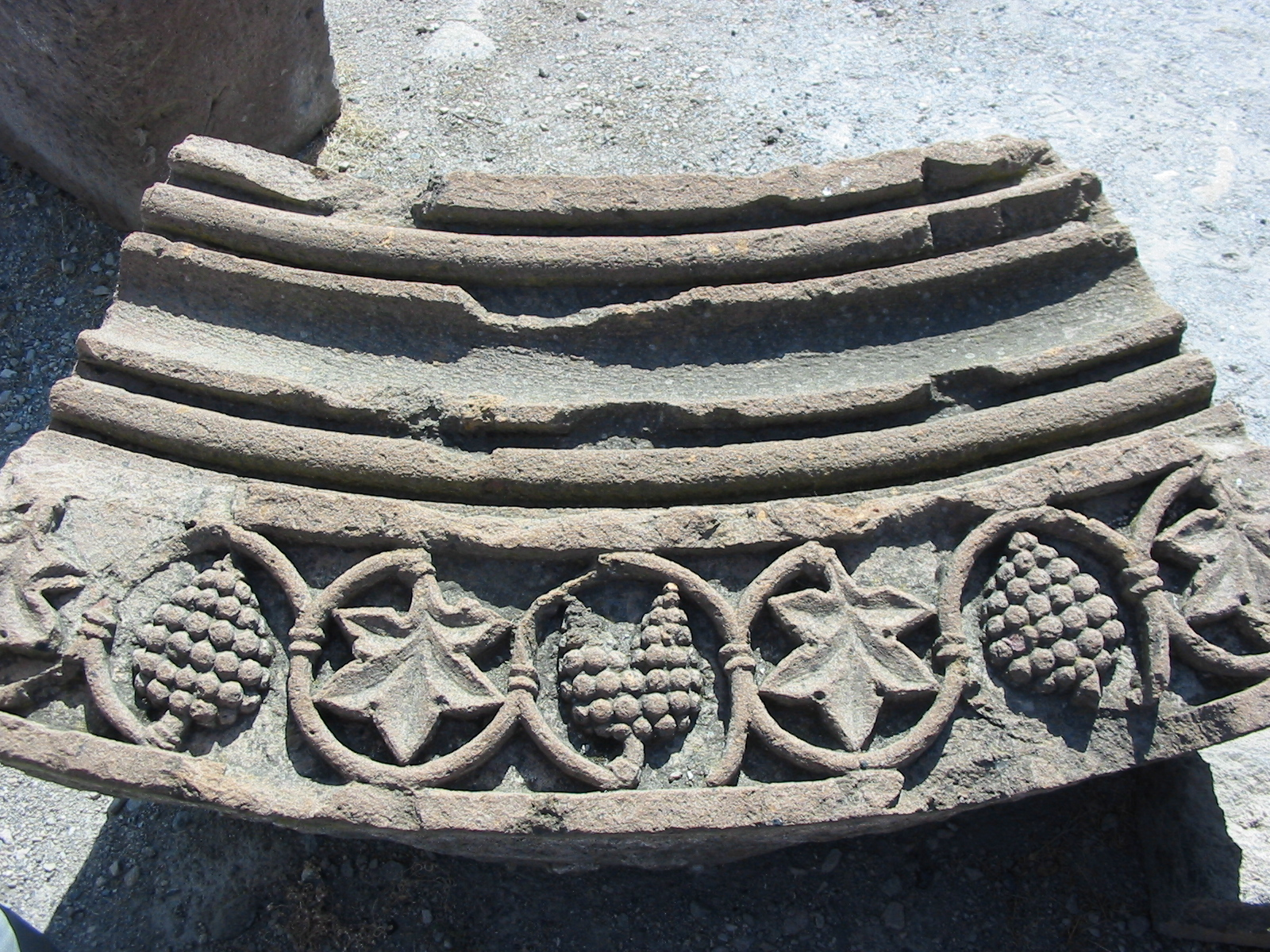
A vine-scroll motif on carvings from the 7th-century cathedral of Zvartnots.

The stone used in buildings is typically quarried all at the same location, to give the structure a uniform color. In cases where different color stone are used, they are often intentionally contrasted in a striped or checkerboard pattern. Powder made out of ground stone of the same type was often applied along the joints of the tuff slabs to give buildings a seamless look. Unlike the Romans or Syrians who were building at the same time, Armenians never used wood or brick when building large structures.

Armenian architecture employs a form of concrete to produce sturdy buildings,. It is a mixture of lime mortar, broken tuff, and rocks around which forms a core against which thin slabs of tuff are arranged in brickwork fashion. As the wet mortar mixture dries it forms a strong concrete-like mass sealed together with the tuff around it and, due to tuff's properties, it becomes harder with time. Initially, almost no core was used in the construction of churches, stone blocks were simply sealed together, but as architects saw how those with mortar cores withstood tremors, the size of the core expanded. Frescos of marble or another stone were often affixed to the side of these buildings, usually at a later date.

== History of Armenian architecture ==
The gradual development of Armenian architecture.

=== Pre-Christian Armenia ===
During the third millennium B.C, prehistoric Armenian architecture was already distinctive. The most common feature was its groundwork, which incorporated many geometrical shapes, ultimately forming a cell shape. An example of such architecture can be found in Kültəpə, near Nakhchivan. These buildings were approximately 6–7 metres wide and about 5 metres high.

Urban architectural traditions, and other forms of art in the years before Christ continued to develop and later were influenced by Greco-Roman art. Urartian architecture is known for its use of intricately cut rocks, used as foundations for mud brick buildings, usually constructed in a compact manner (such as in Erebuni).

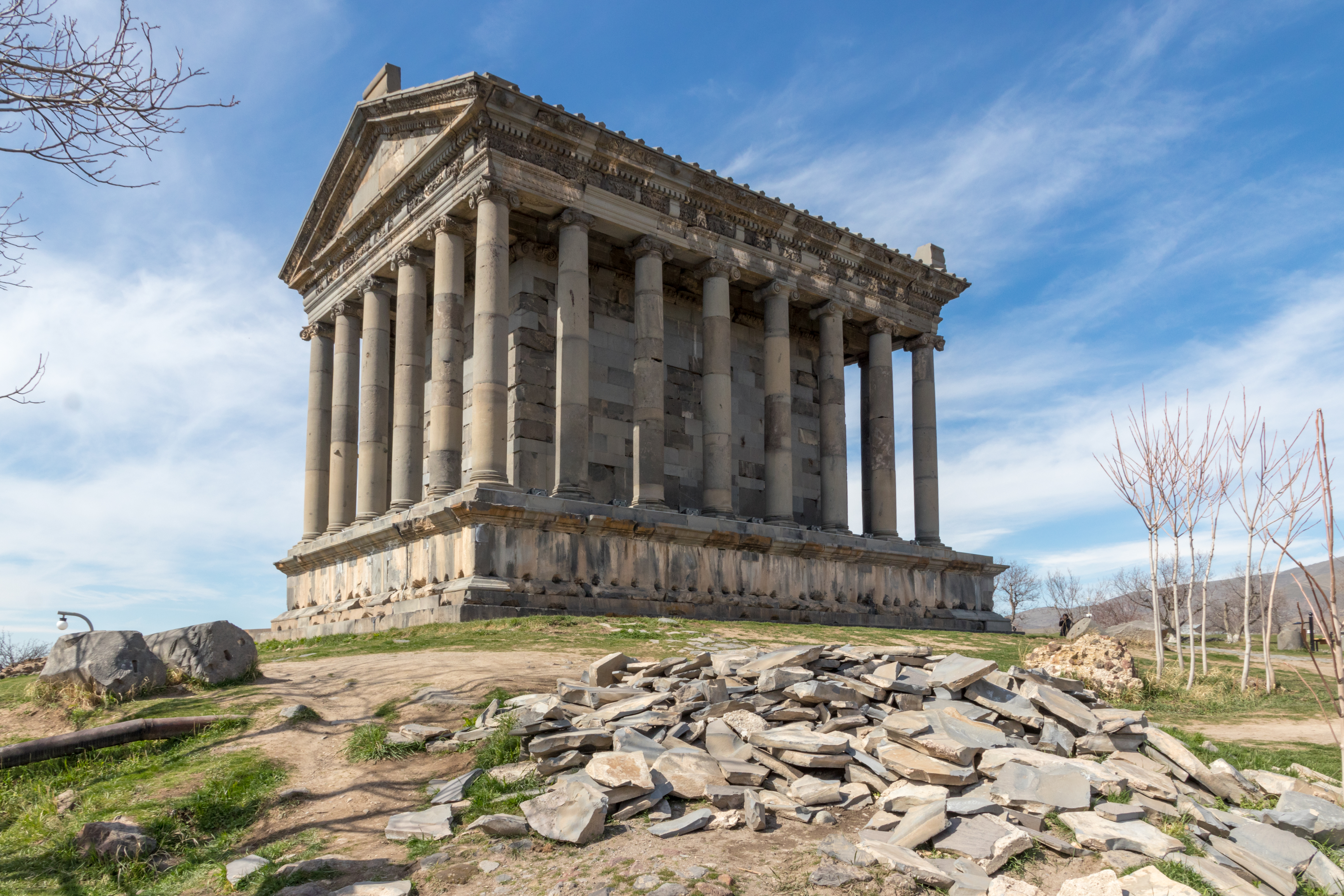
The Temple of Garni, the only standing Greco-Roman building in Armenia

Urartian temples had massive stone walls at lower levels and a relatively small interior space, usually square, and rose high; they were generally placed at the highest point of a site. Higher levels were in mud brick, which has not survived, and it is not fully clear how appeared. The late Temple of Garni of the 1st century AD, in a fully Hellenistic style, is the only pagan monument left in any sort of complete state in Armenia, as many others were destroyed or converted to Christian places of worship under Tiridates III of Armenia. Garni includes local elements of sacred numerology and geometry. The temple has a column to inter column ratio of 1/3 (1 is the primary number of the universe and 3 is the holiest of all numbers as it represents the Greco-Roman triad Jupiter, Juno and Minerva). Aside from being aesthetically beautiful, Garni's design can be seen as being a reaffirmation of the universal laws that governed man's destiny. The angles, number of columns, and dimensions were created with a careful eye; Armenian pagans wanted to appease the gods and protect humanity from their wrath. This sacred geometry is evident in the entire temple. To the people who created it, it was the perfect embodiment of their communion with the universe. Note that although sacred geometry was mostly used in religious buildings, secular buildings adopted some aspects of it.

=== 10th century BC – 1st century BC ===
- Horom Citadel, Bronze Age
- Haykaberd, 1st millennium BC
- Musasir, 825 BC
- The Van Citadel, 9th century BC
- Erebuni Fortress, 782 BC
- Odzaberd, 735–713 BC
- Teishebaini, Between 650 and 600 BC
- Argishtikhinili, 8th and 6th centuries BC
- Kumayri historic district, 5th century BC
- Armavir, 331 Bc (originally 8th century BC)
- Artaxata, 176 BC
- Tigranakert of Artsakh, 2nd–1st century BC
- Mount Nemrut, 1st century BC

=== Christian Armenia ===
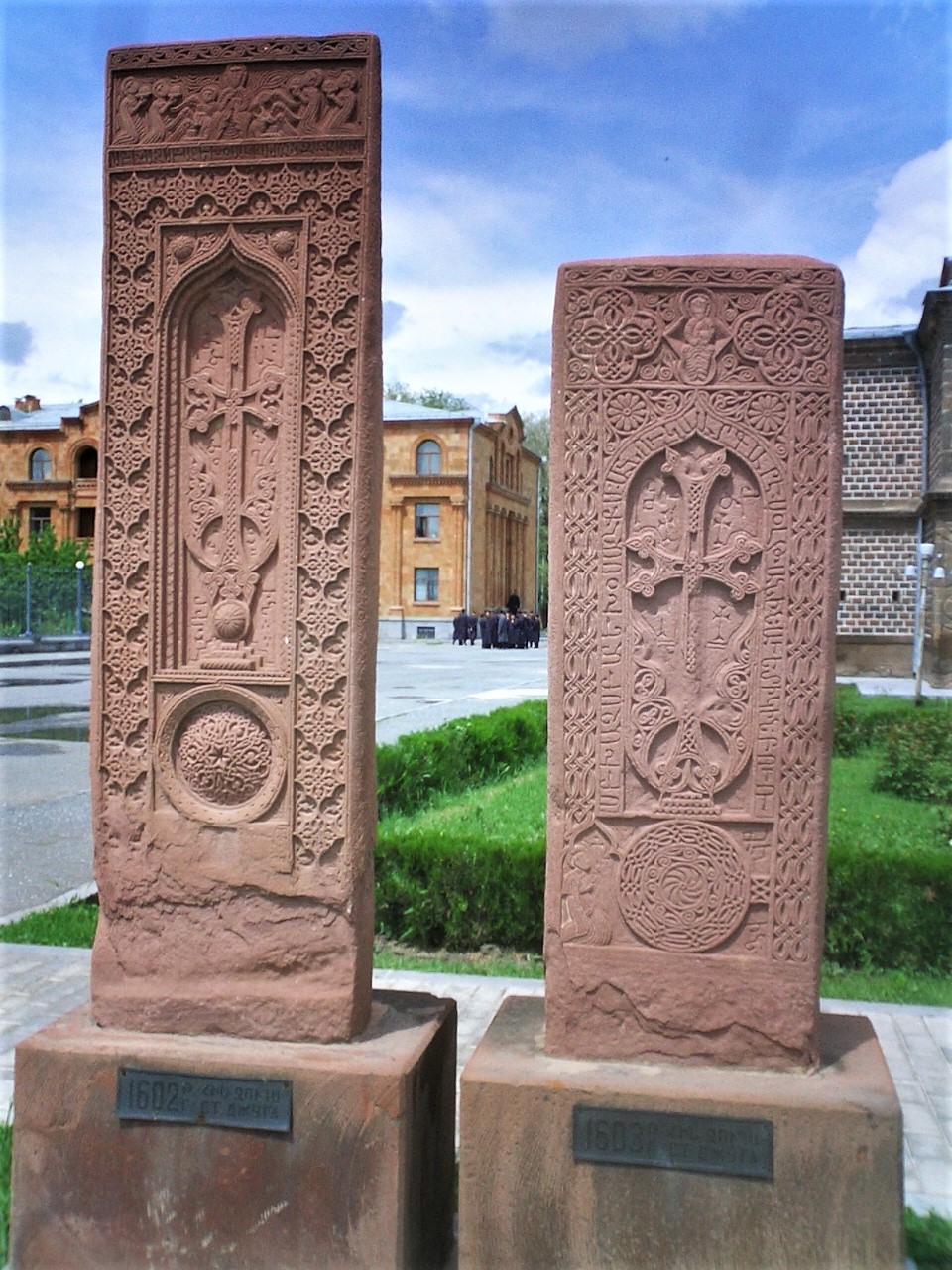
Late-medieval Armenian Khachkars from Julfa, Azerbaijan. They were removed from the Julfa graveyard before its destruction and are now on display within the precincts of Etchmiadzin in Armenia.

The adoption of Christianity as Armenia's official religion in 301 was followed by new developments in Armenian architecture that continued to retain elements of earlier traditions. Armenian churches provide evidence for the study of medieval Armenia and the general landscape of the Christian East. The churches were designed and built in a time of diverse linguistic, religious, political, and ethnic groups.

The first Armenian churches were built on the orders of St. Gregory the Illuminator, and were often built on top of pagan temples, and imitated some aspects of Armenian pre-Christian architecture.

== Classical and Medieval Armenian architecture ==
=== The formative period ===
The first Armenian churches were built between the 4th and 7th century, beginning when Armenia converted to Christianity, and ending with the Arab invasion of Armenia. The early churches were mostly simple basilicas, but some with side apses. By the 5th century the typical cupola cone in the center had become widely used. By the 7th century, centrally-planned churches had been built and a more complicated niched buttress and radiating Hrip'simé style had formed. By the time of the Arab invasion, most of what we now know as classical Armenian architecture had formed.

=== Bagratid revival ===
From the 9th to 11th century, Armenian architecture underwent a revival under the patronage of the Bagratid dynasty with a great deal of building done in the area of Lake Van, this included both traditional styles and new innovations. Ornately carved Armenian khachkars were developed during this time. Many new cities and churches were built during this time, including a new capital at Lake Van and a new Cathedral on Akdamar Island to match. The Cathedral of Ani was also completed during this dynasty. It was during this time that the first major monasteries, such as Haghpat and Haritchavank were built. This period was ended by the Seljuk invasion.

=== Monasteries flourish ===
From the 12th to 14th century under the Zakarid dynasty saw an explosion in the number of monasteries built, including Saghmosavank Monastery, the Akhtala Monastery, Kaymaklı Monastery, Kecharis Monastery and Makaravank Monastery. Monasteries were institutes of learning, and much of medieval Armenian literature was written in this time period. The invasion of Timurlane and the destruction of Cilician Armenia ended architectural progression from another 250 .

=== Seventeenth century ===
The last great period in classic Armenian construction was under the Iranian Safavid Shahs, under which a number of new churches were built, usually at existing holy sites such as Etchmiadzin as well as in diaspora communities like New Julfa.

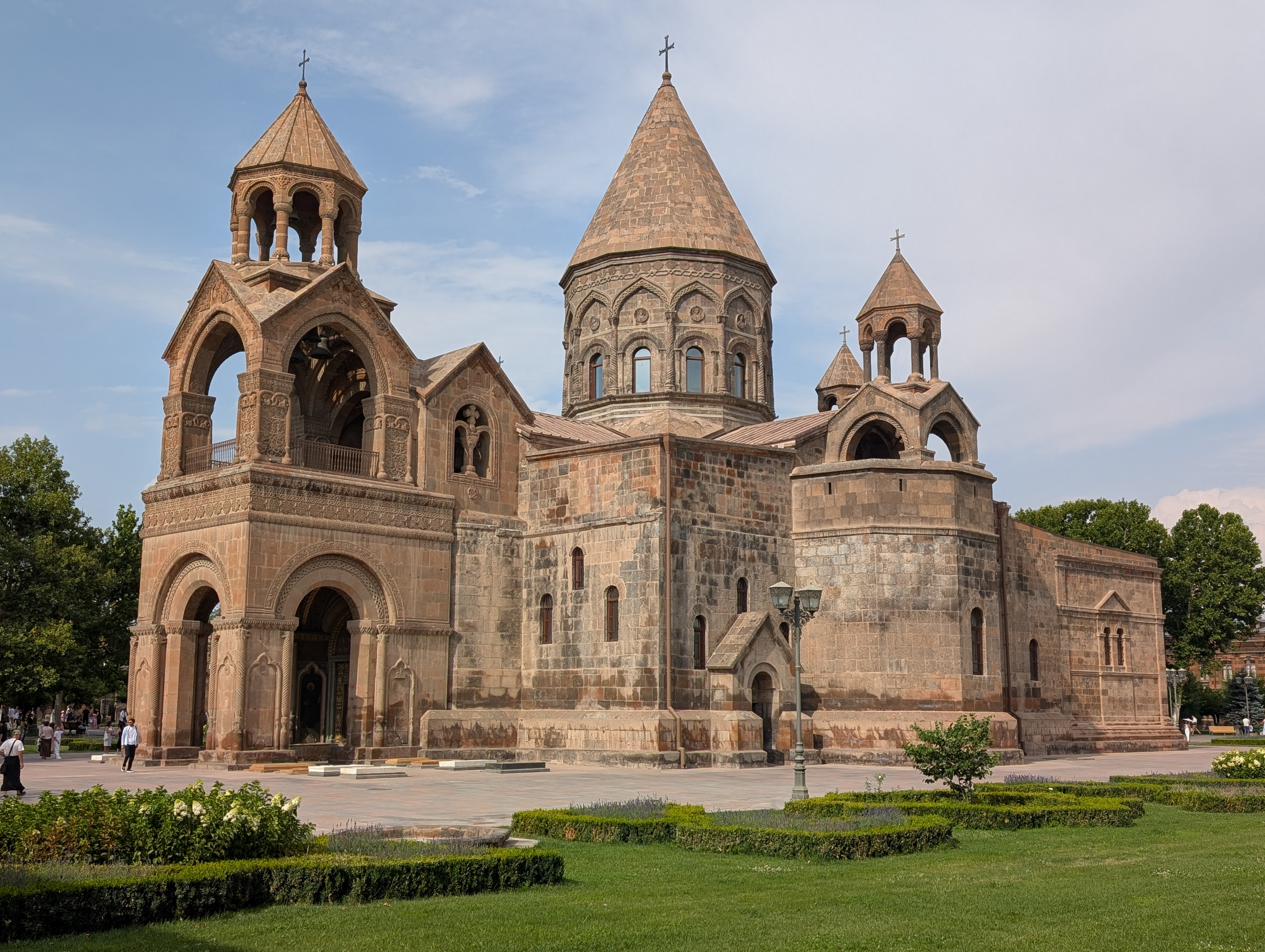
Etchmiadzin Cathedral in Vagharshapat (483/4–1868)

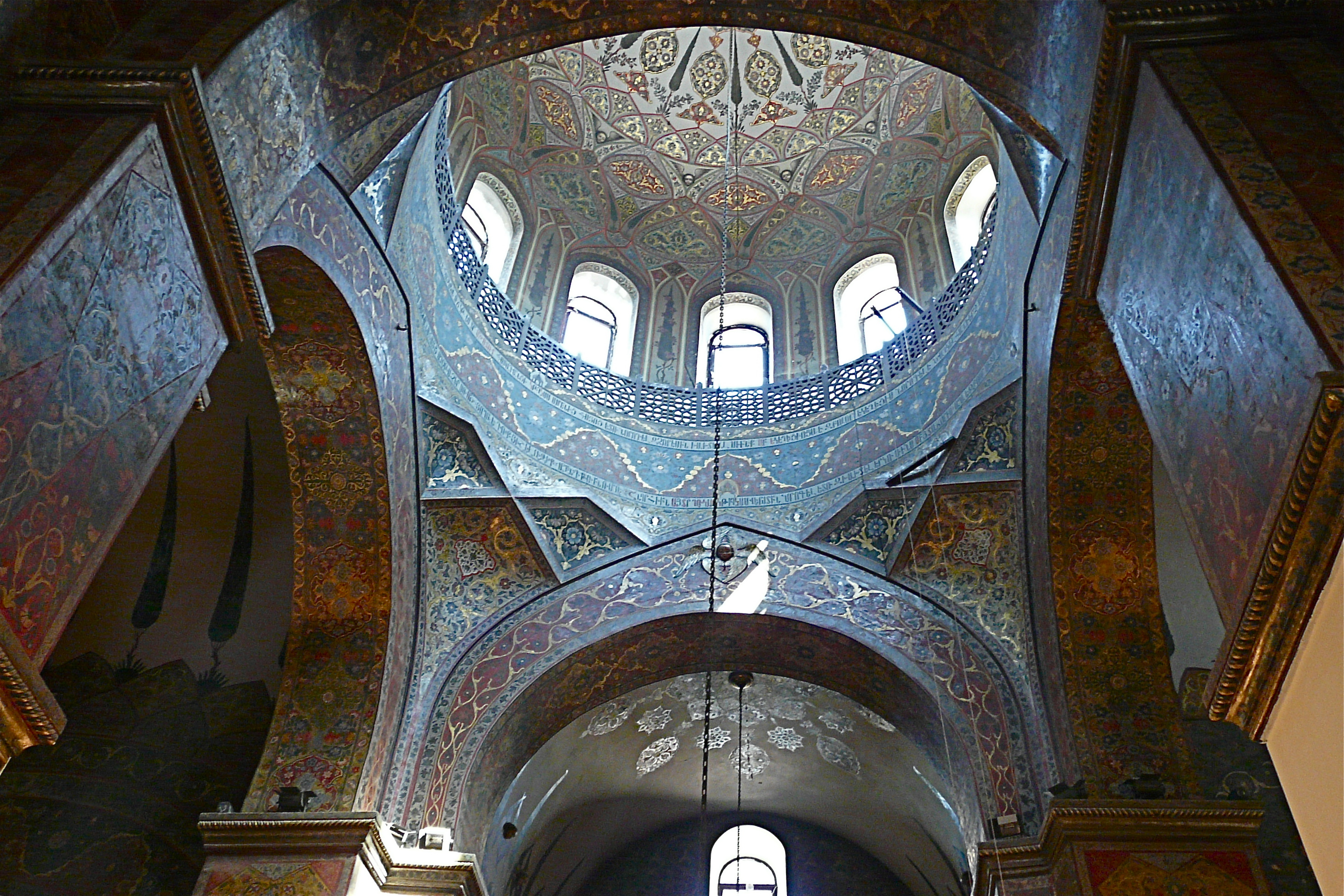
The cupola of the Cathedral of Etchmiadzin in Vagharshapat

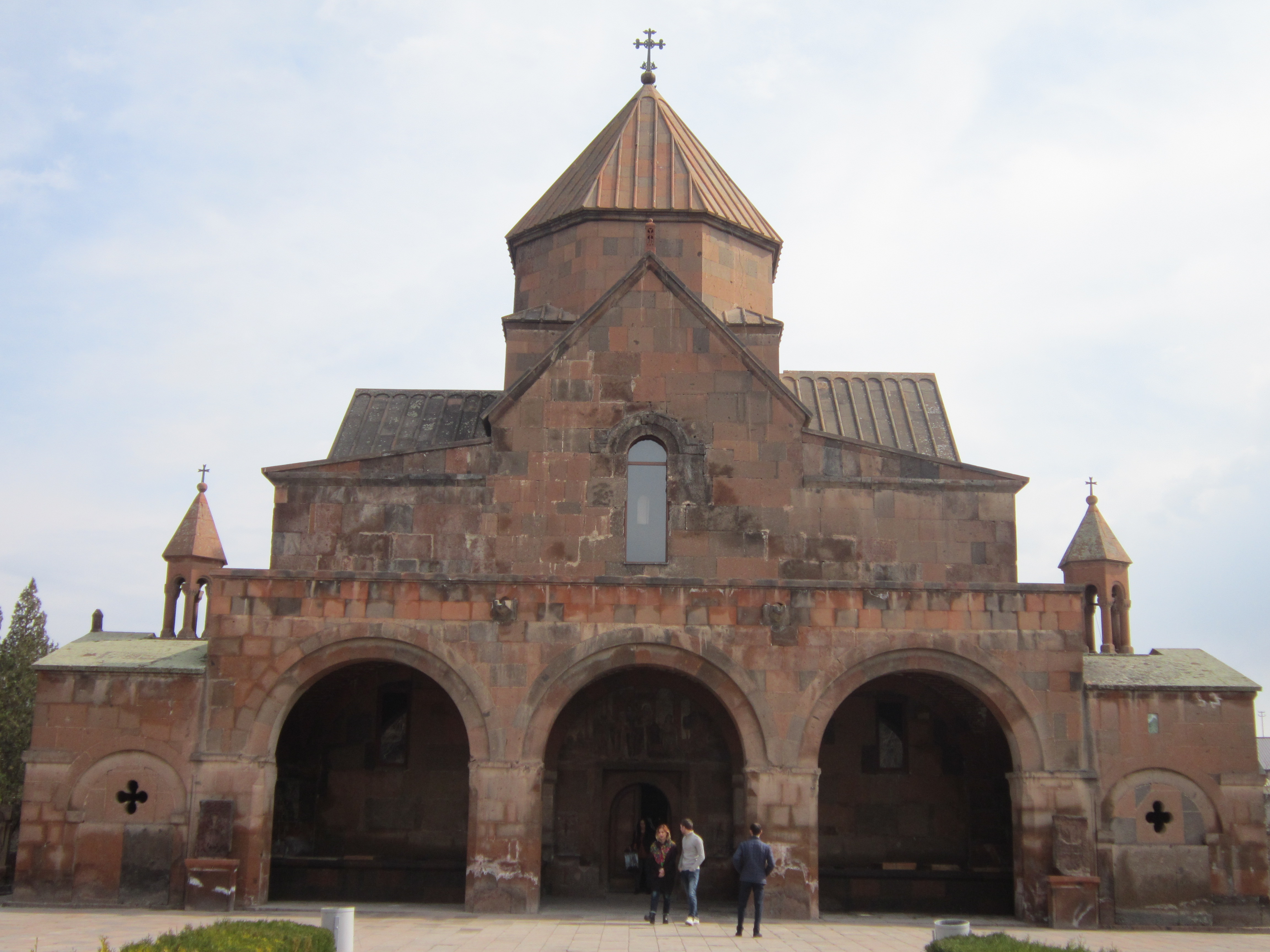
Saint Gayane Church in Vagharshapat (7th century)

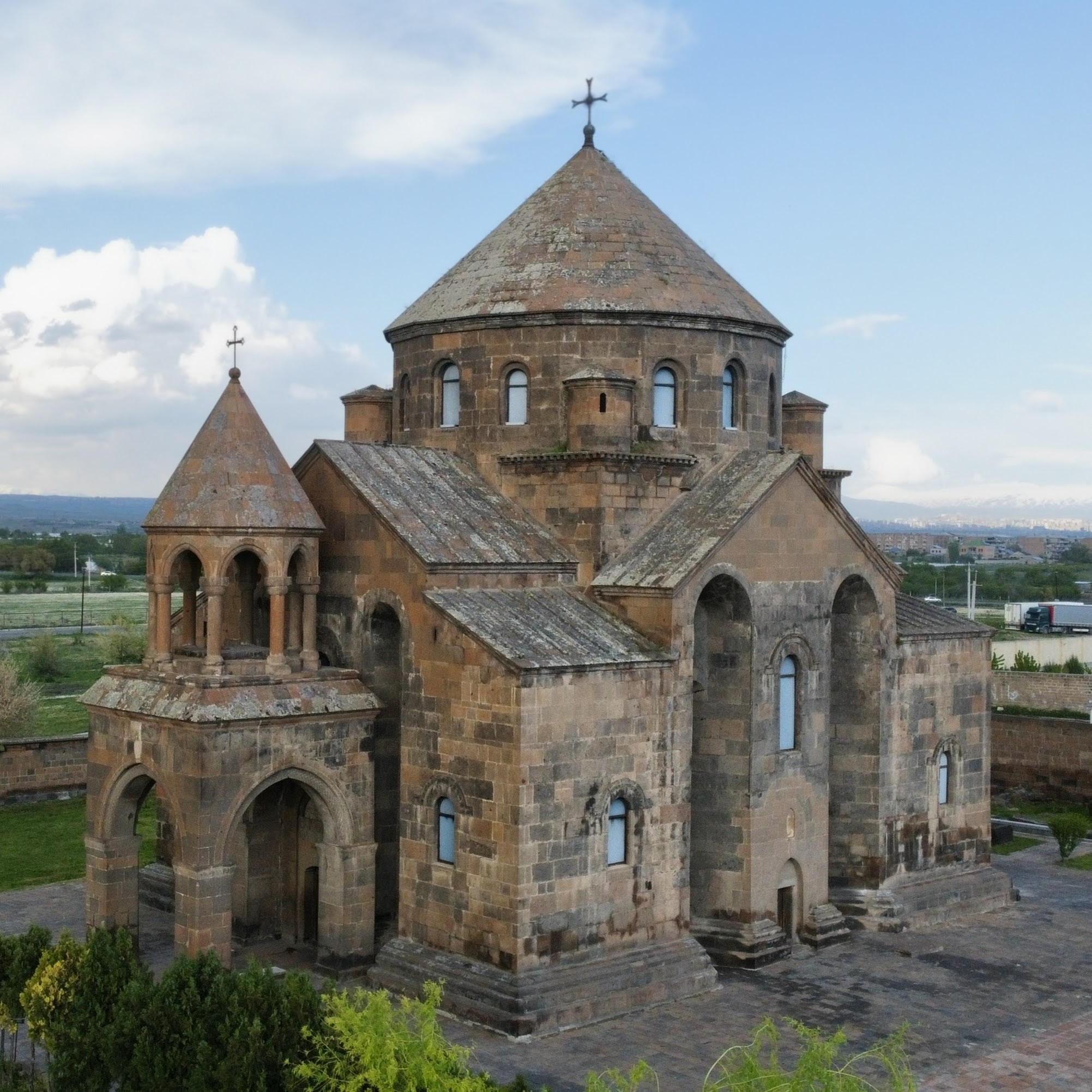
Saint Hripsime Church in Vagharshapat (7th century)

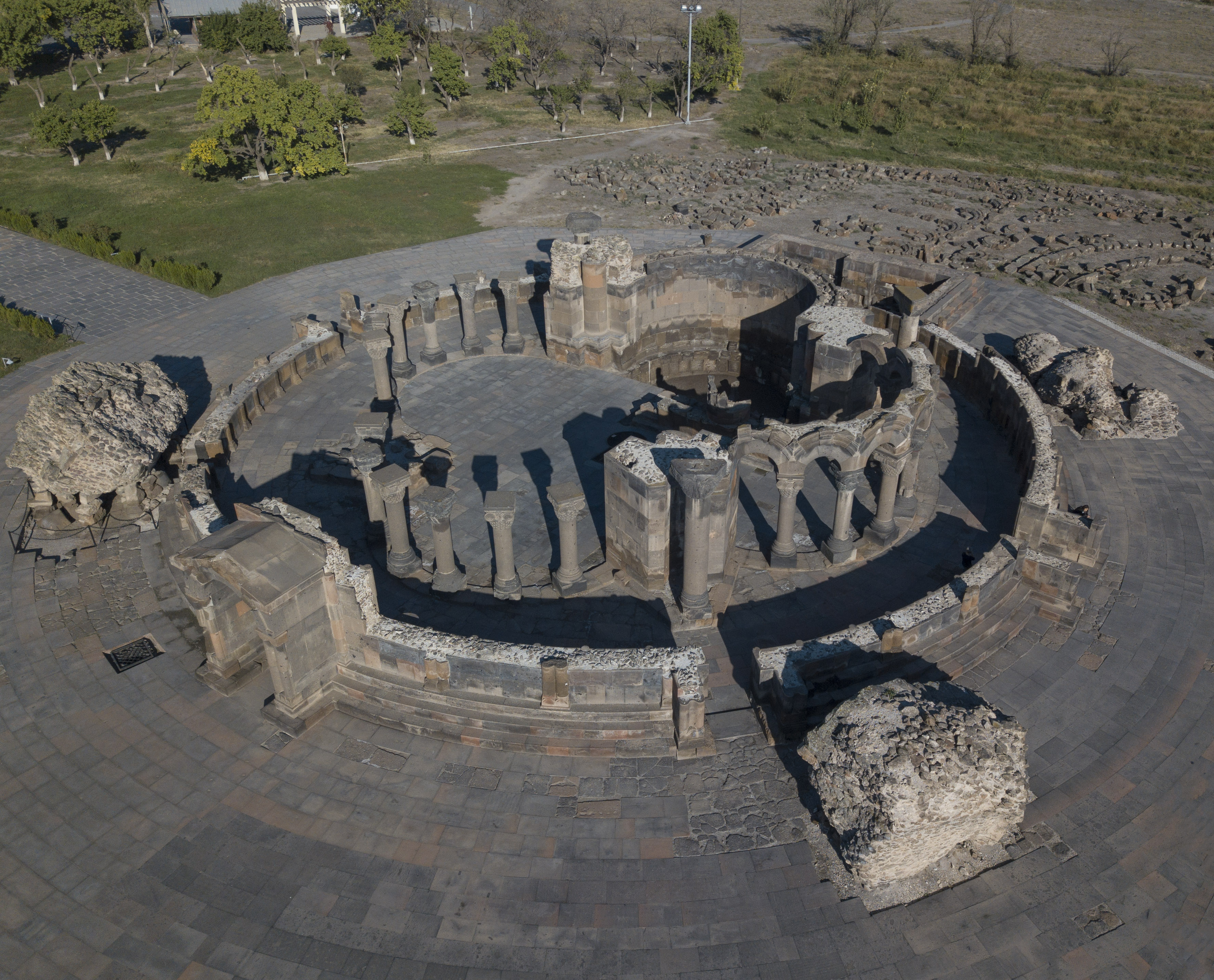
Ruins of the Zvartnots Cathedral near Vagharshapat (7th century)

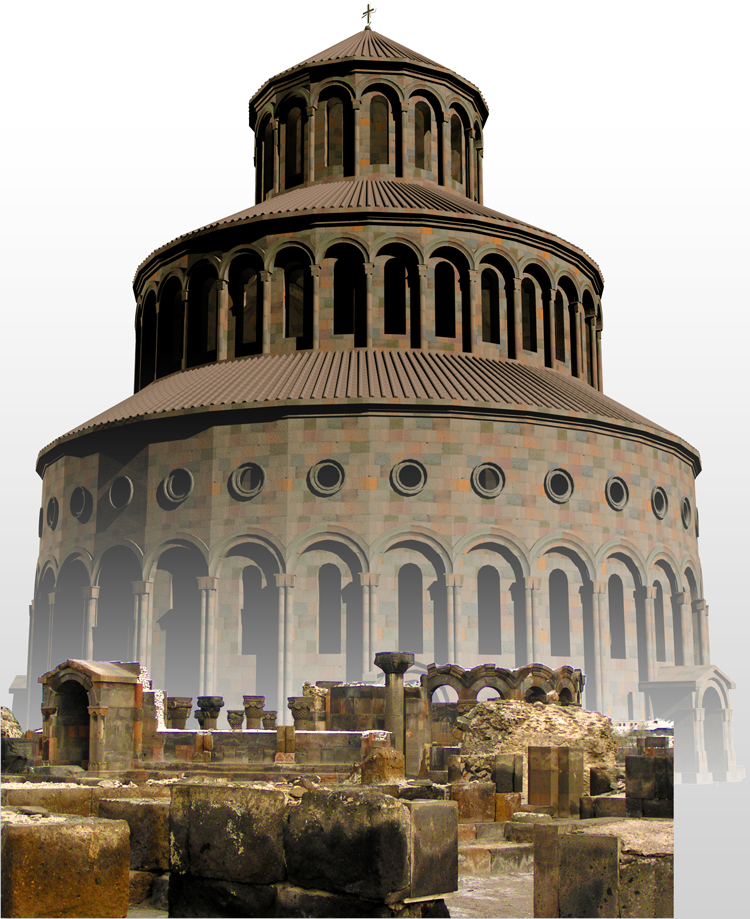
Digital reconstruction of the Zvartnots Cathedral near Vagharshapat

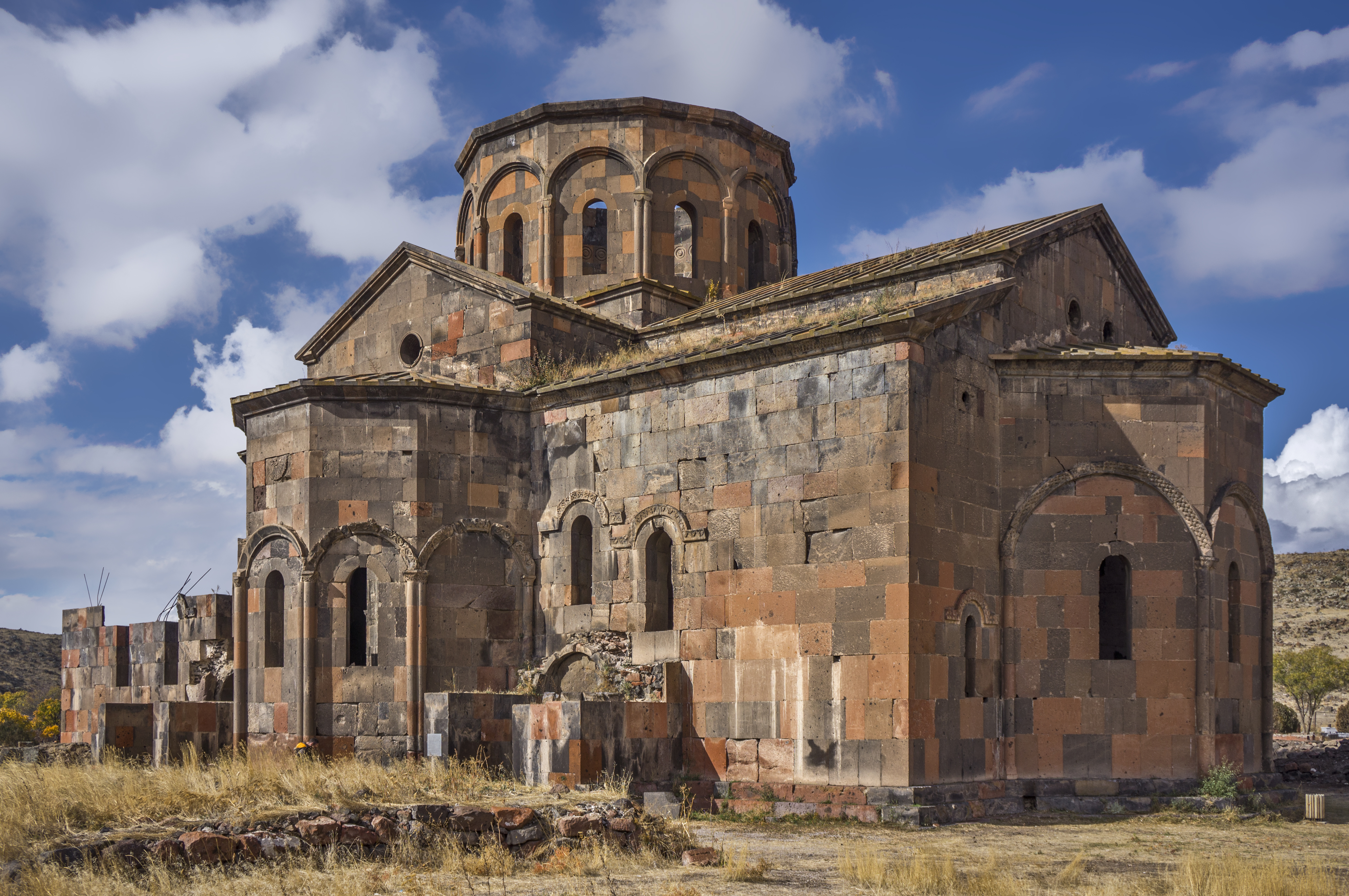
Cathedral of Talin (7th century)

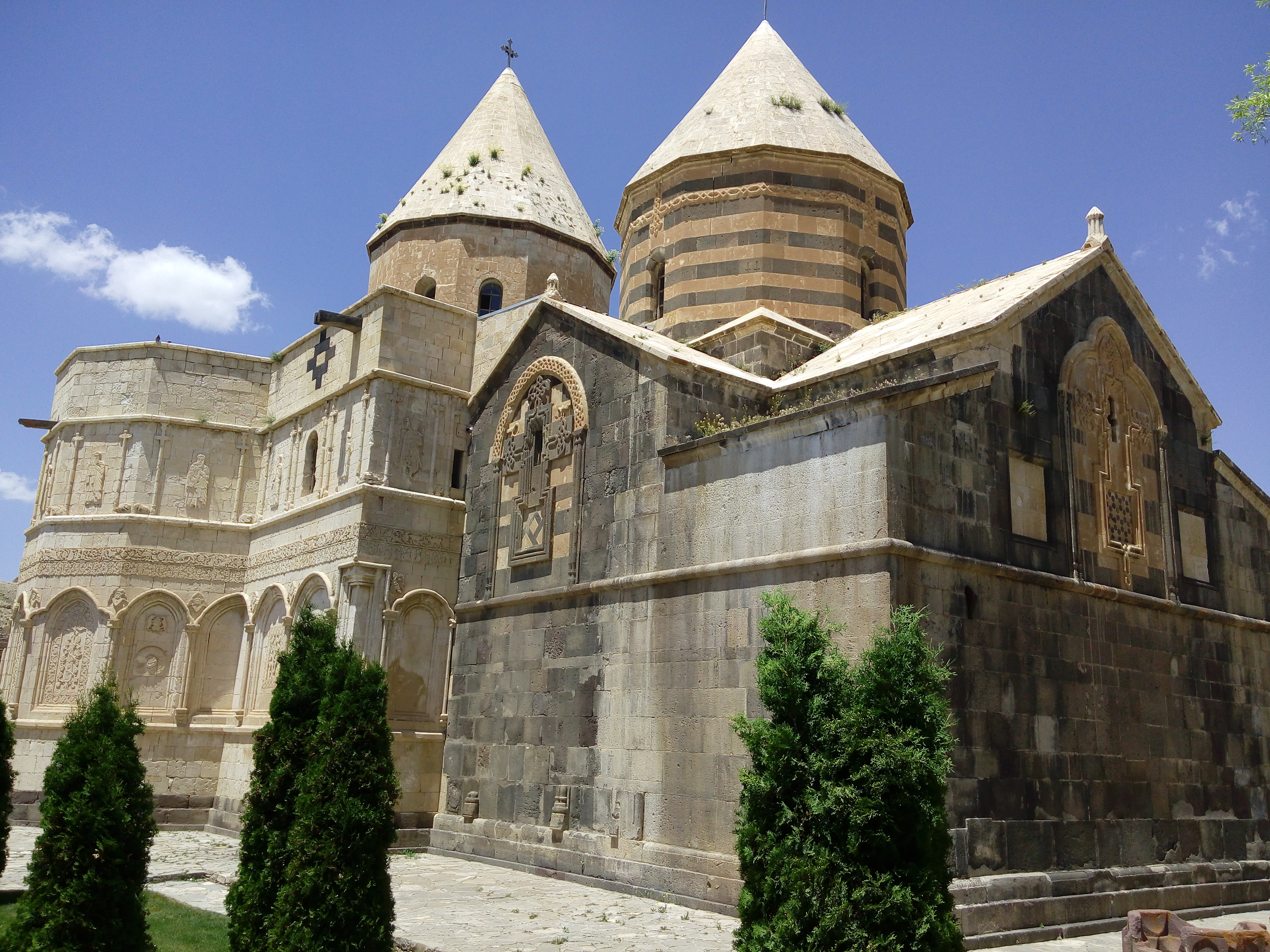
Monastery of Saint Thaddeus, Iran

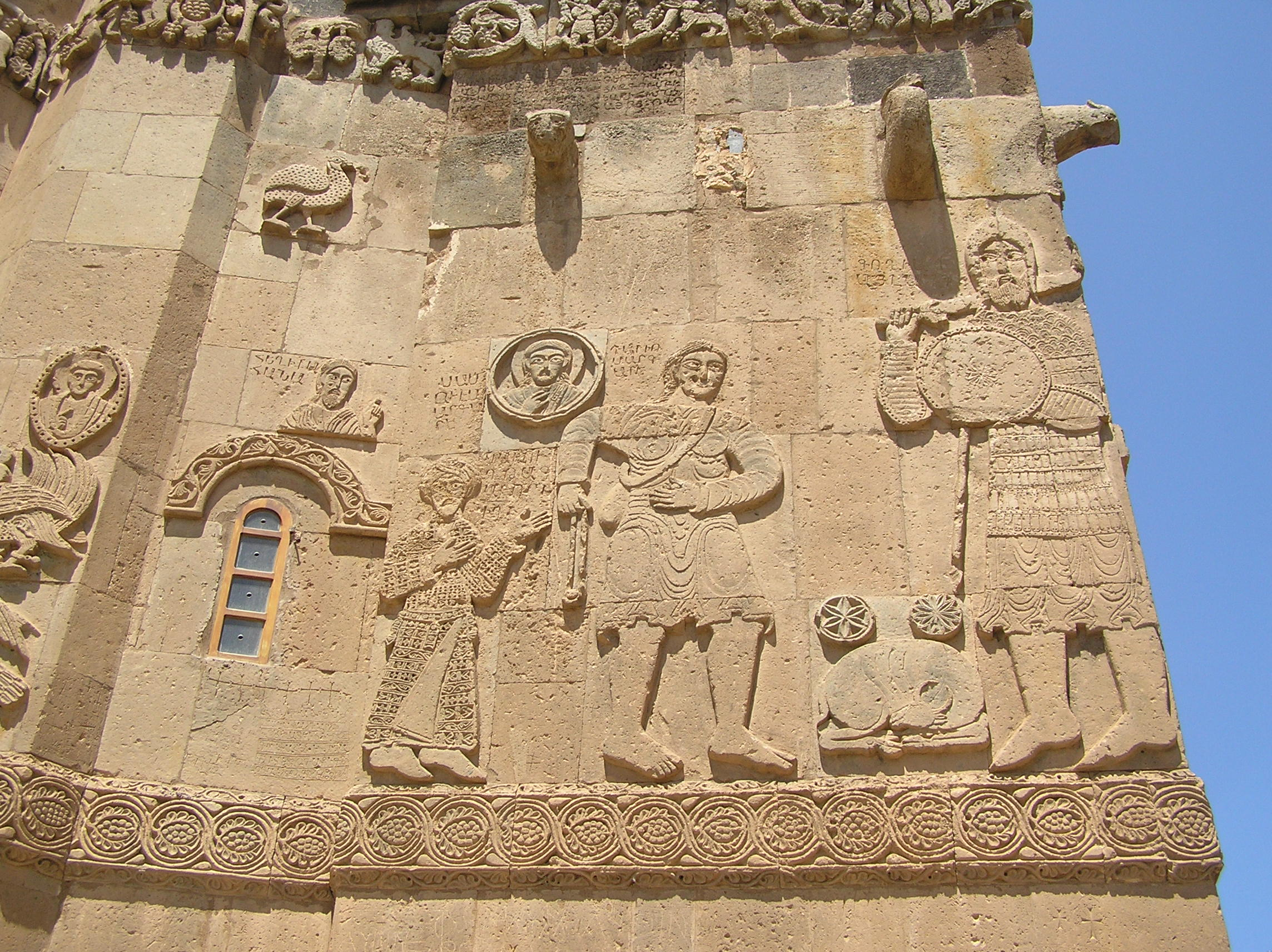
External reliefs of David and Goliath on the Cathedral at Akdamar (10th century)

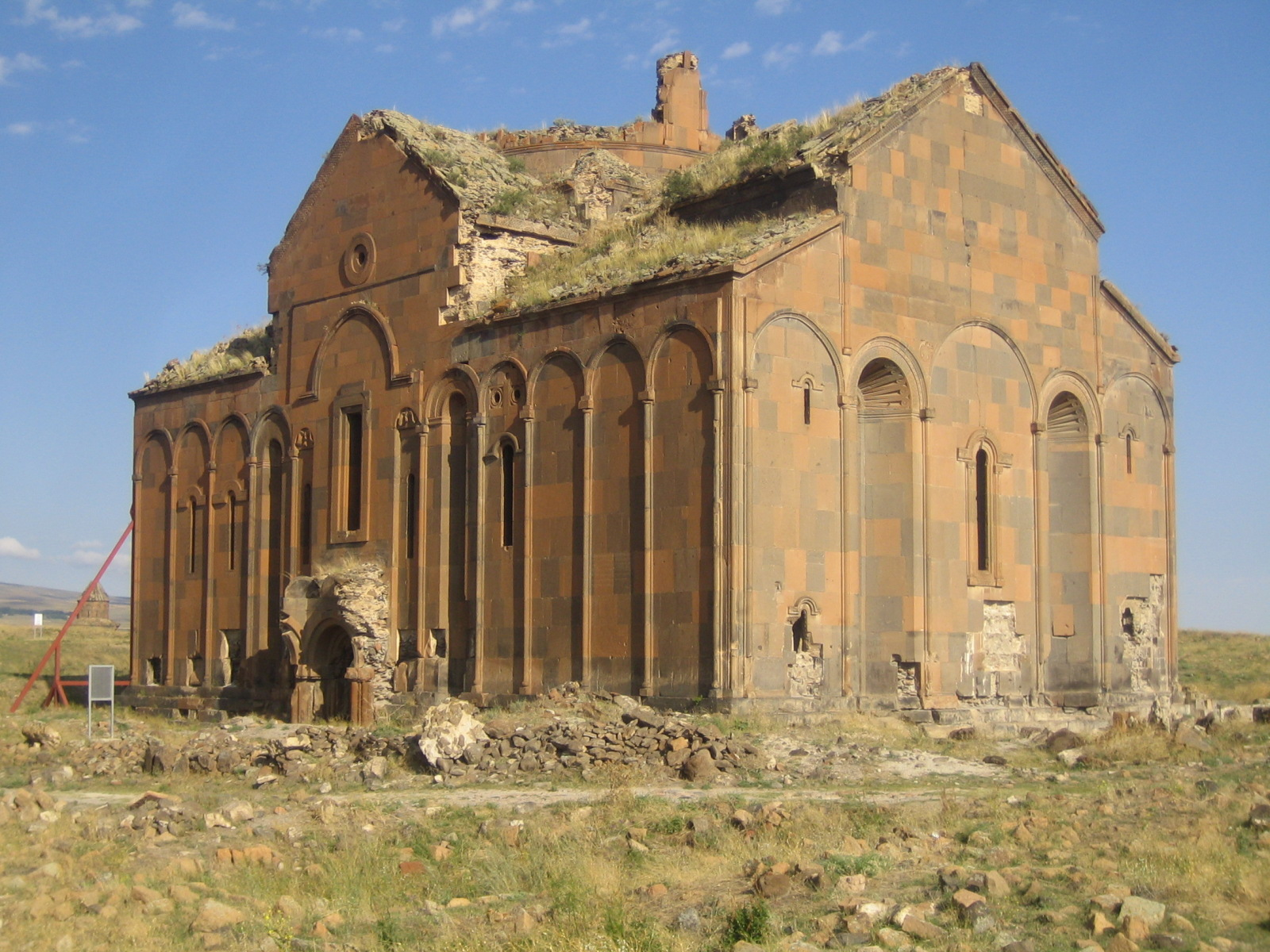
Cathedral in Ani, now Turkey (early 11th century)

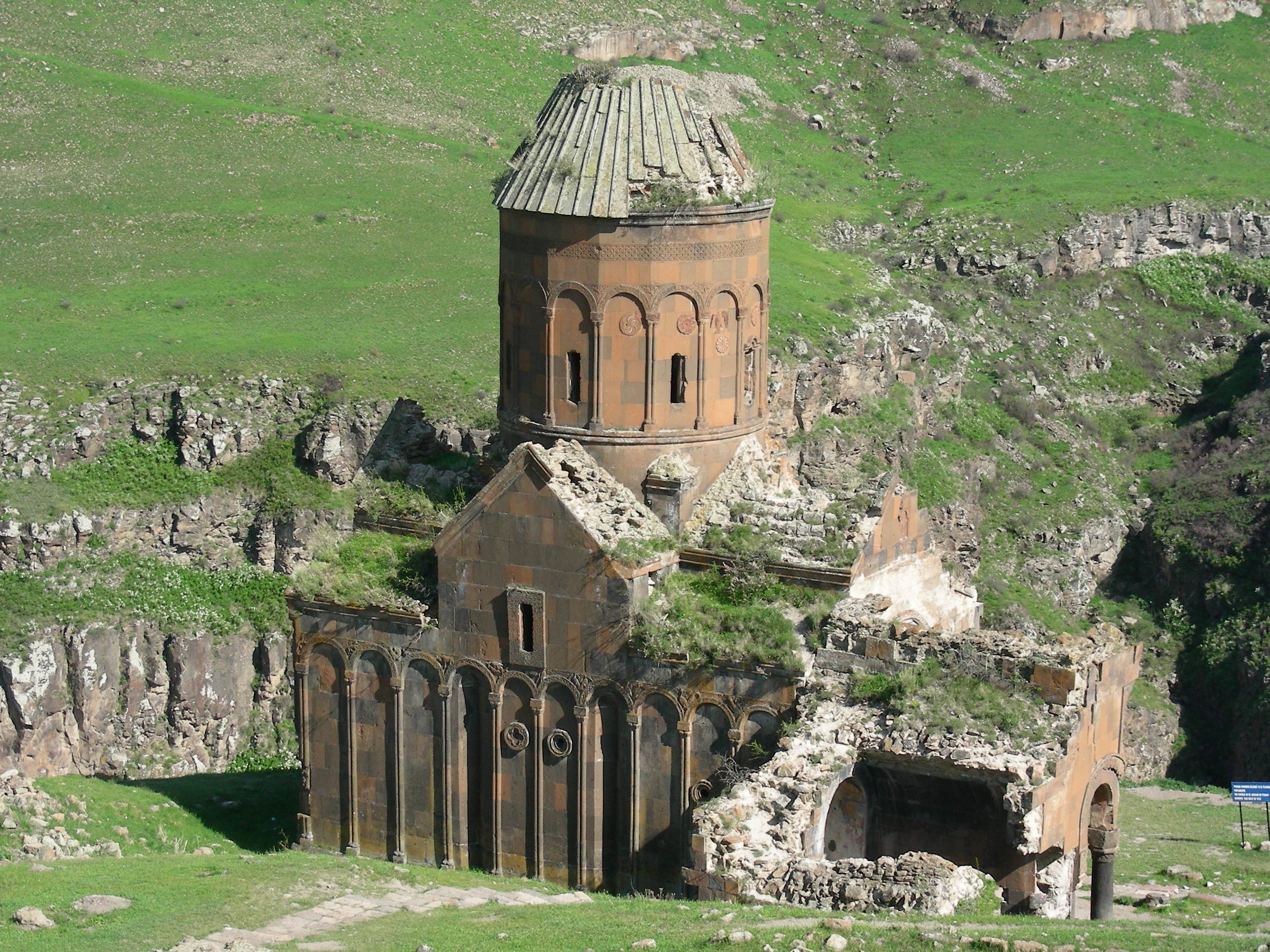
Church of St Gregory of Tigran Honents in Ani, now Turkey (13th century)

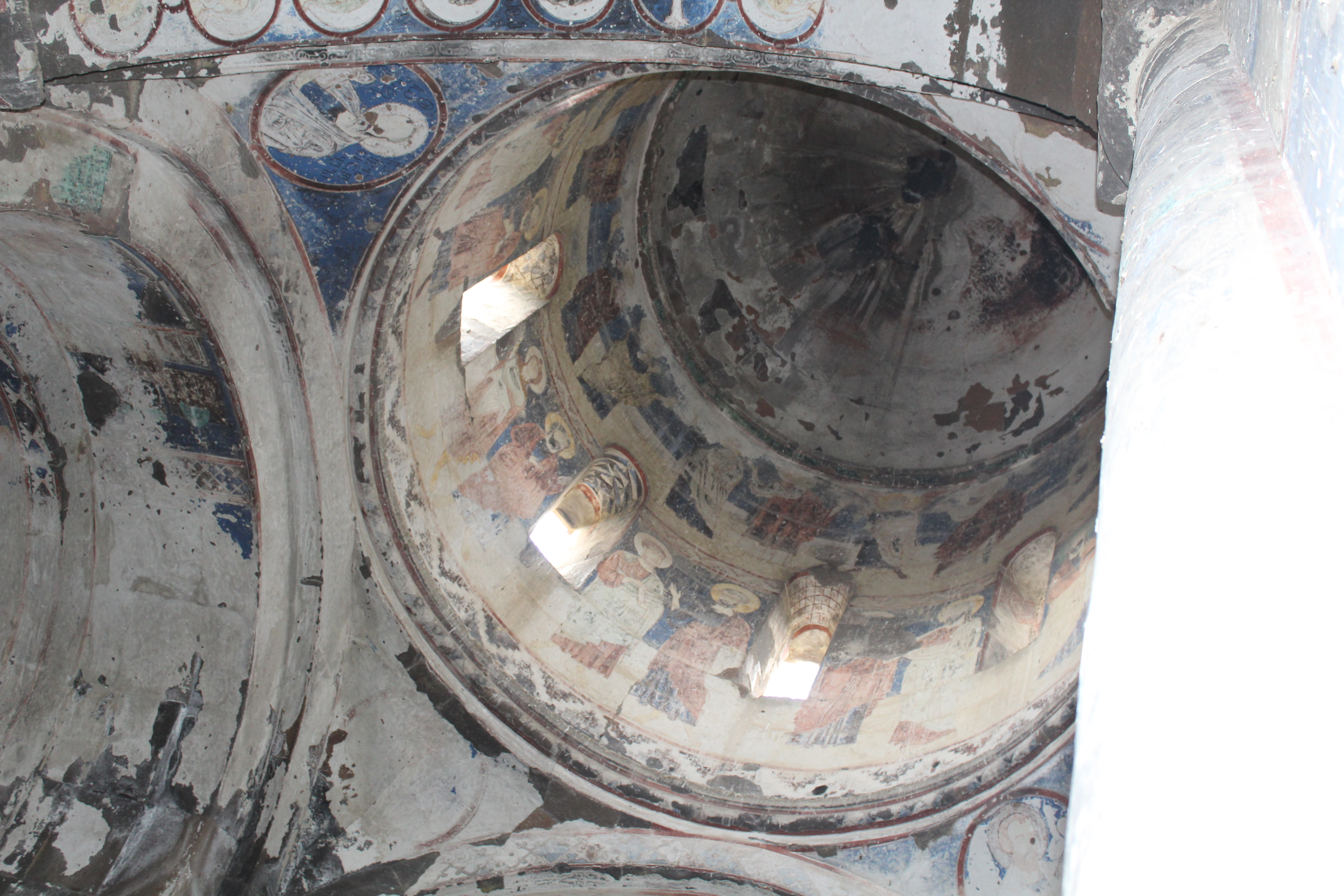
Dome of the Church of St Gregory of Tigran Honents in Ani, now Turkey (13th century)

== 19th and 20th century ==
=== Nineteenth century ===
Armenian architecture experienced a huge stage of development during the 19th century, when the Russians entered Eastern Armenia. A number of architectural masterpieces were built in the Kumayri historic district of Alexandropol and Yerevan, as well in Kars, which is now a part of the Republic of Turkey.

The Armenian buildings of that time were mainly made of black tuff, therefore those buildings were mainly of black color.

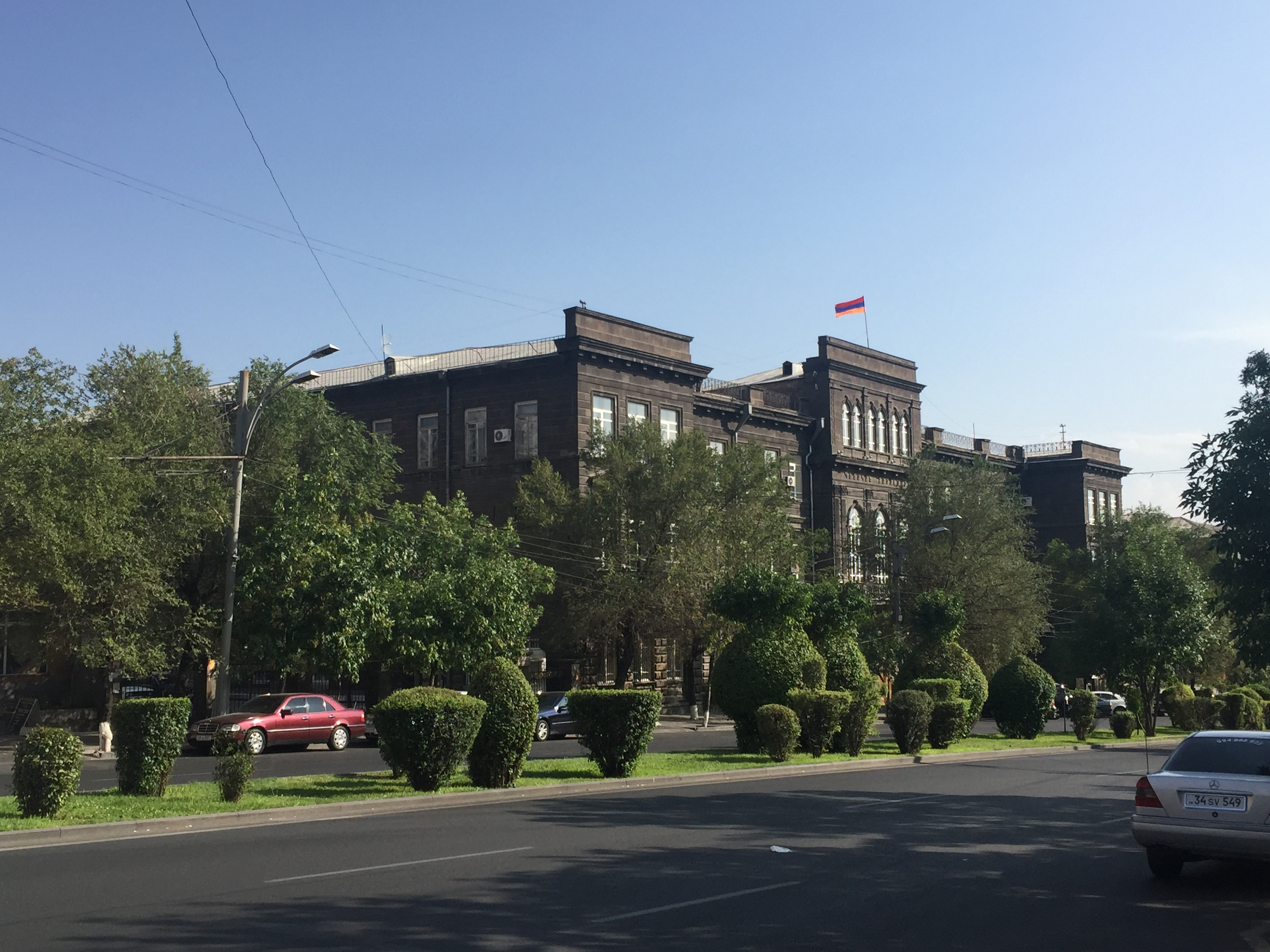
Yerevan State University old building

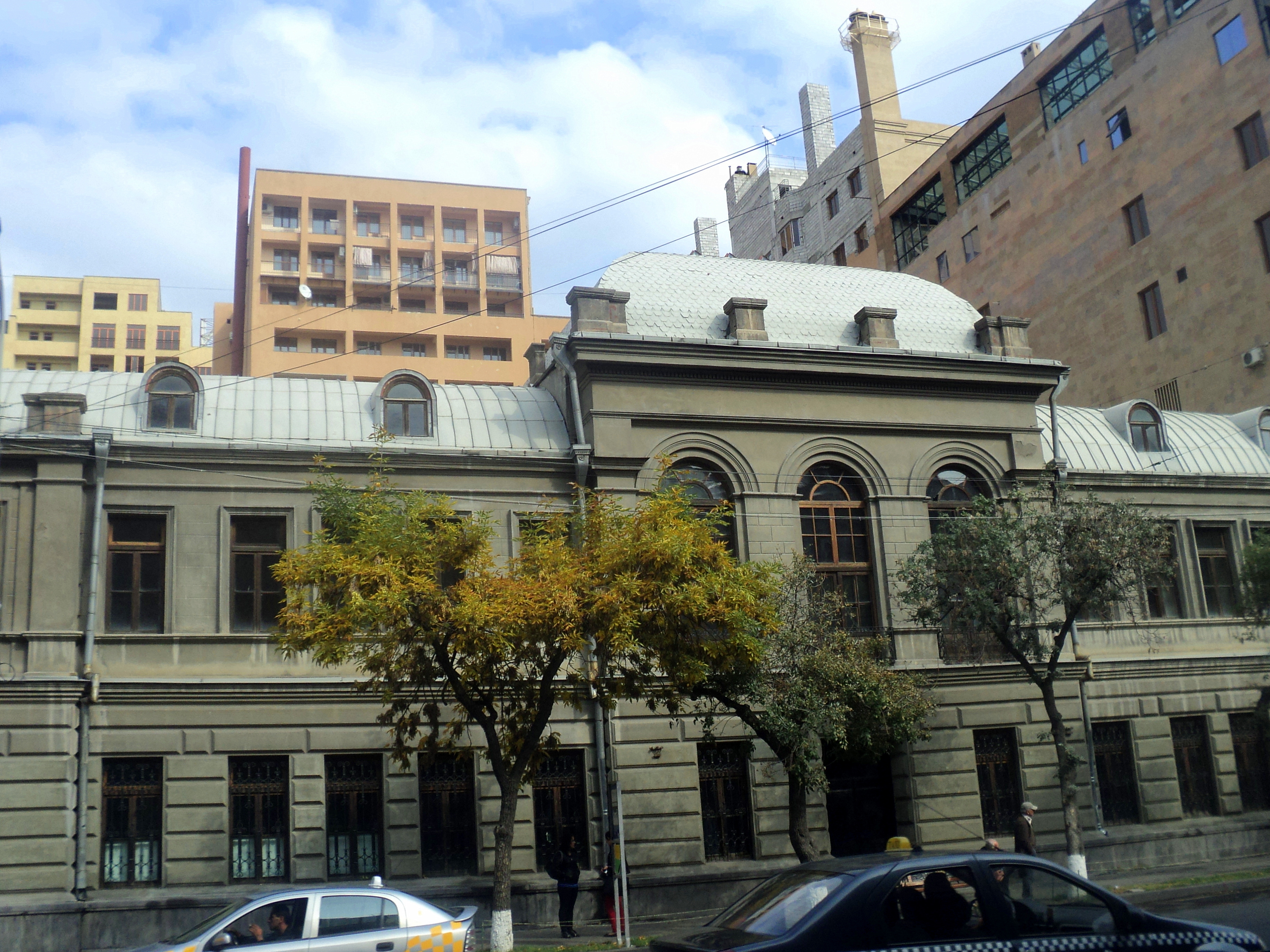
Hripsime School for Girls in Yerevan

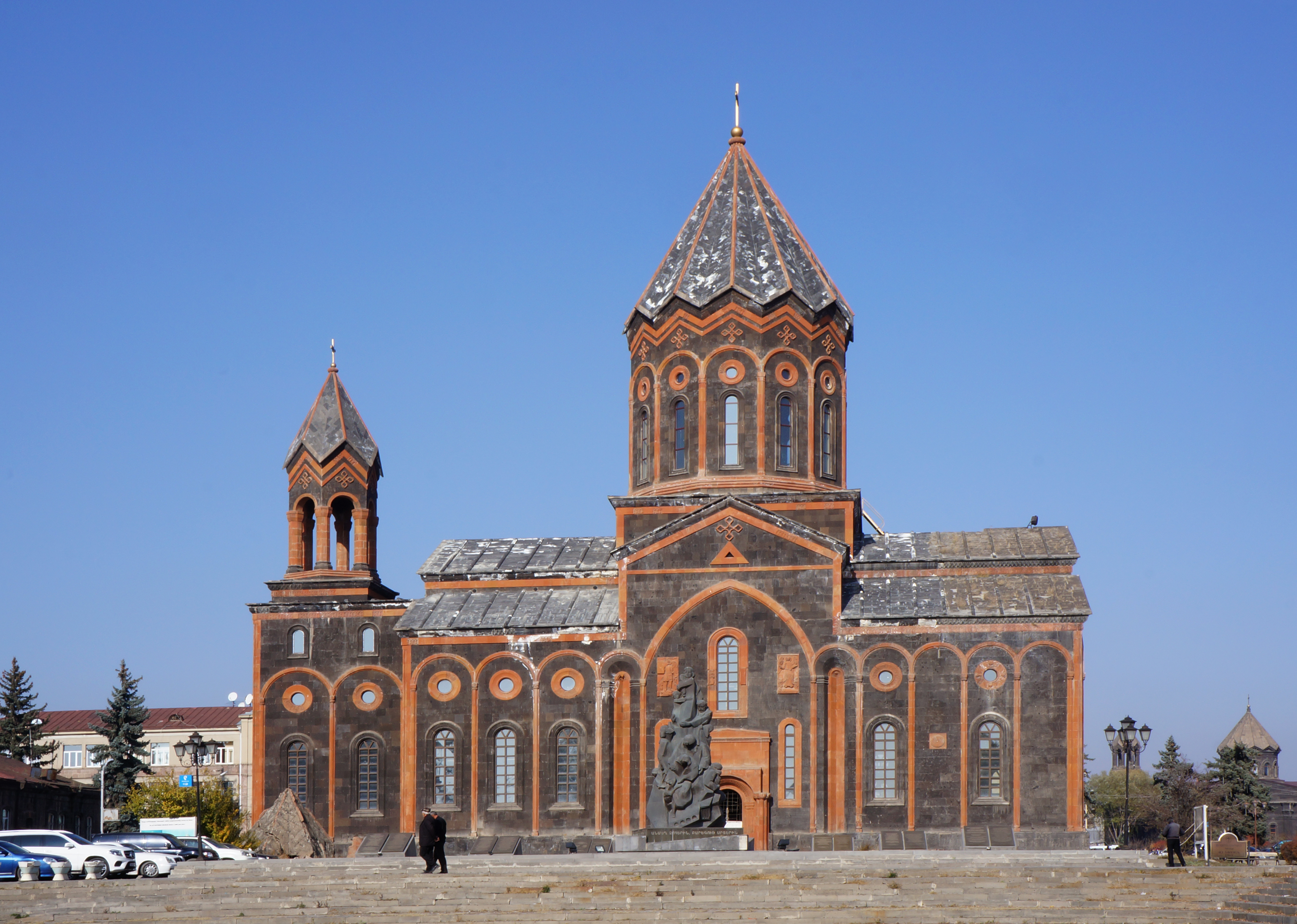
Holy Saviour's Church in Gyumri by Tadeos Andikyan (1858–72)

=== 20th century ===
During the period of the Armenian Soviet Socialist Republic, Socialist Realist architecture was initially the dominant style. The most important buildings from this period include the buildings surrounding Republic Square in Yerevan, the Yerevan Opera Theatre (1930–53) and the Yerevan railway station (1956). In the later period, the modernist style dominated, represented by buildings such as the Writer's House on Lake Sevan (1963–65), the Karen Demirchyan Sports and Concerts Complex (1983), the Rossiya Cinema (1968–74), the Tigran Petrosian Chess House (1970) and the Yeritasardakan metro station in Yerevan (1981). Postmodernism is represented by the Yerevan Cascade (1971–80) and the Yerevan Cathedral (1997–2001).

One of the most prolific architects of Armenian architectural monuments in the 20th century was Baghdasar Arzoumanian. Based in Yerevan, Armenia, he was the author of a great number of civil and church buildings along with other designs.

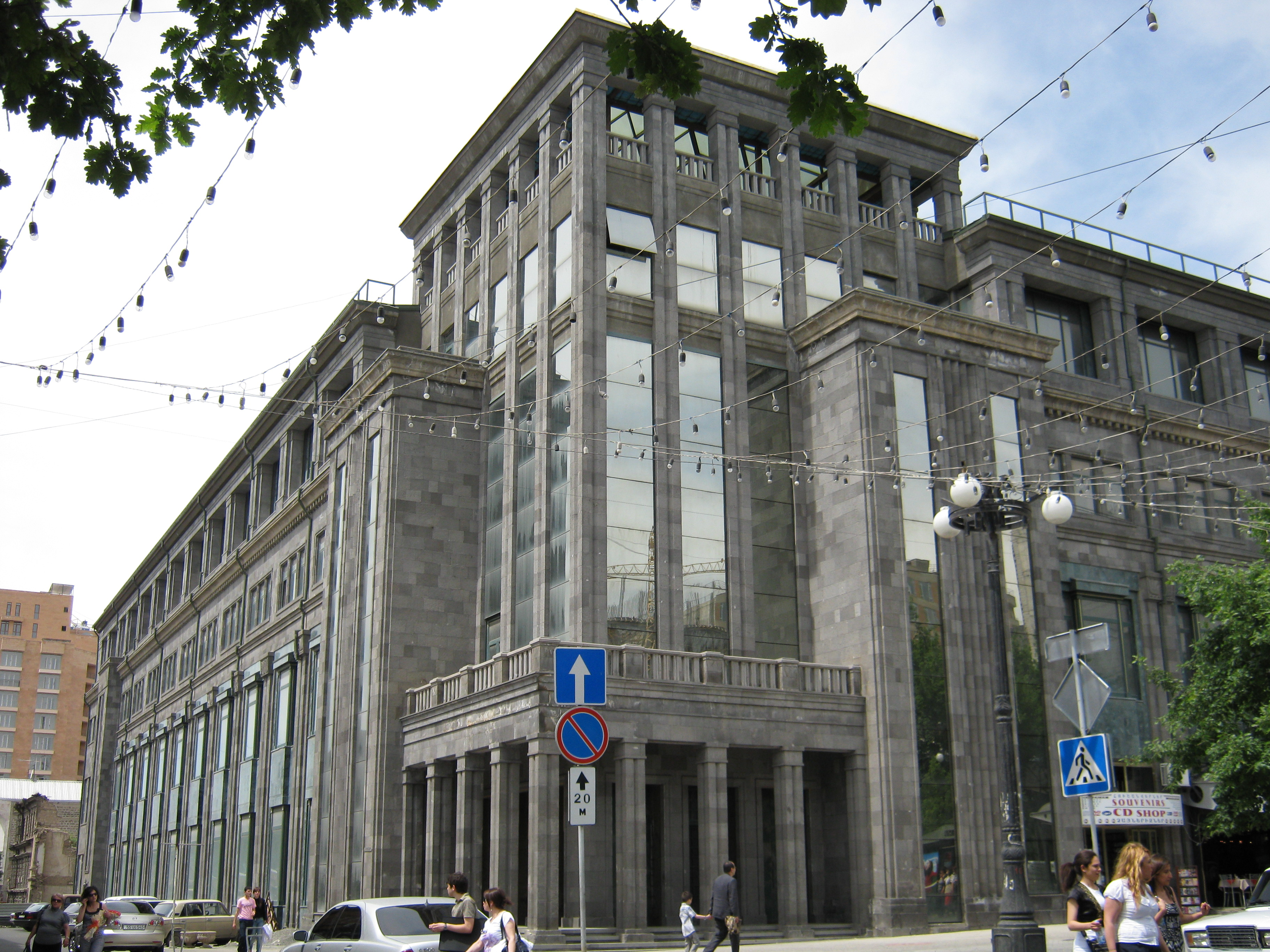
Univermag of Yerevan (1935)

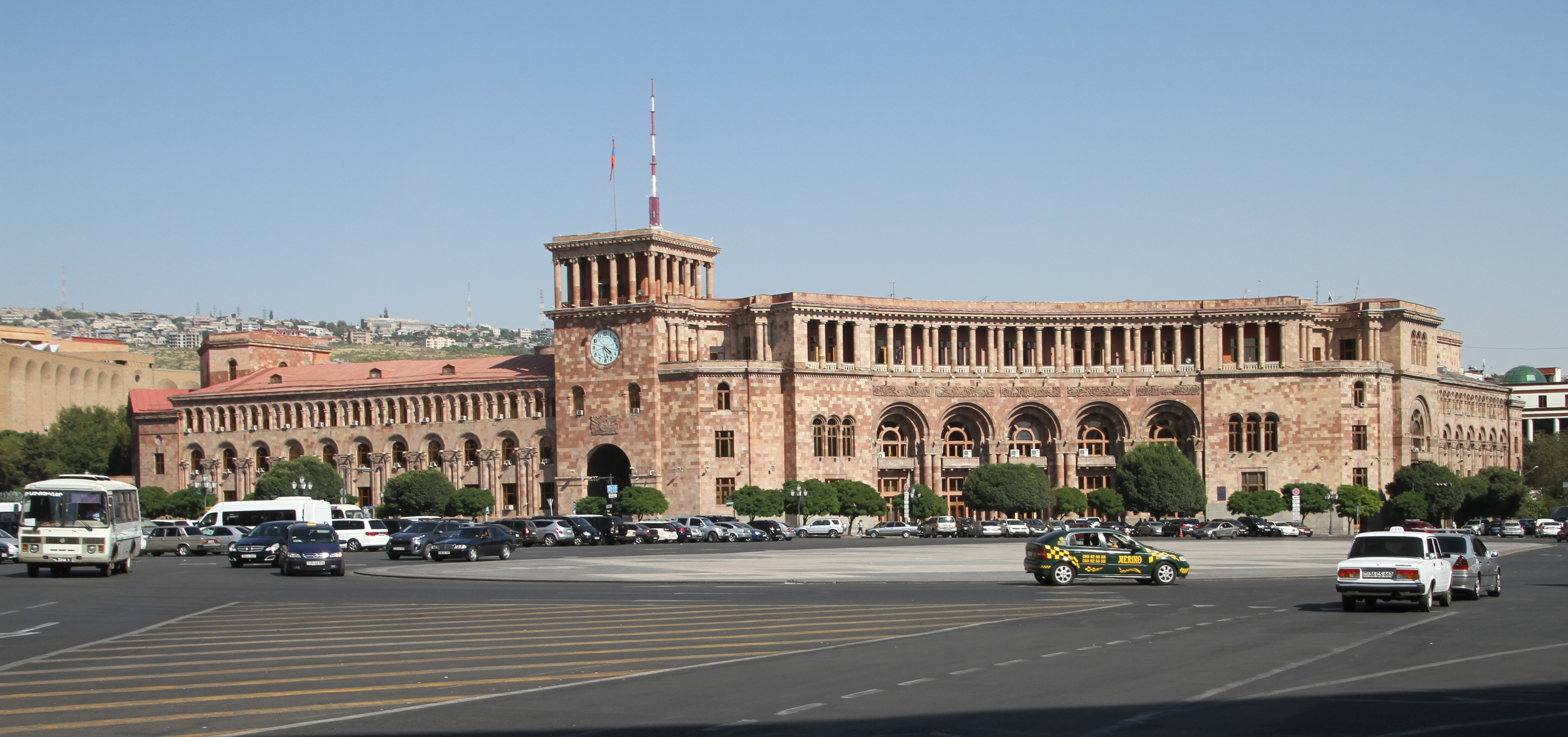
Government House on Republic Square in Yerevan by Alexander Tamanian and by Gevorg Tamanian (1926–41)

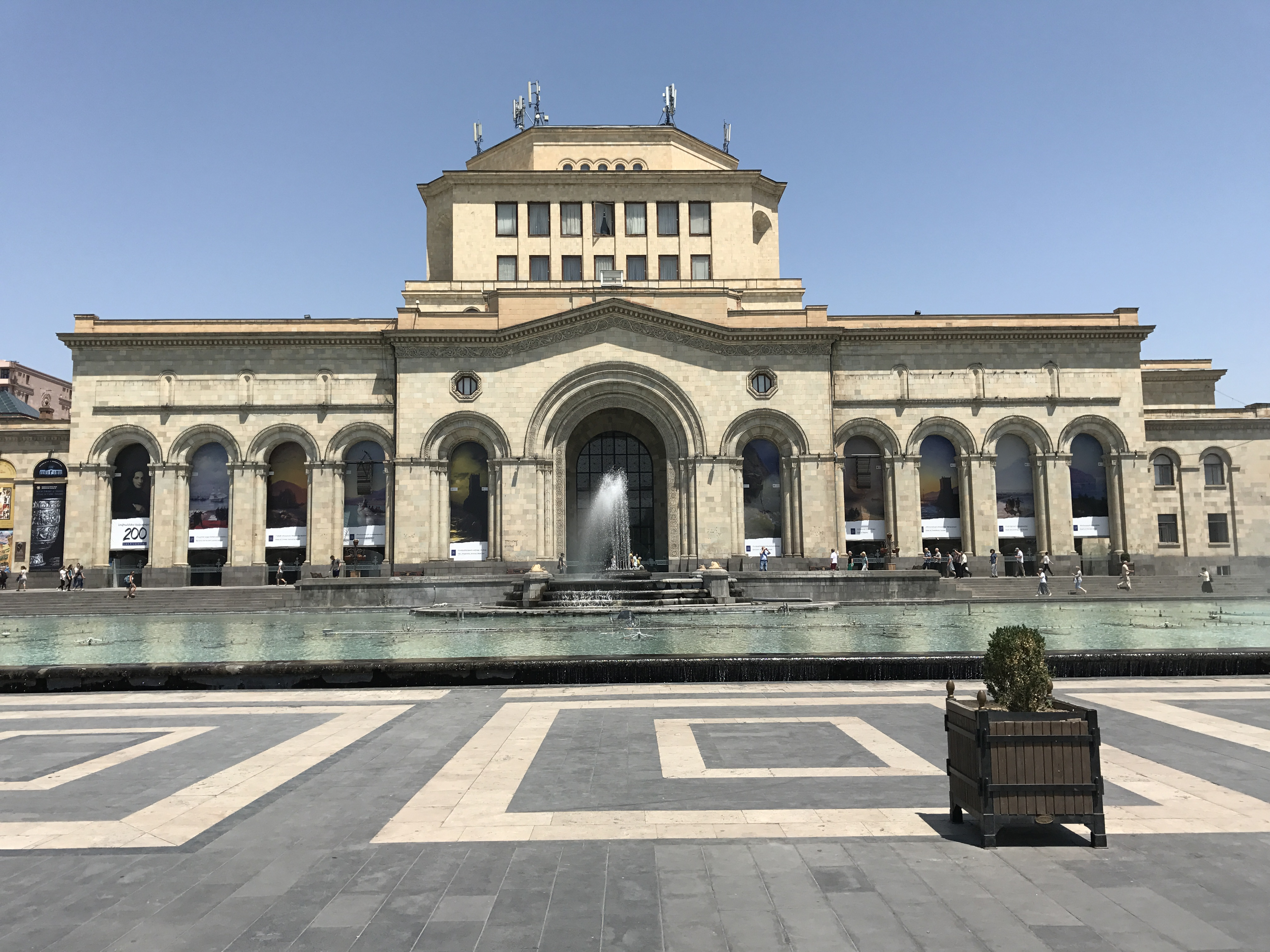
Building of the History Museum of Armenia and the National Gallery of Armenia on Republic Square in Yerevan by Mark Grigorian and Eduard Sarapian (1950s–77)

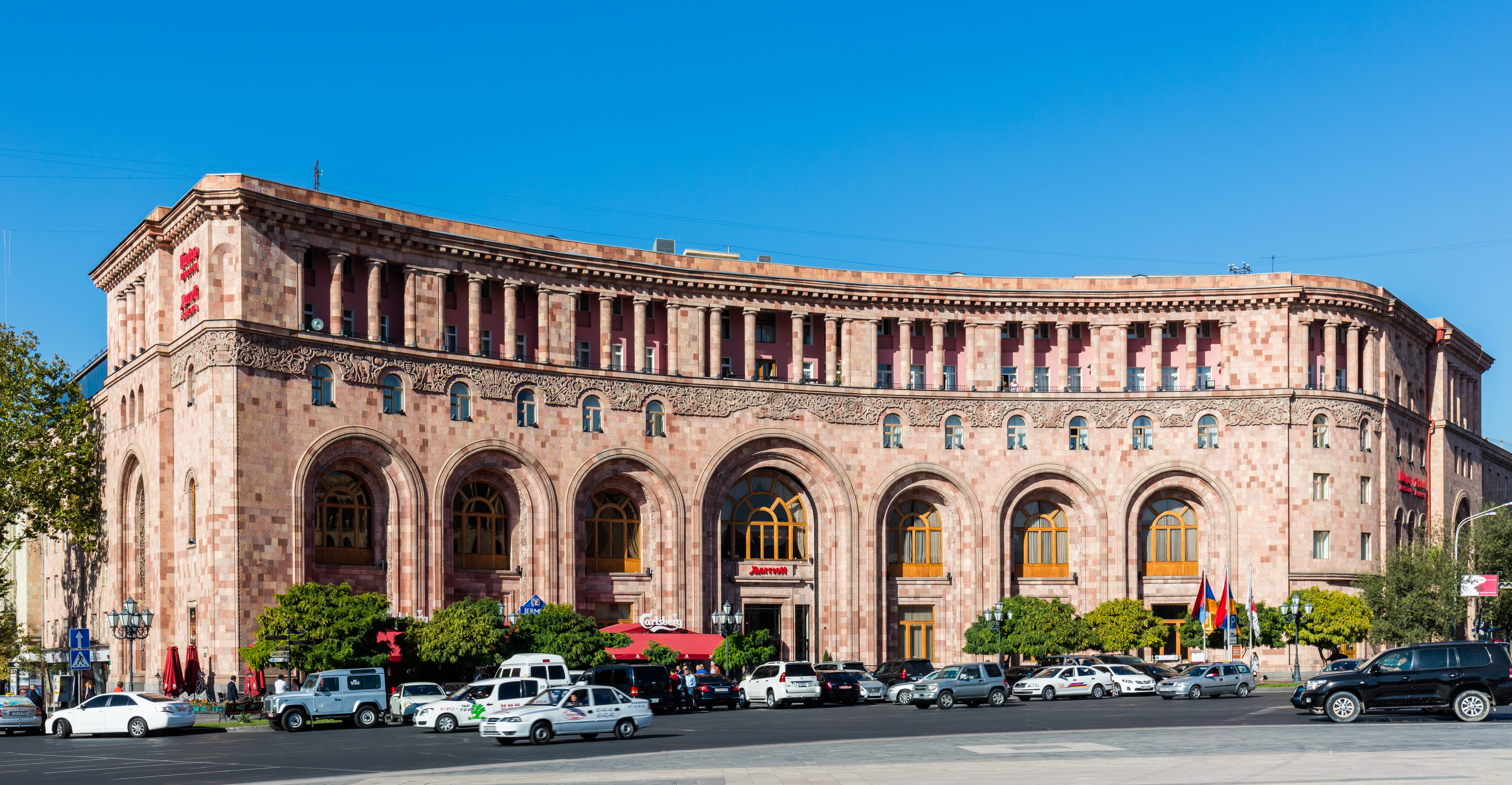
Armenia Hotel on Republic Square in Yerevan by Mark Grigorian and Eduard Sarapian (1958)

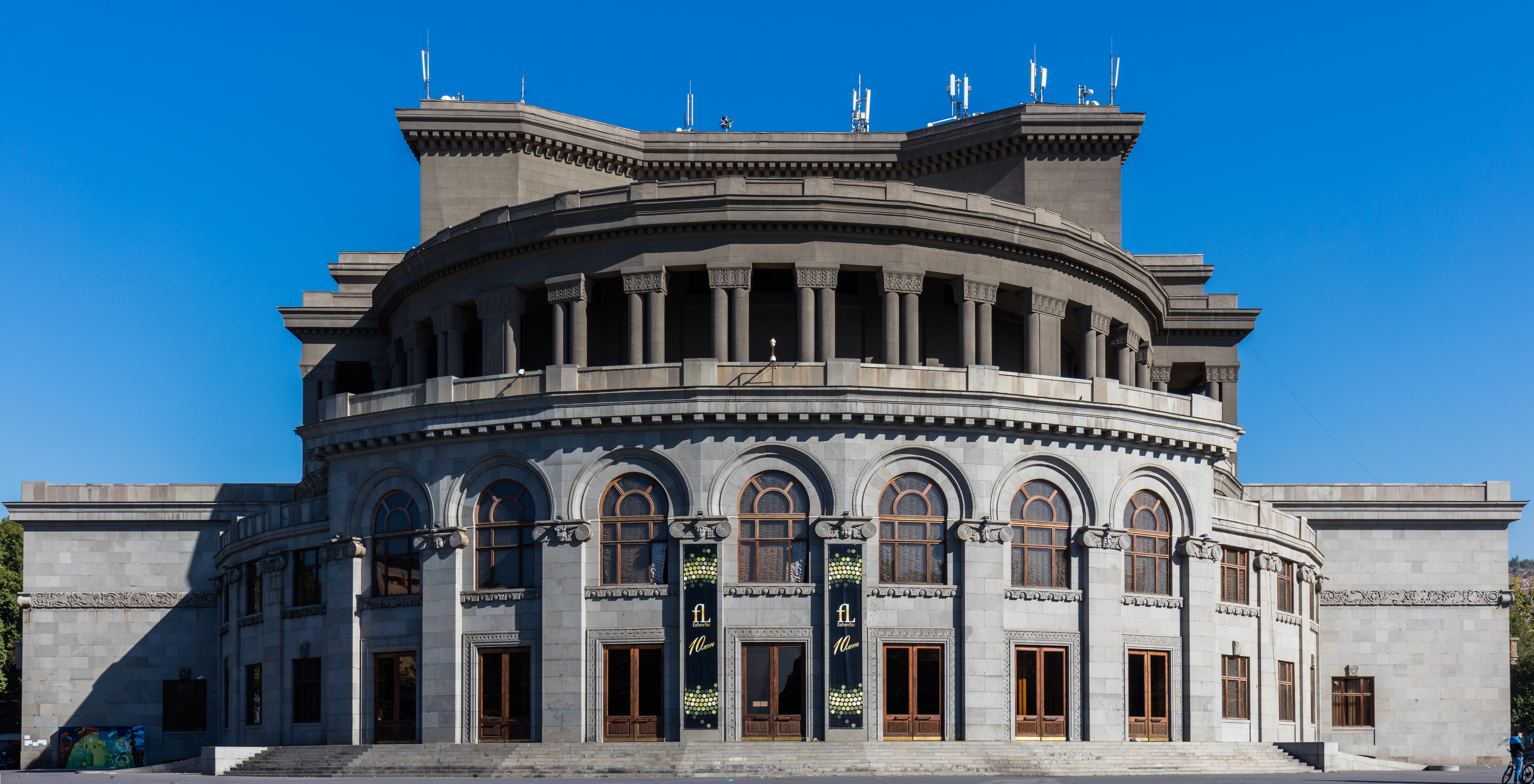
by Alexander Tamanian (1930–53)

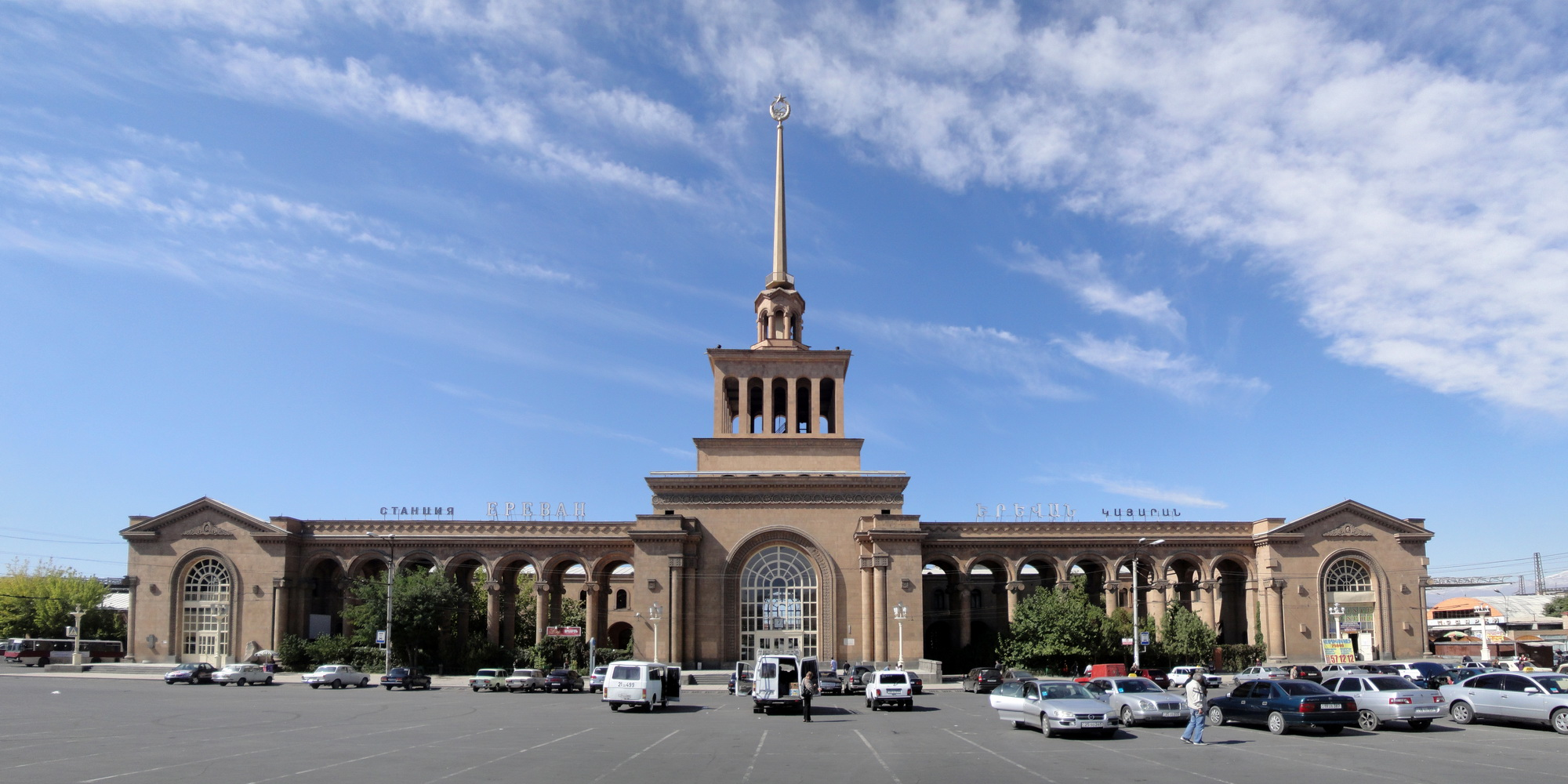
Yerevan railway station (1956)

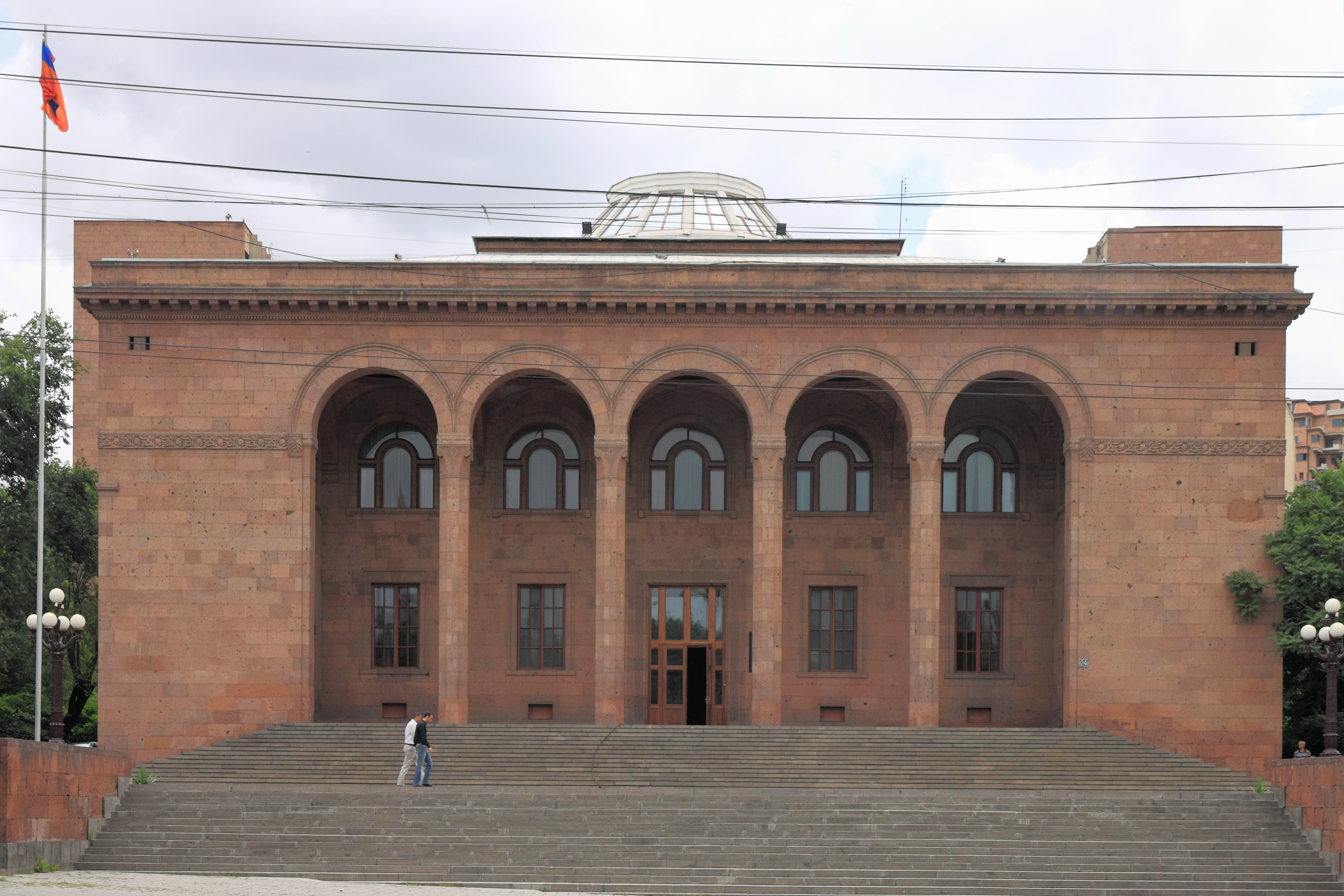
Armenian National Academy of Sciences in Yerevan (1943)

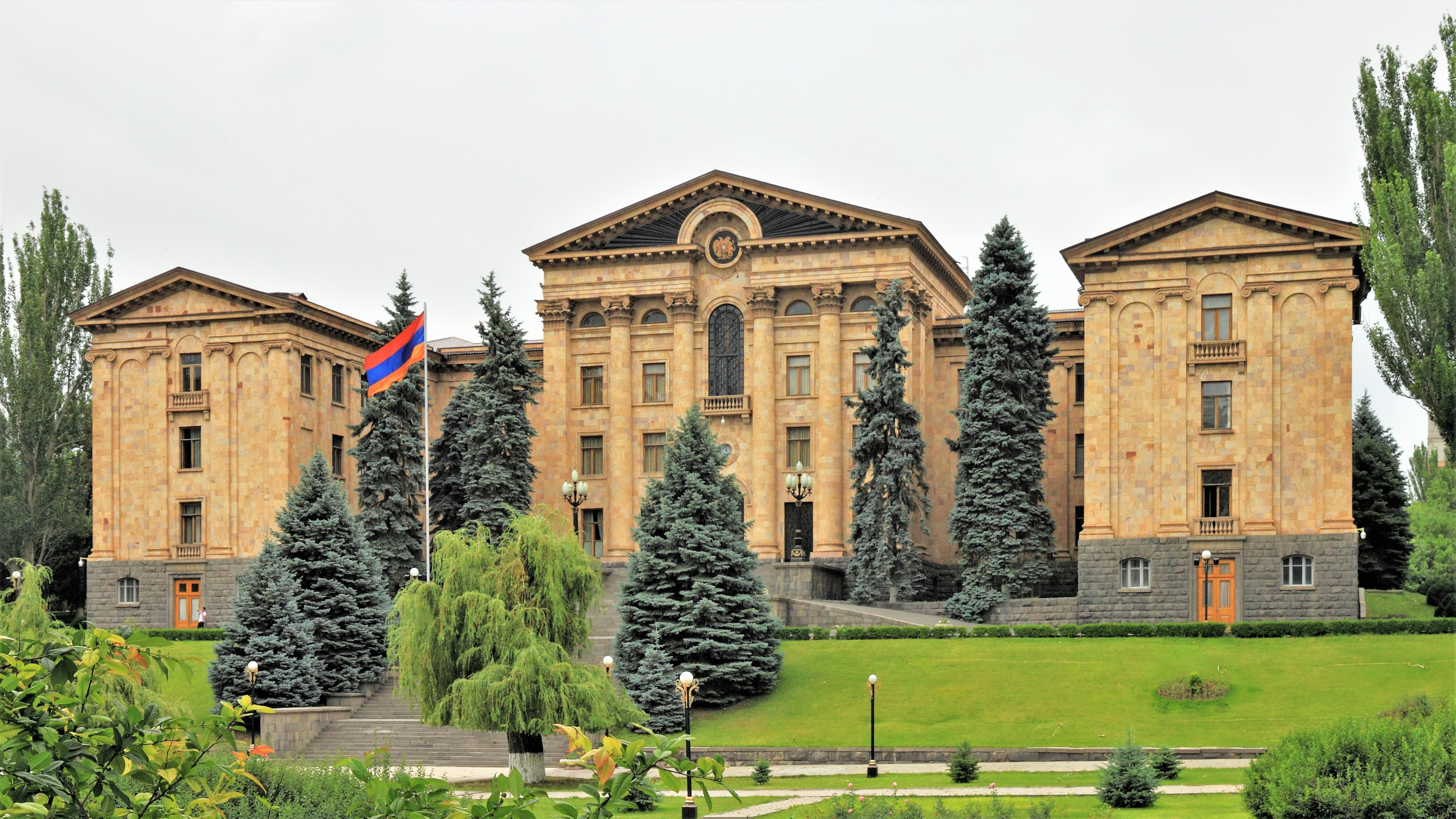
National Assembly of Armenia in Yerevan by Mark Grigorian (1948–50)

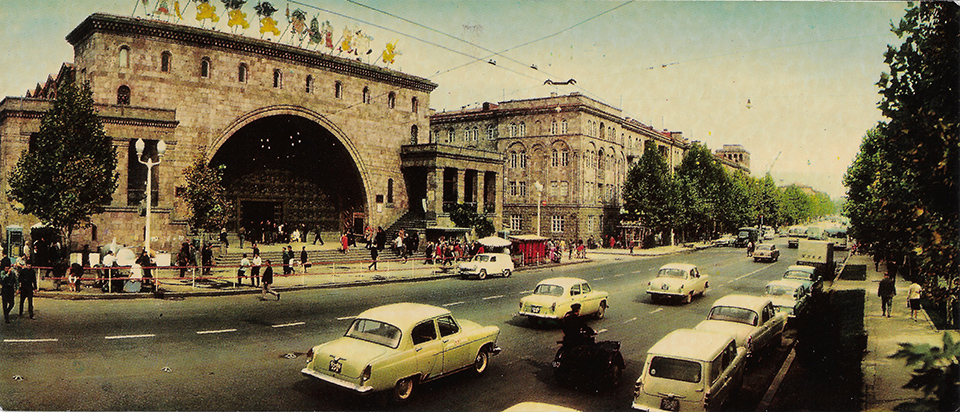
Pak Suka Market Hall in Yerevan (1952)

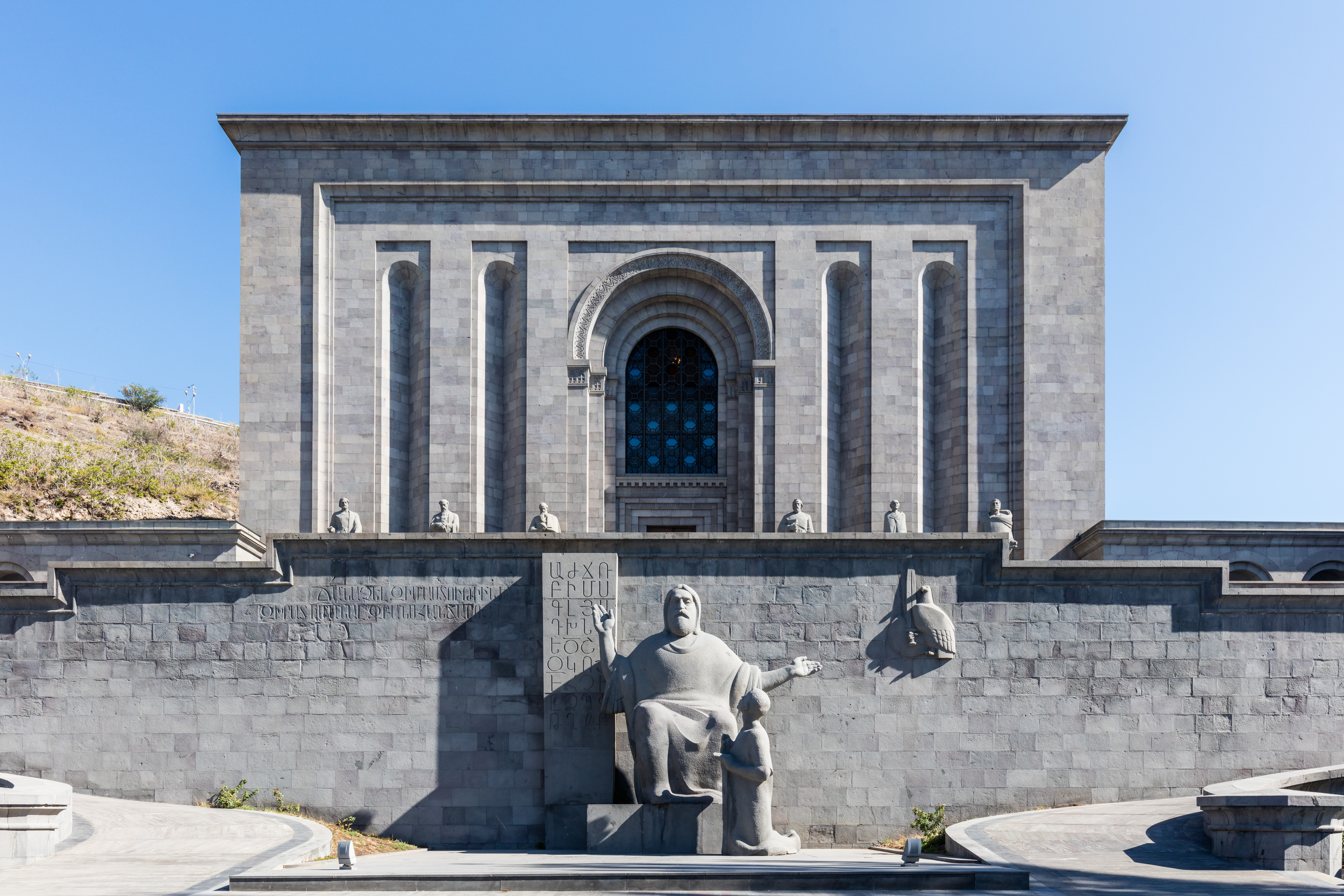
Matenadaran in Yerevan by Mark Grigorian (1958)

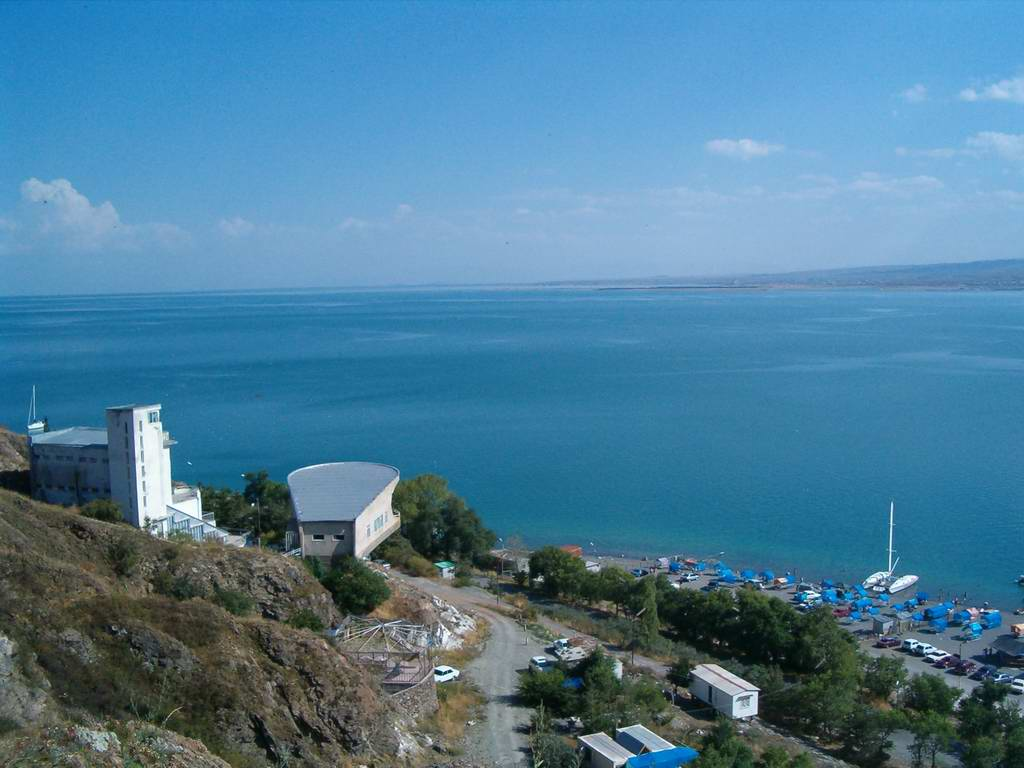
Writer's House on Lake Sevan (1963–65)

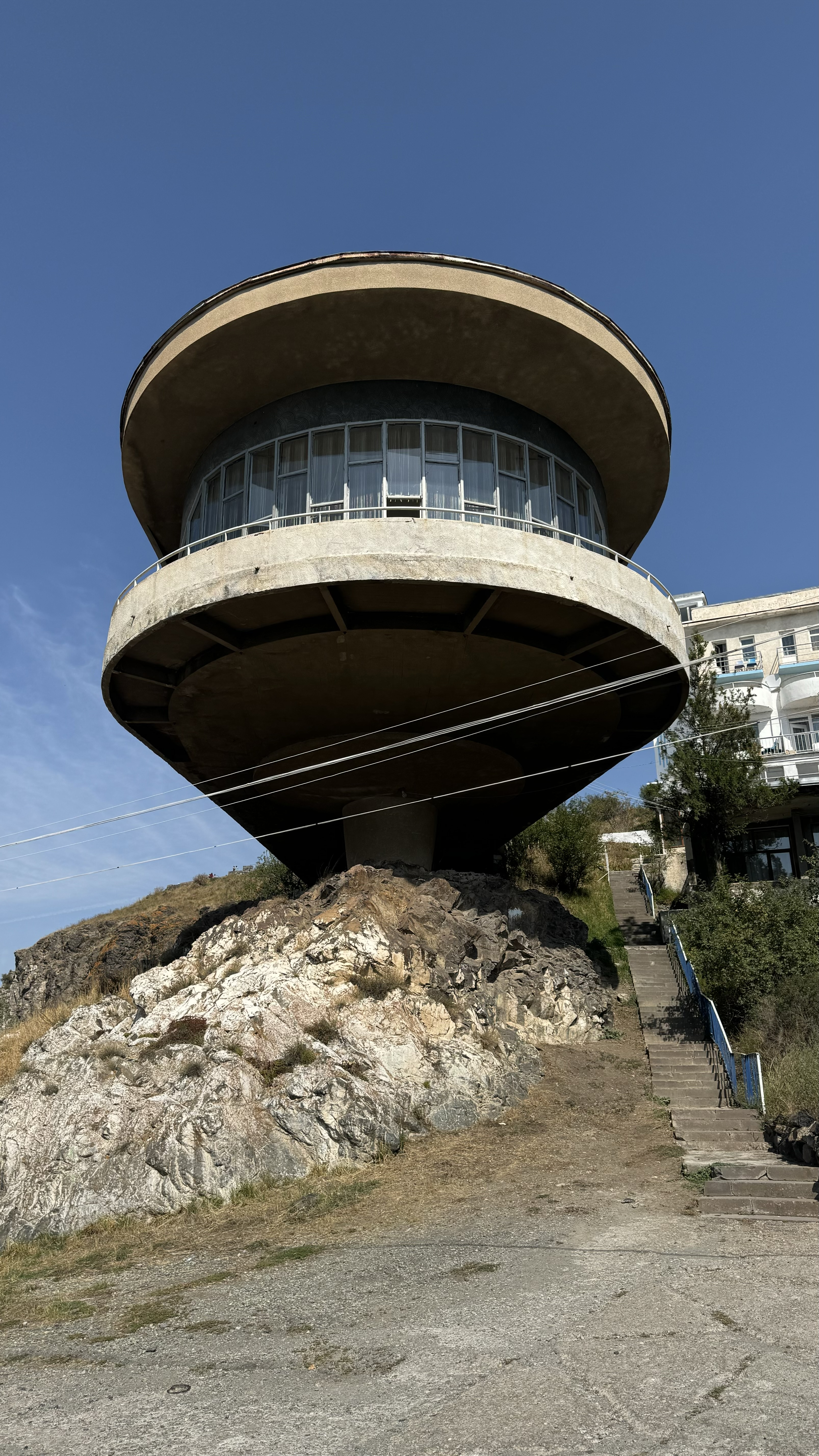
Writer's House on Lake Sevan (1963–65)

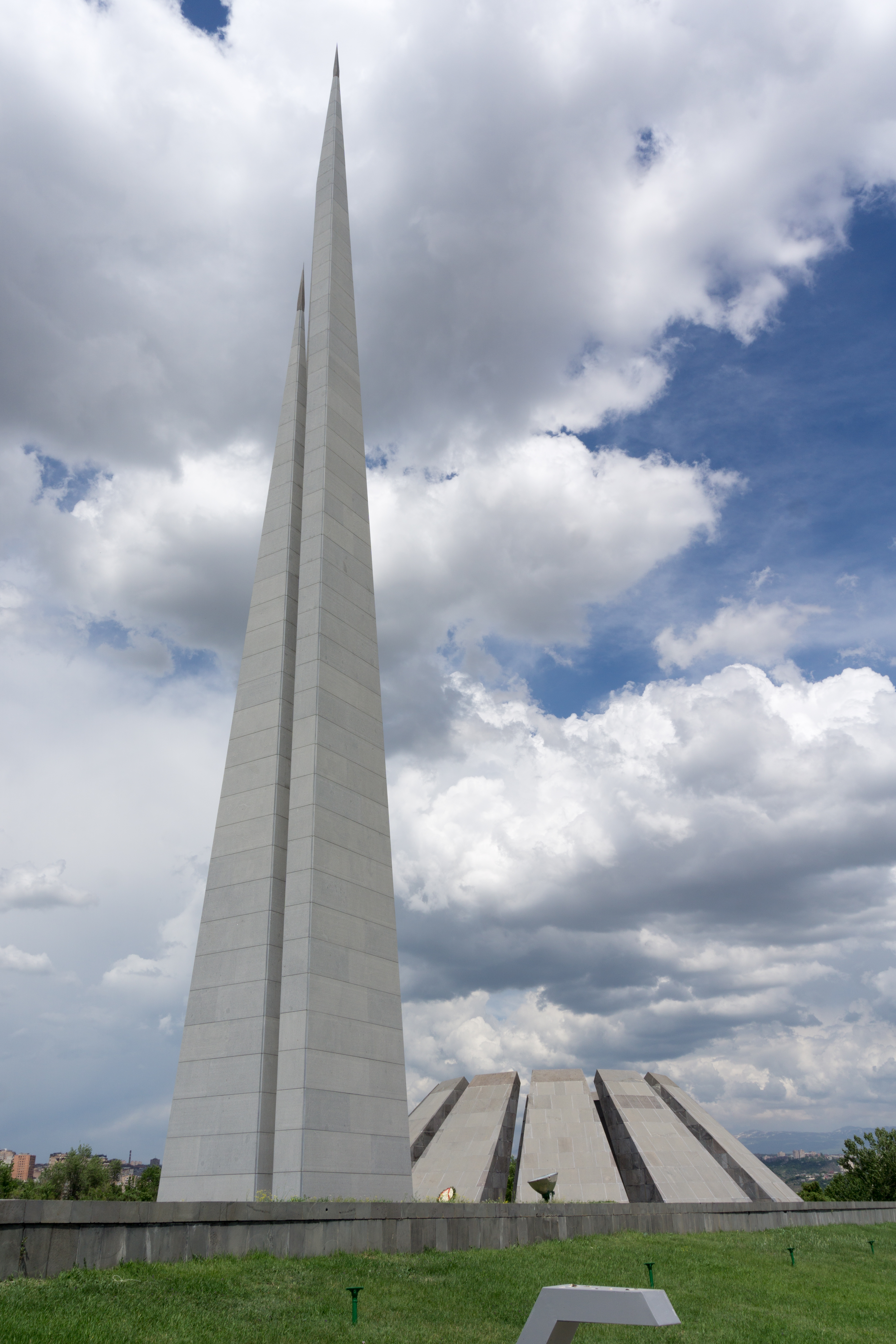
Armenian Genocide Memorial complex in Yerevan (1967)

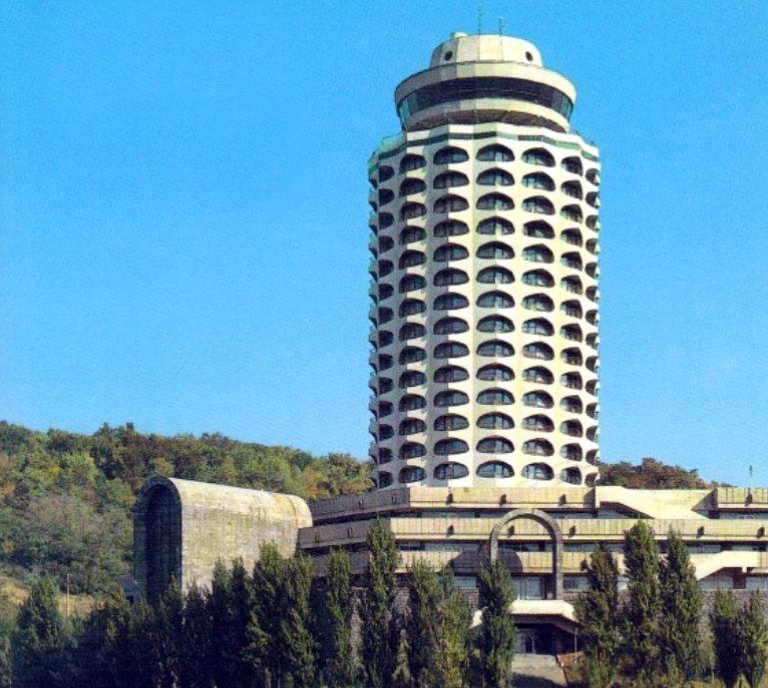
Yerevan Youth Palace (1970)

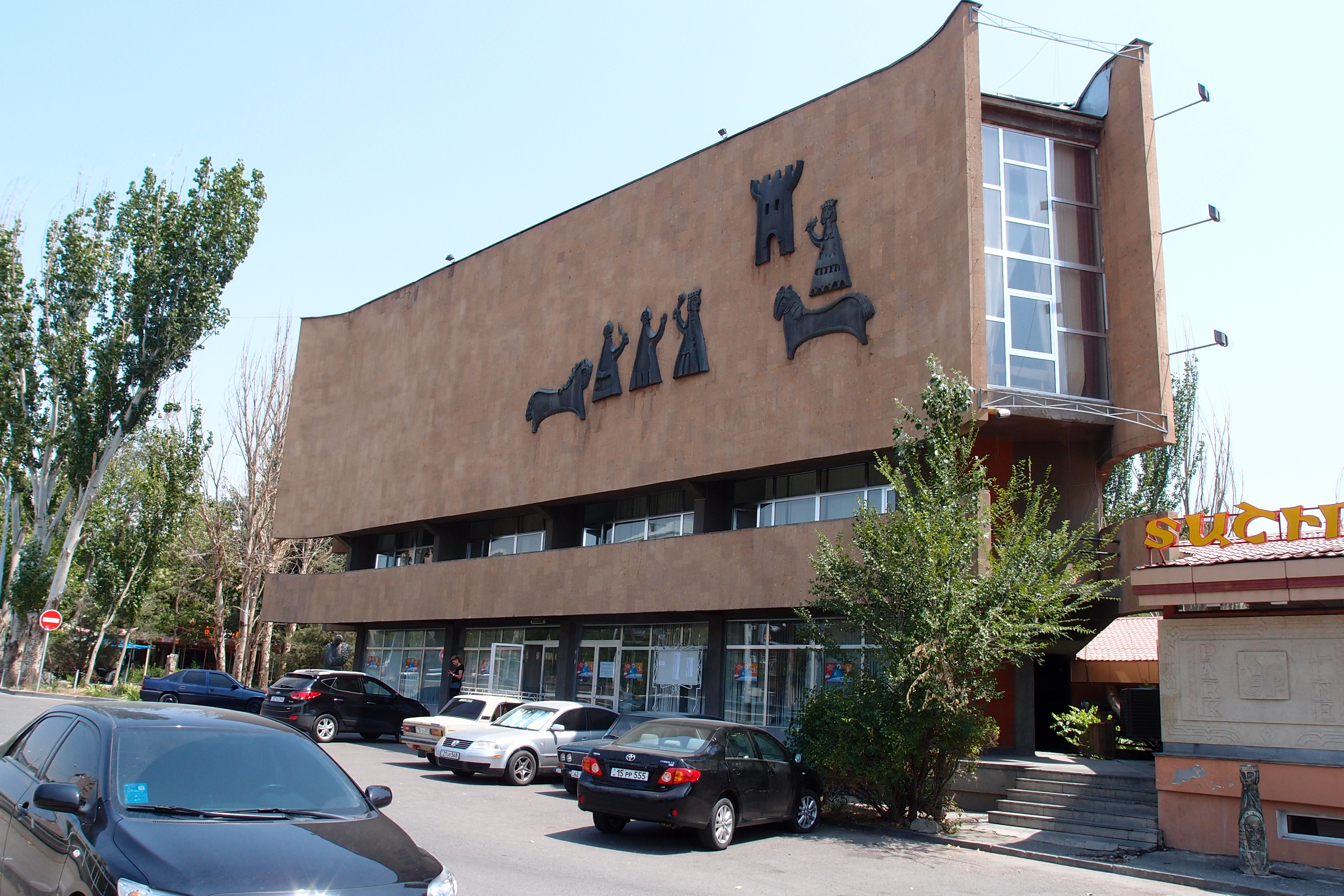
Tigran Petrosian Chess House in Yerevan (1970)

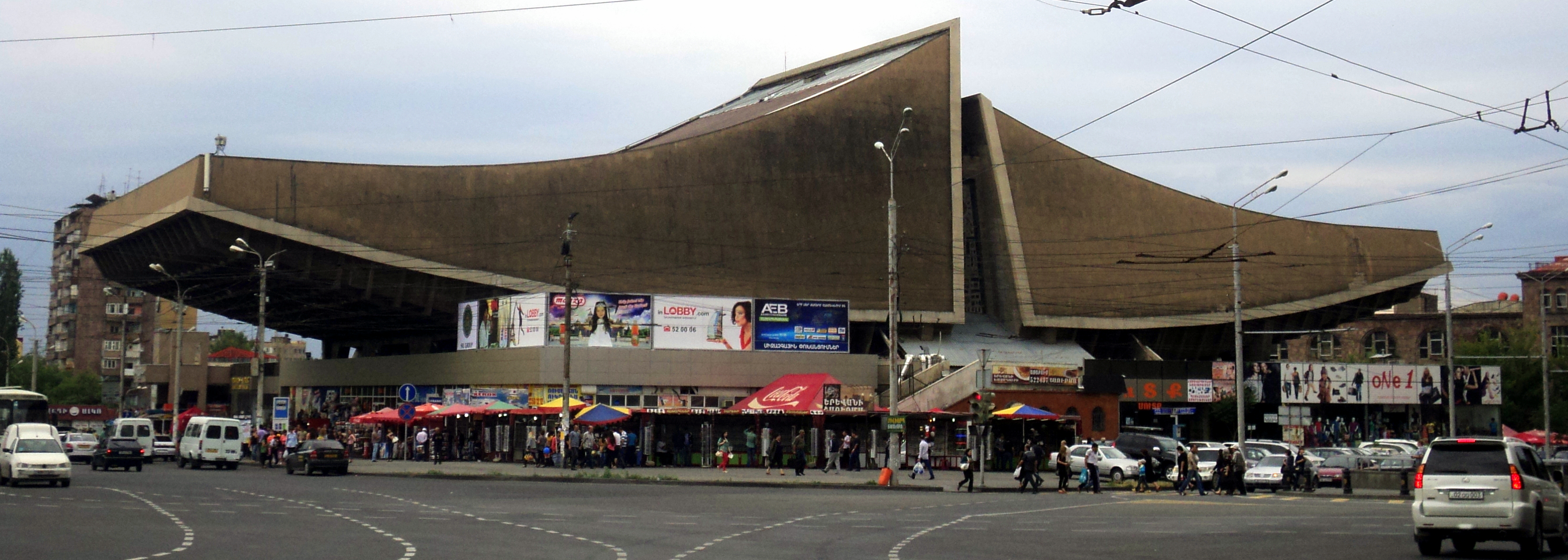
Rossiya Cinema (1968–74)

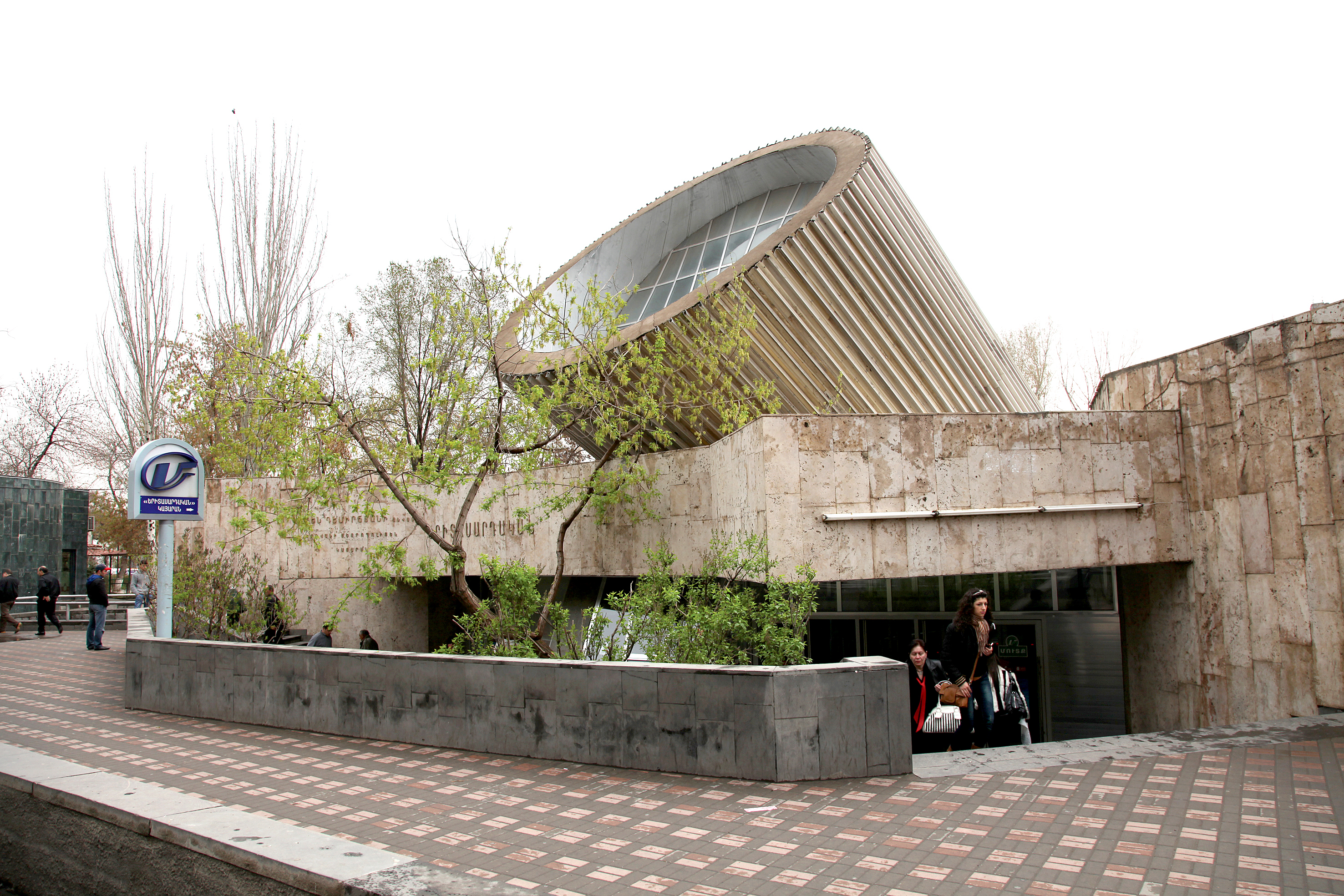
Yeritasardakan metro station in Yerevan (1981)

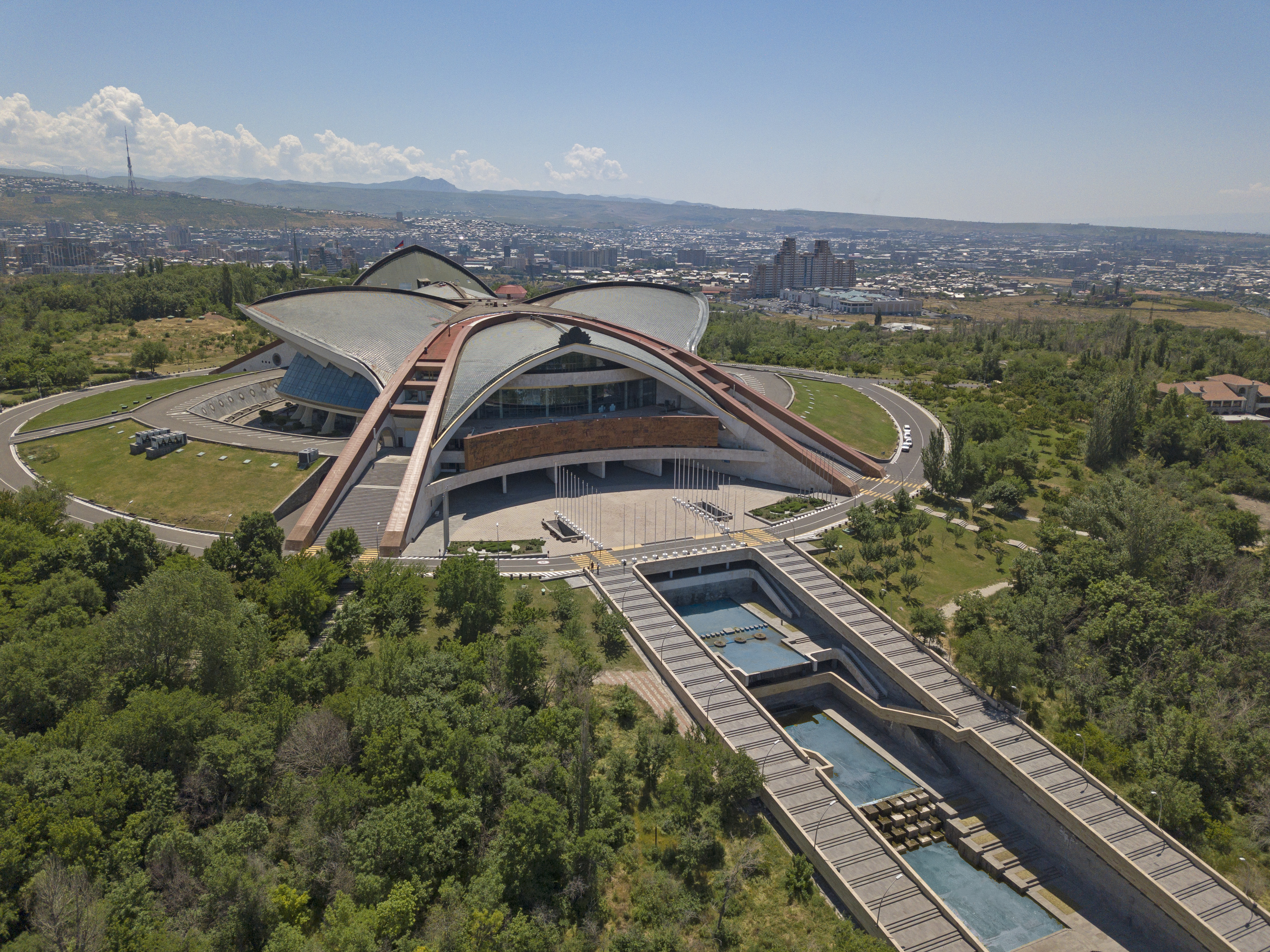
Karen Demirchyan Sports and Concerts Complex (1983)

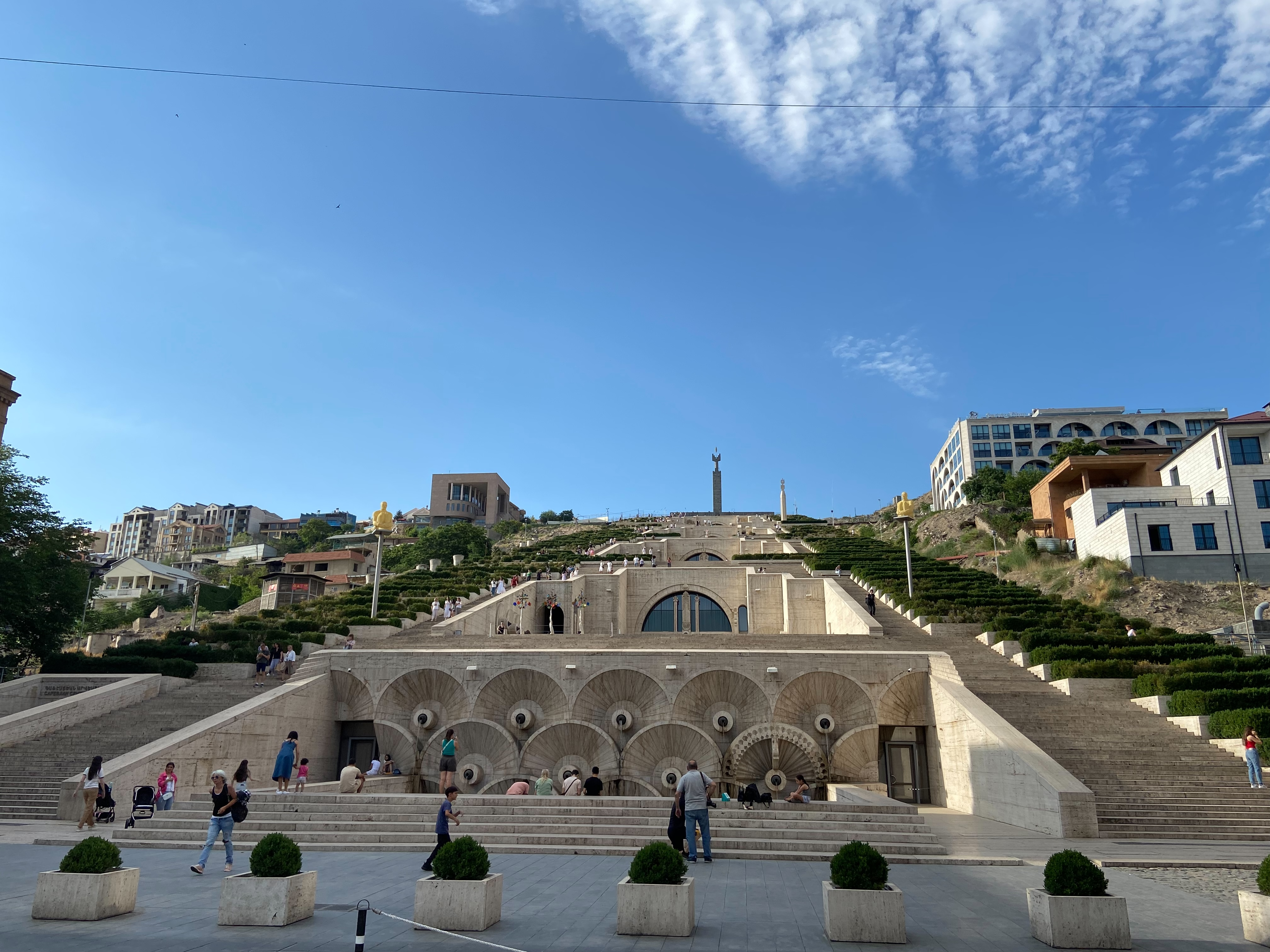
Yerevan Cascade (1971–80)

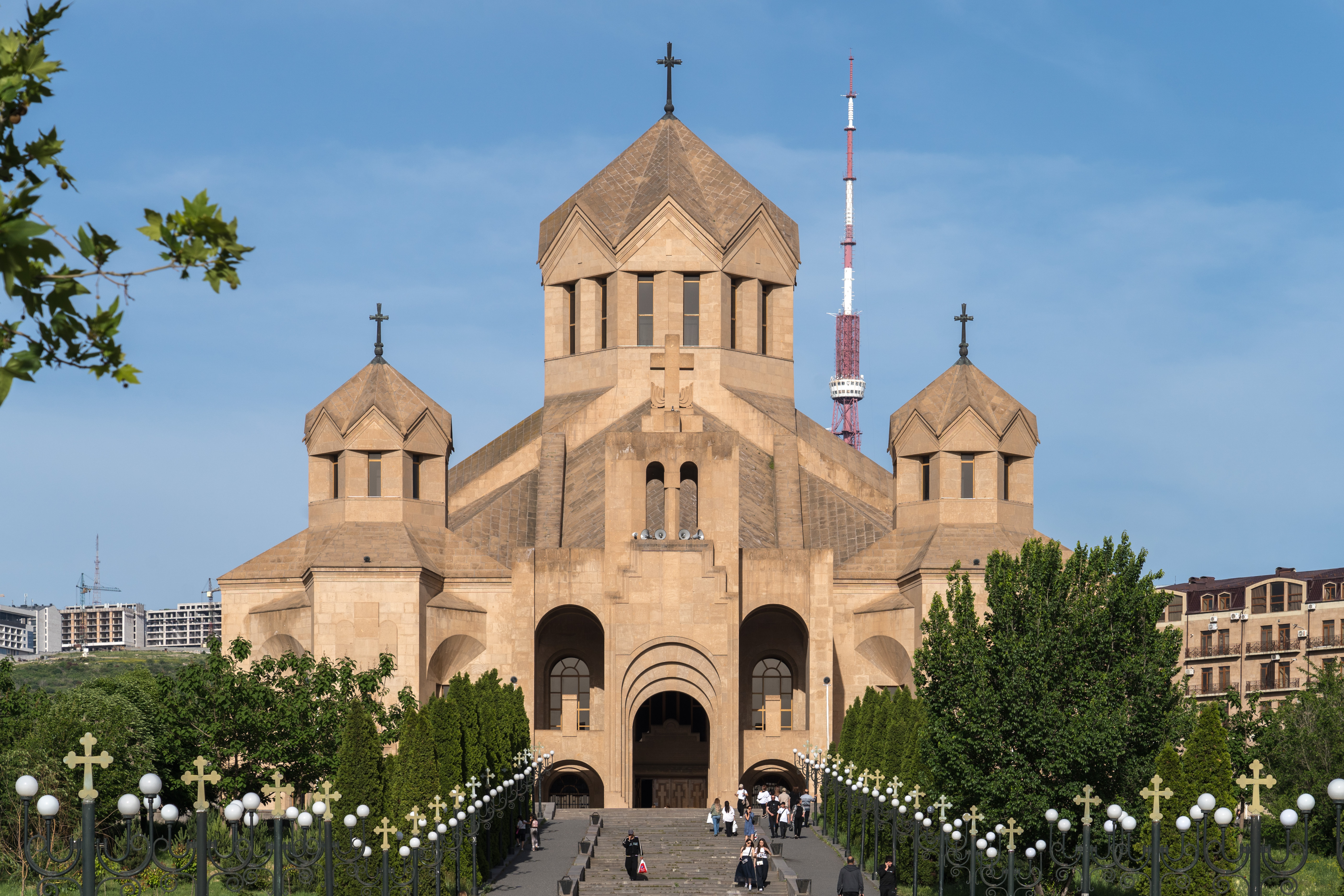
Yerevan Cathedral by Stepan Kurkchyan (1997–2001)

== Devastation of Armenian architecture ==
The Vanatoon monastic residence in Etchmiadzin by Baghdasar Arzoumanian.

As a result of Anti-Armenianism, relics of Armenia's past such as churches, cemeteries and khachkars in neighboring countries have been subject to devastation. In certain cases such as in Turkey or Azerbaijan, this had been as a result of national campaigns to eradicate traces of the Armenian people to thwart any potential claims by the Armenian state.

The largest collection in the world was formerly to be found at the ruins of Old Jugha in Nakhichevan (today's Azerbaijan). Reports (see RFE/RL) and photographs from observers in Iranian territory emerged at the end of 2005 showing Azeri soldiers making deliberate attempts to destroy the gravestones. More recent photographs have revealed that the entire graveyard has been obliterated and a military training ground has been constructed on the site.

Due to the endless development and neglect, the historical architecture of Yerevan is often desecrated or in some cases demolished. One of the most noticeable cases was the creation of Northern Avenue in Yerevan as per original plans of Alexander Tamanian, which destroyed the rich architectural heritage located in the area. There are also plans going on to destroy the historical district of Noragyugh to build a business center called "New Yerevan".

== Vernacular architecture of Armenia ==
Armenia has a rich tradition of vernacular architecture, which varies by region. Out of them the most noticeable surviving examples are the following:

- In Syunik region Armenians used to live in carved out cave dwellings with decorated entrances. Between 12 and 25 people lived in each cave, depending on the economic status of the family, with the complex network of ropes, ladders and narrow pathways connecting each dwelling. The examples of this style can be found in the old parts of Khot, Khndzoresk, Shinuhayr and Halidzor villages, as well as in Meghri and Goris cities.
- In Dilijan the local vernacular architecture is a product synthesis between the Armenian architecture of Tbilisi and Baku and the Molokan architecture due to the high Molokan and Tbilisi Armenian population living in the city. The architecture of Dilijan consisted of one- or rarely two-story housing, made of uncut gray basalt and sandy limestone. The windows and doorways of the houses were covered with arches traditional to Armenia, and high gabled roofs were covered with roofing tiles due to the abundance of precipitation.
- The vernacular architecture of Yerevan is primarily represented by the historical Kond district, as well as the integrated villages of Old Nork, Kanaker and Noragyugh. Demirbulagh and Dzoragyugh districts, which also represented the vernaculars of Yerevan, were mostly demolished, as can be seen on the architectural plan of Tamanian. The vernaculars of Yerevan are characterised by simple wooden balconies, narrow streets and terraces, which are often situated on top of the other houses due to the mountainous terrain.
- The vernaculars of Lori region in Armenia are similar to the vernaculars of Dilijan, though they are more sparse due to the major reconstruction of the capital of the region, Vanadzor, by Soviets, which almost entirely destroyed its vernacular heritage. Traditional housing in Lori is almost exclusively one-story and has white plastered walls, representing the unique combination of cultures. Nowadays, probably the best example of the architecture of that region is the house-museum of Stepan Shaumian in Stepanavan.
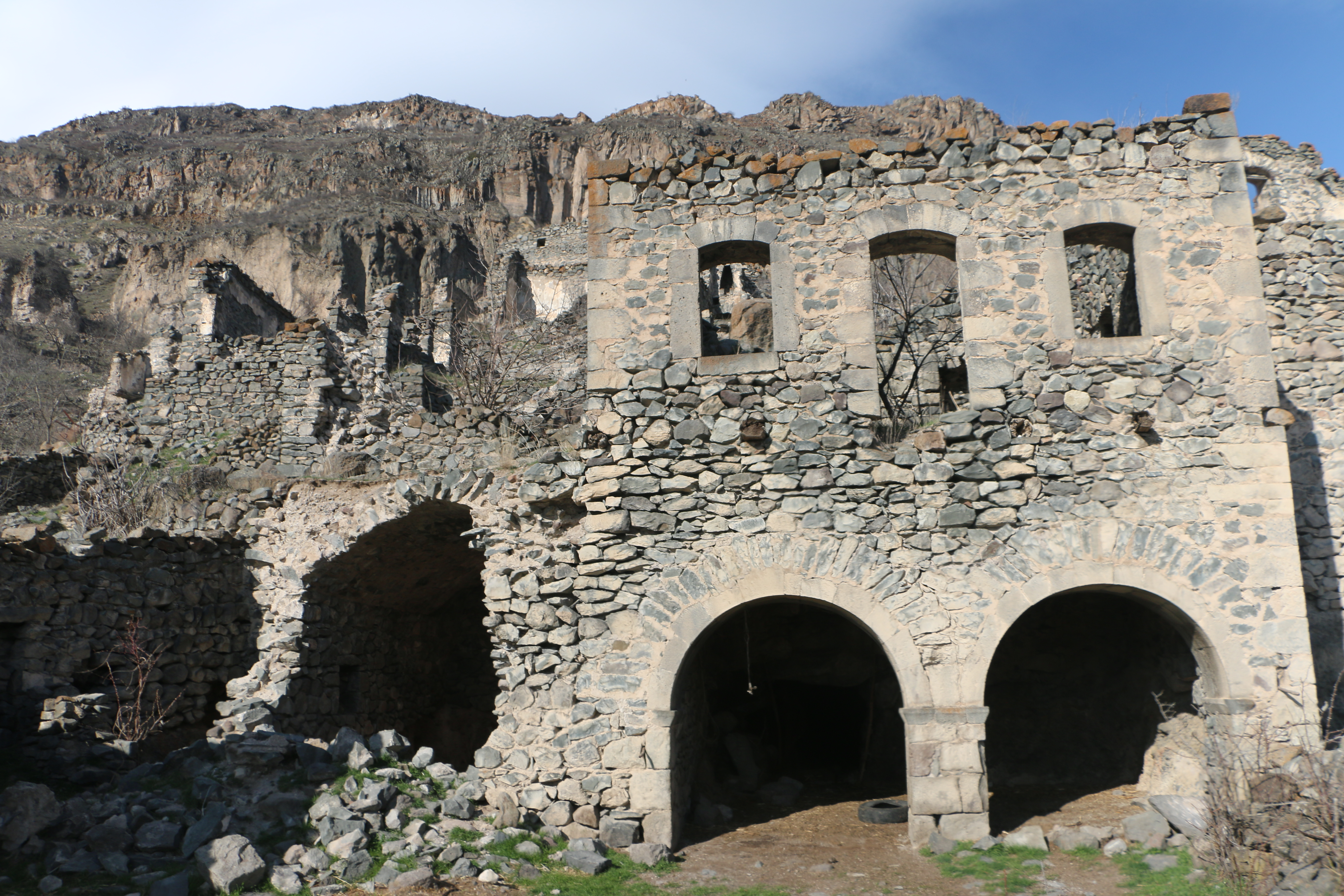
House in the old part of Khot village of Syunik.

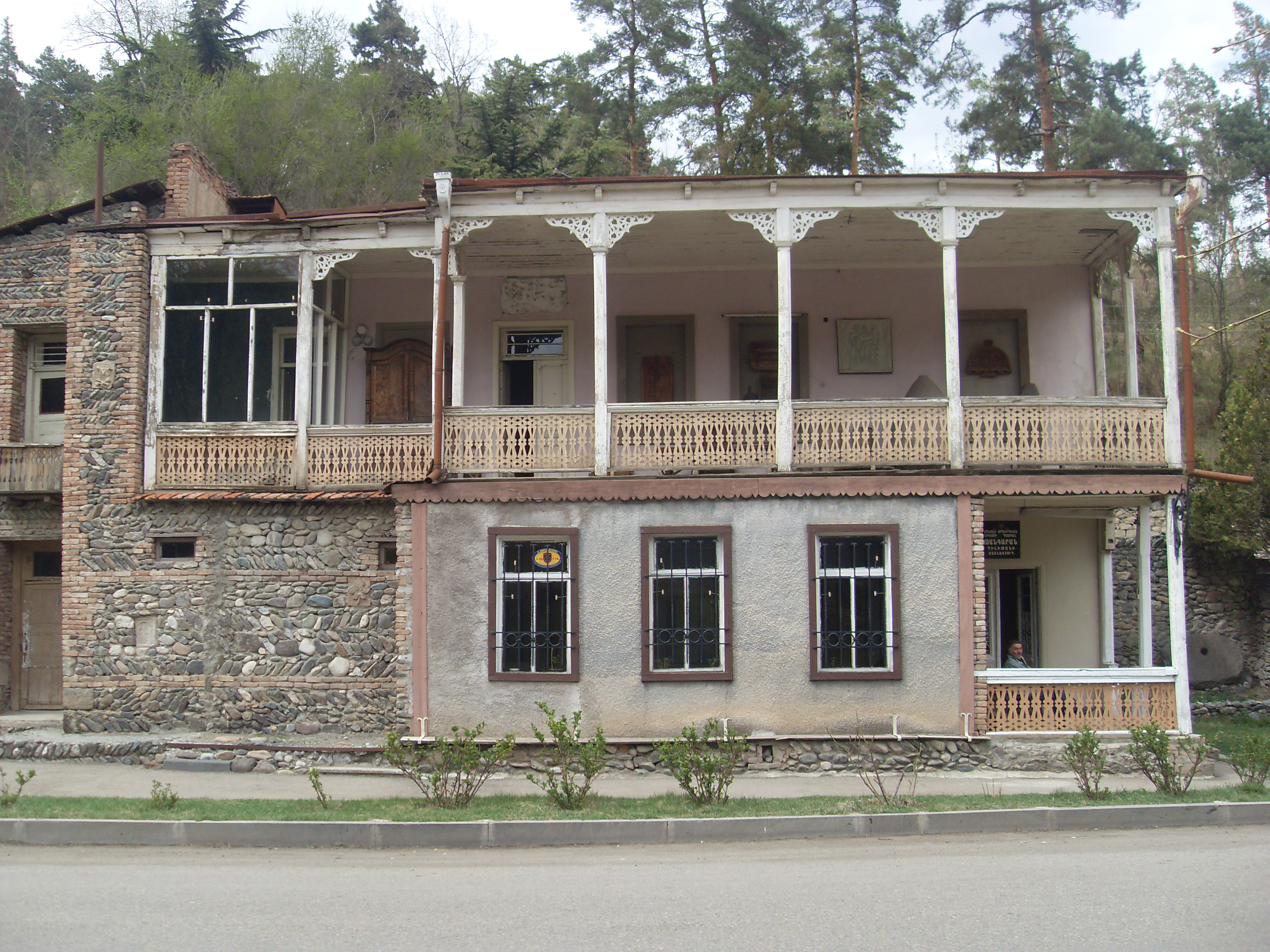
Traditional house in Dilijan.

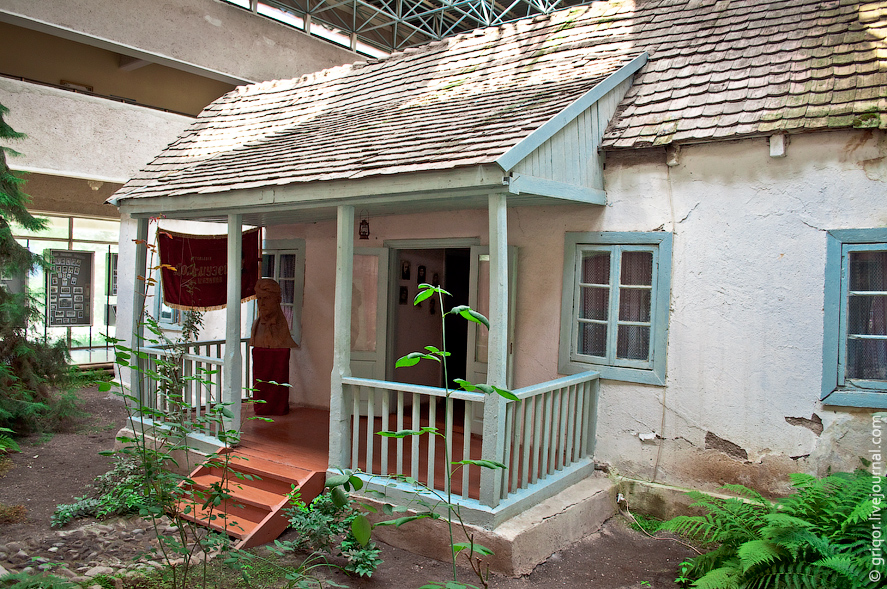
House of Shaumian, Stepanavan, Lori.

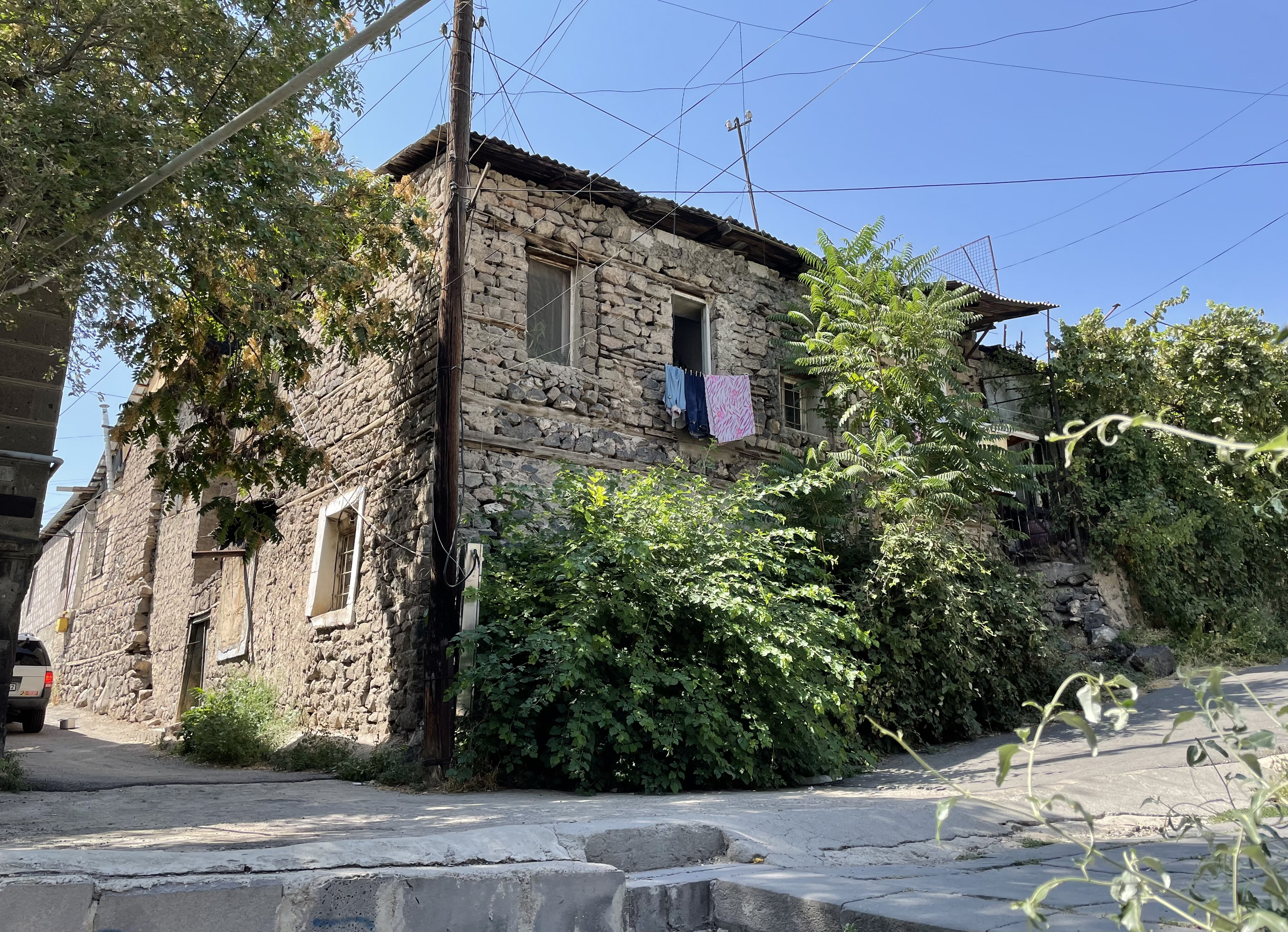
Old house in the Kond district of Yerevan.

== Armenian architecture in the diaspora ==
The tumultuous past of Armenia over the last millennium has resulted in the formation of an extensive Armenian diaspora in various corners of the globe. Armenian communities seeking to keep the traditions of their homeland, influenced the architectural vernacular of Armenian Quarters in cities such as Zamość and Lviv. This influence is most evident in the sacred architecture of churches built by the Armenian community, where designs based on historic landmarks such as the cathedrals of Ani, Zvartnots and Etchmiadzin have been used as inspirational templates to construct these structures in their new surroundings. This tradition still continues into the present day as Armenian immigration has shifted away from the traditional areas of outmigration in Europe and the Middle East into the Americas and Australia.

Khachkars have also become additional signifiers of Armenian identity and have been erected in recent year in cities such as Wrocław, Kraków, Elbląg in Poland, Novi Sad in Serbia, Beirut in Lebanon as well as in Dearborn, Michigan.

== UNESCO designated World Heritage Sites ==
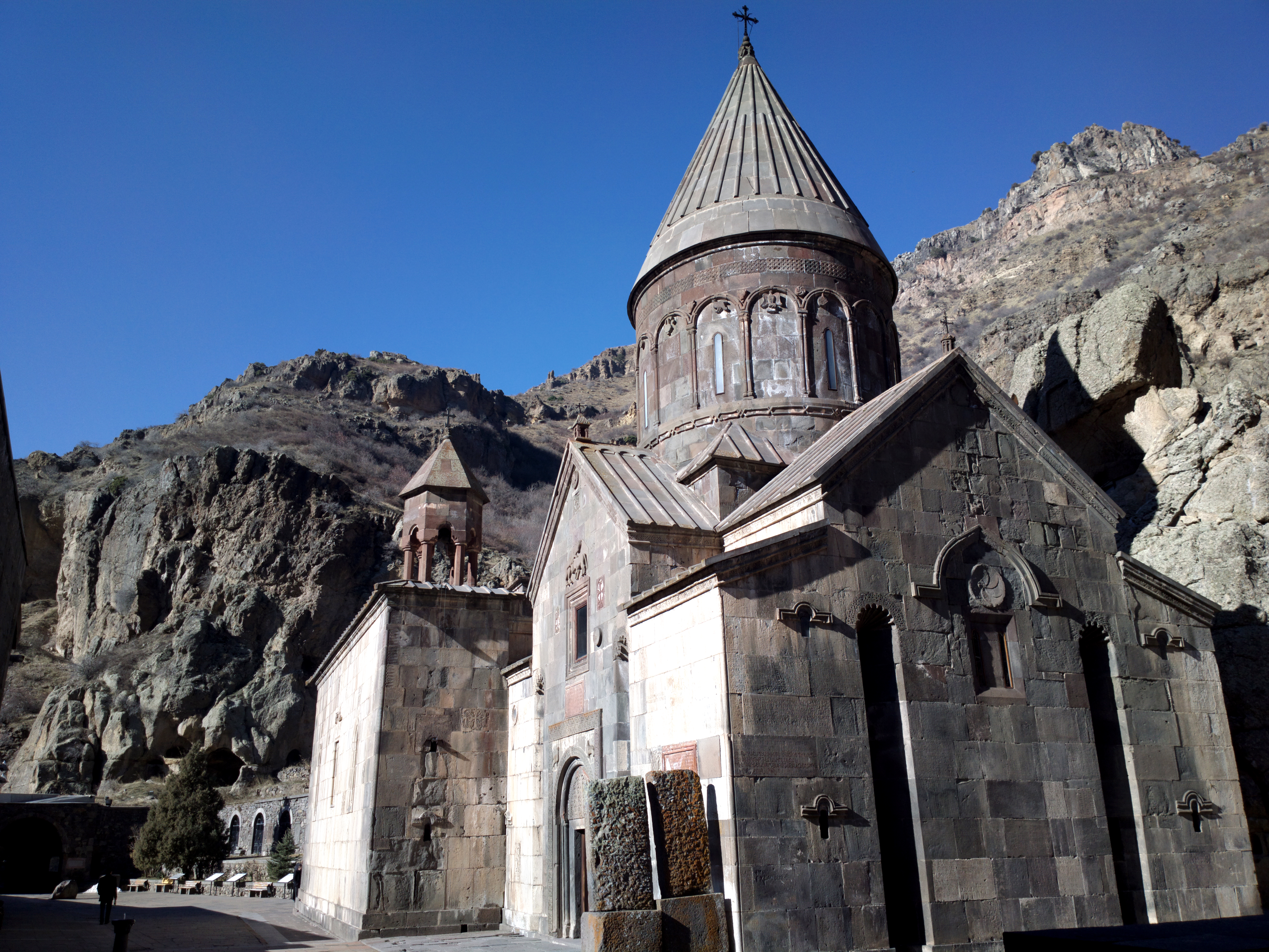
Geghard monastery

Armenian cross-stones art and Symbolism and craftsmanship of Khachkars, listed to UNESCO intangible world heritage site. The following is a list of World Heritage Sites designed or constructed by Iranians, or designed and constructed in the style of Armenian architecture:

- Inside Armenia
  - Haghpat Monastery and Sanahin Monastery
  - Etchmiadzin cathedral, Saint Hripsime Church, Saint Gayane Church, Shoghakat Church, Zvartnots Cathedral in Vagarshapat
  - Geghard monastery
- Outside Armenia
  - Church of the Holy All-Savior of Derbent in Russia
  - Ani in Turkey
  - Ani Cathedral in Turkey
  - The church of the Holy Redeemer in Turkey
  - The church of St Gregory of the Abughamrents in Turkey
  - St Gregory of Tigran Honents in Turkey
  - Monastery of the Hripsimian Virgins in Turkey
  - King Gagik's church of St Gregory in Turkey
  - St. Thaddeus Monastery in Iran
  - Saint Stepanos Monastery in Iran
  - Chapel of Dzordzor in Iran
  - Chapel of Chupan in Iran
  - Church of the Holy Mother of God, Darashamb in Iran

== See also ==
- Armenian art
- Armenian sculpture
- Armenian church architecture
- List of castles in Armenia
- List of monasteries in Armenia
- List of cathedrals in Armenia
- List of bridges in Armenia
- Armenian Khachkars
- Armenian Palaces
- Gavit
- Vishapakar
- Stone sculptures of horses and sheep in the Caucasian States
- Armenian Union of Architects
- Children of Armenia Fund
- Research on Armenian Architecture
- Tumo Center for Creative Technologies
- Architecture of Urartu

== Bibliography ==
- Armen, Garbis (1992), An Architecture of Survival, ISBN 0-9695988-0-7
