= Honour Guard Company (Armenia) =

- Պատվո պահքի գումարտակը
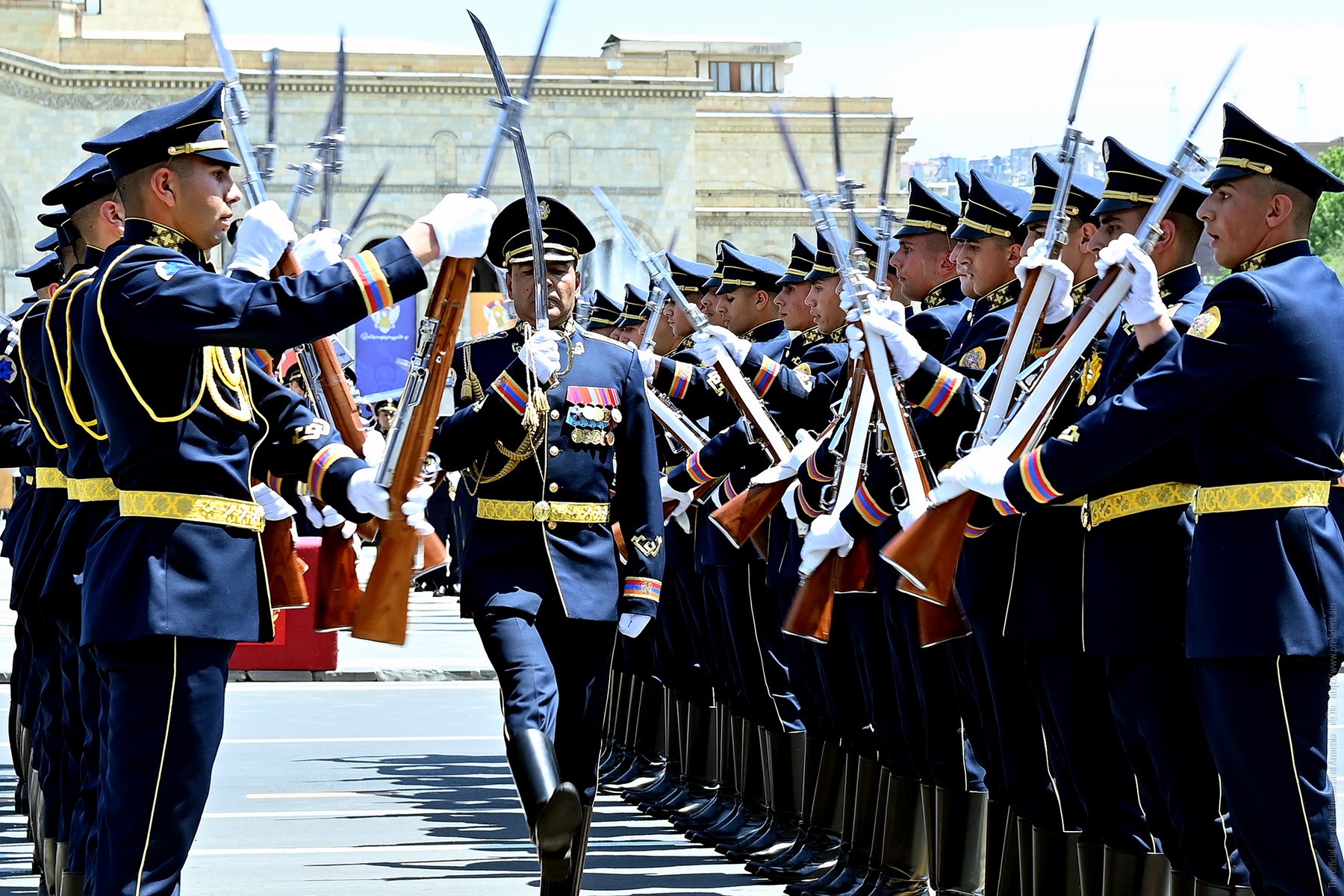
- Honour Guard drill team at the 2026 Republic Day military parade
- Active: 18 January 1993–present
- Country: Armenia
- Branch: Armed Forces of Armenia
- Type: Honor Guard
- Role: Ceremonial duties
- Size: 72
- Part of: Ministry of Defense of Armenia
- Garrison/HQ: Yerevan
- Anniversaries: January 18
- Equipment: SKS, AK-47

Commanders
- Company Commander: Colonel Sokrat Vardanyan

The Honour Guard Company of the Ministry of Defence of Armenia (Armenian: Հայաստանի Պաշտպանության նախարարության Պատվո պահքի գումարտակը, romanized: Hayastani Pashtpanut’yan nakhararut’yan Patvo pahk’i gumartaky) is a military unit of Armed Forces of Armenia that performs protocol tasks for high-ranking officials at the Presidential Palace and the Prime Minister's Residence. The unit is under direct command of the Ministry of Defence of Armenia. Most members of the unit are graduates of the Vazgen Sargsyan Military University.

== Overview ==
The company was established on 18 January 1993. The unit's first major event was the funeral of Monte Melkonian in June 1993. The first official welcoming ceremony that the honour guard took part in was for the visit of Russian Defense Minister Pavel Grachev in 1994. That same day, then unit commander Ashot Hakobyan was promoted to the rank of Captain. The company has taken part in the traditional Independence Day military parade on Republic Square since its inception 1996. In 2010 and 2015, the soldiers from company took part in the Moscow Victory Day Parade and was considered by Russian Defense Minister Sergei Shoigu as one of the best marching contingents in the latter. Members of the drill team have also participated in events involving the Russian 102nd Military Base based in Gyumri. Other foreign events have included the Bastille Day military parade in 2014 and the Festa della Repubblica parade in 2011 as well as a side performance at the International Defence Exhibition in Abu Dhabi in 2019. Since 2018, the unit has performed guard duty at the Prime Minister's Residence at Baghramyan Avenue. On the 75th anniversary of the end of the Second World War in 2020, servicemen of the unit took the combat flags of the 6 Armenian national divisions out of the Mother Armenia Military History Museum and handed them over to Armenian veterans of the war. On the occasion of the 2026 Republic Day military parade, new traditional-styled honor guard uniforms were introduced, replacing the old Soviet-styled dress.

== Requirements ==
In order to serve in the unit recruits must have a height of between 180 centimeters (5 ft 9 in) to 187 centimeters (6 ft 1 in). They are also required to maintain good health and have to have a college education (either from the Vazgen Sargsyan Military University or one of the country's universities).

== Organizational structure ==
The unit has the following sub-units:

- Welcoming Group – Consists of 27 soldiers which includes one commander, one color guard, and 24 personnel.
- Wreath Laying Group – Consists of 2–3 personnel. It is usually active at solemn ceremonies at Tsitsernakaberd and Mother Armenia.
- Drill Team Group

The unit performed exhibition drill for the first time in 2009 during the celebrations dedicated to the 15th anniversary of the Military Institute. It also performed during an event dedicated to Army Day in the main hall of the Yerevan Opera Theatre.

== Weapons ==
The unit currently utilizes the SKS rifle during drill, having adopted it in 2006. It previously used the AK-47 from 1991–2006. Drill with both of these weapons is completely different, with the biggest difference being seen in how both look when they are in the present arms position (the SKS is kept straight while in this position while the bottom of the AK-47 is kept facing to the left).

== Commanders ==
The unit has had the following commanders:

- Colonel Ashot Hakobyan (1993–2005)
- Lieutenant Colonel Vardan Khanferyan (2005–2009)
- Colonel Sokrat Vardanyan (2009–Present)

After leading the drill routine during the 2011 military parade, President Serzh Sargsyan awarded Vardanyan with the "For Services to the Motherland" second degree medal. Colonel Hakobyan, a former Kremlin Cadet himself, led the Separate Regiment of Protection of the Armenian Army during the 2015 Moscow Victory Day Parade on Red Square. Vardanyan accompanied Hakobyan in the contingent, leading the color guard of the flag of the 89th Rifle Division.

== Gallery ==
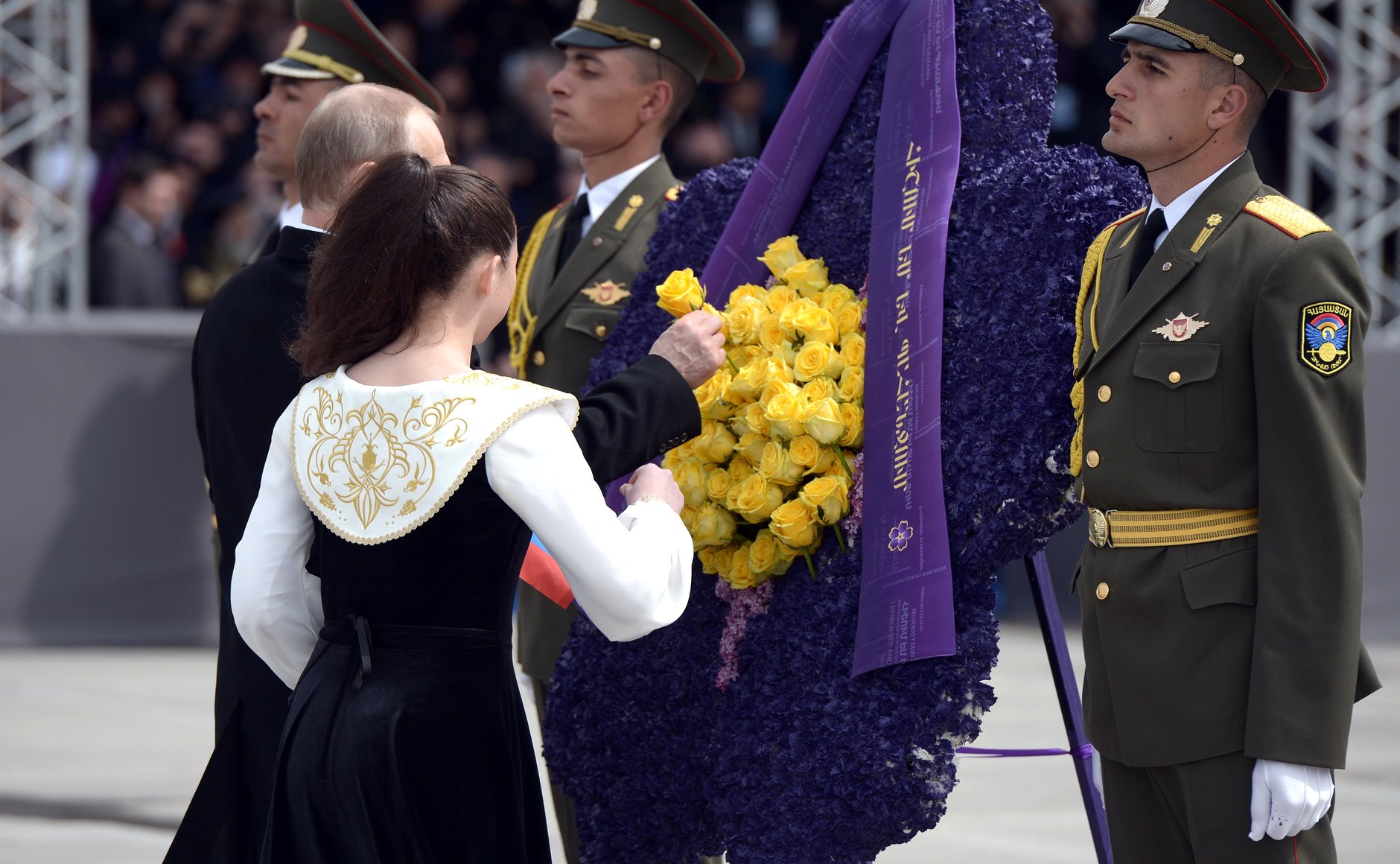
Members of the Wreath laying group.

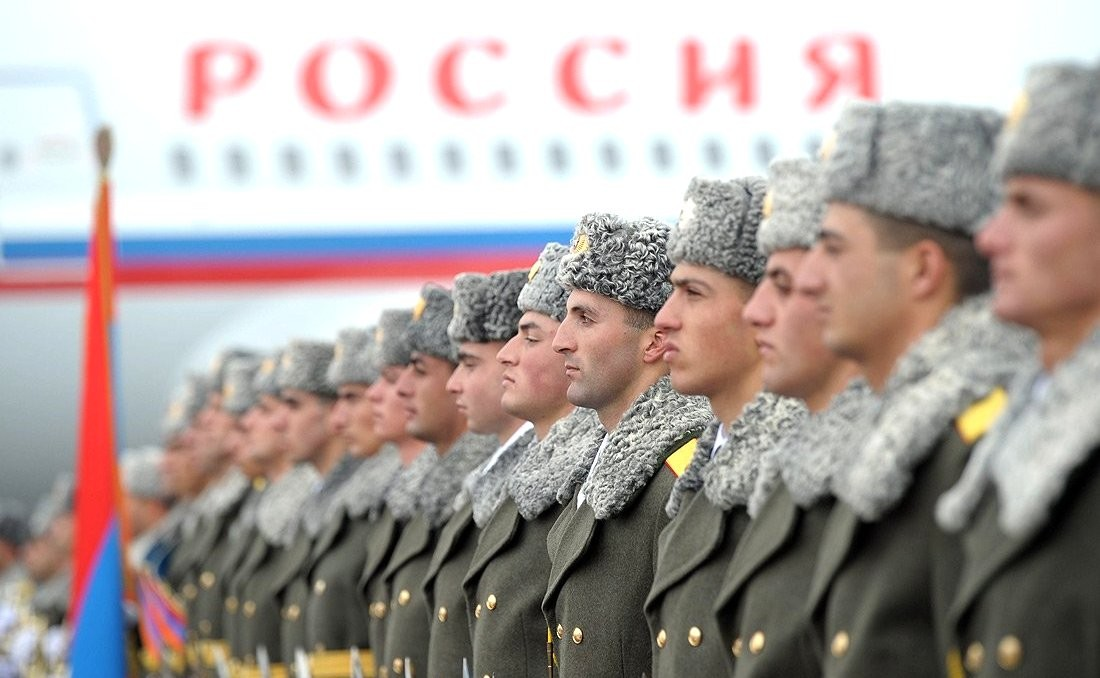
Members of the Honours group.

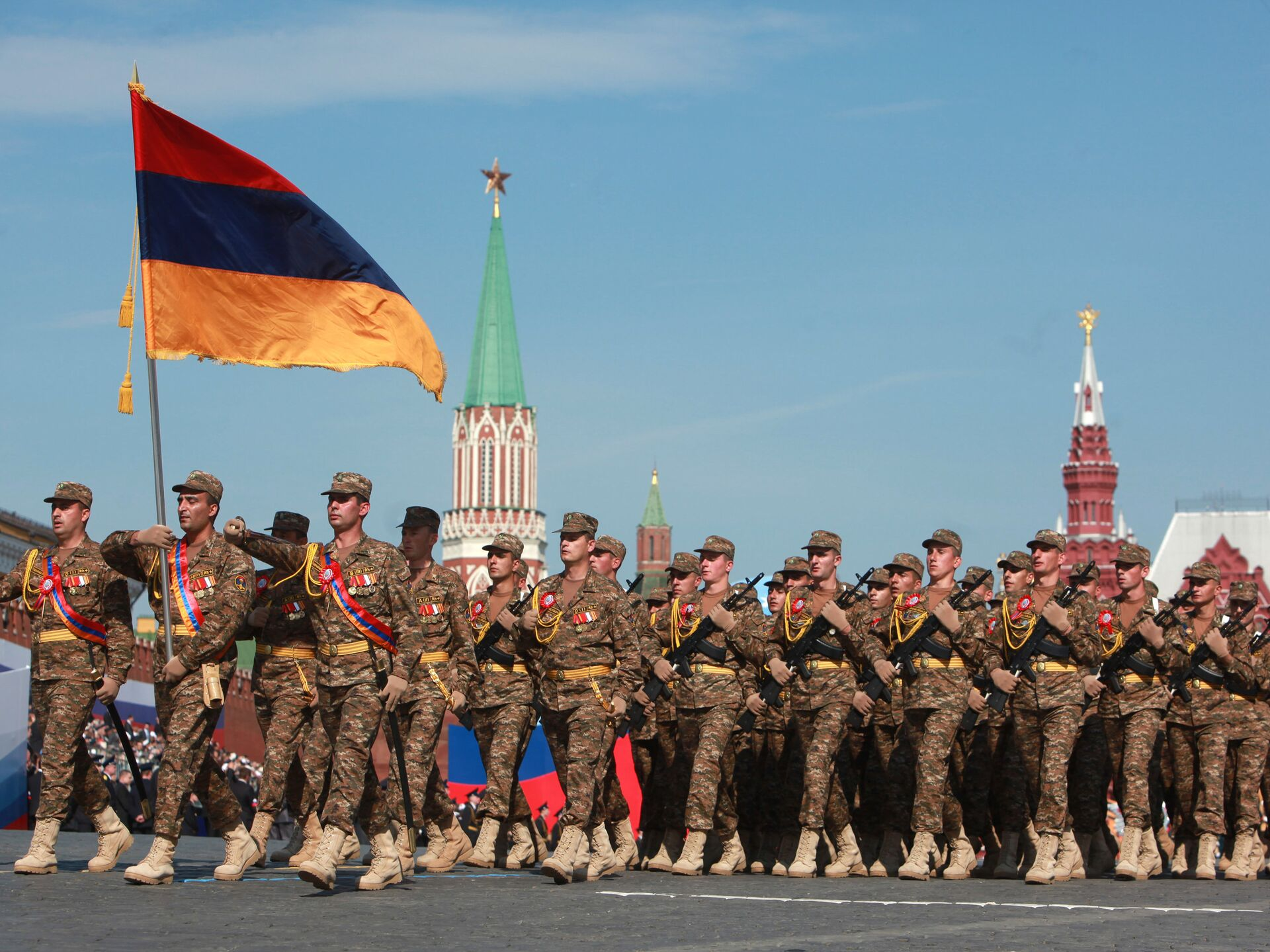
Members of the unit during the 2010 Moscow Victory Day Parade.

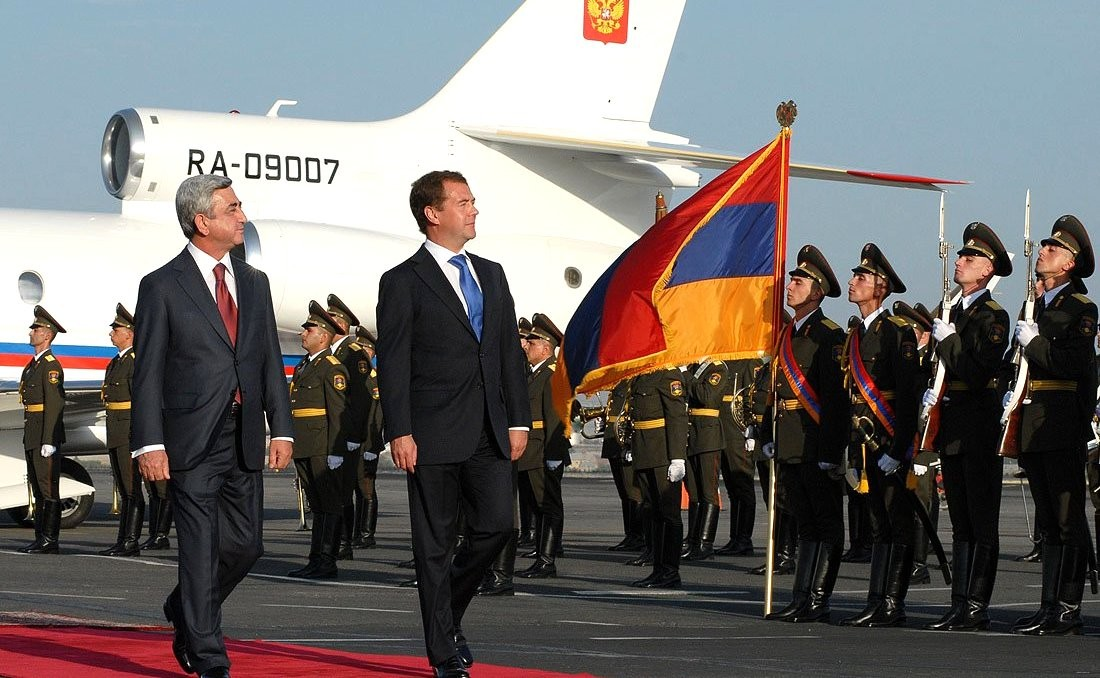
Russian President Dmitry Medvedev inspecting the company in August 2010.

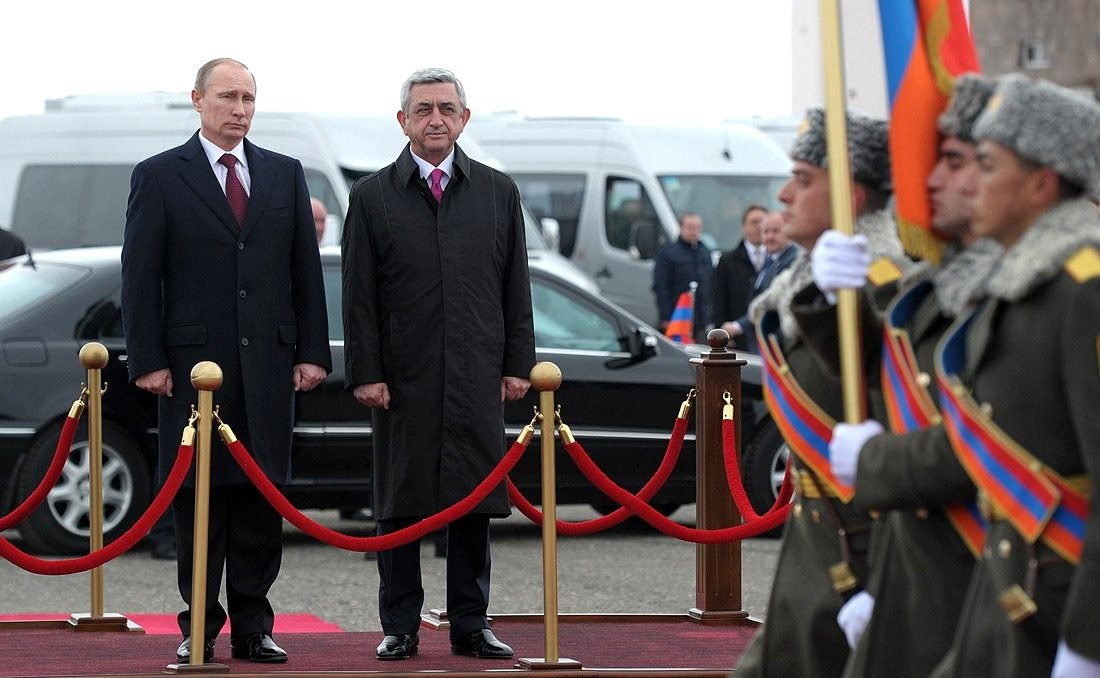
The company in front of Russian President Vladimir Putin and Armenian President Serzh Sargsyan.

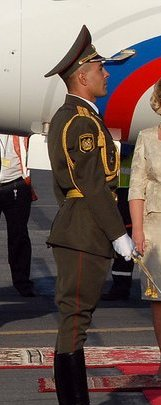
Lieutenant Colonel Sokrat Vardanyan

Russian Prime Minister Dmitry Medvedev inspecting the battalion during his visit to Yerevan in 2017

== See also ==
- Presidential Guard Regiment (Turkey)
- 154th Preobrazhensky Independent Commandant's Regiment
- Honor Guard of the Armed Forces of Belarus
- Band of the General Staff of the Armed Forces of Armenia
