= Mark Grigorian =

Soviet Armenian architect (1900–1978)

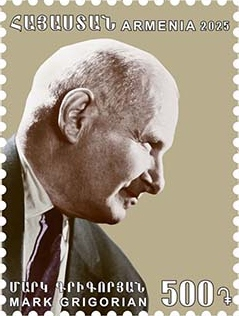
Grigorian on a 2025 stamp of Armenia

Mark Vladimirovich Grigorian (Armenian: Մարկ Գրիգորյան, Russian: Марк Владимирович Григорян; April 29, 1900 – January 10, 1978) was a Soviet Armenian Neoclassical architect.

== Life ==
Born Markos Varderesovich Ter-Grigoryan in Nakhichevan-on-Don, southern Russia, Grigorian moved to Soviet Armenia in 1924. He graduated from the Yerevan State University in 1928 and was appointed as the chief architect of Yerevan in 1939, succeeding Nikoghayos Buniatyan. He died in 1978.

== Works ==
Grigorian designed (or co-designed) several major landmarks of Yerevan, including the buildings where the three branches of the government are housed—all on Baghramyan Avenue, and three of the five buildings around Republic Square, along with Eduard Sarapian.

Below are listed his most notable works, all in Yerevan:

Building	History and use
National Assembly of Armenia	Its construction began in 1948 and was completed in 1950. It housed the Central Committee of the Communist Party of Armenian SSR until May 1991, when the Supreme Council (parliament) of the Republic of Armenia moved in. It now serves as the building of the National Assembly of Armenia, the country's legislature.
Presidential Palace	Completed in 1951, it initially served the Council of Ministers of the Armenian Soviet Republic and later as the building of the Presidium of the Supreme Council of Armenian SSR. It has been Armenia's Presidential Palace since independence in 1991, except for a brief period in 2018, when it was the residence of the Prime Minister.
Trade Unions and Communications Building	Its construction began in 1933 and was completed in 1956. It was designed by Grigorian and Eduard Sarapian. The building was home to Ministry of Transport and Communications until 2016.
Hotel Armenia	It was completed in 1958 according to the design of Grigorian and Eduard Sarapian. The hotel was called Armenia during the Soviet period. A luxury hotel, Armenia Marriott Hotel Yerevan it is considered the flagship hotel of Armenia. It has 380 rooms.
Matenadaran	Build between 1945 and 1958, except a pause from 1947 to 1953 due to unavailability of skilled laborers and carpenters, the building of the Matenadaran, the Institute of Ancient Manuscripts, was officially opened in 1959.
Constitutional Court of Armenia	The building of the Constitutional Court of Armenia was designed by Grigorian and Henrik Arakelian. It was completed in 1974.
Museums Building	The buildings of the History Museum of Armenia and the National Gallery of Armenia began in the 1950s with the National Gallery building being completed in 1977. It was designed by Grigorian and Eduard Sarapian.
Political Enlightenment House	Completed in 1979, the building served as the Political Enlightenment House of the Central Committee of the Armenian Communist Party until 1991, when it was given by the state to the American University of Armenia. It was designed by Grigorian and Henrik Arakelian.

== Awards ==
- Honored worker of arts of the Armenian SSR (18 November 1940)
- Order of Lenin (24 November 1945)
- Stalin Prize of 3rd degree (1951) – for the architecture of the building of the Central Committee of the Communist Party of the Armenian SSR in Yerevan
- Honored Architect of the Armenian SSR (18 October 1968)
- State Prize of the Armenian SSR (1971) – for the creation of the ensemble of V.I. Lenin Square in Yerevan
- Order of the Badge of Honour (11 August 1966)
