= National Assembly Building of Armenia =

Parliament building of Armenia

National Assembly Building
- Ազգային ժողովի շենք
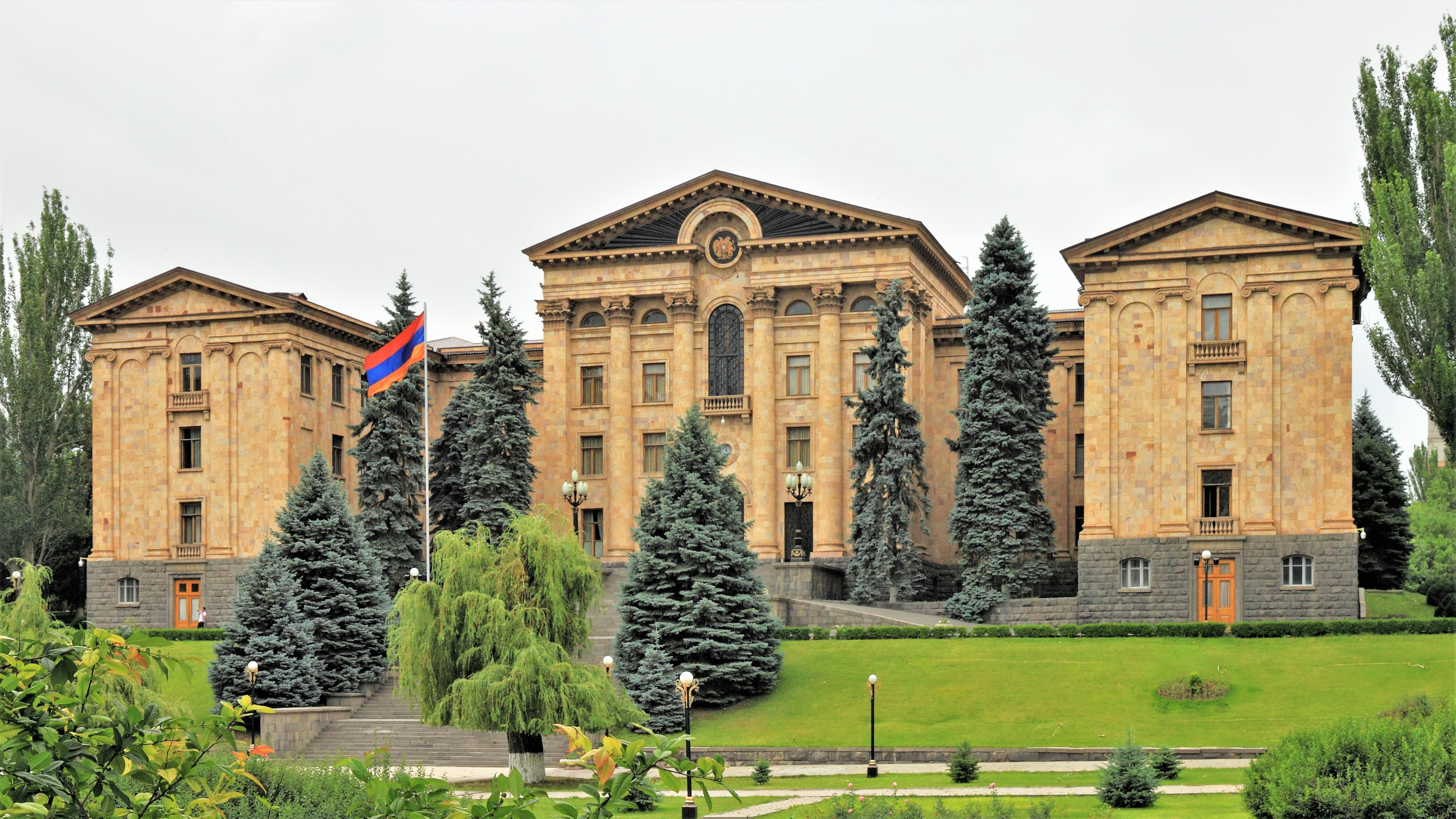
- Interactive map of the National Assembly Building area

General information
- Location: 19 Baghramyan Avenue, Yerevan, Armenia
- Coordinates: 40.1903°N 44.5092°E
- Construction started: 1948
- Completed: 1950; 76 years ago
- Owner: National Assembly of Armenia

Design and construction
- Architect: Mark Grigorian

Website
- http://parliament.am/

The National Assembly Building of Armenia (Armenian: Հայաստանի Ազգային ժողովի շենքը; Hayastani Azgayin Zhoghovi Shenk) is the home of the National Assembly of Armenia. The building is located on Baghramyan Avenue in Yerevan, Armenia's capital city. It was designed by Mark Grigorian. It was completed in 1950 and initially housed the legislature of Soviet Armenia, the Supreme Soviet. Since the adoption of the Armenian Constitution in 1995, the building has been occupied by the National Assembly.
