= Armenia Marriott Hotel Yerevan =

Hotel in Yerevan, Armenia

- Արմենիա Մարիոթ Հյուրանոց Երևան
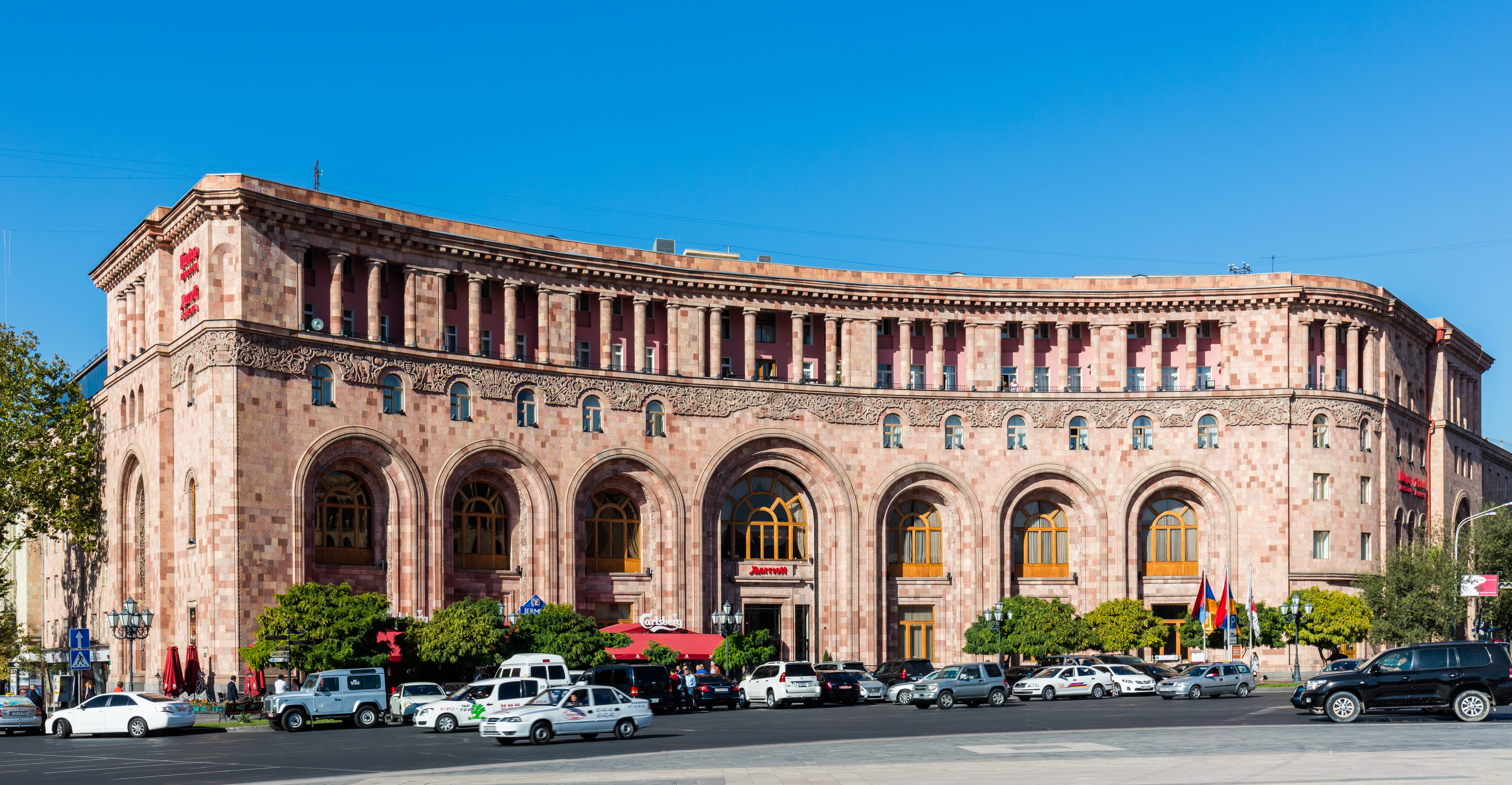

- Location within Armenia
- Former names: Armenia Hotel
- Hotel chain: Marriott Hotels & Resorts

General information
- Location: Yerevan, Armenia
- Coordinates: 40°10′40″N 44°30′41″E
- Construction started: 1950
- Completed: 1958
- Opening: 1958 (as Armenia Hotel); 1999 (as Armenia Marriott Hotel Yerevan)
- Owner: AK Development
- Operator: Marriott Hotels & Resorts

Technical details
- Floor count: 7

Design and construction
- Architects: Mark Grigorian; Eduard Sarapyan

Other information
- Number of rooms: 144
- Number of suites: 23
- Number of restaurants: 4

Website
- Official website

Armenia Marriott Hotel Yerevan (Armenian: Արմենիա Մարիոթ Հյուրանոց Երևան) is a hotel at the central Kentron District of Yerevan, Armenia. It was opened in 1958 as Armenia Hotel (Armenian: Արմենիա Հյուրանոց, Russian: Гостиница Армения), a state-owned enterprise during the Soviet period. After the collapse of the Soviet Union, the hotel was privatized in 1998 and following a major renovation; it was reopened as the Armenia Marriott Hotel Yerevan in 1999.

The hotel is located on 1 Amiryan Street, overlooking the Republic Square. The National Gallery and the government building are located in front of the hotel.

As of 2016, with 259 guestrooms, Armenia Marriott is the 2nd-largest hotel in Armenia. As of 2020, the hotel has 144 rooms in the inventory with the Ararat wing being temporarily closed.

== History ==
The construction of the hotel was launched in 1950 and completed in 1958. The hotel was opened in 1958 and named Armenia. It was operated by the state-governed Intourist agency; the regulating body of the hotels and tourism within the Soviet Union. At the time of its opening, Armenia was the largest hotel of the Armenian SSR. The hotel was designed by lead architects Mark Grigorian and Eduard Sarapyan and structural Engineer Lernik Barsegyan based on the original plan of Yerevan composed by Alexander Tamanian. The project was directed by Kostantin Altunyan. The foundation of the hotel are from basalt stone, while the hotel itself is built of pink Armenian tufa.

Following the economical crisis of Armenia during the 1990s, the hotel was acquired by the "AK Development" company in 1998 from "RDP" Rits Development Paris for US$53 million. After large-scale renovation works and an investment of US$40 million, the hotel was entirely redeveloped to meet the highest international standards. It was reopened in 1999 as the Armenia Marriott Hotel Yerevan, operated by the Marriott Hotels & Resorts category of Marriott International. Currently, the hotel consists of three separate buildings (Ararat, Armenia and the New building), located adjacent to each other.

== Features ==
The hotel has many restaurants, including the "Crystal" bar and lounge, the "Armenia Brasserie" restaurant, the "Meeting Point Gastro Cafe and Terrace" outdoor café (seasonal for summer), and the only in-town Executive Lounge, serving breakfast and dinner for those staying in the Executive and above category of rooms. The hotel is also home to 10 conference halls, a fitness and health center, as well as an outdoor swimming pool.

The hotel can be reached via the nearby Republic Square underground station.
