= President's Residence, Yerevan =

Official residence of the President of Armenia

President's Residence
- Նախագահի նստավայր
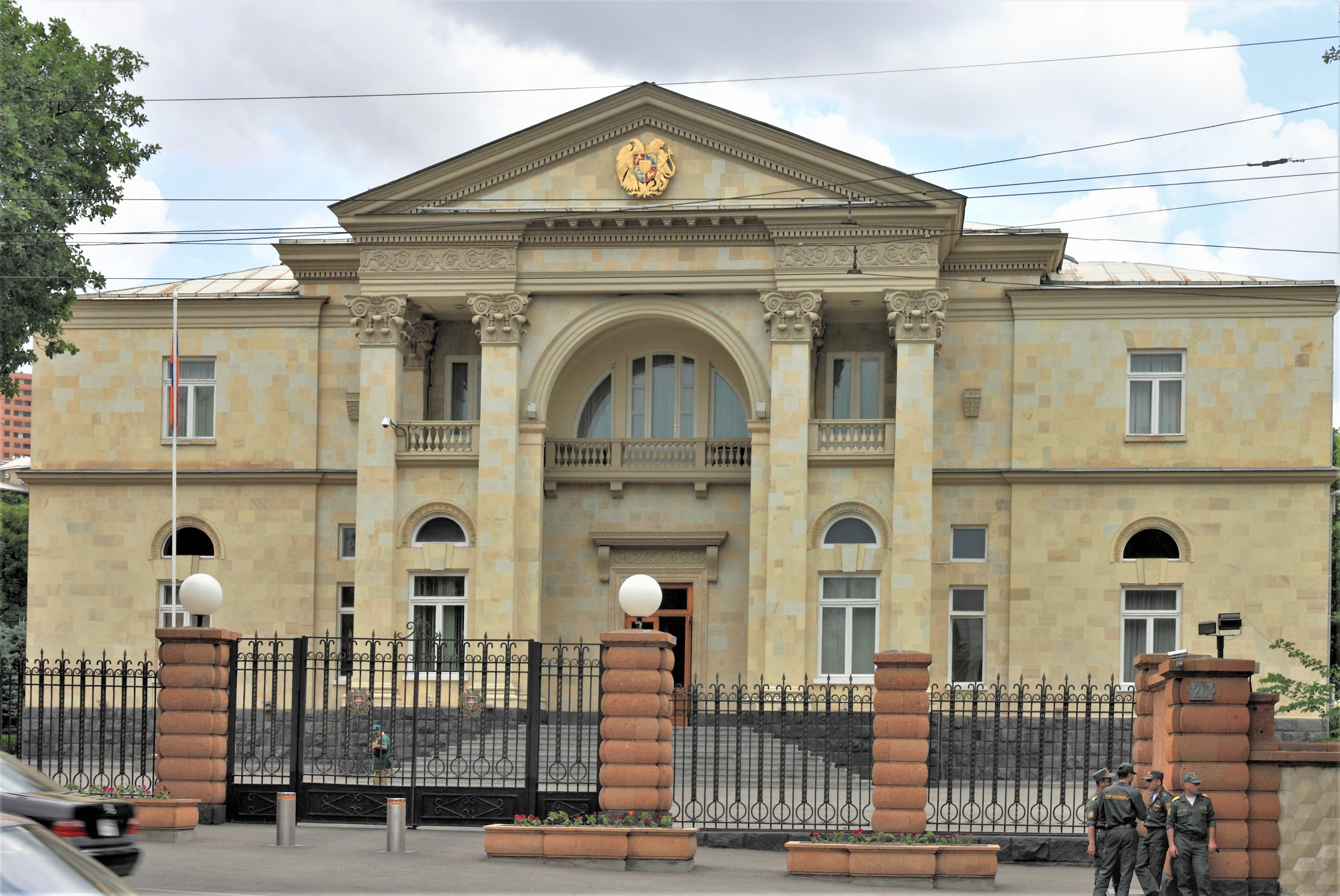

General information
- Address: Baghramyan Avenue 26/1, Yerevan, Armenia
- Coordinates: 40°11′34″N 44°30′22″E
- Opened: 1951
- Client: President of Armenia

Design and construction
- Architect(s): Mark Grigoryan

Website
- president.am

The Residence of the President of Armenia (Armenian: Հայաստանի Հանրապետության նախագահի նստավայր; Hayastani Hanrapetut'yun Nakhagahi Nstavayr) is located at 26/1 Baghramyan Avenue in Yerevan.

== History ==
The building was designed by Mark Grigorian as the premises for the Council of Ministers of the Armenian Soviet Socialist Republic and completed in 1951. It served as the residence of the president of Armenia from 11 November 1991 until 9 April 2018, when Armenia was officially turned into parliamentary republic, and the building became the official residence of the prime minister. The president's residence was moved to Mashtots Avenue. On 8 November 2018, the Armenian government approved an initiative to relocate the prime minister's residence to Government House 1 and reallocate the building on Baghramyan Avenue 26 again as the president's residence.

== Public access ==
Since 2018, the Honour Guard of the Ministry of Defense of Armenia has performed guard duty at the residence. The gates to the residence are usually open to visitors on weekends and for a couple hours on weekdays.

== Interior ==
Sections of the palace on Baghramyan Avenue 26/1 as they were used before reallocation of the building to the president:

- The Entrance Hall, which links the old and new parts of the building, contains cabinets where souvenirs given to the leader of Armenia upon visiting foreign dignitaries are on display.
- The Green Chamber is a meeting room where the President of Armenia meets top officials of his country, foreign ministers, Speakers of Parliament and foreign ambassadors.
- The Circular Chamber is the place where ambassadors to Armenia are accredited by the President.
- The Gilded Chamber is where the President of Armenia holds meetings with foreign heads of state.
- The Grand Hall is used by the President of Armenia to host official receptions, official dinners, award ceremonies and press conferences.
- The Small Hall is used for meetings with high level foreign dignitaries.
- The Blue Room is used for meetings chaired by the President. Joint press conferences when the President of Armenia has a foreign guest are also held here.
- The Meeting Room is used by the President for negotiations conducted in the framework of visits by foreign dignitaries.
- The Fireplace Chamber and the White Room are used for meetings.
- The Conference Hall of the new building.
- The Meeting Room of the new building.
- The Small Conference Room of the new building.
- The President's Office.

Adjacent to the original building is a newer part of the Palace. It contains a Conference Room, a Meeting Room and the President's office.
