= Shcherbatov apartment house =

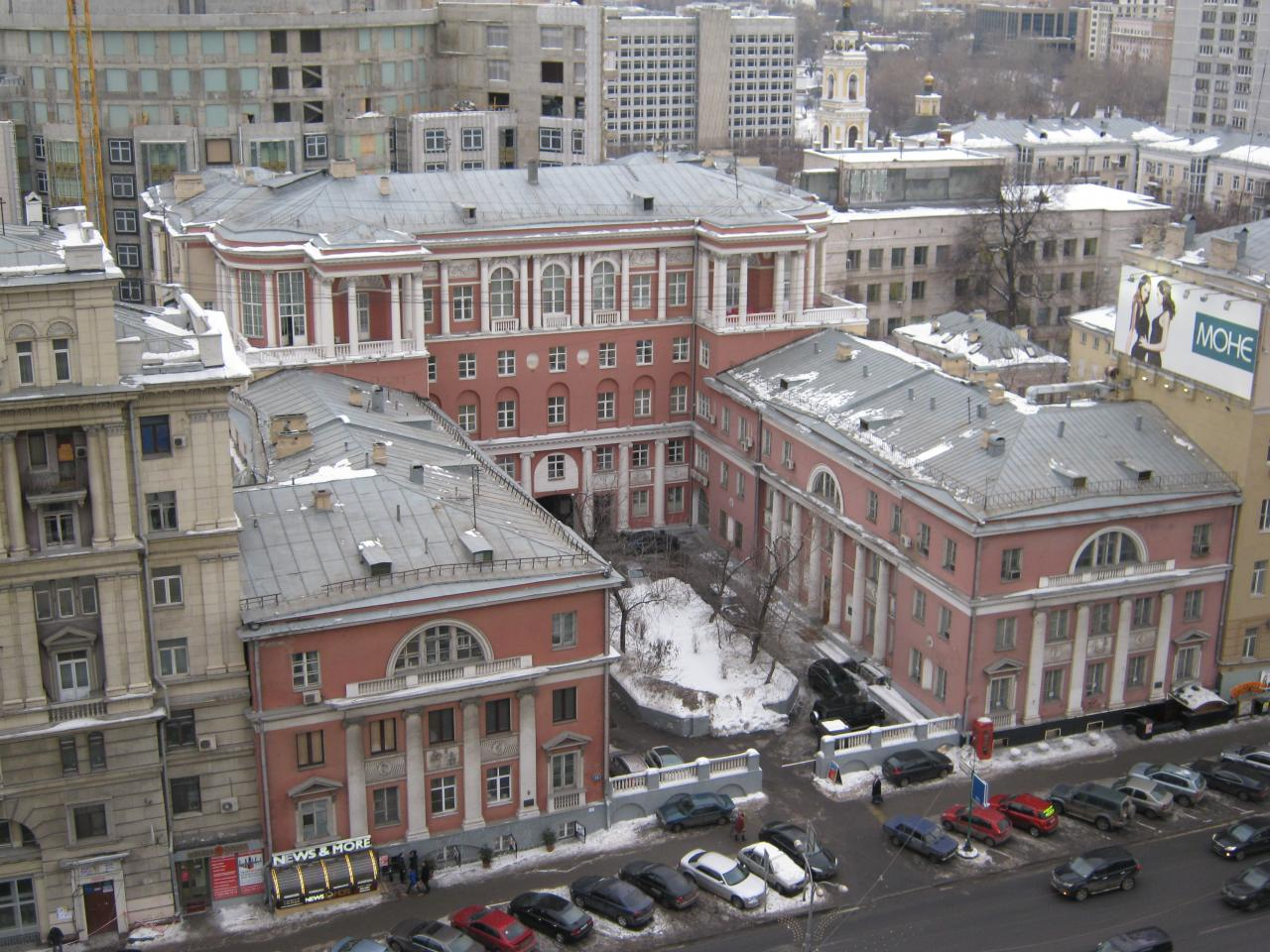
- Interactive map of Shcherbatov apartment house
- Location: Moscow, Russia
- Coordinates: 55.753457°N 37.582209°E

The Shcherbatov apartment house is a building in the center of Moscow on the Garden Ring (Novinsky Boulevard, 11). The apartment house was built in 1911–1913 by order of knyaz S. A. Shcherbatov by architect A. I. Tamanyan. The building belongs to the neoclassical style and has the status of an object of cultural heritage of Federal importance.

== History ==
The apartment house of S. A. Shcherbatov was built in 1911–1913 by architect A. I. Tamanyan with the participation of sculptors A. A. Kudinov, V. V. Kuznetsov. Interior paintings made by artist I. I. Nivinsky. The construction was led by architect A. N. Ageenko. The project of the building was awarded the I prize and the gold medal of the competition of the best buildings, held by The city Council in 1914. According to Shcherbatov's plan, the building was to house a Museum of private collections intended for the exhibition of private collections. The apartments Shcherbatov often gathered famous Moscow writers and artists, including A. N. Tolstoy and V. A. Serov.

After the October revolution, the apartments in the former apartment house of Shcherbatov were transferred to the workers of the "trekhgornaya manufactory". On November 8, 1921, an outpatient clinic was opened in the building (now 2nd Central clinic of the Ministry of defence). In 1991, the clinic moved from the building on the street of Academician Skryabin, 3. Now in the house are some residential apartments and offices.

== Architecture ==
The building has a H-shape and consists of three volumes. In its composition, it looks like a typical Moscow city estate. The central part has five floors and is located in the depth of the front yard. Three-storey side wings extend to the street. In the apartment house there were 28 eight-room apartments intended for rent. On the last two floors of the Central building housed apartments S. A. Shcherbatov.

The side wings are decorated with four large order pilasters with entablature, above which is a semicircular window. The Central building stands out for its rich decoration, especially the last two floors with Shuvalov apartments. They are marked with Corinthian colonnade with projecting porticoes on both sides, decorated with bas-reliefs and sculpture. The corners of the Central building are rounded, which gives it a special expressiveness.

In the front yard, originally separated from the street bars, were planted luxury flower beds. Housed in the back yard with a stables and a garage.
