= Alexander Tamanian =

Armenian architect (1878–1936)

- Ալեքսանդր Թամանյան
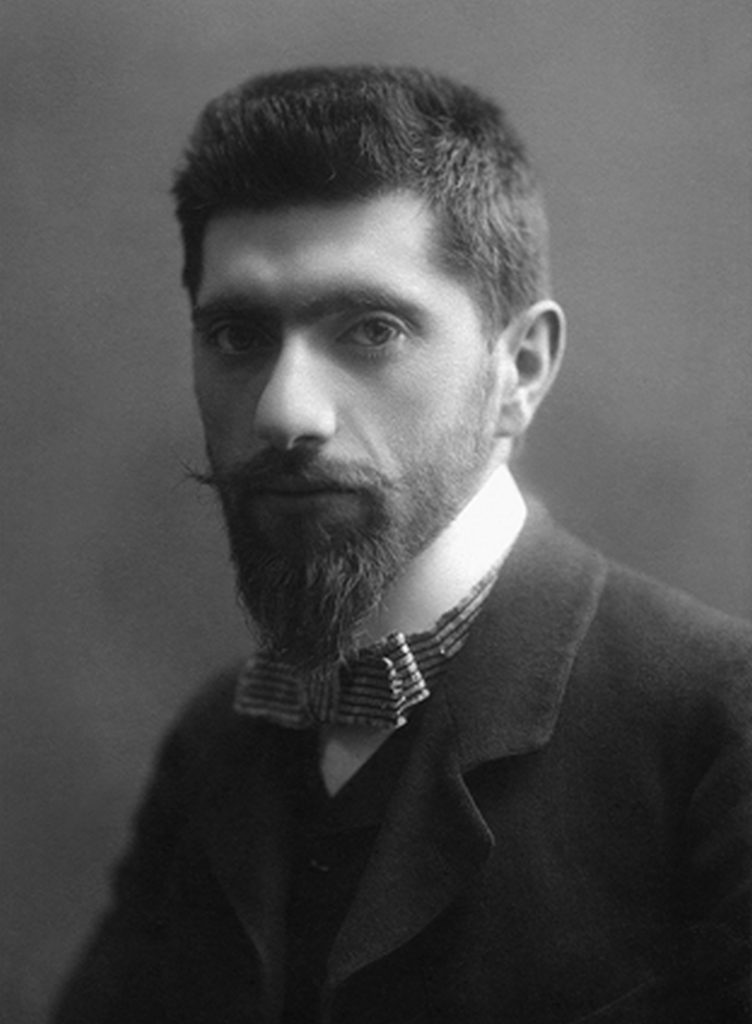
- Alexander Tamanian, 1903
- Born: March 4, 1878; Yekaterinodar, Kuban Oblast, Russian Empire (now Krasnodar, Russia)
- Died: February 20, 1936 (aged 57); Yerevan, Armenian SSR, Soviet Union
- Resting place: Komitas Pantheon, Yerevan
- Occupation: Architect
- Buildings: Armenian Opera Theater
- Projects: Main Layout of Yerevan

Alexander Hovhannesi Tamanian (Armenian: Ալեքսանդր Հովհաննեսի Թամանյան; Russian: Алекса́ндр Ива́нович Тама́нов, romanized: Aleksándr Ivánovich Tamánov; March 4, 1878 – February 20, 1936) was a Russian-born Armenian neoclassical architect, well known for his work in the city of Yerevan.

== Life and work ==
Tamanian was born in the city of Yekaterinodar in 1878 in the family of a banker. He graduated from the St Petersburg Academy of Arts in 1904. His works portrayed sensitive and artistic neoclassical trends popular in those years. Some of his early works included the mansion of V. P. Kochubei in Tsarskoye Selo, 1911–1912; the house of Prince S. A. Scherbatov in Novinski Boulevard in Moscow, 1911–1913; the village railway employees housing and the tuberculosis sanatorium at the Prozorovskaya station (now Kratovo) near Moscow, 1913–1923; central workshops of Kazan railway in Lyubertsy, 1916).

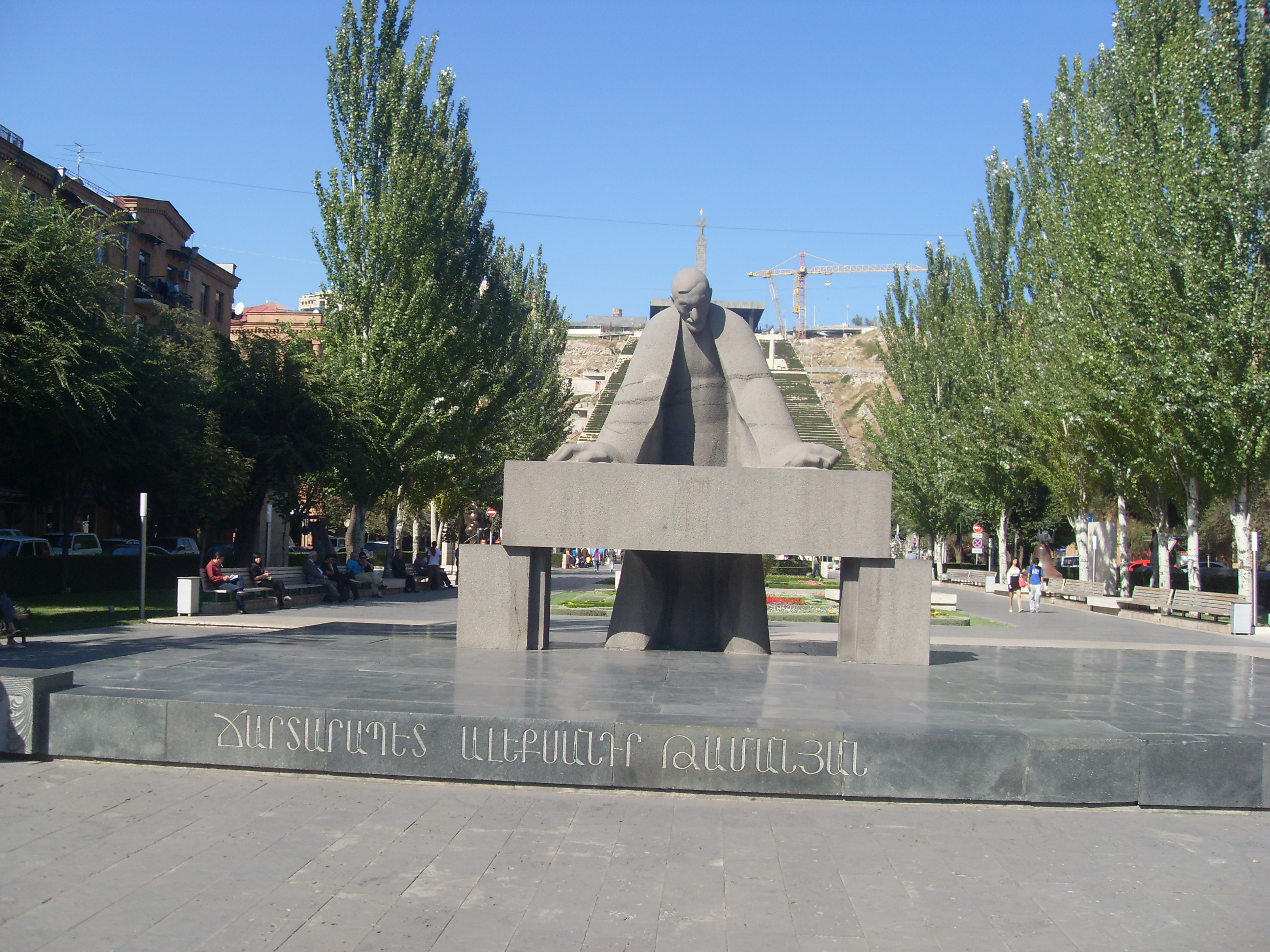
Statue of Alexander Tamanian at the steps of the Yerevan Cascade

He became an Academician of Architecture in 1914, in 1917 he was elected as the Vice-President of the Academy of Arts. In 1923 he moved to Yerevan, heading the new construction effort in the republic. He was the chief engineer of the local Council of People's Commissars and was a member of the CEC of the Armenian SSR (1925–1936), sponsored the construction industry, designed the layouts of towns and villages including Leninakan (now Gyumri) (1925), Stepanakert (1926), Nor-Bayazet (now Gavar) and Ahta-ahpara (both in 1927), Echmiadzin (1927–1928), and others. Tamanian created the first general plan of the modern city of Yerevan which was approved in 1924. Tamanian's style was instrumental in transforming what was essentially a small provincial city into the modern Armenian capital, a major industrial and cultural center. Neoclassicism dominated his designs but Tamanian also implemented a national flavor (red linings of tuff, traditional decorative carvings on stone etc.). Among his most famous designs in Yerevan are the hydroelectric station (ERGES-1, 1926), the Opera and Ballet house named after A. Spendiarian (1926–1953), the Republic Square (1926–1941) and others. He also played a major role in the development of restoration projects of historical landmarks in the country, chairing the Committee for the Protection of Historic Monuments in Armenia.

Tamanian was married to Camilla Edwards, a maternal granddaughter to architect Nicholas Benois. Their sons Gevorg (Georgi) and Yulius Tamanian also became noted architects and continued their father's work.

Tamanian died in Yerevan on February 20, 1936, and is buried at the Komitas Pantheon which is located in the city center of Yerevan.

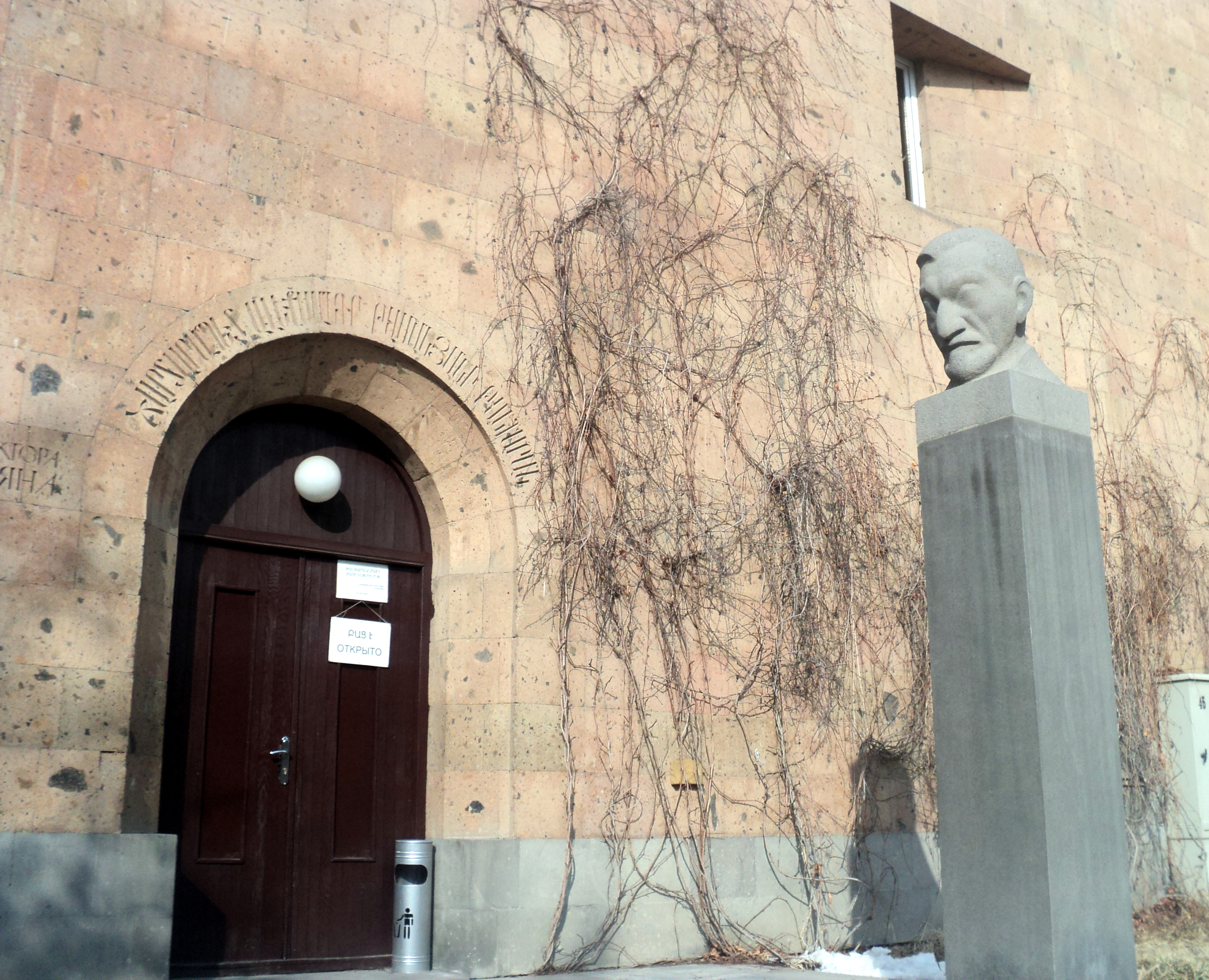
Institute Museum after Alexander Tamanian, Yerevan

== Buildings ==
- Aghasi Khanjian’s mansion, Hrazdan River gorge – 1920s
- Andrei Sakharov Square – 1924 – Nalbandyan St., Pushkin St., Vardanants St.
- Freedom Square – Mashtots Av., Teryan St., Sayat-Nova St. – 1924-1939
- Republic Square – 1926-1977
- University Observatory - Student Park (between Abovyan and Teryan streets) – 1926
- First Hydroelectric Power Plant – Left bank of Hrazdan River – 1926
- State Medical University – Koryun St. – 1927-1955
- Institute of Zoology and Veterinary – Nalbandyan St. – 1928
- Hospital of Obstetrics and Gynecology – Abovyan St. – 1929
- Institute of Physiotherapy – Abovyan St. – 1930, 1932, 1939
- Engineering University - Teryan St. – 1932, 1935
- University of Architecture and Construction – Teryan St. – 1935
- Children's Hospital – Abovyan St. – 1939
- National Academic Opera and Ballet Theatre – Freedom Square – 1933, 1940, 1953
- Government House – Republic Square – 1941, 1952
- Shcherbatov apartment house – Novinsky Boulevard – 1911–1913

== Projects ==
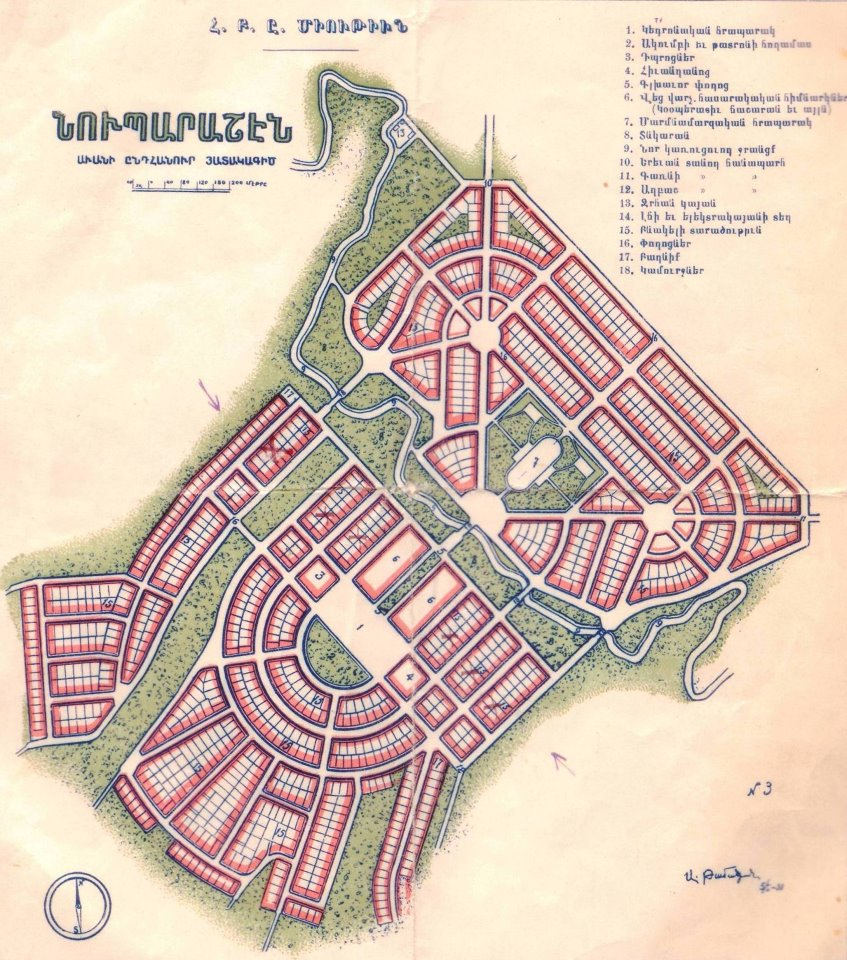
Plan of Nubarashen settlement in Armenia by the architect Alexander Tamanian, 1926

Tamanian also designed the layout of many towns and cities in Armenia, such as:

- Yerevan
  - Nor Arabkir town
  - Nubarashen, 1926
- Ejmiatsin
- Stepanakert, 1926
