= Baghramyan Avenue =

Avenue in Yerevan, Armenia

Marshal Baghramyan Avenue
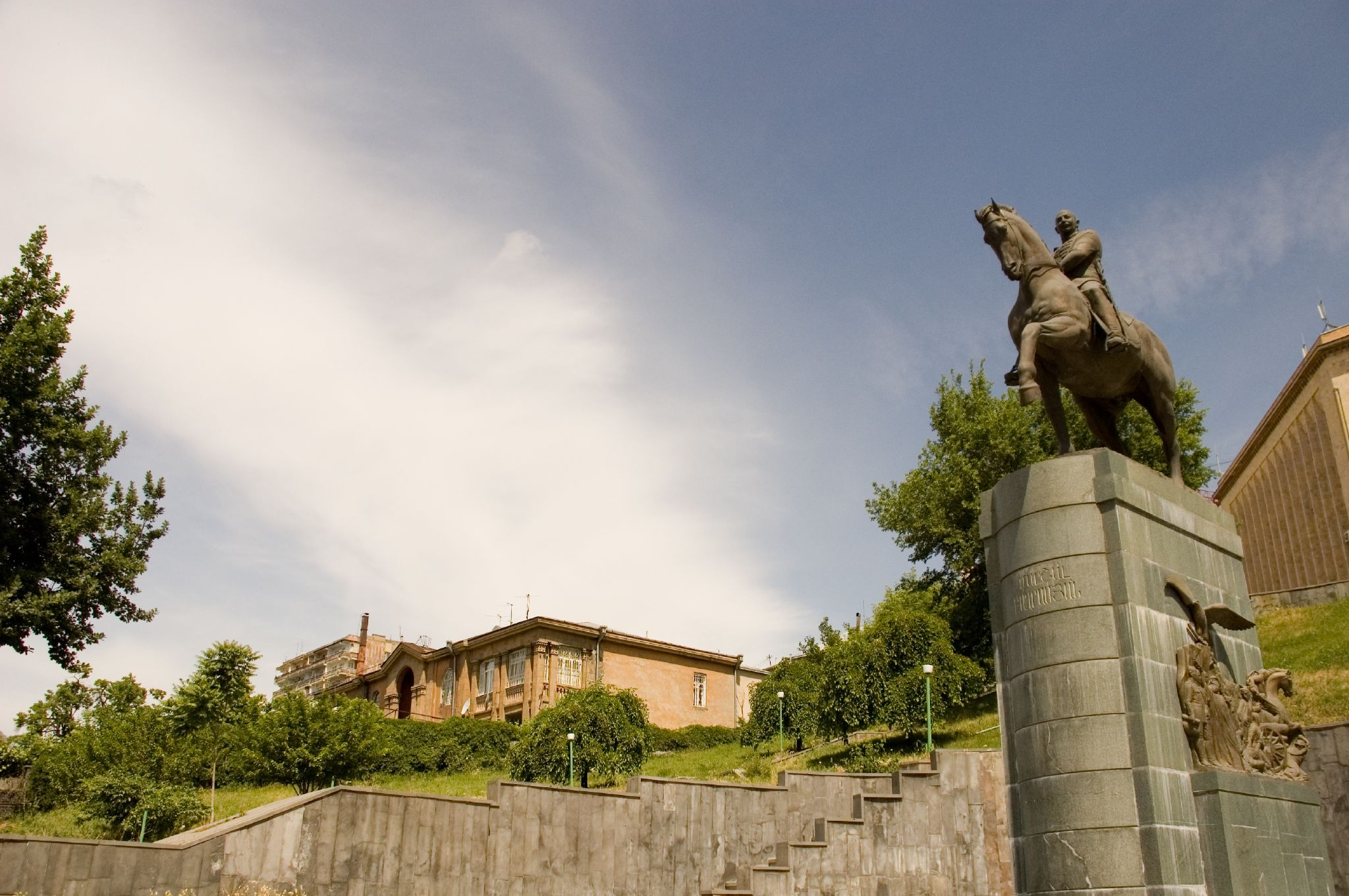
- The statue of Marshal Baghramyan on the avenue
- Interactive map of Marshal Baghramyan Avenue
- Native name: Մարշալ Բաղրամյան Պողոտա (Armenian)
- Former name: Friendship Avenue
- Length: 2.2 km (1.4 mi)
- Width: 17 metres
- Location: Kentron and Arabkir districts, Yerevan, Armenia
- Coordinates: 40°10′57″N 44°30′35″E

Marshal Baghramyan Avenue (Armenian: Մարշալ Բաղրամյան Պողոտա) is an avenue in the central Kentron and the northwestern Arabkir districts of Yerevan, Armenia. The avenue is named after the Soviet Armenian commander and Marshal of the Soviet Union Hovhannes Baghramyan whose statue stands at the central part of the avenue. It was known as the Friendship Avenue (Comradeship Avenue) between 1970 and 1995, as a tribute to the friendship of all Soviet Union member nations.

The 2.2-kilometre-long (1.4 mi) avenue starts with the Place de France at the east and ends up with the Barekamutyun Square at the west. It is mainly home to educational, government and foreign diplomatic mission buildings.

== Notable buildings ==
Marshal Baghramyan Avenue is home to a series of notable buildings and structures.

=== Government buildings ===
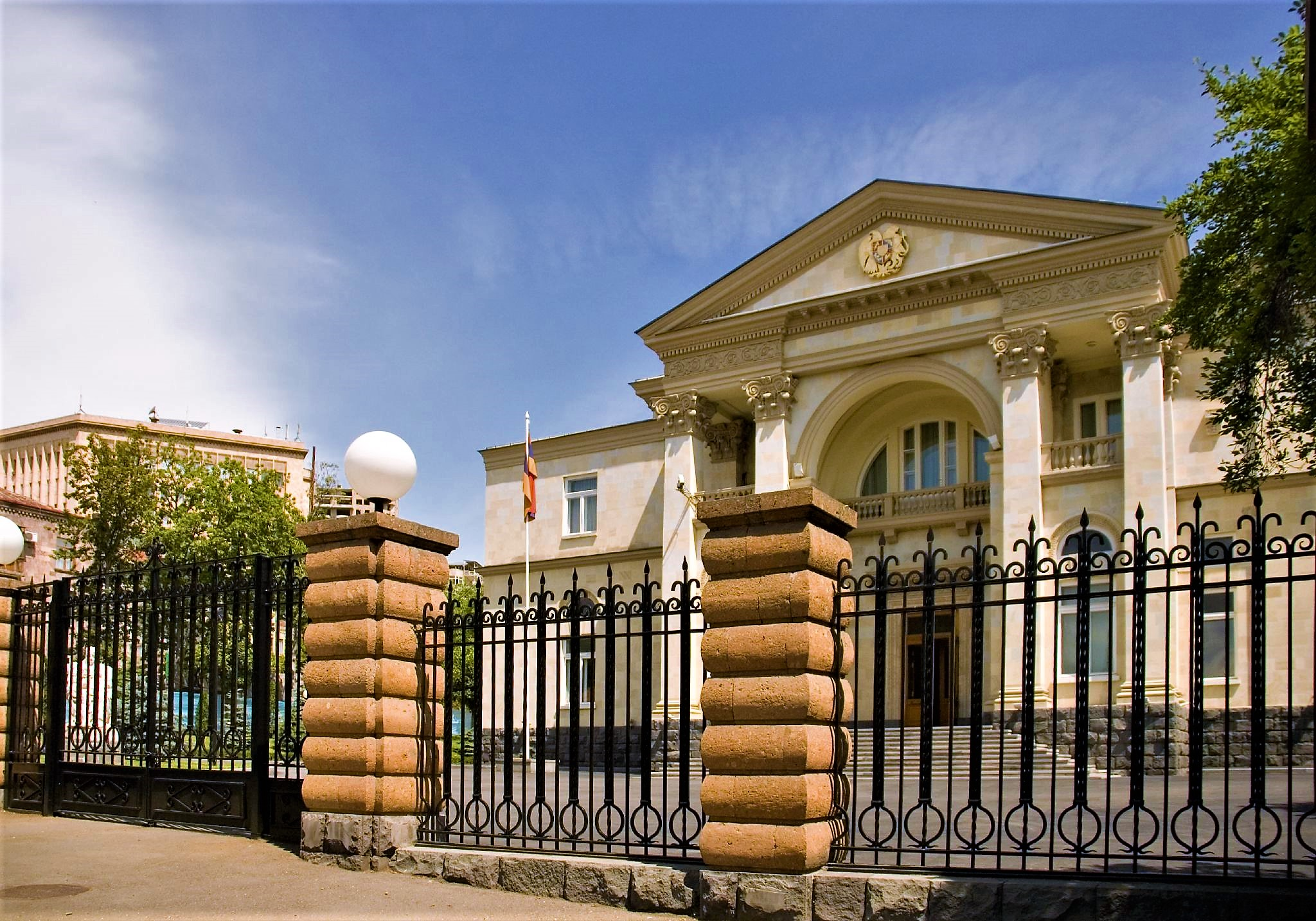
The Presidential Palace at 26 Baghramyan Avenue

- The Prime Minister's Residence (commonly known as Baghramyan 26)
- The National Assembly of Armenia
- Security Council of Armenia
- The Constitutional Court of Armenia

=== Foreign diplomatic missions ===
- Embassy of the United Kingdom
- Embassy of the Kingdom of Sweden
- Embassy of the Syrian Arab Republic
- Embassy of the People's Republic of China
- The consulate of Thailand

=== Education, science and culture ===
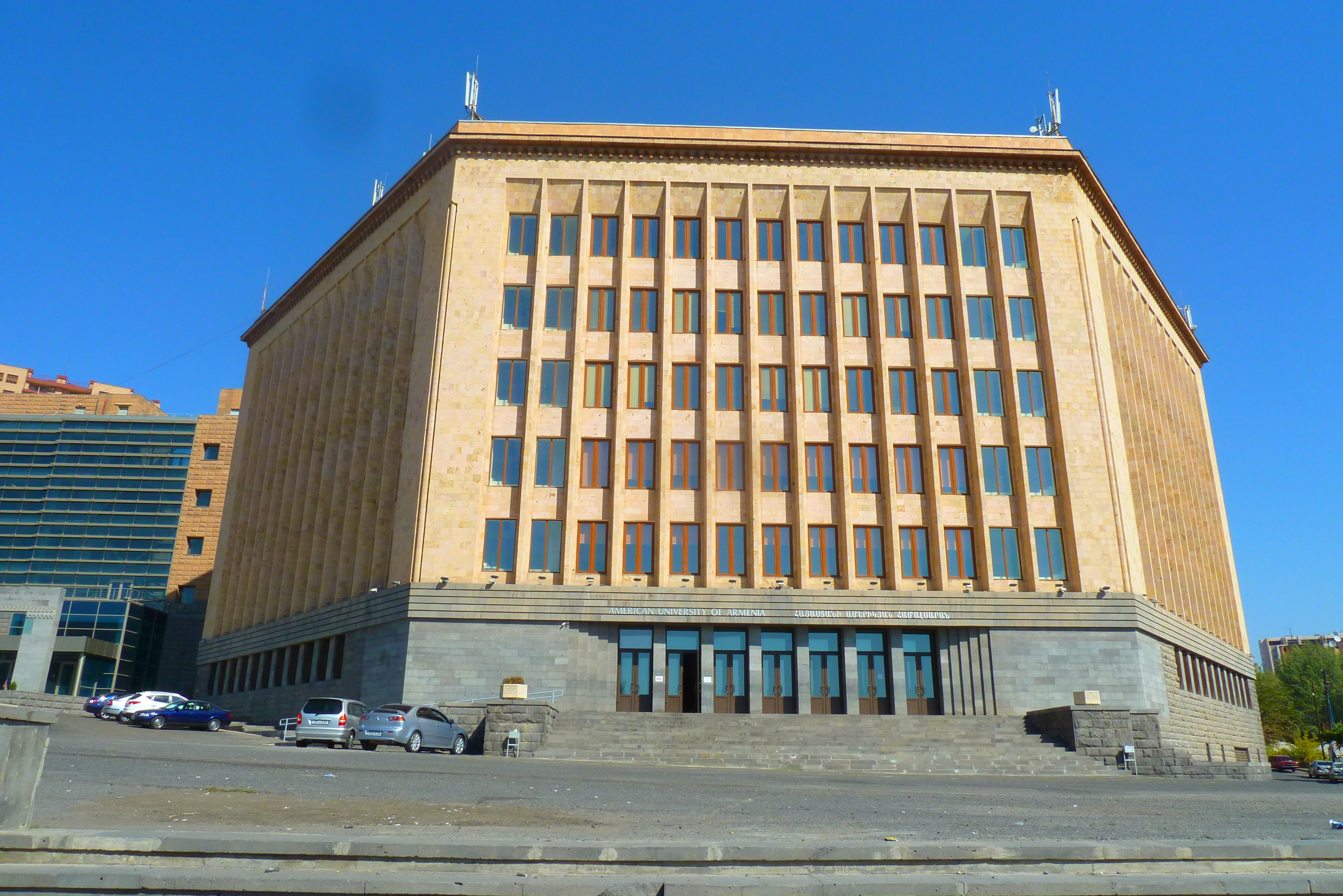
The American University of Armenia

- Armenian National Academy of Sciences
- American University of Armenia
- House-Museum of Aram Khachaturian
- The Writers Union of Armenia
- The Architects' Union of Armenia
- The public schools of: Anton Chekhov (No. 55), Republic of Argentina (No. 76), Hayrapet Hayrapetyan (No. 78) and Hakob Oshakan (No. 172)

=== Other structures ===
- The Lovers' Park
- Marshal Baghramyan underground station
- Barekamutyun underground station
- The Armenian Evangelical Church

== Gallery ==
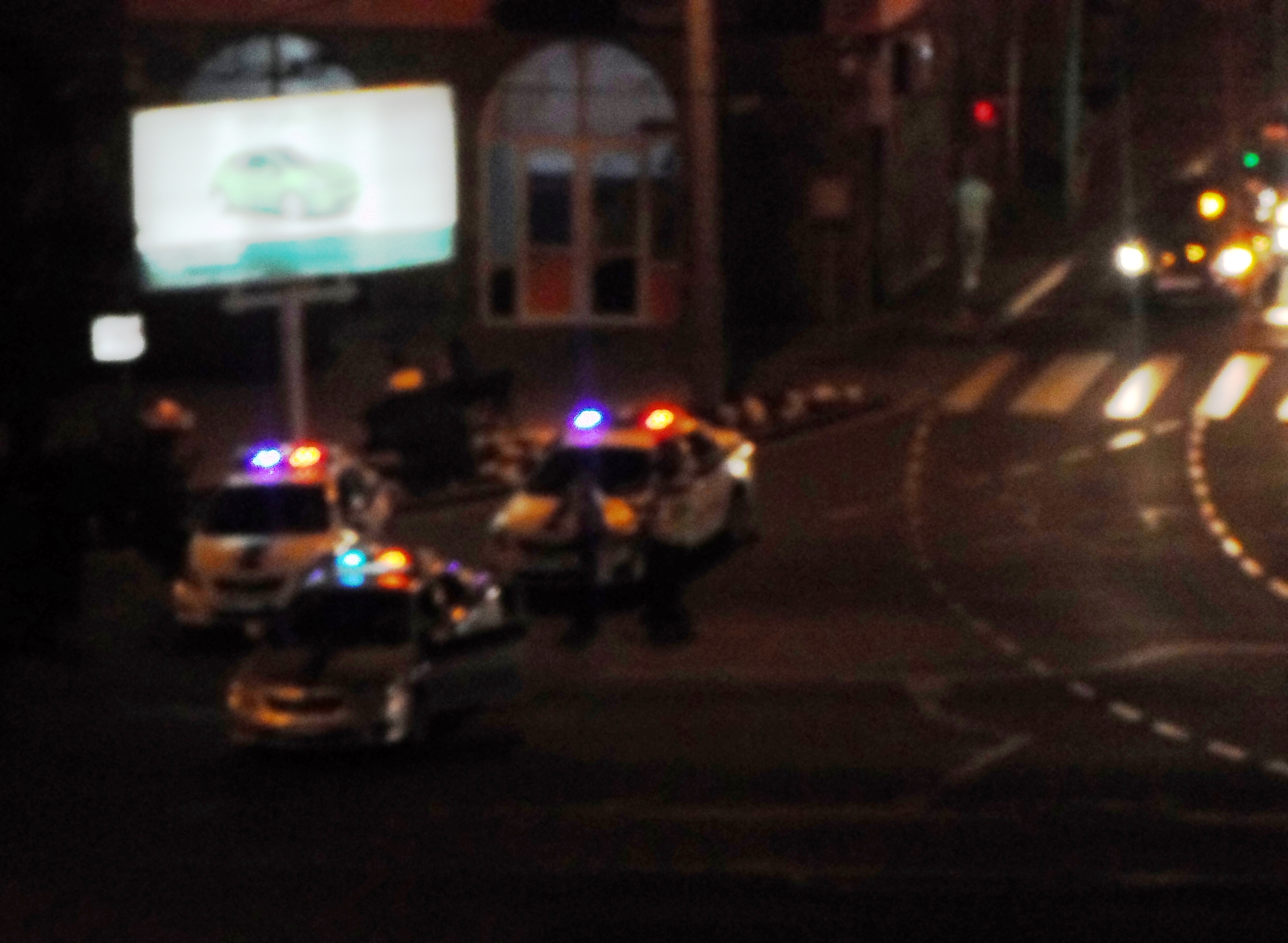
In Rally and Sit-in against the approved rise in electricity tariffs, June 22, 2015.

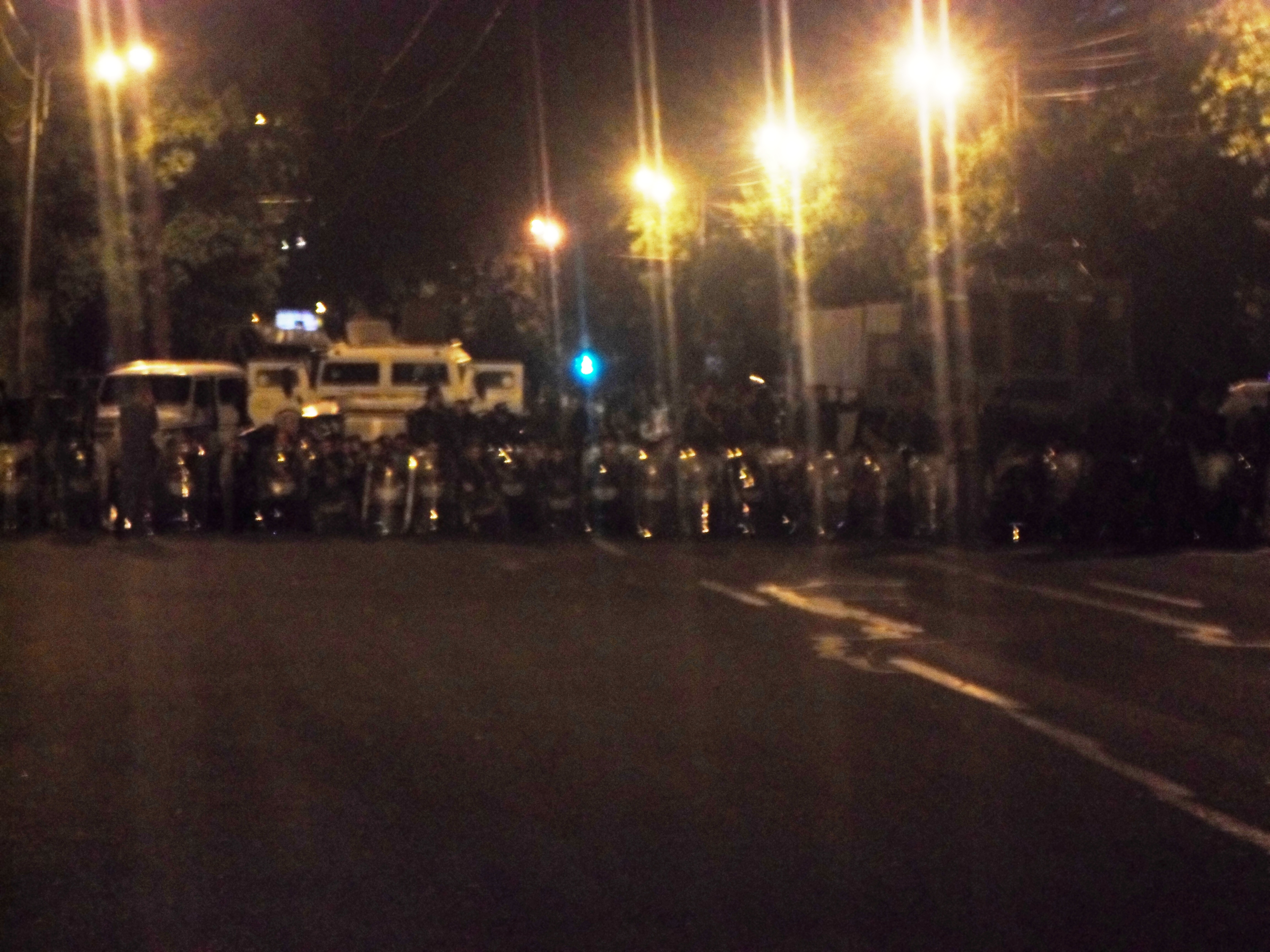
In Rally and Sit-in against the approved rise in electricity tariffs, June 22, 2015.

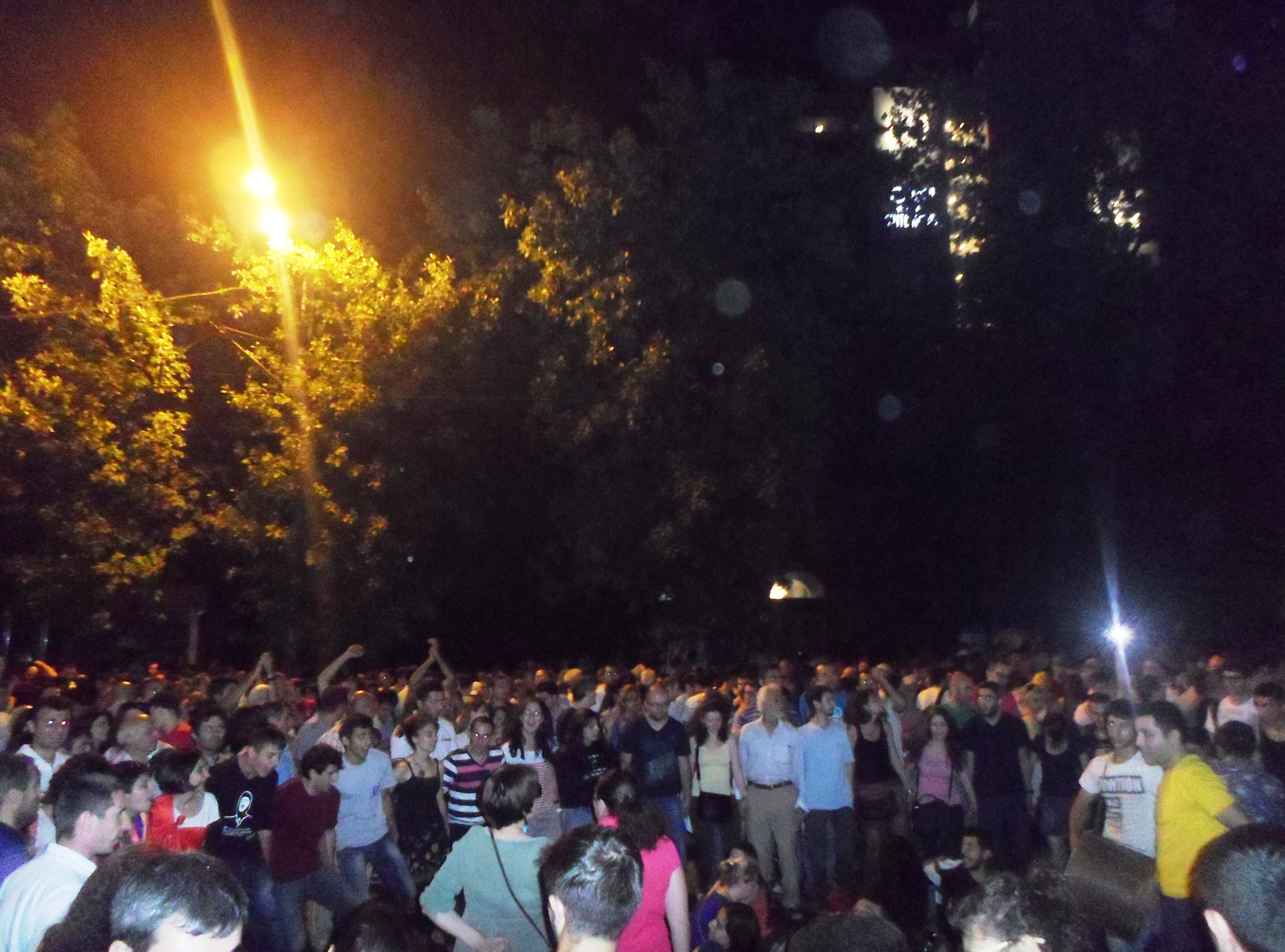
In Rally and Sit-in against the approved rise in electricity tariffs, June 22, 2015.

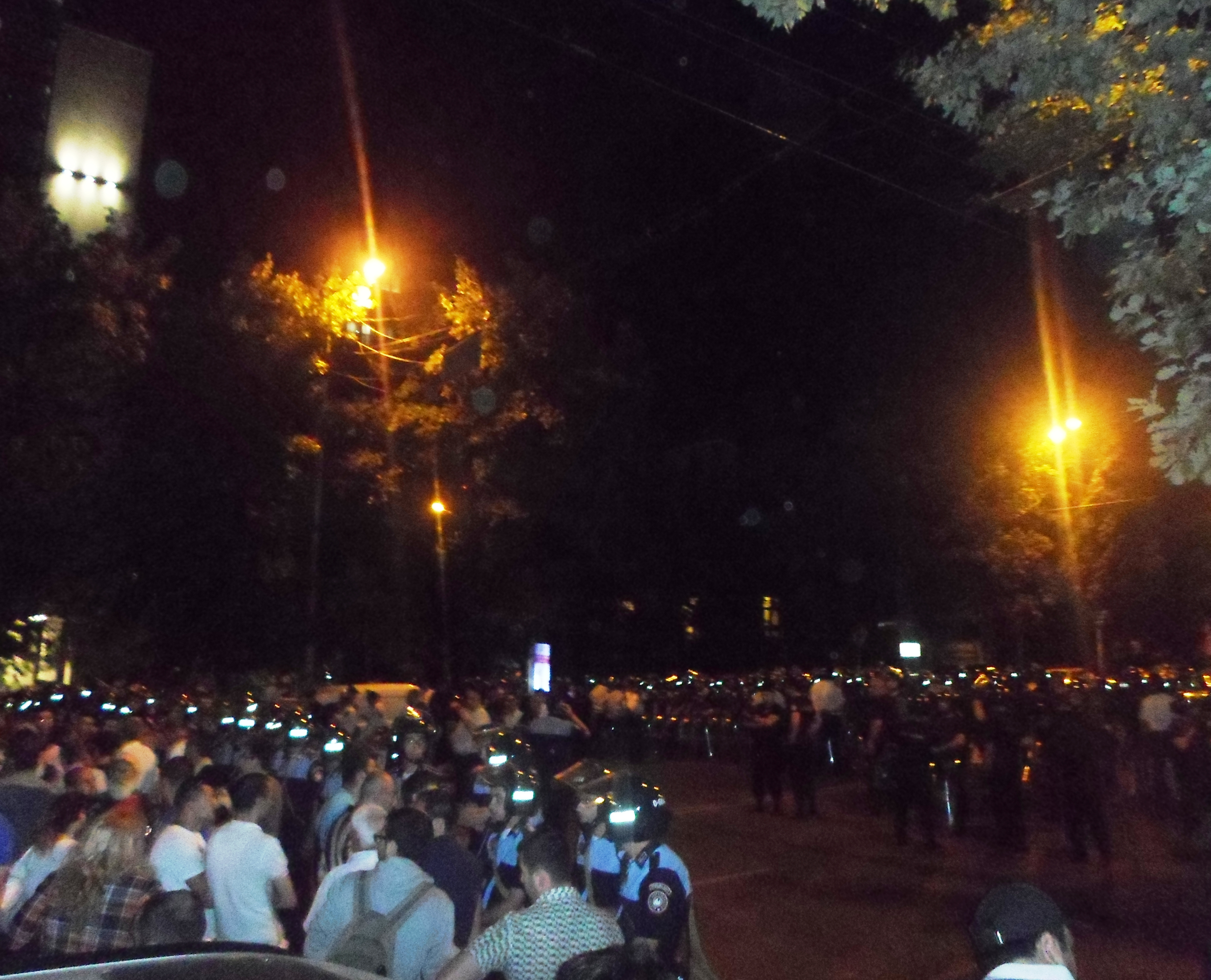
In Rally and Sit-in against the approved rise in electricity tariffs, June 22, 2015.
