= Government House, Yerevan =

Government House
- Կառավարական տուն
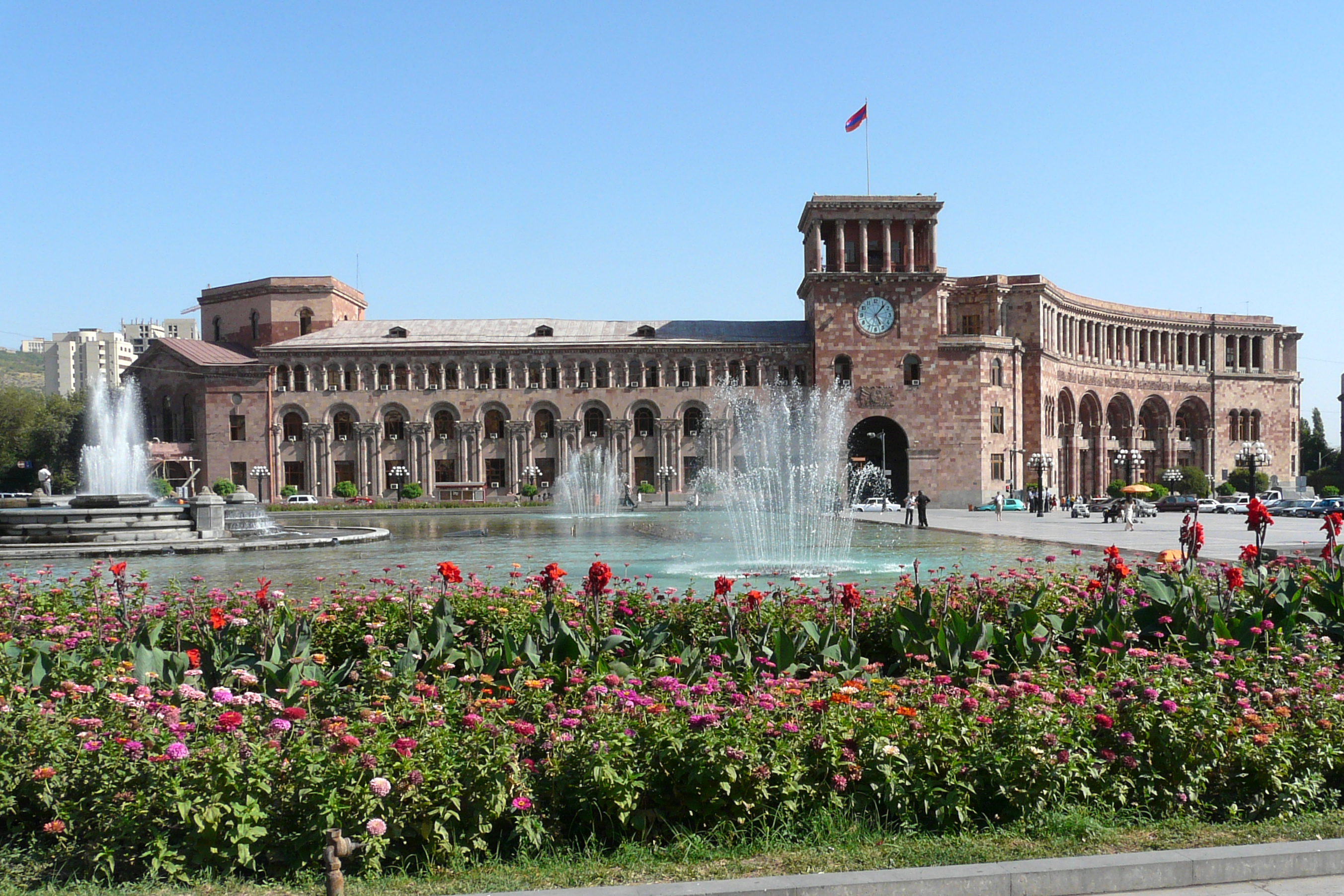
- Interactive map of the Government House area

General information
- Location: Republic Square, Yerevan, Armenia
- Coordinates: 40.1771°N 44.5139°E
- Current tenants: Nikol Pashinyan as Prime Minister of Armenia
- Construction started: 1926
- Completed: 1929
- Owner: Government of Armenia

Design and construction
- Architect: Alexander Tamanian

Website
- http://gov.am/en/building/

The Government House Number 1 (Armenian: Հայաստանի Հանրապետության կառավարական տուն; Hayastani Hanrapetut'yan Karavarakan Tun) is located on Republic Square, Yerevan.

It was designed by Alexander Tamanian, who was awarded the Soviet State Award in 1942 for this work.

It is the official residence of the prime minister of Armenia.

== See also ==
- Government of Armenia
- National Assembly
