= Armenian church architecture =

Best-known Armenian monasteries
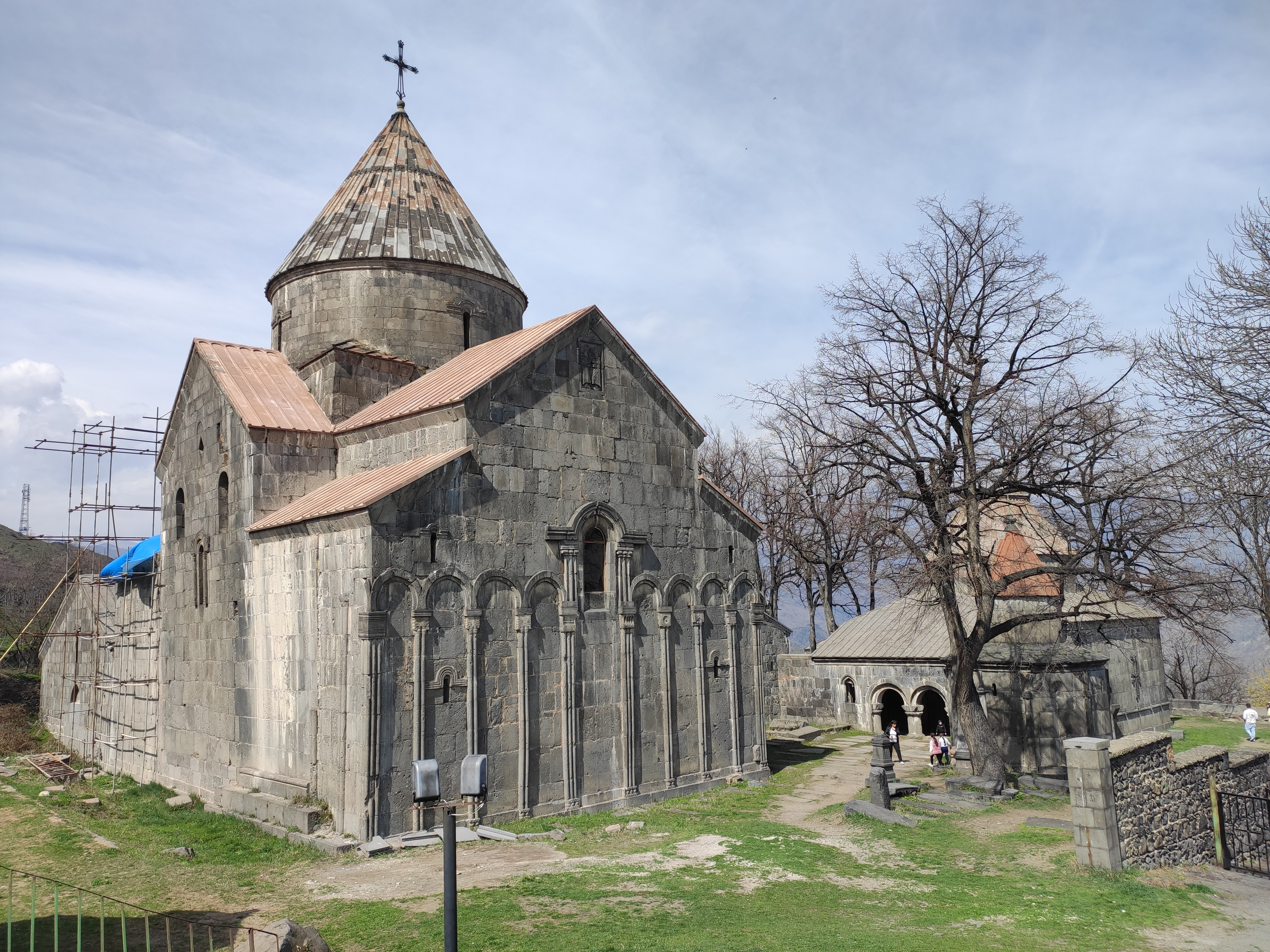
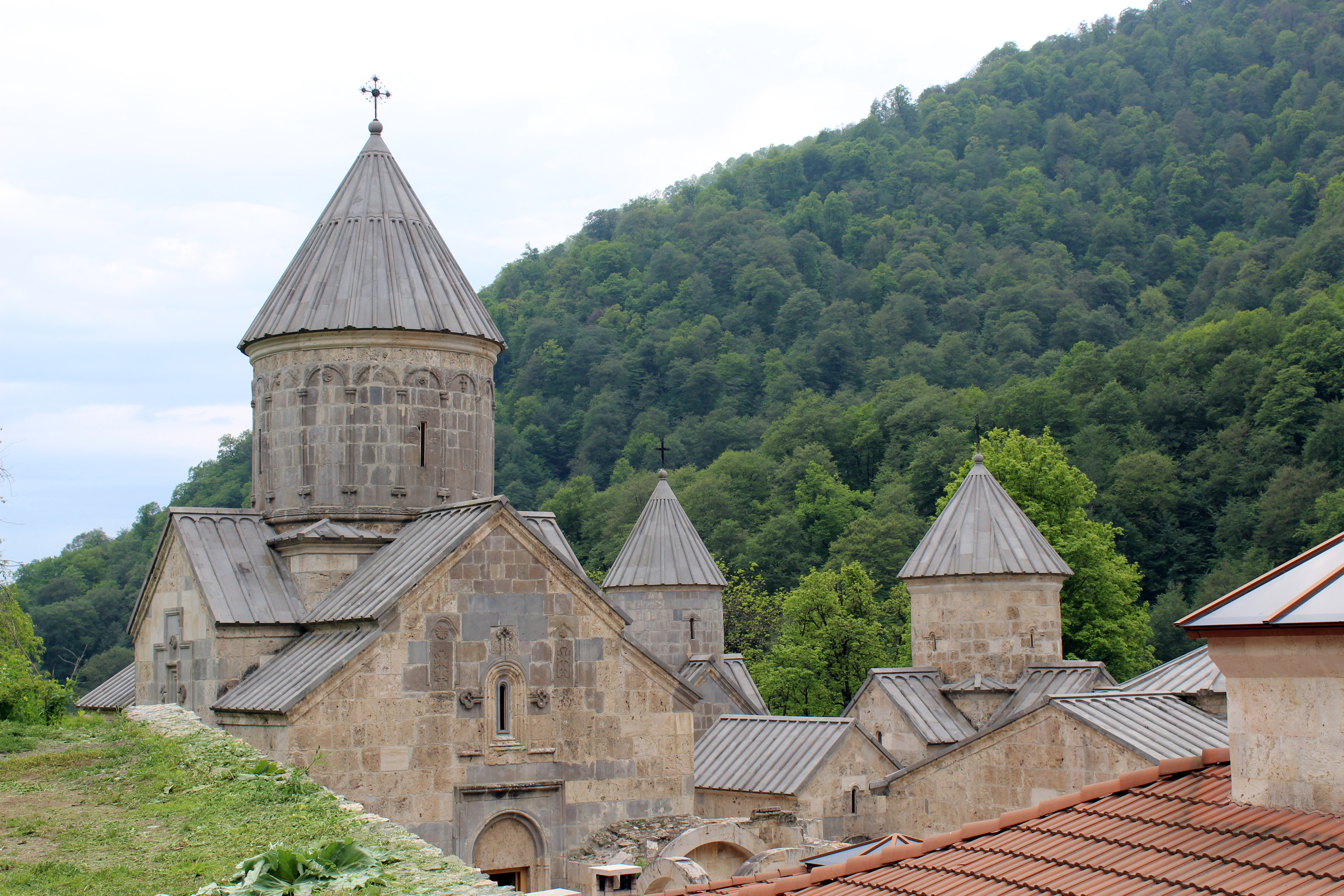
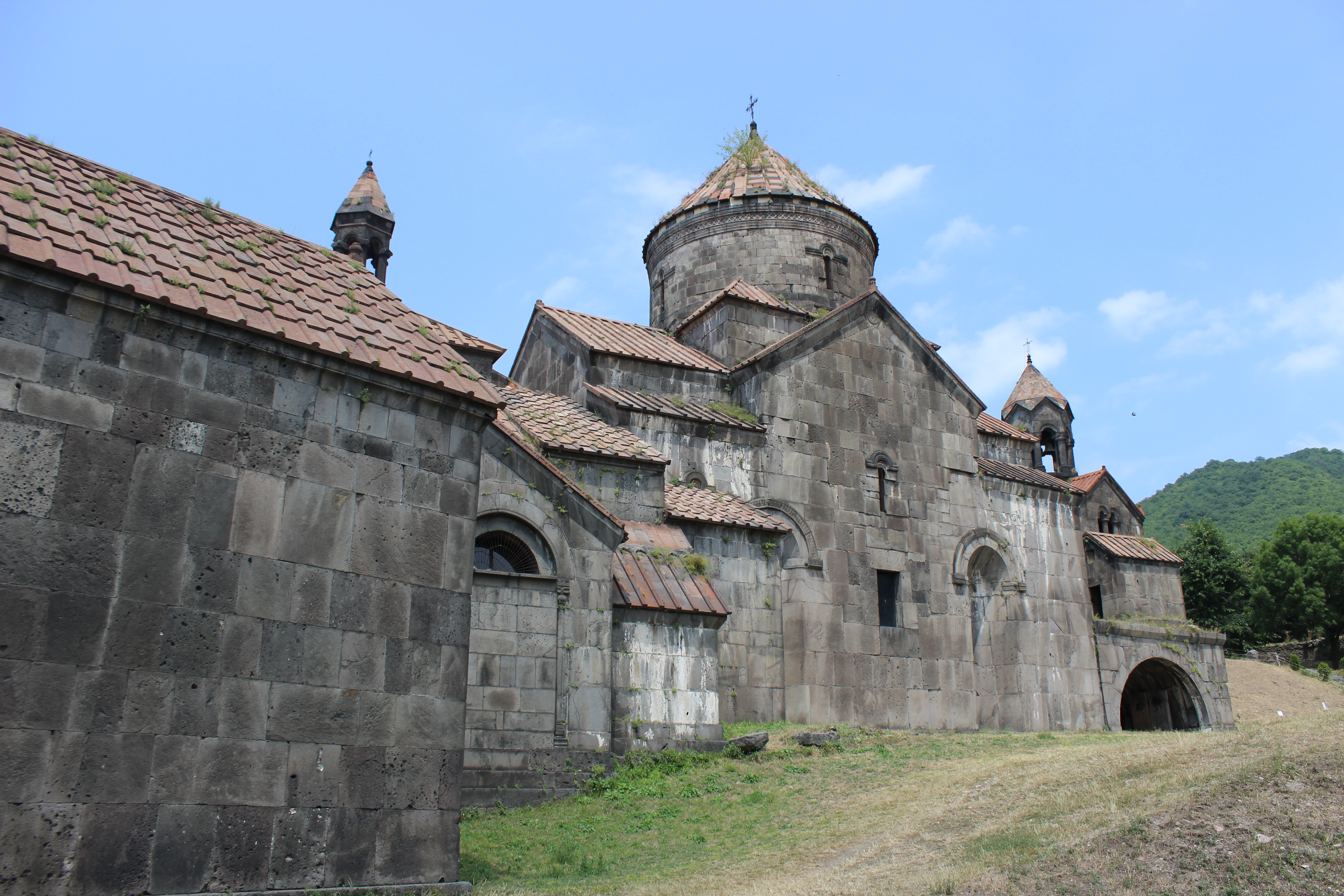
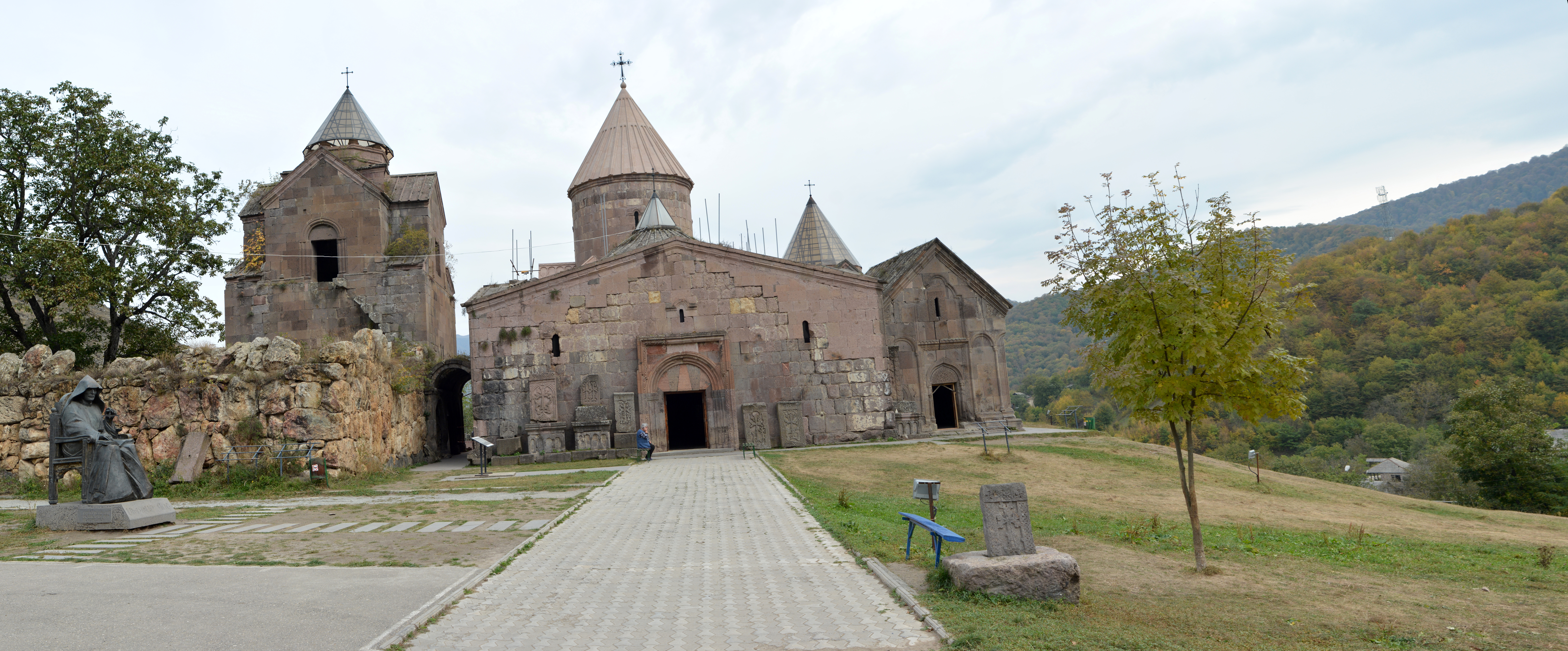
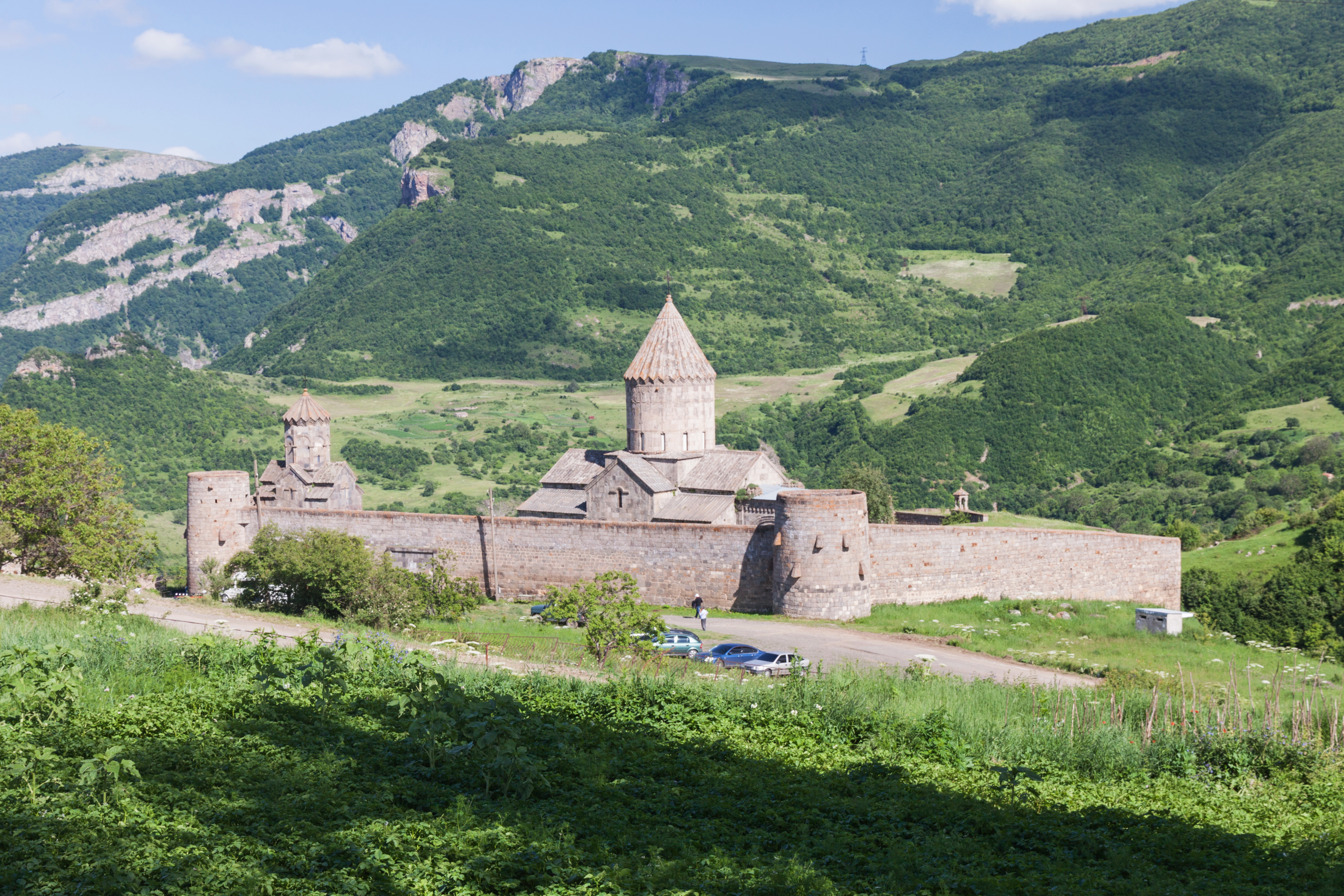
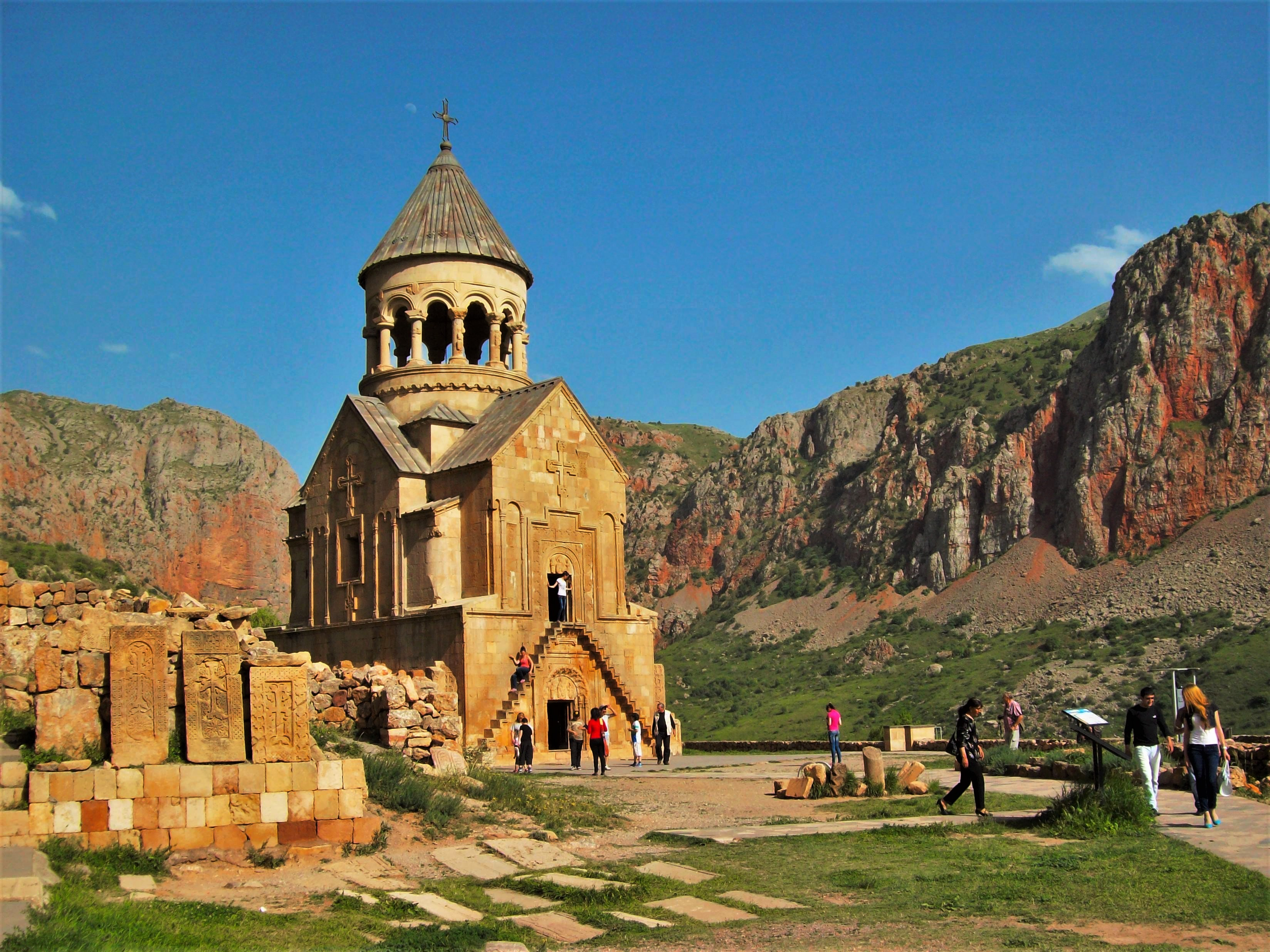
- From top to bottom: Sanahin Monastery; Haghartsin Monastery; Haghpat Monastery; Goshavank; Tatev Monastery; Noravank

Armenian church architecture is the distinctive style of church buildings that originated in the Armenian Highland during the Apostolic era of Christianity in the 1st century. It was developed over the last 1,900 years. According to professor Dickran Kouymjian (Ph.D. in Armenian Studies from Columbia University), the unique national style of Armenian church architecture came into being by the late 6th or early 7th century, probably becoming the first national style in Christian architecture, long before the Byzantine, Romanesque and Gothic or the less known Ethiopian, Scandinavian and Slavic styles were concretely formed.

== Characteristics ==
Christianity's institution as Armenia's official religion in 300 allowed new developments in Armenian architecture. The first Armenian churches were built on the orders of Saint Gregory the Illuminator, and were often built on top of pagan temples, imitating some aspects of Armenian pre-Christian architecture. Armenian churches particularly have several distinctive features with common characteristics:

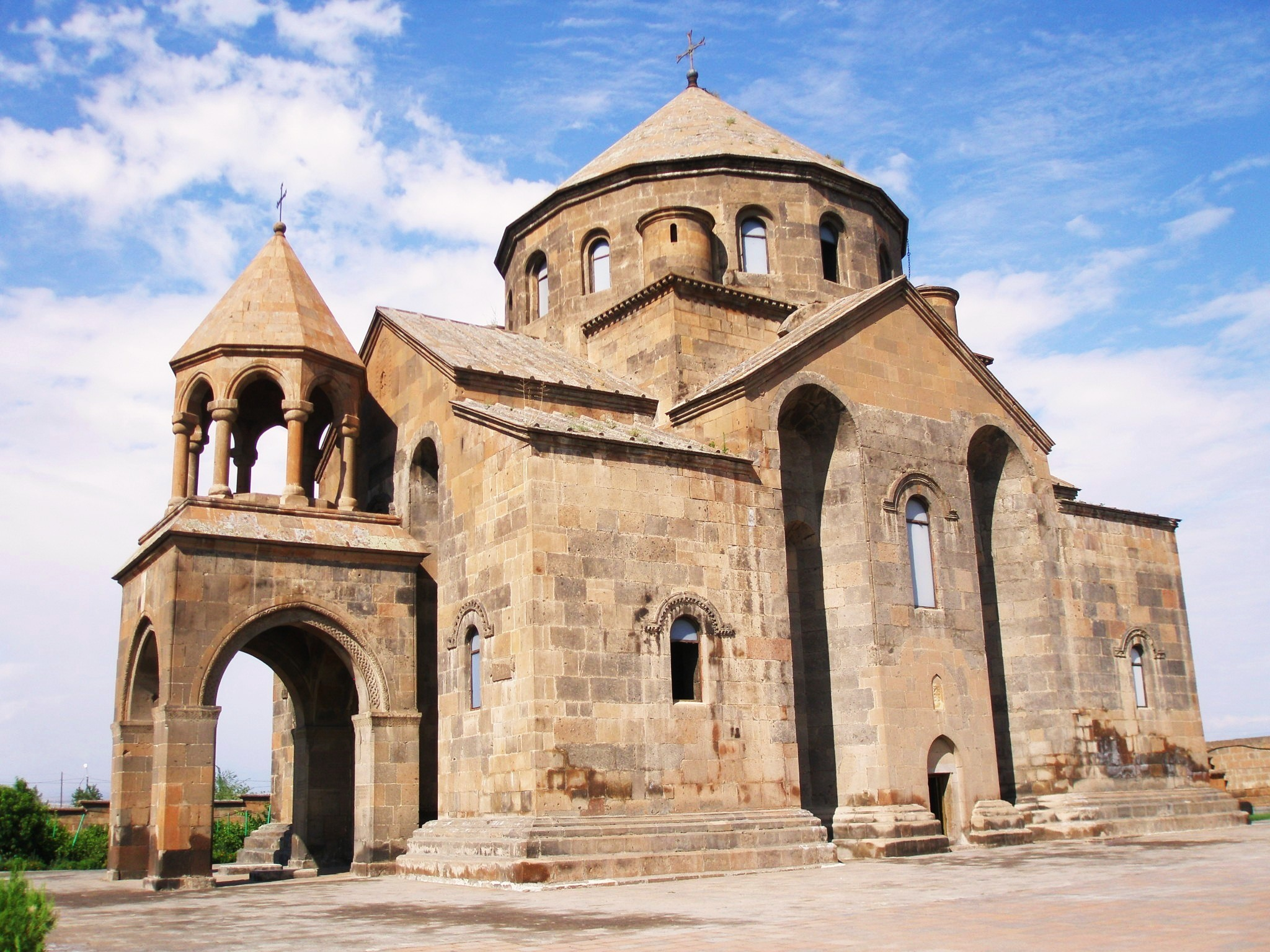
Saint Hripsime Church, 618 AD, with later alterations, an important early church.

- Pointed domes, reminiscent of the volcanic cone of Greater Ararat. The conical or semiconical radially segmented dome or cupola is mounted above vaulted ceilings on a cylindrical drum (usually polygonal on the outside, most often octagonal)
- The vertical emphasis of the whole structure, with the height often exceeding the length of a church
- Reinforcement of the verticality with tall, narrow windows
- Stone vaulted ceilings.
- Composed almost entirely of stone, usually volcanic tufa or basalt.
- A composite roof composed of finely-cut tufa shingles.
- Frescoes and carvings, if present, are usually ornate and include swirling intertwining grapevines and foliage.
- Heavy use of tall structural arches, both for supporting the cupola as part of the drum, the vaulted ceiling, and the vertical walls.
- Roofs intersecting to support the dome, both in basilicas and centrally-planned churches.
- Sculptural decoration of external walls, including figures.

== Classification of traditional Armenian churches ==
Within the bounds of the aforementioned common characteristics, individual churches display considerable variation which may reflect time, place, and the creativity of its designer. Toros Toramanian distinguished the following classical styles while studying these variations in the early 20th century:

The Classical Styles of Armenian Architecture According to Toros Toramanian
Style	Armenian nomenclature	Example
Basilica	Bazilik (Բազիլիկ)	Yererouk
Domed basilica	Gmbetakir bazilik (Գմբեթակիր բազիլիկ)	Tekor Basilica
Cruciform	Etchmiadznatip (Էջմիածնատիպ; literally "Etchmiadzin-type")	Etchmiadzin Cathedral
Vertical-emphasis rectangular	Oughghagitz karankiun (Ուղղագիծ քառանկյուն)	Saint Gayane Church
Radial	Sharavighayin (Շառավիղային)	Saint Hripsime Church
Circular	Zvartnotsatip (Զվարթնոցատիպ; literally "Zvartnots-type")	Zvartnots Cathedral

== Architectural Evolution ==
According to art historian Dr. Christina Maranci, Armenian church architecture has its roots in the 4th century, when Armenia became the first nation to adopt Christianity. Early churches were heavily influenced by Byzantine basilicas, but by the 7th century, they had developed distinctly Armenian structural and stylistic features.

== See also ==
- Armenian architecture
- Category:Armenian Apostolic churches
- Category:Armenian Apostolic monasteries
