= Yererouk =

Armenian church

Yereruyk
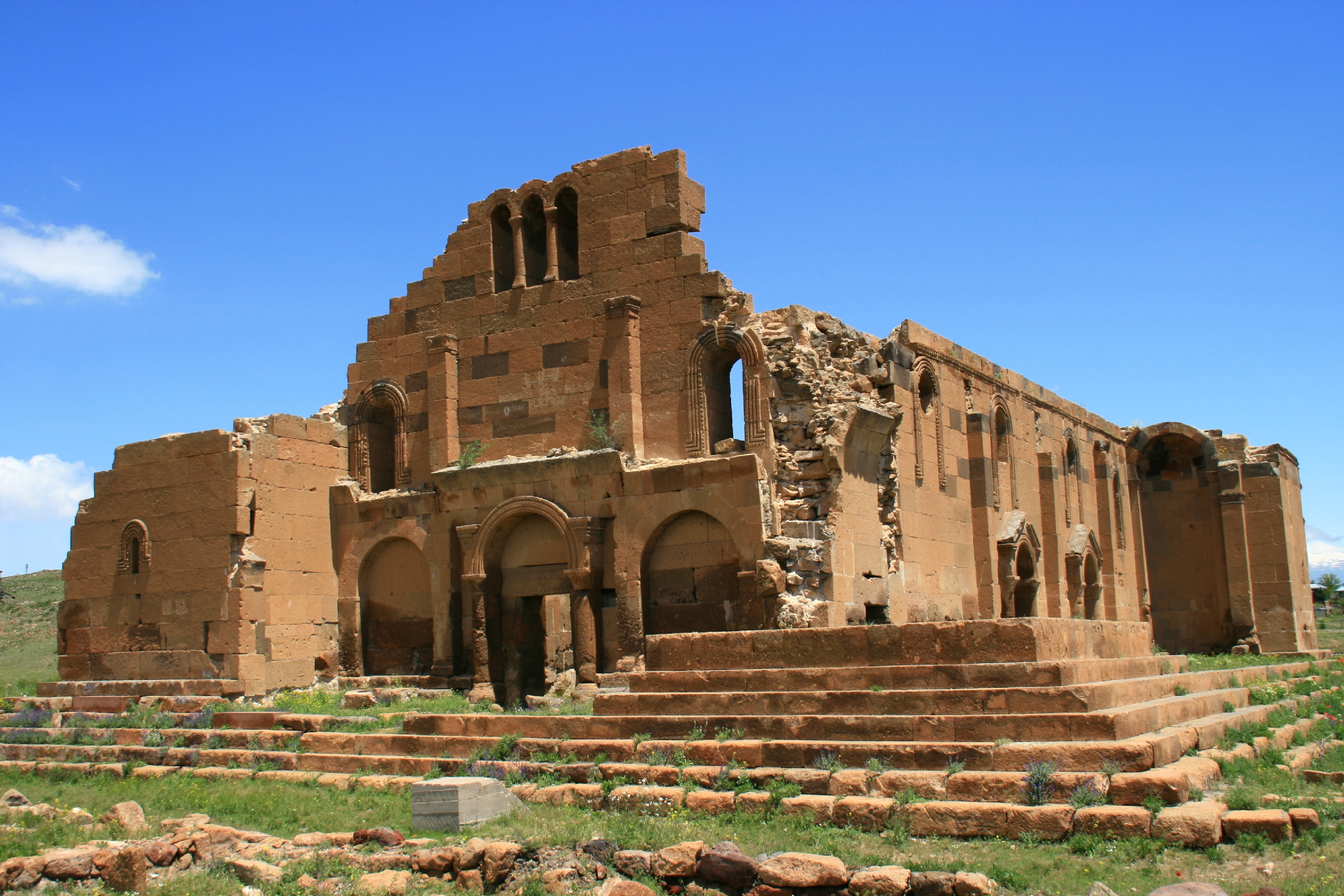
- The ruins of Yererouk Basilica

- Location within Armenia Location within Shirak

Religion
- Affiliation: Armenian Apostolic Church
- Province: Shirak
- Status: Ruined

Location
- Location: Anipemza, Shirak Province, Armenia
- Coordinates: 40.439722°N 43.609167°E

Architecture
- Type: Basilica
- Style: Armenian
- Completed: 4th–5th centuries
- Height (max): 100 feet 0 inches (30.48 m)

Yererouk (Armenian: Երերույքի տաճար, Yereruyk’i tachar), also Yereruyk or Ererouk, is an ancient Armenian church near the village of Anipemza in the Shirak Province of Armenia. Yererouk was built on a plateau near the Akhurian River, which defines the frontier with Turkey, about 5 km southeast of the ancient city of Ani.

The basilica is considered one of the ancient examples of Armenian architecture, belonging to the Paleo-Christian epoch (4th–6th century). It was initially started in the 4th century, then was postponed in the 5th century and finally completed in the 6th century. Because the basilica is not mentioned in any historical sources, the dates are hypothetical. However, the most recent studies have analysed the architectural characteristics with stratigraphic tests, the study of the sculptural decoration and epigraphy, the comparation with similar churches in Syria.

Because the basilica of Yererouk is one of the earliest surviving Christian monuments in Armenia, it was added to the UNESCO World Heritage Tentative List on August 25, 1995, in the Cultural category.

== Etymology and history ==
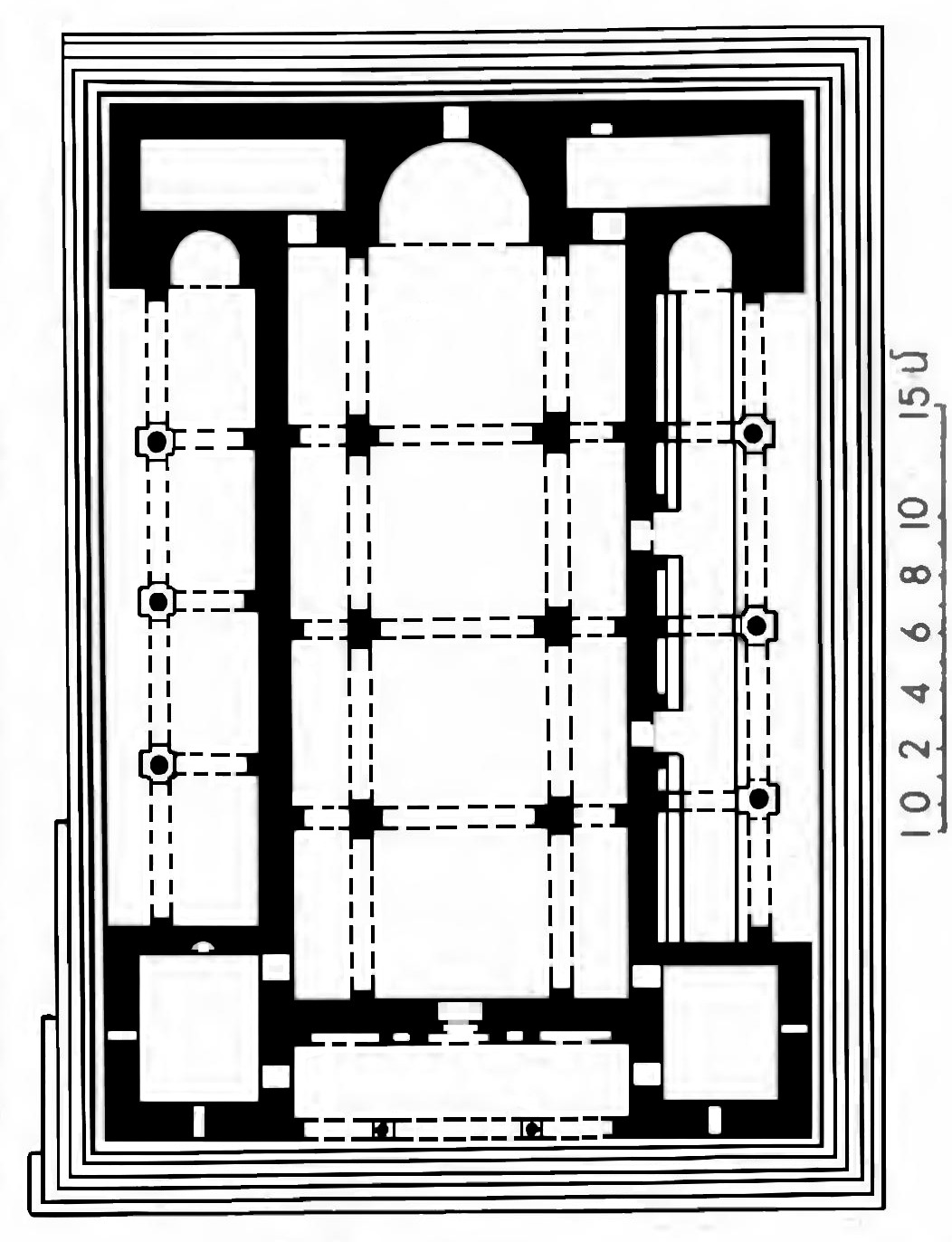
Plan of Yererouk basilica

Yererouk means quivering in the Armenian language. According to popular tradition, the name of the temple was derived from its unique architectural solution of the structure which seems quivering on its 6 columns for viewers from a distance.

Yererouk is one of the earliest examples of the Armenian church architecture and one of the greatest structures of the early medieval ages that partly survived. According to Toros Toramanian, Yererouk is a clear and perhaps the earliest example of the basilica style of the Armenian church buildings that are constructed on pillars. The church was surrounded with thick walls. From the surrounding buildings, underground rooms and the water reservoir, it becomes clear that the church was the centre of a developed residential community.

Yererouk dates back to the 4th and 5th centuries. It is located in the Shirak canton of the Ayrarat province of Ancient Armenia. Not much is known about the founders of the basilica. However, the church was renovated during the 11th century by the efforts of King Hovhannes-Smbat's wife.

== The basilica ==
The building, with three aisles, structured with thick lateral walls, is one of the biggest Armenian churches of the period. With arcades on the north, west and south sides, two little chapels near the apse and two absidal niches at the end of the lateral arcades, the basilica in origin could be covered wooden trusses. The north-east chapel keeps the most part of two superimposed vaults which the superior is inclined (taller near the nave).

Yererouk Basilica is similar to Syrian basilicas in the architectural system (high angular towers protruding on the West facade) and in the sculptural decoration (decorative band on the windows).

At the East end of the South facade there is a Greek inscription similar to the one in the Syrian church of Deir Sem'an at the end of the 5th century.

With Tekor (end of the 5th century) and Zvartnots, Yererouk Basilica is one of the rare Armenian churches totally built on a base of 5–6 steps like a crepidoma. The archeological excavations revealed the lack of a continuous platform under the building which foundations are directly on rock.

The basilica was a martyrial sanctuary: an inscription on the pilaster at the north-east corner of the apse says: "martyrion [...] of the Precursor and the Protomartyr", that are Saint John Baptist and Saint Stephen.

Along the south and north sides there are tympanum portals adorned with dentils with inscribed an arch, modeled with a banded cornice based on two columns with acanthus leaves capitals.

The west facade is characterized by two windows like the ones on the principal facade, with different decorative elements and, in the high part of the facade, with a three-mullioned window that lights the nave.

The sculptural decorations, realized with the technique of bass-relief on the architrave and capitals in the apse and on the head of the arcades, give importance to the emblematic and apotropaic motive of the Maltese cross (with four identical limbs) inscribed in a medallion, sometimes decorated with animals and/or trees. The central crossed medallion is often completed by two lateral medallions made like rose-windows or daisies.

The basilica had to be equipped with a painted decoration but now can be seen only on the apse window and on a composition on the west portal architrave in the south facade.

== Gallery ==
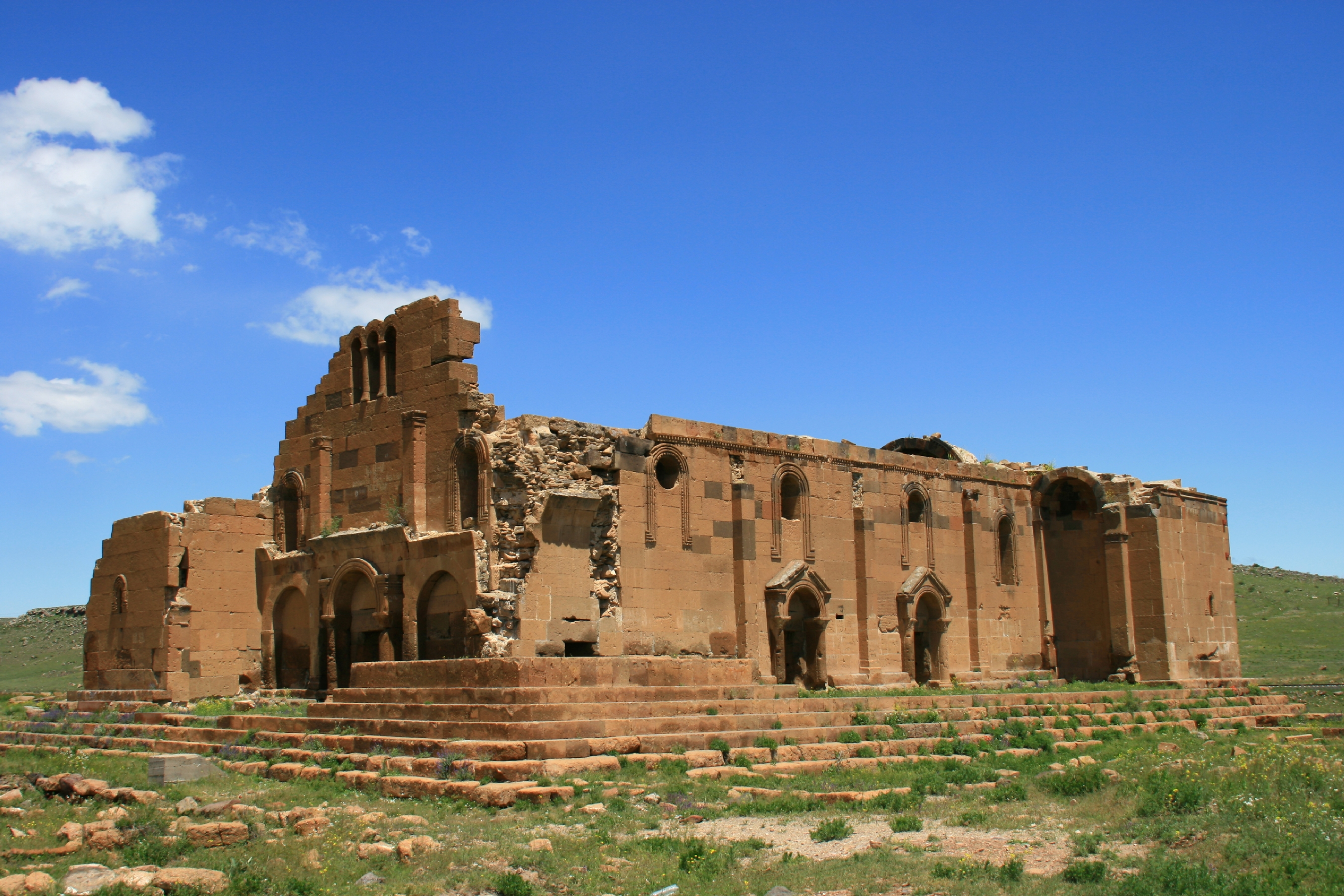

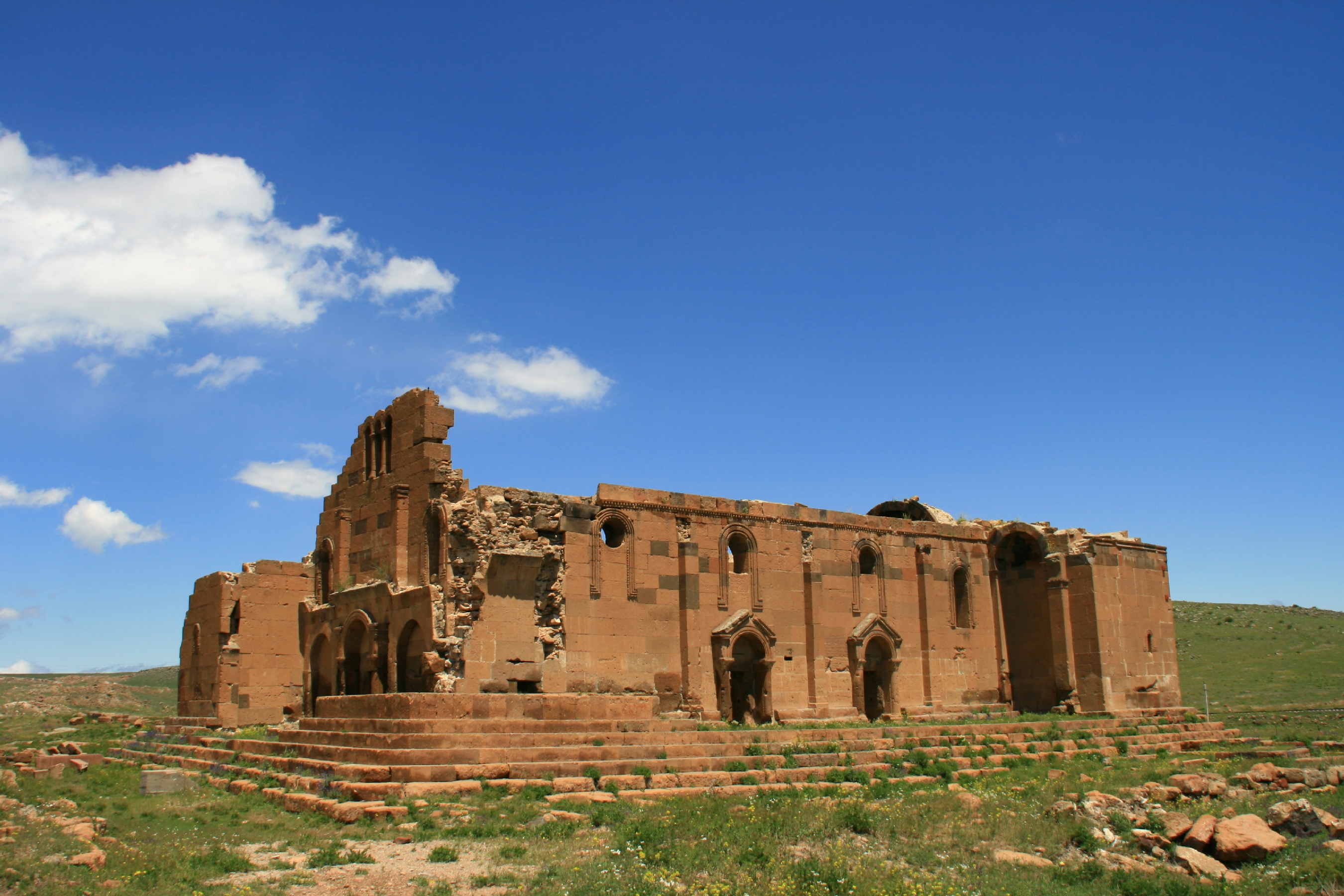

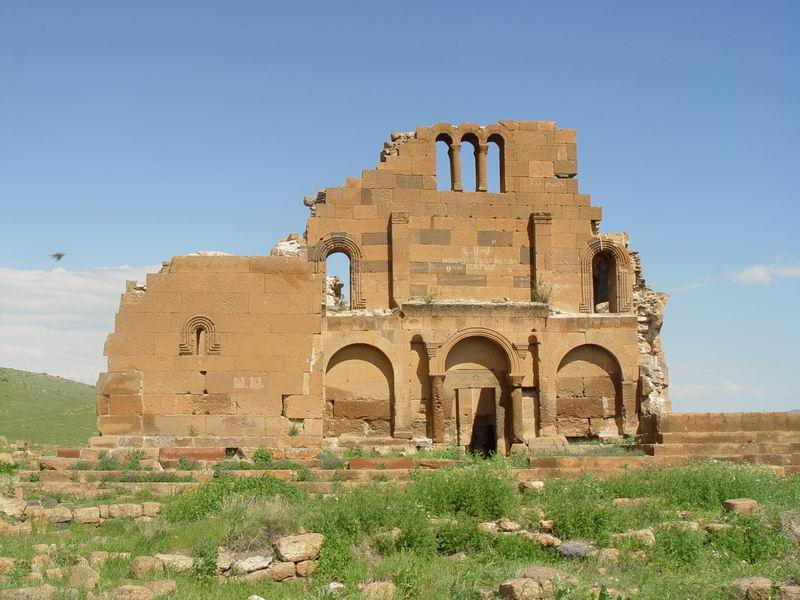

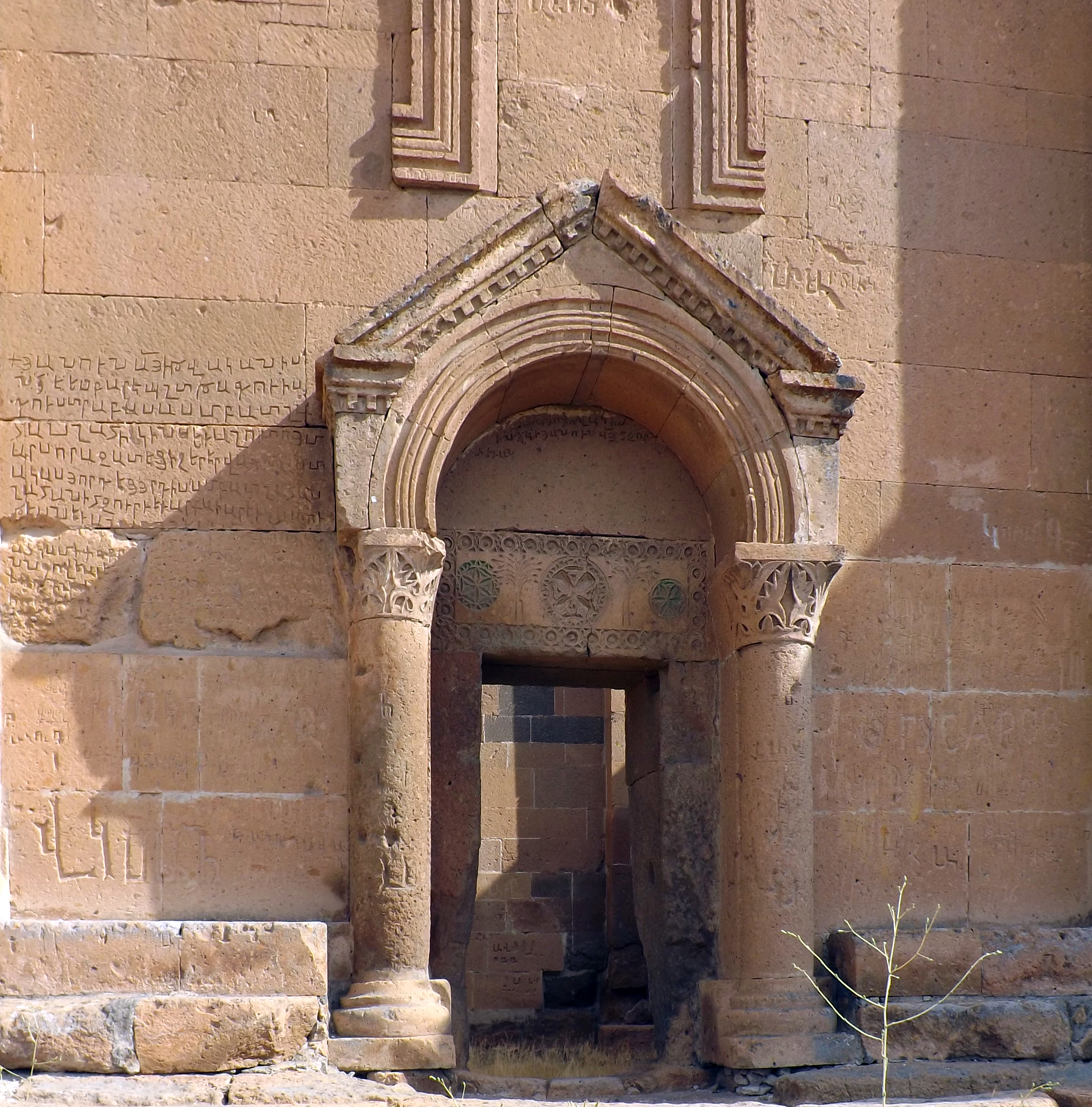

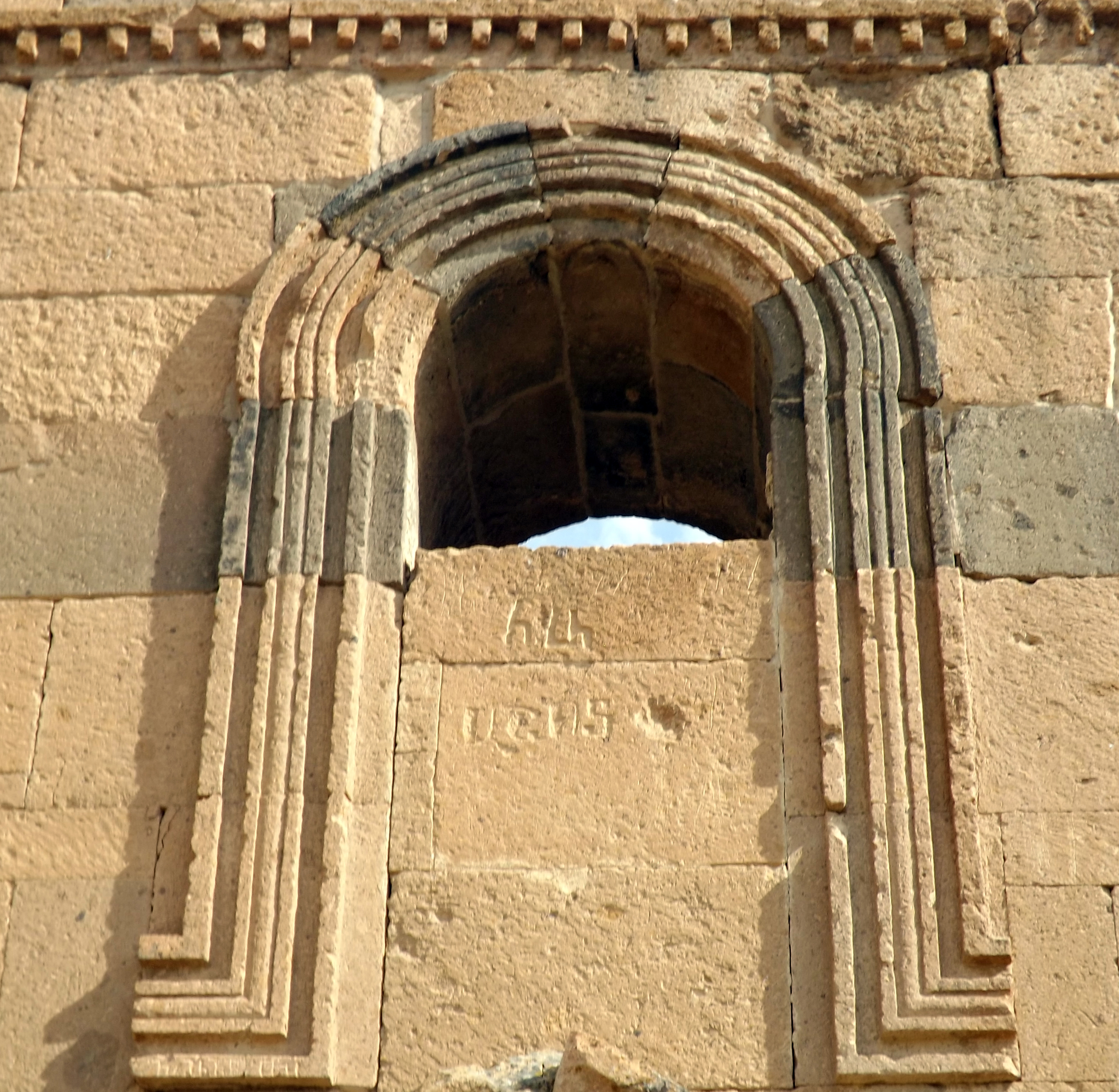

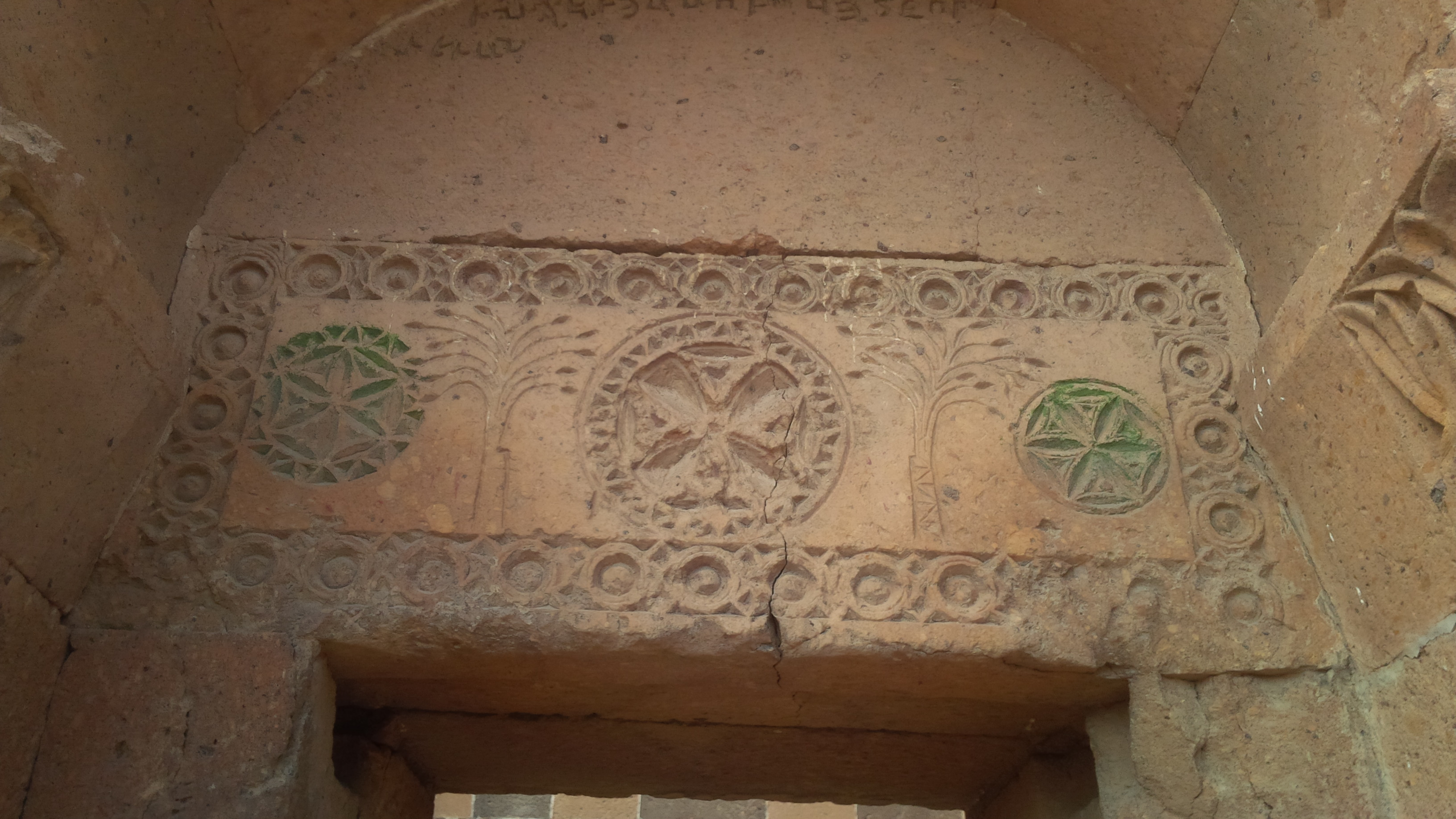

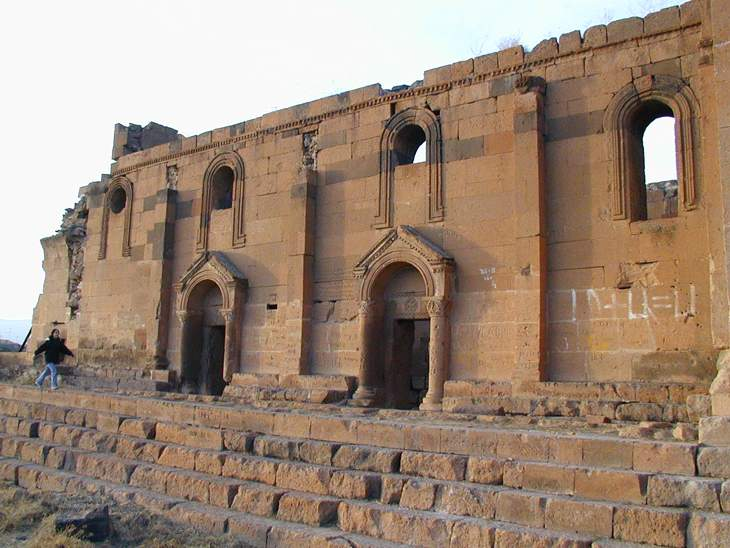

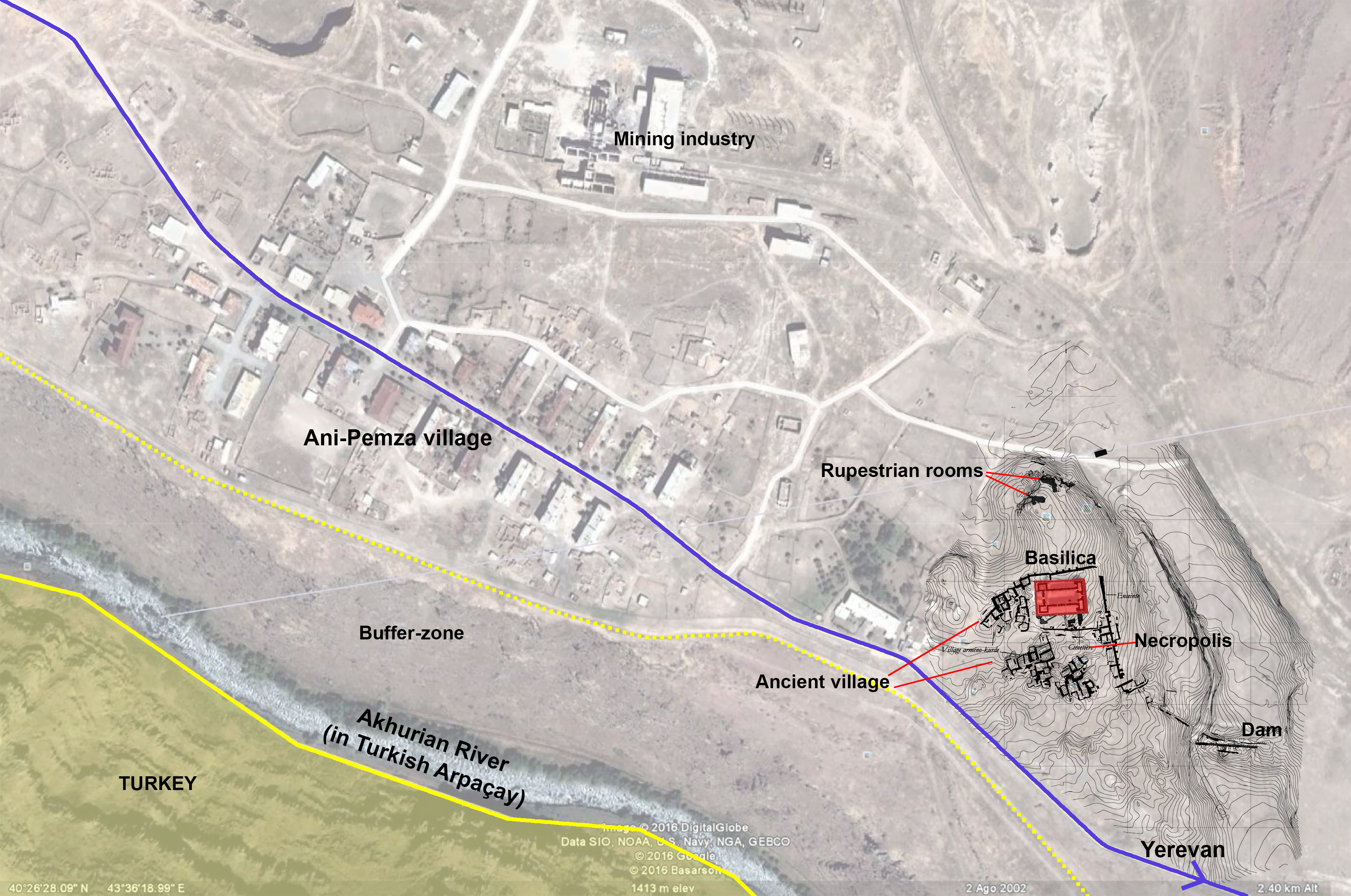

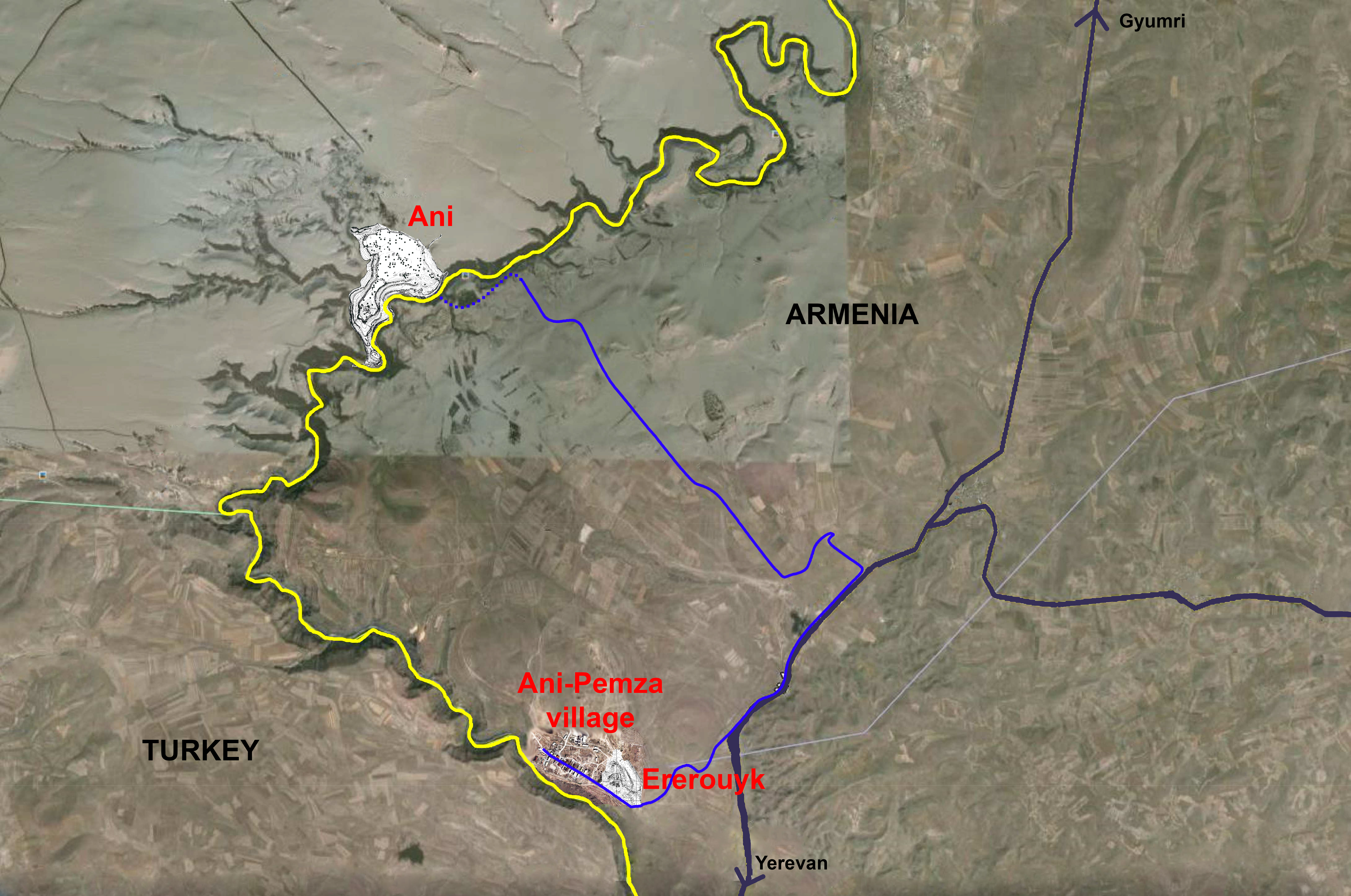

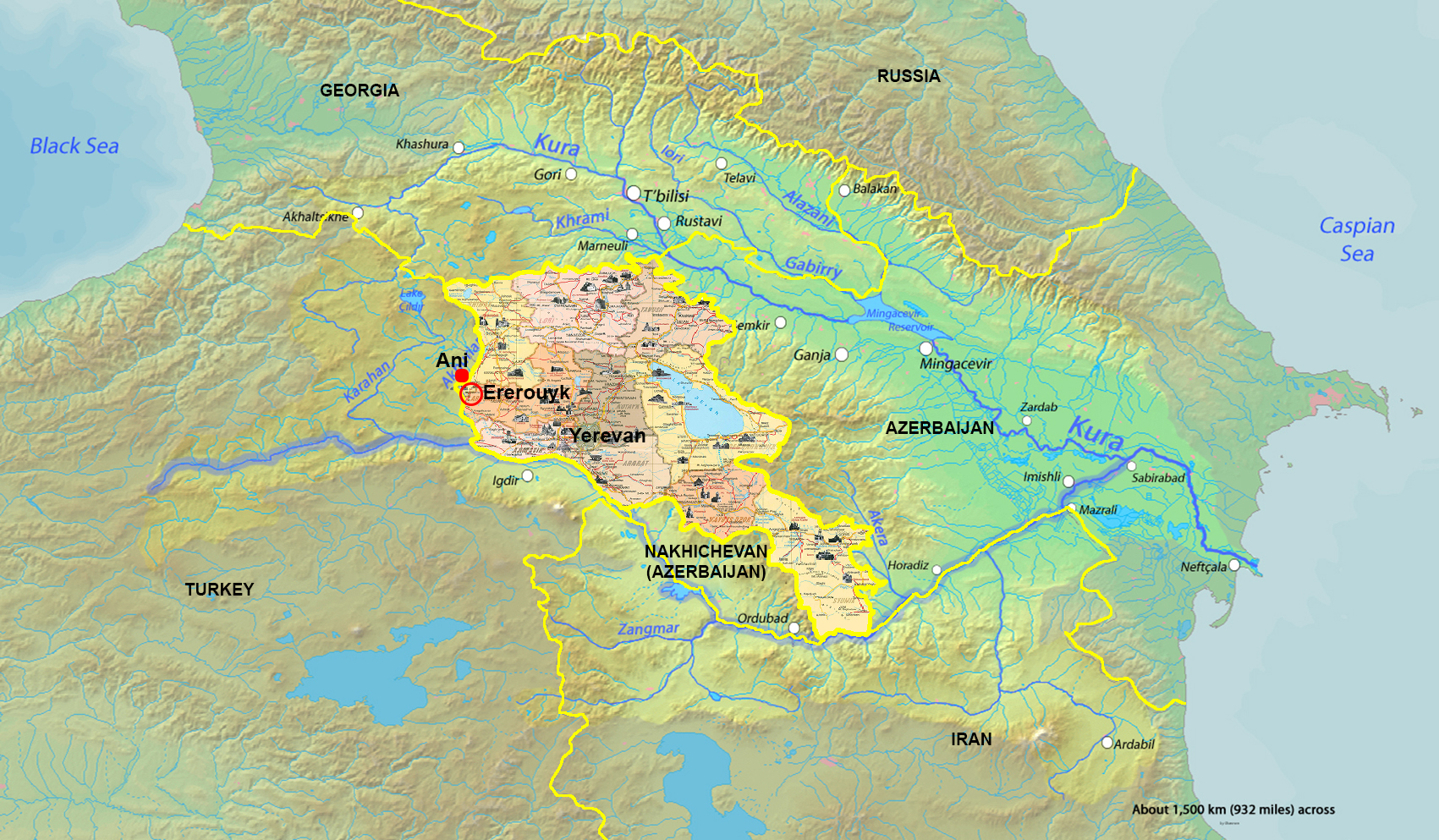

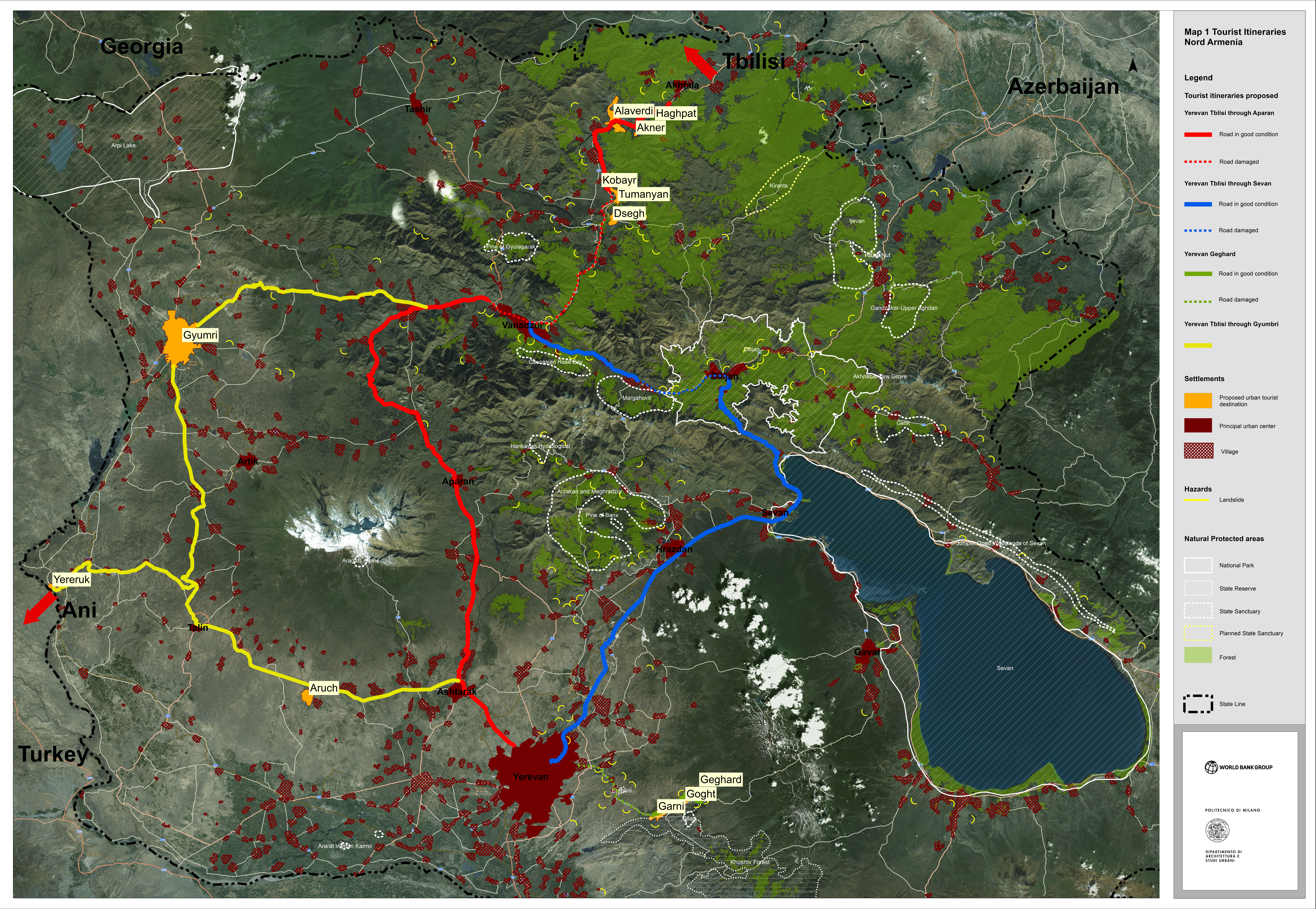
