= Anipemza =

Anipemza Անիպեմզա
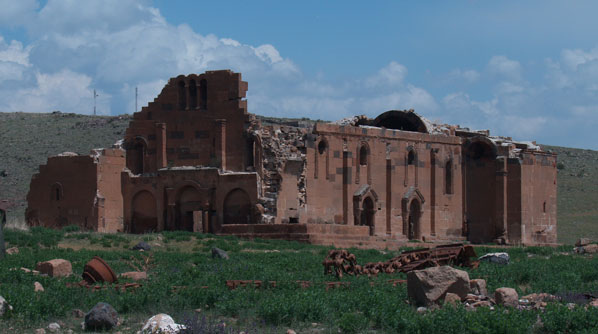
- The ruins of Yererouk Basilica in Anipemza

- Location within Armenia Location within Shirak
- Coordinates: 40°26′55″N 43°36′15″E
- Country: Armenia
- Province: Shirak
- Municipality: Ani

Area
  - Total: 67 km^{2} (26 sq mi)
- Elevation: 1,430 m (4,690 ft)

Population (2011)
  - Total: 260
- Time zone: UTC+4

Anipemza (Armenian: Անիպեմզա) is a village in the Ani Municipality of the Shirak Province of Armenia. The Statistical Committee of Armenia reported its population was 523 in 2010, up from 349 at the 2001 census.

Anipemza is located on the closed Armenia–Turkey border on a bank of Akhurian River on which opposite coast there are ruins of the ancient Armenian city of Ani in Turkey. In 7 km to the north from village there is Ry station 'Ani' of Armenian Railway. Anipemza was founded in 4th century by Kamsarakan princes. The village Anipemza is well known for ruins of Yererouk basilica of 4th-5th century. Near to village the industrial complex of building materials (processing of Pumice, Tuff, Andesite) is located.

The oral witness obtained by interviewing the residents have established that the new Anipemza, since 1926, was a village for the orphans of Armenian genocide of 1915 and then has been also a penal colony for forced labor for the dissidents of the Soviet regime in Armenia.

== Demographics ==
Historical population
Year	Pop.	±% p.a.
1831	647	—
1873	2,359	+3.13%
1931	529	−2.54%
1939	1,119	+9.82%
1972	710	−1.37%
1979	558	−3.38%
2001	349	−2.11%
2011	260	−2.90%

Men make up 49% and women 51% of the population. The age percentage of the population is: children 32%, able to work 53%, adult 15%. The population occupation is ranching and seasonally mines in the industrial complex near the village.

== Climate ==
The climate in the village is temperate mountainous. The winter is long and cold with constant snow cover, the summer is hot and moist. Annual precipitation amount is 500/600 mm. The highest temperature in summer is 30 °C and the lowest temperature in winter is −20 °C. Downfalls amount is 450mm.

== History ==
Anipemza is one of the first industrial cities founded during the Soviet period. It is related to the foundation of the factory in 1926. The founders are mainly the inhabitants of the neighbouring Zagha village destroyed after Anipemza's foundation. According to the testimonials of the older interviewed inhabitants of Anipemza, Zagha was a village who hosted the orphans of 1915 genocide from some villages of the west Armenia (mainly Kars) and from Gyumri (Alexandropol at that time) in 1916 to 1920. Americans took the population from the orphanage of Leninakan to work in mine. With the opening activities of the industrializing quarry, specialists were coming with their families from other nearby villages and cities too in order to work there. The settlement was almost completed in 1936, when the factory had more workers and specialists. After the administrative-territorial division of the area in provinces, in 1936 Anipemza was included in the province of Ani, and in 1996, according to the division of Armenia, it was announced as a village and was included in Shirak's province.

Some orphans who were moved from Greece during the genocide, have moved to work in Anipemza in 1934. The salary of mineworkers was very high; people were working on 3 shifts. There was a lot of work. They should load 100 wagons for Kaspi, Ararat, and other sites. The citizens said that during the Soviet period, life in Anipemza was perfect because of the wealth and the possibility to have a job; also the residents of other villages were coming to work there.

The village had many facilities: hospital, pharmacy, kindergarten, laborers' canteen, library, house of culture and cine-theatre, garden etc. There was also a hotel for the businessperson (now it is residential). The garden, visible from the main street, is enclosed by a fence and nowadays is used as a private vegetable garden and orchard. There are three shops which serve Gyumri too.

In the village there was also a forced labor settlement camp for Armenian dissidents during the Soviet period. The area of the prisoners was fenced and they were working in a mine. The prisoners were not in contact with regular people without permission and they lived in the building in front of the cultural house. In the Soviet period the village was protected but never had an enclosure, only a toll bar as a frontier village. The entrance was possible only with special pass until 1985. In that period there were so many people that in a single apartment there was more than one family because there was not enough room for all to live there.

Now Anipemza appears as a company town or a garden city and today it is protected by national governments or even by UNESCO for its historical significance sociological and cultural as well as urban and architectural.
