= List of earthquakes in 1935 =

Earthquakes in 1935
Approximate epicenters of notable earthquakes in 1935
- 4.0–5.9 magnitude
- 6.0–6.9 magnitude
- 7.0–7.9 magnitude
- 8.0+ magnitude
- Strongest: New Guinea, Sandaun Province (Magnitude 7.8) September 20
- Deadliest: Pakistan, Baluchistan, Pakistan (Magnitude 7.5) May 30 60,000 deaths
- Total fatalities: 67,489

Number by magnitude
- 9.0+: 0

This is a list of earthquakes in 1935. Only magnitude 6.0 or greater earthquakes appear on the list. Lower magnitude events are included if they have caused death, injury or damage. Events which occurred in remote areas will be excluded from the list as they wouldn't have generated significant media interest. All dates are listed according to UTC time. Among the bigger earthquakes of the year was the devastating Pakistan event in May which left 60,000 dead. Taiwan also fared badly with three magnitude 7.0+ events and in particular a quake in April left 3,276 dead. Other large quakes struck New Guinea, Dutch East Indies, British Solomon Islands and somewhat unusually Italian Libya. Turkey and Iran saw their share of the action as well with substantial deaths being caused by several quakes over the year.

== Overall ==
=== By death toll ===
Rank	Death toll	Magnitude	Location	MMI	Depth (km)	Date
1	60,000	7.5	Pakistan, Baluchistan, Pakistan	X (Extreme)	25.0	May 30
2	3,276	7.0	Taiwan, Taichung City	VIII (Severe)	15.0	April 20
3	2,746	6.5	Taiwan, Miaoli County	( )	30.0	July 16
4	690	6.4	Iran, Mazandaran Province	IX (Violent)	15.0	April 11
5	540	6.0	Turkey, Agri Province	( )	35.0	May 1
6	100	6.0	China, Sichuan Province	VIII (Severe)	35.0	December 18
7	60	6.0	Iran, Mazandaran Province	( )	35.0	March 5
8	51	6.8	Greece, southern Aegean Sea	VIII (Severe)	80.0	February 25

- Note: At least 10 casualties

=== By magnitude ===
Rank	Magnitude	Death toll	Location	MMI	Depth (km)	Date
1	7.8	0	New Guinea, Sandaun Province	( )	30.0	September 20
= 2	7.6	0	British Solomon Islands, western Makira	( )	35.0	December 15
= 2	7.6	0	Dutch East Indies, Batu Islands	VIII (Severe)	35.0	December 28
3	7.5	60,000	Pakistan, Baluchistan, Pakistan	X (Extreme)	25.0	May 30
4	7.3	0	Mexico, Chiapas	( )	35.0	December 14
= 5	7.2	0	Fiji	( )	450.0	July 29
= 5	7.2	0	Dutch East Indies, northern Sumatra	( )	25.0	August 3
= 5	7.2	0	France, Loyalty Islands	( )	20.0	August 17
= 5	7.2	0	Russian SFSR, Kuril Islands	( )	35.0	September 11
= 6	7.1	0	New Hebrides	( )	185.0	June 24
= 6	7.1	0	Japan, off the east coast of Honshu	( )	15.0	October 18
= 7	7.0	3,276	Taiwan, Taichung City	VIII (Severe)	15.0	April 20
= 7	7.0	0	Taiwan, off the southeast coast	( )	15.0	September 4
= 7	7.0	0	New Guinea, West Sepik Province	( )	35.0	September 20
= 7	7.0	0	Japan, off the east coast of Honshu	( )	15.0	October 12
= 7	7.0	0	Taiwan, east of	( )	15.0	December 17

- Note: At least 7.0 magnitude

== Notable events ==
=== January ===
January
- Strongest: 6.9 M_{w} United States
- Deadliest: 6.4 M_{w} Turkey; 5 deaths
- Total fatalities: 5

Number by magnitude
- 8.0–8.9: 0
- 7.0–7.9: 0
- 6.0–6.9: 6

Date	Country and location	M_{w}	Depth (km)	MMI	Notes	Casualties	
Date	Country and location	M_{w}	Depth (km)	MMI	Notes	Dead	Injured
3	Tibet, Tibet (1912-1951)	6.5	15.0				
4	Turkey, Sea of Marmara	6.4	15.0	X	5 people were killed and some damage was caused. An example of a doublet earthquake as these events struck about 2 hours apart.	5	
4	Turkey, Sea of Marmara	6.3	10.0				
17	France, Loyalty Islands, New Caledonia	6.5	35.0				
22	Dutch East Indies, Papua (province)	6.2	35.0				
23	United States, Fox Islands (Alaska)	6.9	35.0	I			

=== February ===
February
- Strongest: 6.8 M_{w} 2 events
- Deadliest: 6.8 M_{w} Greece; 51+ deaths
- Total fatalities: 51+

Number by magnitude
- 8.0–8.9: 0
- 7.0–7.9: 0
- 6.0–6.9: 10

Date	Country and location	M_{w}	Depth (km)	MMI	Notes	Casualties	
Date	Country and location	M_{w}	Depth (km)	MMI	Notes	Dead	Injured
3	Afghanistan, Badakhshan Province	6.0	230.0				
4	Dutch East Indies, Molucca Sea	6.5	80.0				
7	Philippines, Ragay Gulf	6.0	35.0				
9	Taiwan, Yilan County, Taiwan	6.2	35.0				
13	Chile, Antofagasta Region	6.5	100.0				
19	Japan, off the east coast of Honshu	6.0	35.0				
22	United States, Near Islands, Alaska	6.8	30.0	I			
25	Greece, southern Aegean Sea	6.8	80.0	VIII	At least 51 deaths were caused.	51+	
27	Dutch East Indies, Talaud Islands	6.0	35.0				
28	Chile, Antofagasta Region	6.2	200.0				

=== March ===
March
- Strongest: 6.4 M_{w} British Solomon Islands
- Deadliest: 6.0 M_{w} Iran; 60 deaths
- Total fatalities: 60

Number by magnitude
- 8.0–8.9: 0
- 7.0–7.9: 0
- 6.0–6.9: 9

Date	Country and location	M_{w}	Depth (km)	MMI	Notes	Casualties	
Date	Country and location	M_{w}	Depth (km)	MMI	Notes	Dead	Injured
5	Iran, Mazandaran Province	6.0	35.0		60 deaths were caused.	60	
5	India, Uttarakhand	6.0	35.0				
8	Ecuador, Loja Province	6.0	100.0				
18	Greece, west of Karpathos	6.2	130.0				
20	British Solomon Islands	6.4	20.0				
21	Bangladesh, Rajshahi Division	6.2	80.0				
26	Peru, Arequipa Region	6.0	120.0				
28	China, Jilin Province	6.2	550.0				
30	Japan, off the east coast of Honshu	6.3	35.0				

=== April ===
April
- Strongest: 7.0 M_{w} Taiwan
- Deadliest: 7.0 M_{w} Taiwan; 3,276 deaths
- Total fatalities: 3,968

Number by magnitude
- 8.0–8.9: 0
- 7.0–7.9: 1
- 6.0–6.9: 13

Date	Country and location	M_{w}	Depth (km)	MMI	Notes	Casualties	
Date	Country and location	M_{w}	Depth (km)	MMI	Notes	Dead	Injured
3	Afghanistan, Badakhshan Province	6.2	250.0				
10	Venezuela, Gulf of Paria	6.5	100.0				
11	Iran, Mazandaran Province	6.4	15.0	IX	690 deaths were reported as well as major damage.	690	
15	Japan, Gifu Prefecture, Honshu	6.2	270.0				
19	Italian Libya, Sirte District	6.8	15.0				
19	Italian Libya, Sirte District	6.0	35.0		Aftershock.		
20	Italian Libya, Sirte District	6.5	35.0		Aftershock.		
20	Taiwan, Taichung City	7.0	15.0	VIII	The 1935 Shinchiku-Taichū earthquake was the deadliest earthquake in the country's history. The death toll was 3,276 with another 12,053 injured. 17,907 homes were destroyed.	3,276	12,053
20	Taiwan, off the west coast	6.0	35.0		Aftershock.		
21	Dutch East Indies, Java Sea	6.0	35.0				
23	British Burma, Sagaing Region	6.2	110.0				
24	Maldives	6.0	35.0				
24	Mexico, off the coast of Chiapas	6.2	50.0				
28	China, Sichuan Province	6.0	0.0	VIII	2 people were killed and a few homes were destroyed. Depth unknown.	2	

=== May ===
May
- Strongest: 7.5 M_{w} Pakistan
- Deadliest: 7.5 M_{w} Pakistan; 60,000 deaths
- Total fatalities: 60,540

Number by magnitude
- 8.0–8.9: 0
- 7.0–7.9: 1
- 6.0–6.9: 13

Date	Country and location	M_{w}	Depth (km)	MMI	Notes	Casualties	
Date	Country and location	M_{w}	Depth (km)	MMI	Notes	Dead	Injured
1	Turkey, Agri Province	6.0	35.0		540 deaths were reported in the 1935 Digor earthquake.	540	
4	Taiwan, Taichung City	6.0	35.0		37 people were injured and 28 homes were destroyed.		37
7	Philippines, south of Mindanao	6.0	50.0				
13	Laos, Sainyabuli Province	6.3	35.0				
15	Pakistan, Sindh	6.0	35.0				
20	Dutch East Indies, Talaud Islands	6.0	35.0				
21	Tibet, Tibet (1912-1951)	6.2	140.0				
21	New Guinea, Madang Province	6.2	35.0				
21	New Guinea, Madang Province	6.0	140.0				
24	Philippines, Samar	6.7	45.0				
25	Philippines, east of Samar	6.2	35.0		Aftershock.		
26	Philippines, east of Samar	6.2	35.0		Aftershock.		
30	Pakistan, Baluchistan, Pakistan	7.5	25.0	X	The 1935 Quetta earthquake was one of the worst in Pakistani history. 60,000 people were killed. Major property damage was caused particularly at Quetta. Costs were $25 million (1935 rate).	60,000	
31	Sea of Japan	6.5	450.0		Aftershock.		

=== June ===
June
- Strongest: 7.1 M_{w} New Hebrides
- Total fatalities: 0

Number by magnitude
- 8.0–8.9: 0
- 7.0–7.9: 1
- 6.0–6.9: 9
- 5.0–5.9: 1

Date	Country and location	M_{w}	Depth (km)	MMI	Notes	Casualties	
Date	Country and location	M_{w}	Depth (km)	MMI	Notes	Dead	Injured
1	Philippines, Mindanao	6.0	100.0				
2	Pakistan, Baluchistan, Pakistan	6.0	35.0		Aftershock.		
7	Taiwan, Taichung City	5.8	0.0		5 people were injured and 15 homes were destroyed.		5
16	New Guinea, east of mainland	6.0	35.0				
18	Philippines, east of Samar	6.2	35.0		Aftershock.		
22	Dutch East Indies, south of Sulawesi	6.2	35.0				
24	New Hebrides	7.1	185.0				
25	Russian SFSR, Kuril Islands	6.2	35.0				
28	Chile, off the coast of O'Higgins Region	6.0	35.0				
28	Japan, Izu Islands	6.2	100.0				
29	Mexico, off the coast of Michoacan	6.8	25.0				

=== July ===
July
- Strongest: 7.2 M_{w} Fiji
- Deadliest: 6.5 M_{w} Taiwan; 2,746 deaths
- Total fatalities: 2,755

Number by magnitude
- 8.0–8.9: 0
- 7.0–7.9: 1
- 6.0–6.9: 9

Date	Country and location	M_{w}	Depth (km)	MMI	Notes	Casualties	
Date	Country and location	M_{w}	Depth (km)	MMI	Notes	Dead	Injured
5	Uzbek SSR, Surxondaryo Province	6.2	15.0				
11	Japan, Shizuoka Prefecture, Honshu	6.3	10.0		9 people were killed and some damage was caused.	9	
11	Dutch East Indies, Java Sea	6.0	620.0				
15	Fiji	6.5	580.0				
16	Taiwan, Miaoli County	6.5	30.0		2,746 people were killed and 6,004 were injured. 30,000 homes collapsed.	2,746	6,004
19	Japan, off the east coast of Honshu	6.7	10.0				
26	China, Qinghai Province	6.2	15.0				
28	Afghanistan, Badakhshan Province	6.0	150.0				
29	Fiji	7.2	450.0				
30	Dutch East Indies, north of Sumba	6.2	60.0				

=== August ===
August
- Strongest: 7.2 M_{w} 2 events
- Deadliest: 0.0 M_{w} Colombia; 8 deaths
- Total fatalities: 8

Number by magnitude
- 8.0–8.9: 0
- 7.0–7.9: 2
- 6.0–6.9: 2

Date	Country and location	M_{w}	Depth (km)	MMI	Notes	Casualties	
Date	Country and location	M_{w}	Depth (km)	MMI	Notes	Dead	Injured
3	Dutch East Indies, northern Sumatra	7.2	25.0				
5	Chile, Maule Region	6.0	35.0				
7	Colombia, Narino Department	0.0	95.0	VII	8 people were killed and major damage was caused. The magnitude was unknown.	8	
17	France, Loyalty Islands, New Caledonia	7.2	20.0				
23	Dutch East Indies, off the west coast of southern Sumatra	6.5	25.0				

=== September ===
September
- Strongest: 7.8 M_{w} New Guinea
- Total fatalities: 0

Number by magnitude
- 8.0–8.9: 0
- 7.0–7.9: 4
- 6.0–6.9: 6

Date	Country and location	M_{w}	Depth (km)	MMI	Notes	Casualties	
Date	Country and location	M_{w}	Depth (km)	MMI	Notes	Dead	Injured
4	United States, central Alaska	6.3	0.0	III			
4	Taiwan, off the southeast coast	7.0	15.0		This event came only 10 minutes after the Alaska event.		
9	Palau	6.8	15.0				
11	Russian SFSR, Kuril Islands	7.2	35.0				
18	Colombia, Risaralda Department	6.2	80.0				
19	Peru, Puno Region	6.5	250.0				
20	New Guinea, Sandaun Province	7.8	30.0				
20	New Guinea, West Sepik Province	7.0	35.0		Aftershock.		
23	New Guinea, Sandaun Province	6.7	35.0		Aftershock.		
25	New Guinea, off the north coast	6.3	35.0				

=== October ===
October
- Strongest: 7.1 M_{w} Japan
- Deadliest: 2 events caused 2 deaths
- Total fatalities: 4

Number by magnitude
- 8.0–8.9: 0
- 7.0–7.9: 2
- 6.0–6.9: 8

Date	Country and location	M_{w}	Depth (km)	MMI	Notes	Casualties	
Date	Country and location	M_{w}	Depth (km)	MMI	Notes	Dead	Injured
2	Russian SFSR, Kuril Islands	6.4	35.0				
4	Philippines, southern Mindanao	6.5	500.0				
8	Tajik SSR, Districts of Republican Subordination	6.3	20.0				
11	New Guinea, off the north coast	6.6	15.0				
12	Japan, off the east coast of Honshu	7.0	15.0		Doublet earthquake		
18	Japan, off the east coast of Honshu	7.1	15.0				
18	United States, Northern Mariana Islands	6.7	20.0				
18	Japan, off the east coast of Honshu	6.4	15.0		Aftershock.		
19	United States, Helena, Montana	6.3	0.0	VIII	The 1935 Helena earthquake was a series of events that struck the area this month. This was the largest of the shocks. 2 people were killed and at least 101 were injured. Major damage was caused with 300 homes collapsing. Property damage costs were around $19 million (1935 rate). Depth unknown.	2	101+
31	United States, Helena, Montana	6.0	0.0	VIII	This major aftershock caused a further 2 deaths and more property damage. Costs were $6 million (1935 rate). Depth unknown.	2	

=== November ===
November
- Strongest: 6.7 M_{w} Vietnam
- Total fatalities: 0

Number by magnitude
- 8.0–8.9: 0
- 7.0–7.9: 0
- 6.0–6.9: 6
- 5.0–5.9: 1

Date	Country and location	M_{w}	Depth (km)	MMI	Notes	Casualties	
Date	Country and location	M_{w}	Depth (km)	MMI	Notes	Dead	Injured
1	Canada, eastern Ontario	5.6	1.0	VII	1935 Timiskaming earthquake.		
1	Vietnam, Dien Bien Province	6.7	15.0				
2	Ecuador, Chimborazo Province	6.0	130.0				
10	United Kingdom, southwest of Montserrat	6.2	100.0				
14	New Guinea, East New Britain Province	6.5	35.0				
25	Dutch East Indies, off the west coast of northern Sumatra	6.5	35.0				
30	Panama, north of	6.4	35.0				

=== December ===
December
- Strongest: 7.6 M_{w} 2 events
- Deadliest: 6.0 M_{w} China; 100 deaths
- Total fatalities: 100

Number by magnitude
- 8.0–8.9: 0
- 7.0–7.9: 4
- 6.0–6.9: 10

Date	Country and location	M_{w}	Depth (km)	MMI	Notes	Casualties	
Date	Country and location	M_{w}	Depth (km)	MMI	Notes	Dead	Injured
1	Japan, Ryukyu Islands	6.4	20.0				
2	Japan, Ryukyu Islands	6.2	20.0		Aftershock.		
5	Fiji	6.5	35.0				
14	Brazil, Acre (state)	6.7	610.0				
14	United States, Northern Mariana Islands	6.5	270.0				
14	Mexico, Chiapas	7.3	35.0		Major damage was reported.		
15	British Solomon Islands, western Makira	7.6	35.0				
16	Brazil, Acre (state)	6.2	650.0				
17	Taiwan, east of	7.0	15.0				
18	China, Sichuan Province	6.0	35.0	VIII	100 people were killed and many homes were destroyed.	100	
20	British Solomon Islands	6.3	15.0				
24	Colombia, off the west coast of	6.2	25.0				
28	Dutch East Indies, Batu Islands	7.6	30.0	VIII	The 1935 Sumatra earthquake caused at least 1 injury and some homes to collapse.		1+
29	Dutch East Indies, Seram	6.4	25.0				
