= Tekor Church =

Church building in Kars Province, Turkey

Church of Saint Sarkis, Tekor
- Տեկորի տաճար
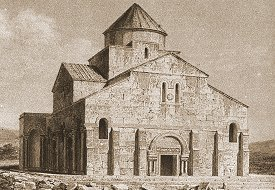
- Tekor Basilica in an engraving from the 1840s

- Location within Turkey

Religion
- Affiliation: Armenian Apostolic Church
- Status: completely destroyed by local Turkish municipality

Location
- Location: Digor, Turkey
- Coordinates: 40.371389°N 43.414722°E

Architecture
- Style: Armenian
- Groundbreaking: 5th century
- Completed: 10th century

The Church of Saint Sarkis (Sargis) in Tekor, also known as the Tekor Basilica (Armenian: Տեկորի տաճար) was a late 5th century Armenian church built in historical Armenia. It was located facing the town of Digor in the Kars Province of Turkey, about 16 kilometers west of the Armenian border. Tekor was a three aisled basilica with a dome. It was severely damaged by earthquakes in 1912 and 1936, and later damaged by vandalism. Now only the lower parts of the rubble and concrete core of the walls remain, the facing stone apparently removed to build the town hall (now itself demolished) in the 1960s. The inscription dating the building to the 480s was the oldest known writing in the Armenian language.

== Location ==
The village of Tekor (Digor) had a population of 360 in 1886, with Armenians making up 70% and Kurds 25%. Over 500 Armenians lived in the village by 1913. At the time it was part of the Kagizman okrug of the Kars Oblast of the Russian Empire. The Armenian presence came to a permanent end during the Turkish–Armenian War of 1920.

== Architectural significance ==
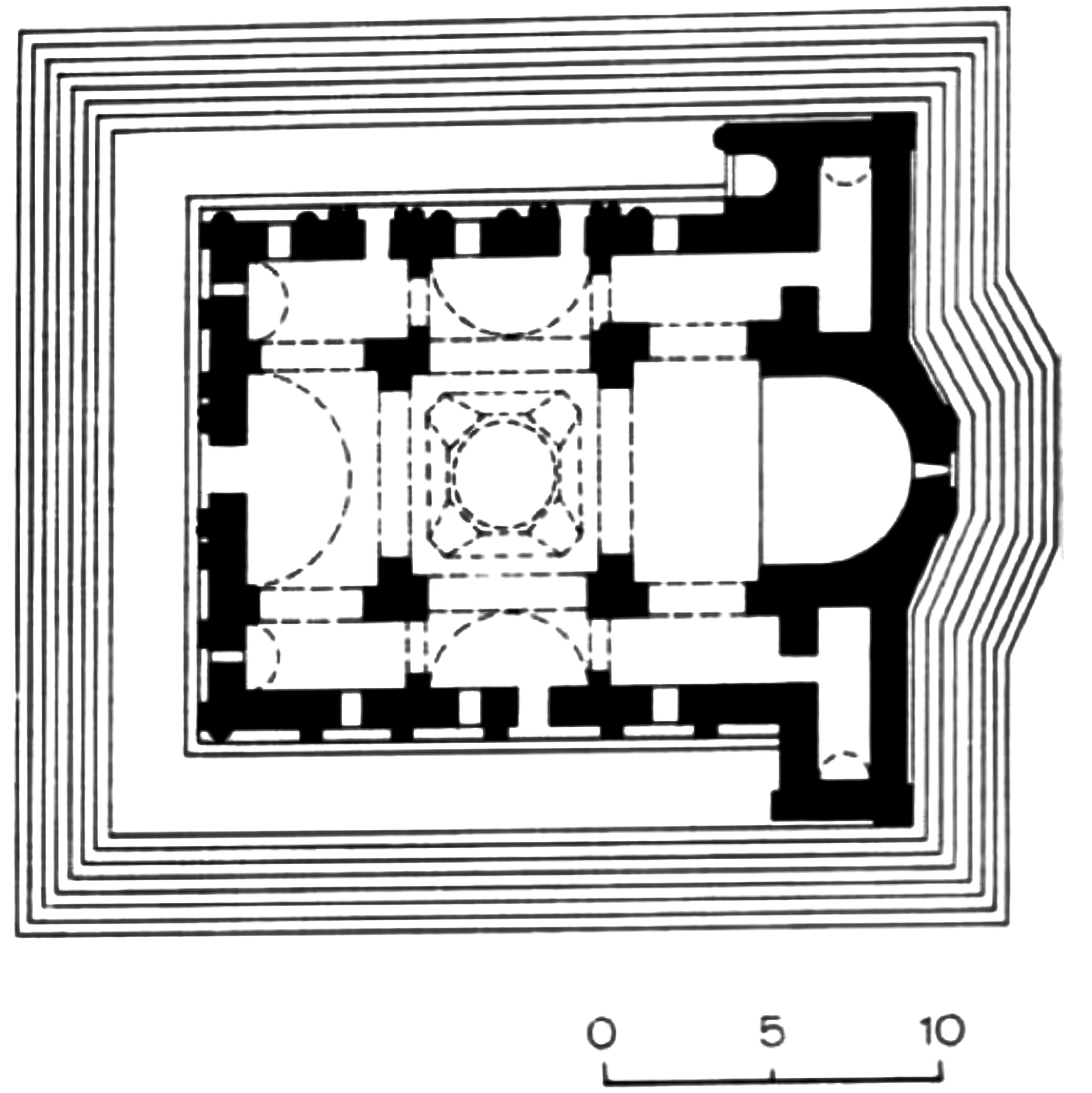
Plan of Tekor Basilica

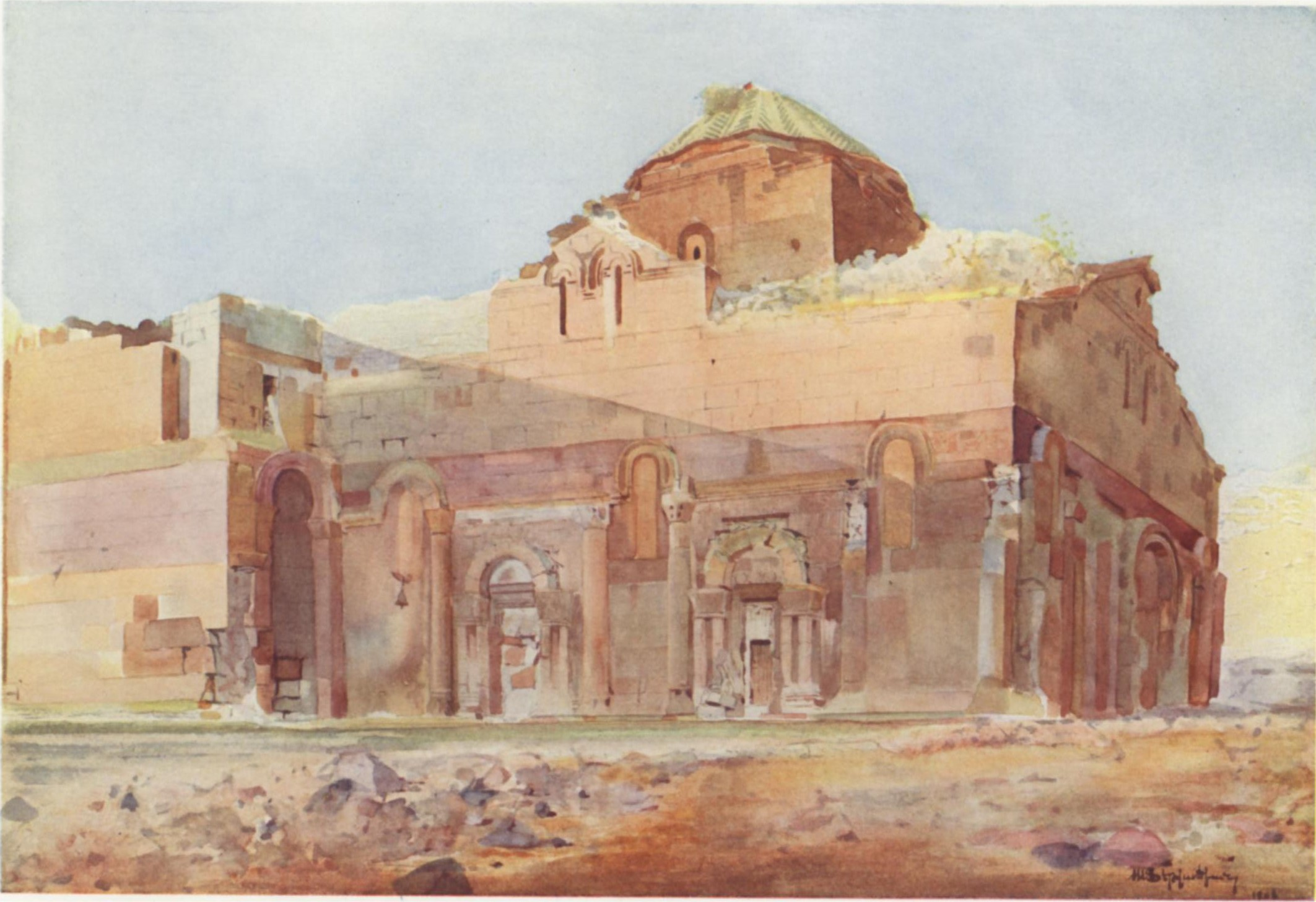
A watercolor by Arshak Fetvadjian from the early 20th century

The Basilica of Saint Sarkis is significant in Armenian architectural history because its stone dome was among the earliest to be constructed in Armenia. Until its destruction, Tekor was the oldest extant domed church in Armenia.

== Hellenistic and Syrian influences ==
Armenian church architecture of this era has Hellenistic and Syrian influences. Some churches like Tekor and Arucha show pediments of Syrian type and some churches like the palace church at Ani show distinct Syrian features in their layout and construction while Odzun retain Hellenistic features. The plan of the church at Bagaran is an example of Syrian influence. In Syria the plan occurs in the second century AD in the building known as the Praetorium of Mismiyah, later converted to a Byzantine church. The whole style of the Praetorium is akin to the characteristic of Syrian building, which influenced early Armenian church architecture.

The Yererouk Church, Avan Cathedral, Zvartnots Cathedral, and the Mastara Church contain Greek inscriptions as well, the Zvartnots Cathedral and the Aruch Cathedral also contain Arabic inscriptions of the second-half of the 8th century.

Armenian historians dispute the Syrian influences of Armenian church architecture.

== Armenian inscription in Tekor (478–490) ==
"Sahak Kamsarakan built this martyrium of Saint Sargis for his intercession and of his whole family and wife and children and loved ones and [–]

And this site was founded by means of Yohan of the office of katʿołikos of Armenia and Yohan bishop of Arsharunik and Tayron elder of the community of Tekor and Manan hazarapet of Uran Horom [–]"

== Destruction and current state ==
Photos of Tekor by Garegin Hovsepian

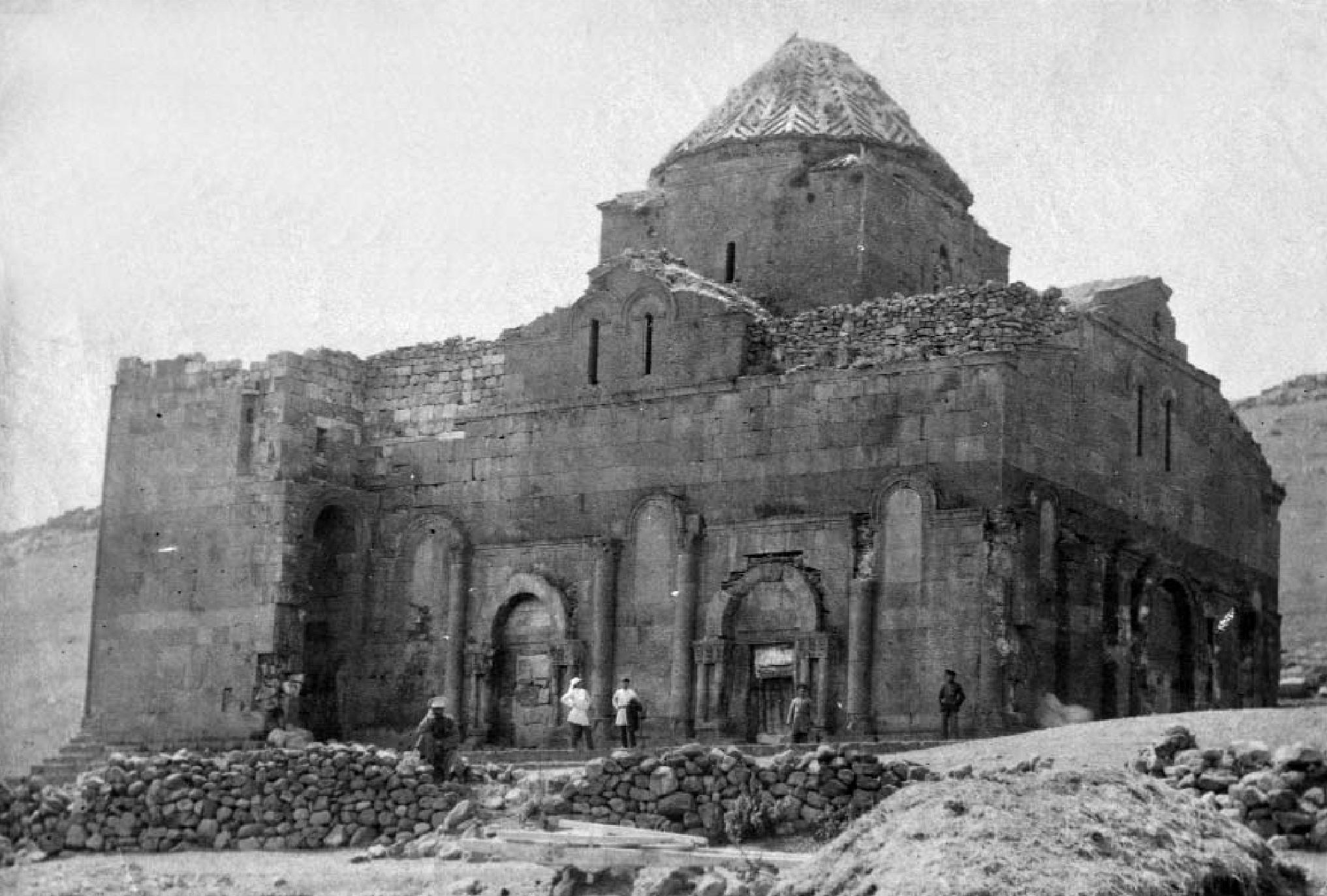
from the northwest before the 1912 earthquake

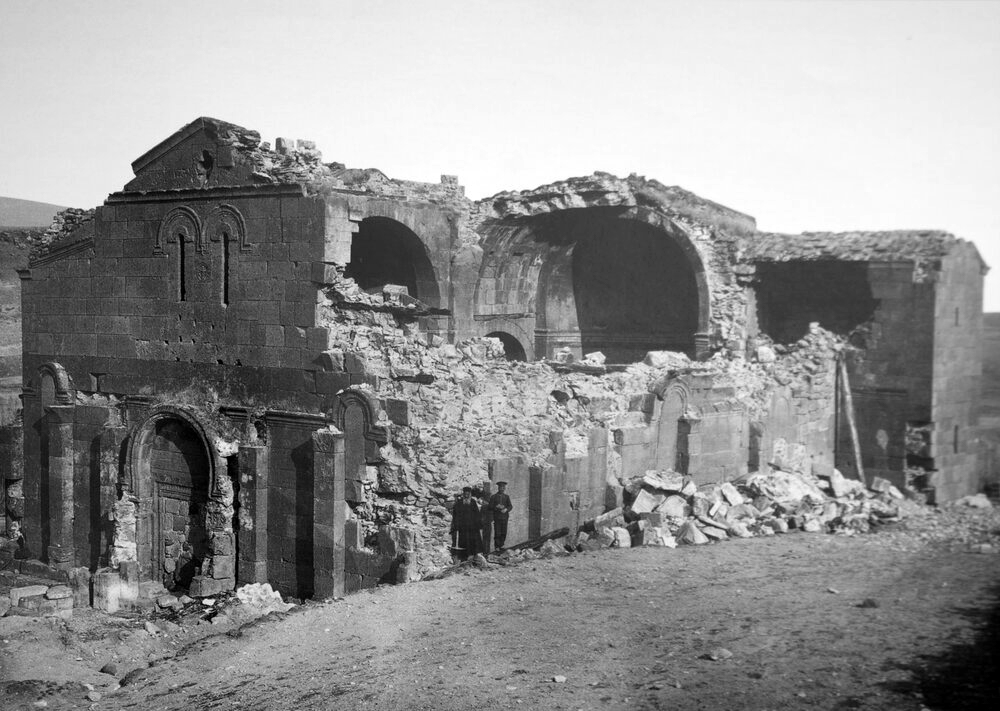
from the southwest after the 1912 earthquake

The church survived largely intact until the early 20th century. It was abandoned in 1906. It suffered significant damage in an earthquake on August 1, 1912, (Note: The date is erroneously given as 1911 in some sources, while some sources erroneously state that the collapse was due to a lightning strike.) when its dome, most of the roof, and much of the southern façade collapsed. Dickran Kouymjian wrote that even in ruins, Tekor was "still massive and impressive." In August 1920, just before the Turkish–Armenian War, Ashkharbek Kalantar led the last Armenian expedition to Tekor and documented its state. He wrote that the collapsed church "presents a pitiful picture" and that the "image is so disturbing that at first one needs some time to recover from the shock."

The church was further damaged by an earthquake on May 1, 1935 (Note: The date is erroneously given as 1936 in some sources.) and was deliberately targeted by the Turkish military during artillery exercises in 1956. The facing stones of what remained of the church were removed by the 1960s. Nicole and Jean-Michel Thierry, who visited in 1964, reported that the church was "almost entirely leveled" and it had lost all its facing stones. An American couple photographed the ruins in 1966, showing its walls entirely stripped of facing stones.

In 1964 the Thierrys did not notice "traces of reuse in modern houses" during their self-described "superficial" field work, but according to Murad Hasratyan and Samvel Karapetyan, under Turkish control, its stones were gradually removed by local peasants and used as construction material. (Note: "The monument itself was almost entirely destroyed after 1920, its revetment stones being appropriated as building material.") Hasratyan noted that its polished and sculpted stones can be found in the walls of local houses and barns. (Note: «...հուշարձանից այսօր մնացել են պատերի կրաբետոնի միջուկի մի քանի կույտեր, իսկ սրբատաշ, վաղմիջնադարյան արվեստի բացառիկ քանդակներով քարերը կարելի է տեսնել մոտակա թուրքա-քրդաբնակ գյուղի տների և գոմերի պատերի շարվածքում:») Steven Sim who visited in the 1980s, reported that according to locals, its facing stones were used in the 1960s for the construction of the Digor town hall, which was itself was demolished in the 1970s. According to Kouymjian, upon his visit in 1999, "there were only fragments, chunks of masonry walls" remaining. Sim argues that its present state is "mostly the work of man rather than earthquakes."

According to art historian Karen Matevosyan, who visited in 2013, the ruins form part of a local Kurdish man's house. A Turkish researcher wrote in 2020 that villagers store poultry and other belongings in the church's remnants. An Armenian art historian, who visited in 2022 noted that the site is filled with litter.

A Turkish survey in 2014 noted that the church has "reached our time in a dilapidated state, with some of its eastern and northern walls standing without facing stones". The survey drew its plan and section sketches, took measurements and photographs. In October 2019, the Kars Regional Cultural Heritage Preservation Board (under the Turkish Ministry of Culture and Tourism) decided to register the church as an immovable cultural property. It noted that the property is "currently in an unprotected state and is in quite a neglected condition." It indicated that only parts of the apse section and the northern body walls have survived.

== Gallery ==
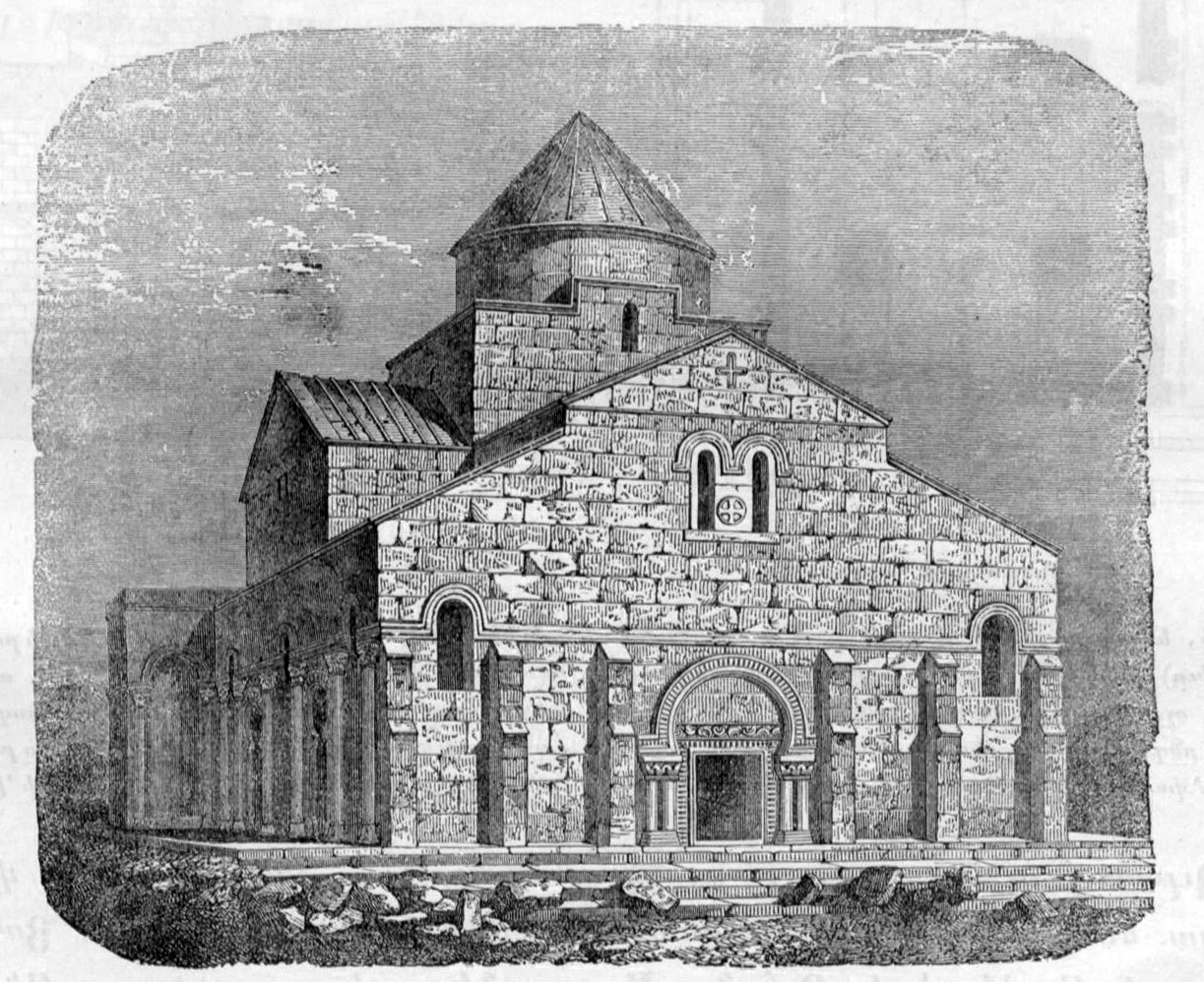
Picture of Tekor Basilica in 1881

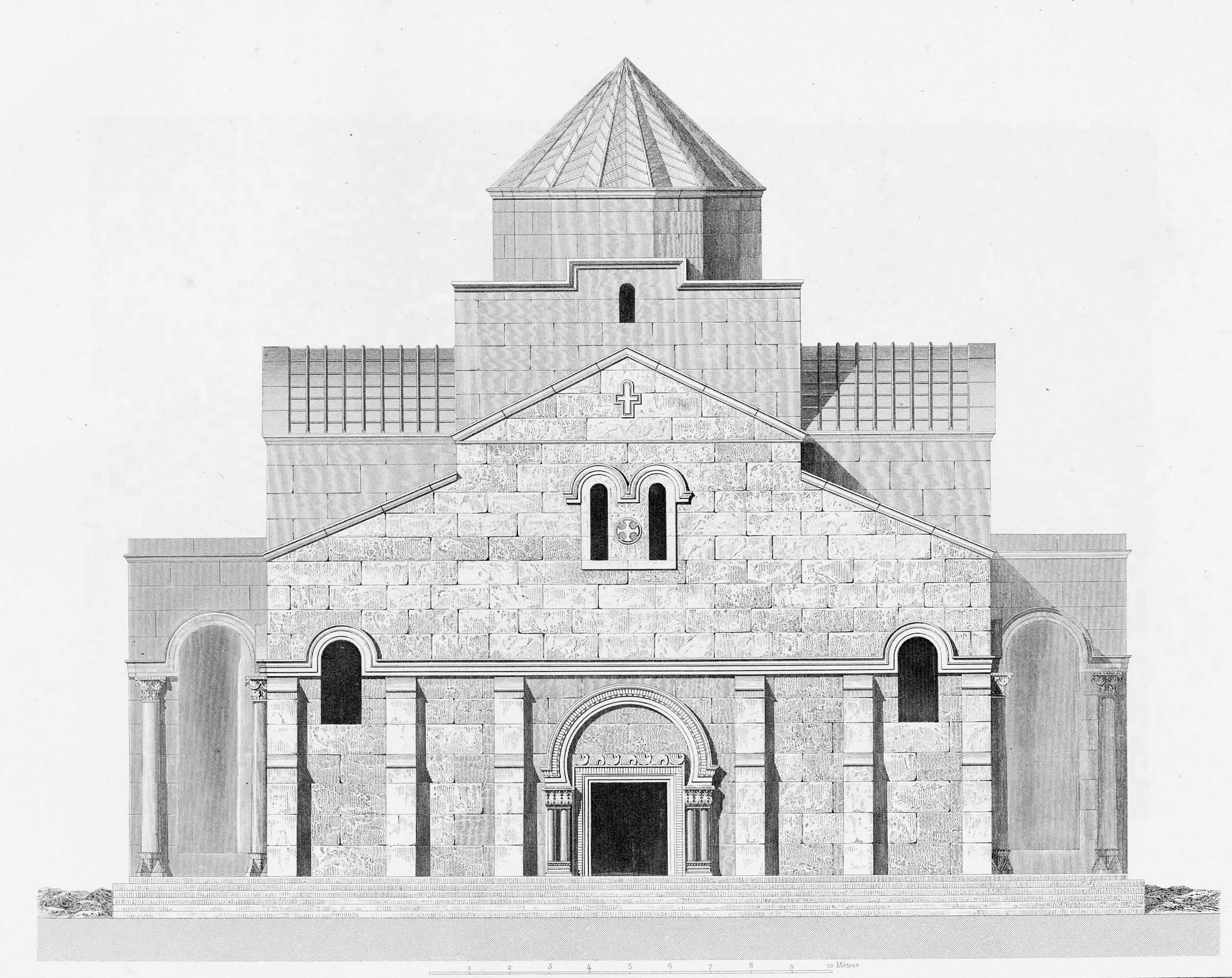
front view

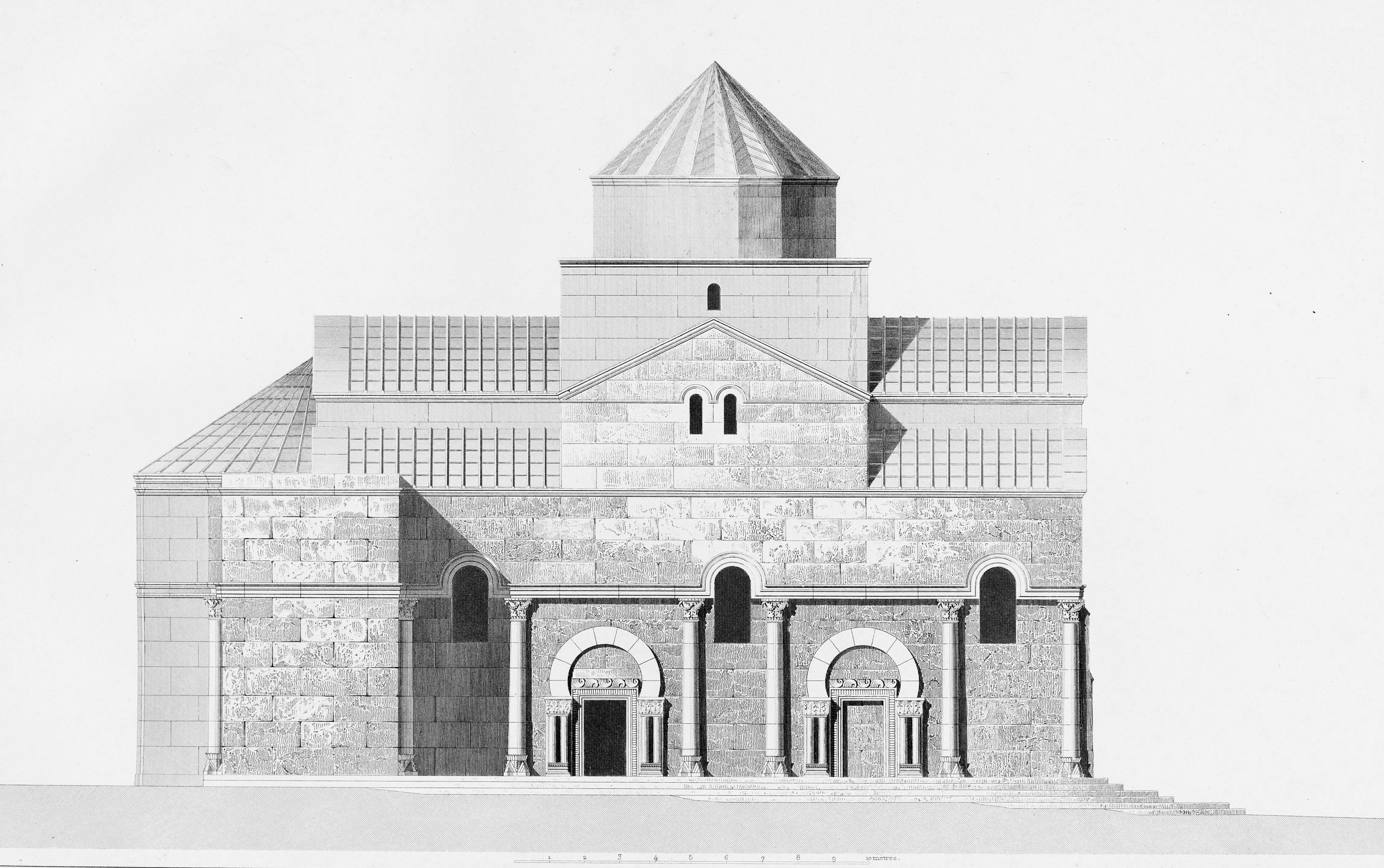
side view

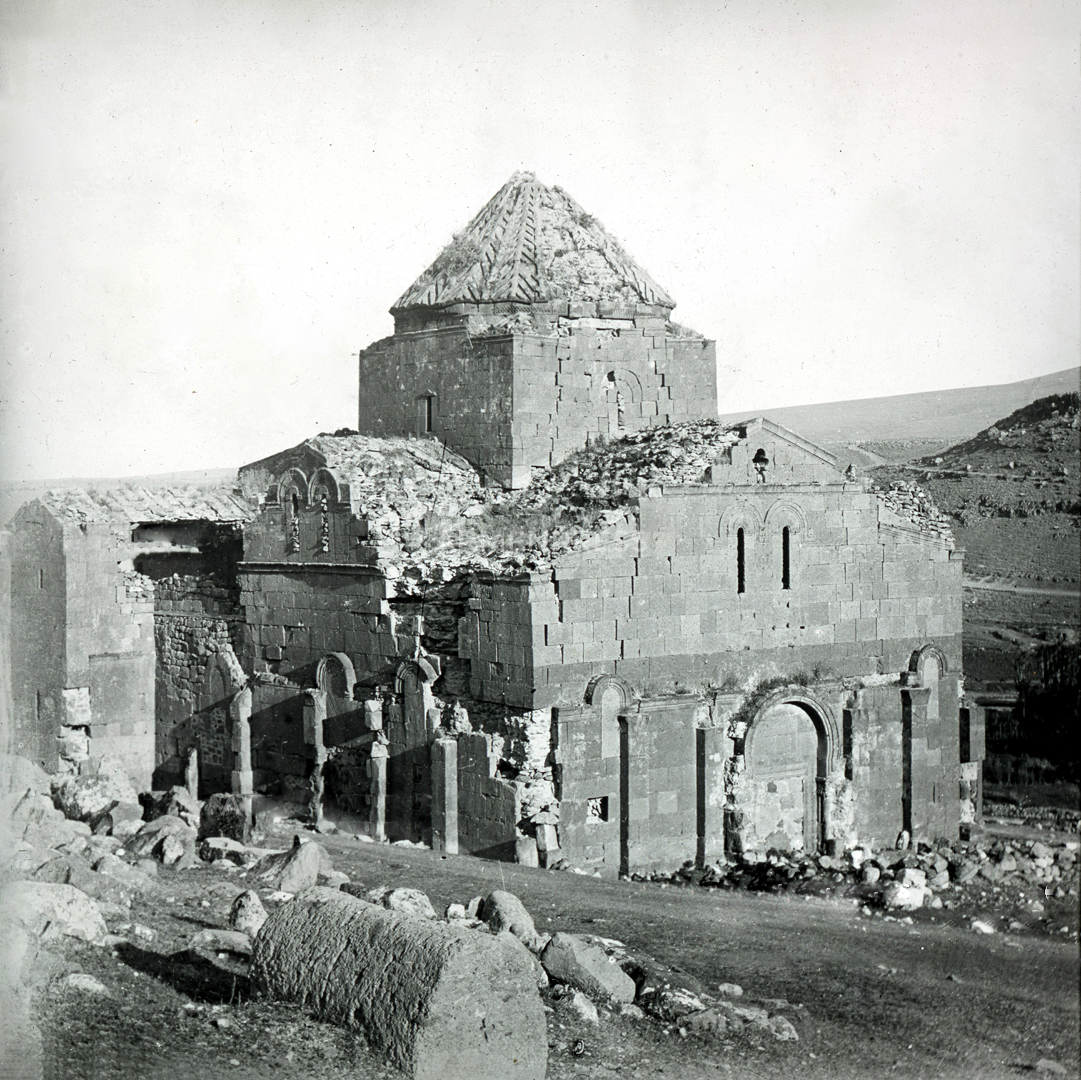
Photo by Aram Vruyr before the 1912 earthquake

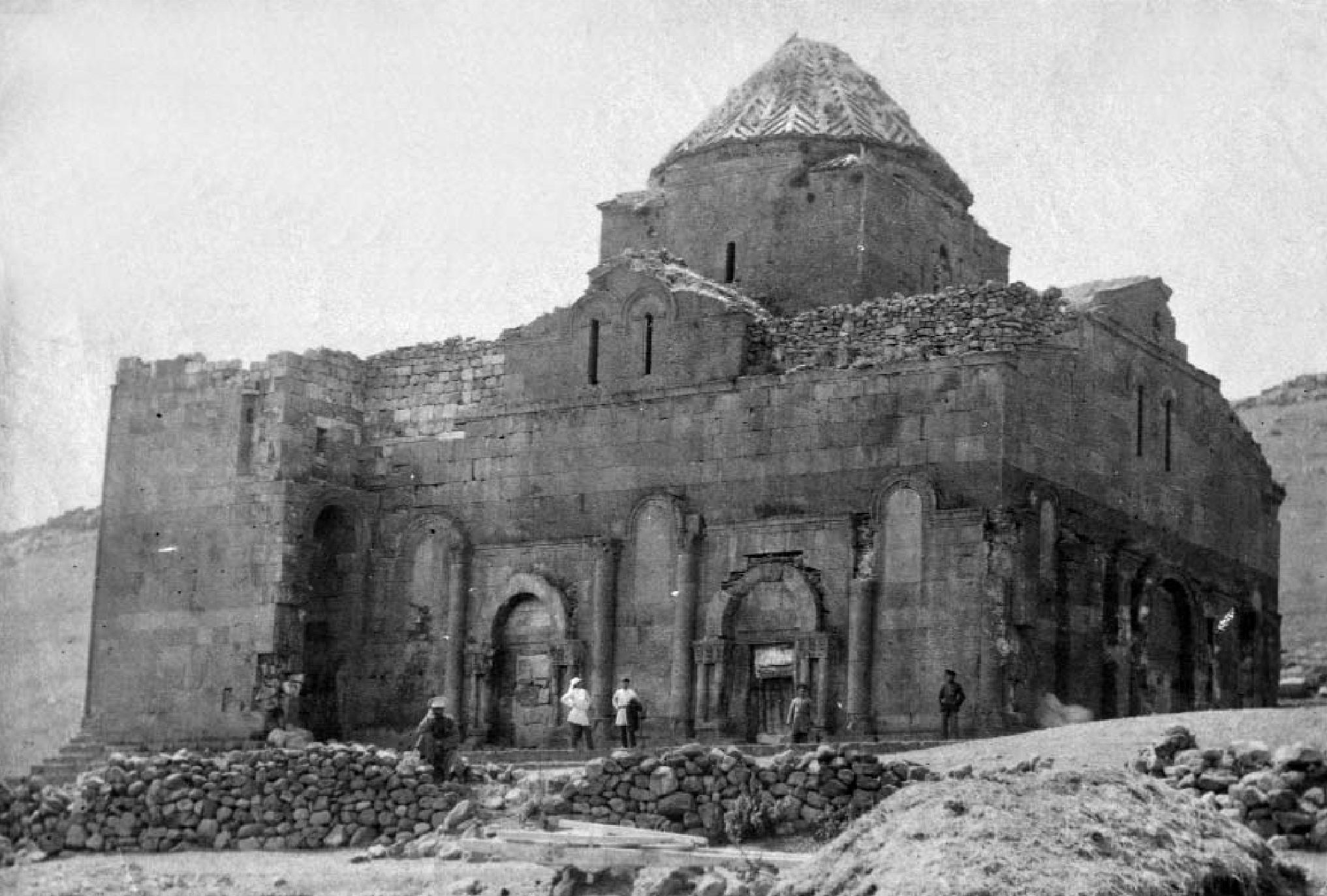
from the northwest before the 1912 earthquake

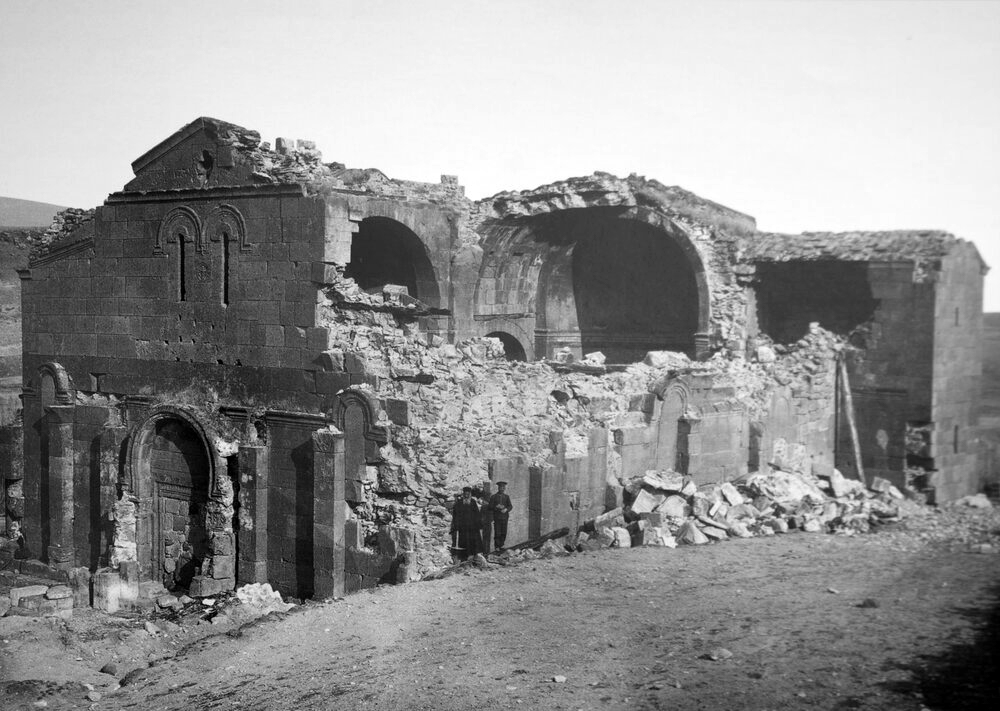
from the southwest after the 1912 earthquake

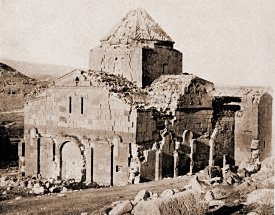
Tekor Basilica before earthquake in 1912

== See also ==
- Yererouk, a contemporaneous 5th–6th century Armenian basilica about 18 kilometres northwest of Digor, in Armenia.

== Bibliography ==
- Armen, Garbis (1992), An Architecture of Survival, ISBN 0-9695988-0-7
- Տեկորի տաճարը, Թորոս Թօրամանեան, Թիֆլիս, 1911։
- Şeker, Burçin Şenol; Özkaynak, Merve (2022). "Seismic Performance Evaluation of Historical Case Study of Armenian Architecture Tekor Church". Civil and Environmental Engineering Reports. 32 (2). Poland: the Institute of Environmental Engineering and the Institute of Civil Engineering at the University of Zielona Góra: 36–52. doi:10.2478/ceer-2022-0018.
