= 1935 Digor earthquake =

Earthquake in Turkey

- Location within Turkey
- UTC time: 1935-05-01 10:24:44
- ISC event: 904257
- USGS-ANSS: ComCat
- Local date: 1 May 1935
- Local time: 12:24
- Magnitude: 6.1 M_{w}
- Depth: 10 km (6.2 mi)
- Epicenter: 40.57°N 43.42°E
- Areas affected: Turkey
- Max. intensity: MMI VIII (Severe)
- Casualties: 540 deaths

The 1935 Digor earthquake occurred on 1 May at Digor, Kars in the Eastern Anatolia region of Turkey. It had a moment magnitude of 6.1 and caused 540 fatalities.

== See also ==
- List of earthquakes in 1935
- List of earthquakes in Turkey
