= Stone sculptures of horses and sheep in the Caucasian States =

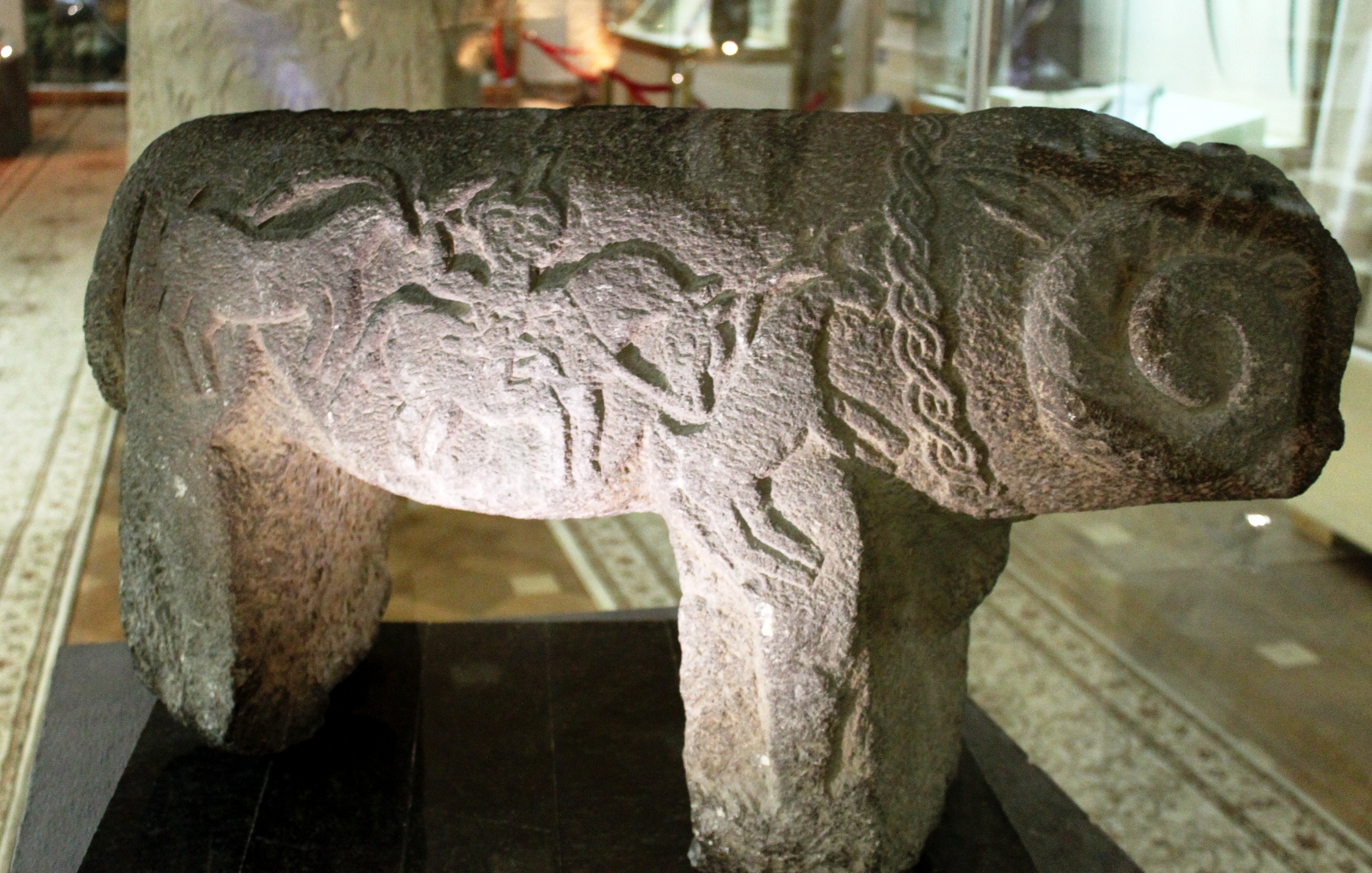
Stone sculpture of sheep from Nakchivan, related to the 16th century. Is kept in Azerbaijan State Museum of History

Stone sculptures of horses and sheep – are zoomorphic headstones, spread in the South Caucasus, Eastern Turkey and Iranian Azerbaijan, the main part of which is dated back to the 13th-19th centuries.

Most of the animal sculptures reach considerable sizes. Some of them stand on pedestal. Sculptures made with great artistic mastery and expression are also met with besides schematically and roughly intagliated sheep and horse figures. Backs and sides of horses and sheep are covered with relief pictures of everyday life scenes, besides inscriptions. Inscriptions carved with Arabic script are also frequently found on headstones.

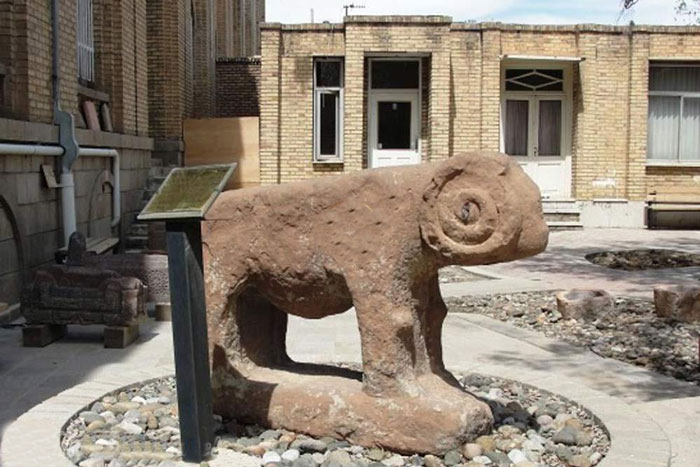
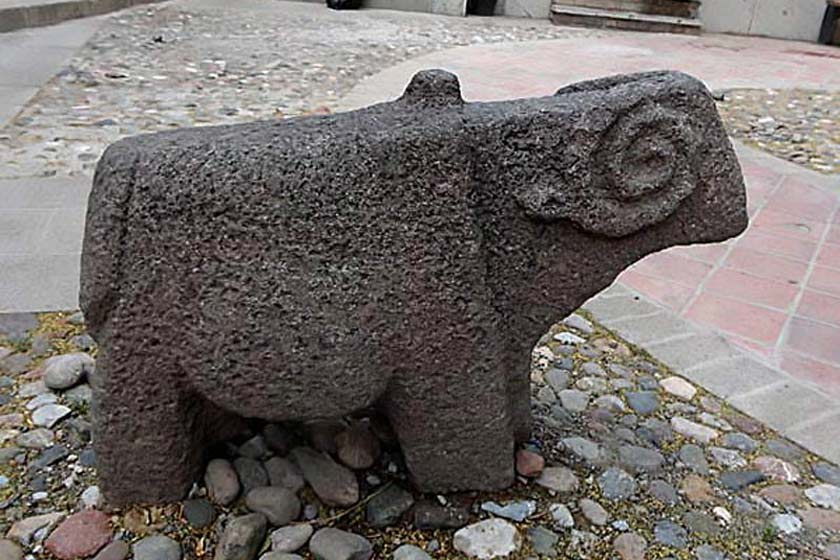
Ram statues, kept in Azerbaijan Museum in Tabriz, Iranian Azerbaijan.

== History of appearance and learning ==
Pictures of alive beings in every form were restricted after occupation of the region by Arabs in the 8th century. National creativity of countries occupied by Arabs was gradually avoided restrictions of Sharia beginning from the second half of the 9th century, when reign of Arabs was strongly shaken and weakened by the Khurramites movement and fight of local feudals against the Caliphate. Pictures of alive beings appeared in national arts again. It is considered that headstones were made in forms of sheep and horses beginning from the 15th century. These headstones are considered as an example of restriction of Islamic dogmatics. Horses were always carved in overridden forms and in harness. Besides inscriptions armours of deceased person sculptures – bow, arrows, sword, shield, quiver and others were also portrayed on.

Pictures of wild goats, deer, in some cases hunting scenes for these animals and sometimes everyday life episodes were also carved on stone sheep, besides the inscriptions.

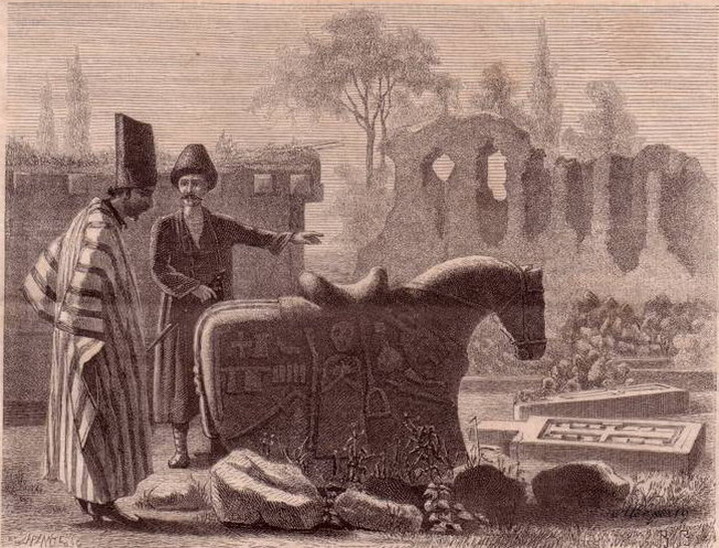
Stone sculpture of a horse in Shusha in Vasily Vereshchagin's picture,1865

Firstly, a French geologist Frederic Dubois de Montpereux (1798 – 1850) mentioned about similar sculpture in “Voyage autour du Caucase”. There are materials in “Historie de la Societe nationale des l’antiquite” work of Perrot et Chipiez (Volume V, page 170). Then it was mentioned in works of German archeologist Arthur Milchhöfer “Archeologische Zeitung” of 1883, in “Bulletin de la Société nationale des antiquaires de France” in 1899 (balance of Turkish cemetery in Yerevan city) – “Report of Archeological Commission for 1898”. Letters in the southern semitic alphabet carved on sculpture of horse, found out near Dikh village of Kurdistan region, were opened by E.Y.Resler. A horse sculpture from Tselkinskiy district of Tiflis Governorate was also mentioned (I.P.Rostomov, Akhalkalaki uyezd in archeological relations).

In the 1920s, V.M.Sysoyev registered stone sculptures of horses and sheep in following points of Absheron peninsula, on Muslim cemetery in Zikh village, in Kuturlu village of Kurdistan uyezd, in Muslim cemetery of Qarağac village of Nagorno-Karabakh Autonomous Republic, in Aznaburt, Azi (lower part), Vanand, Danagird (in Armenian cemetery) of Nakhchivan’s border, in Nakhchivan (city), Ananab village, in Armenian church in Erzincan, in Abidere, Balaburm Garidy, Lerik, Tangarud, Eychara villages of Lankaran uyezd, during the working process on archeological map of Azerbaijan. Sysoyev also noted that, local residents of Ordubad, Danagirt and Abrakunis find out these figures in ancient cemeteries, in mountains and other places, attach importance to them, frequently bring them from there and put on graves of their dears. An exemplar of stone sheep was also in park “in the square”, in Borjomi, which was brought from outskirts. In 1925, this sheep was vanished and taken away by the Kura River, during flood of the river. Artistically created figure of sheep was in Barda village near Yevlakh. Fate of that sheep, a photo of which is kept in archive of the Azerbaijan State Museum of History, is unknown at present.

In 1926, monuments in Urud village of Zangezur district were found out by archeologist A.K.Alakbarov, about which he briefly wrote the following sentences: “There are many sepulchral monuments with pictures of people and inscriptions on sides” in an ancient cemetery of Urud village.

Y, Pchelina notes that (1932), such kind of monuments are popular in literature about the South Caucasus and usually are ascribed to Armenians and Turks. She emphasizes headstones as “very rough sculptures” of sheep and horses made of gray stone in a cemetery near Yanig Yugoruk sanctuary (between Kizilav and Seyidlar villages on the Hakari river) and also in cemeteries of Shalva, Minkend, Gara-Gishlag villages. Pchelina describes these sculptures also:

Animals stand in a silent waiting pose. Sheep were carved especially roughly. These are almost stone bars, standing on two pedestals. Sometimes only head with hardly carved horns, which do not go beyond the flatness of temple, is carved by incisor. Lines of back and croup are given clearly. But legs are only drown and are not apart from the body, looking like a whole stone.

According to Azerbaijani historian M.C.Neymatova, headstones in shape of stone sculptures of sheep and known as “goch dash”, appeared in connection with sheep husbandry. Besides this, she assumes that appearance of headstones in shape of horse sculptures should be explained as the horses which were the only transportation in mountains, were sacred.

== Spread ==
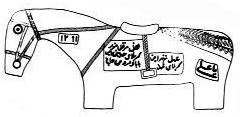
Drawings on the gravestone in form of stone sculpture of horse from Kalbajar rayon

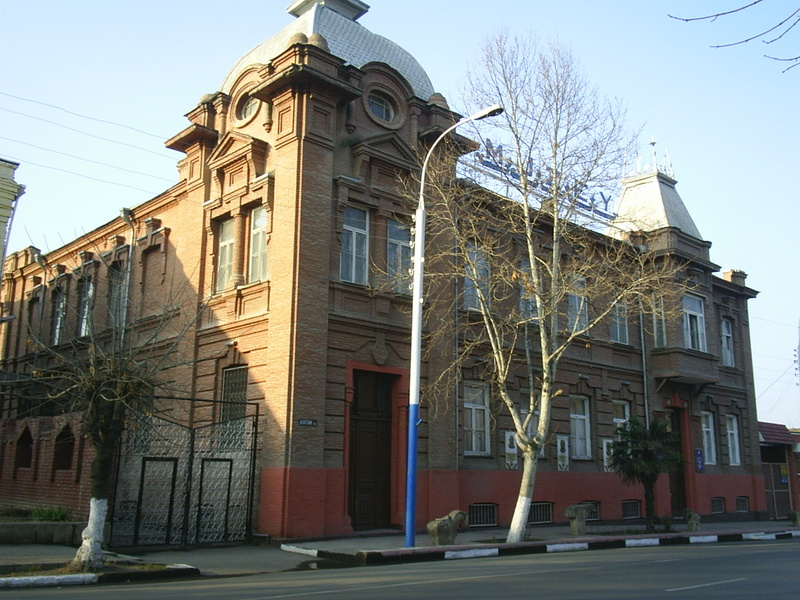
Stone sculptures of horse and sheep in front of the building of Archeological Museum in Ganja

The stone sculptures of horses and sheep are met in Muslim cemeteries in the territory of Azerbaijan in a number of villages of Nakhchivan’s borders, Nagorno-Karabakh, Lankaran, Mil valley, up to Absheron peninsula and respected by population of outskirts and are associated with new beliefs and traditions. Such kind of headstones are especially spread in Muslim cemeteries of Zikh (Absheron), in Nagorno Karabakh near Qarağac village, in a number of villages of Nakhchivan AR, in district of Ordubad (city), in district Lankaran, in Mil valley, in an ancient Muslim cemetery called “Peygambar” (prophet), near ruins of Baylagan, in Kurdistan and in others. Analogical figures of stone sheep, which have such cultic assignment, are met also in Iran (Khoy, Maragheh). It is considered that similar forms of these works of art could be appeared in different places as a reflection of identical conditions of development.

97 headstones in shape of stone sculptures of sheep and horses in 5th territory of Nakhchivan AR, are in a list of monuments of national stone sculpture, registered by the Ministry of Culture of the Azerbaijan SSR, in 1985. There are 47 sculptures in a museum under the open air of Nakhchivan city, 5 sculptures in Ordubad district (in Aza, Vanand, Valavar, Der), 25 sculptures in Shahbuz District (in Badamlı, Hajazur, Mahmudoba, Arinj, Kolanly, Kuku, between Bichenek village and summer pasture Batabat, in Kecheldag mountain mass, Garibyeri area).

Gravestones in form of sheep and horse figures are also met in a number of Shirvan districts.

A figure of human, who puts right hand on his waist and stretches left hand aside, and holds a bird in his open palm, is portrayed on gravestones in shape of stone sculptures of horses and sheep in Lachin and Kalbajar.

Gravestones in shape of stone sheep where were carved scenes related to sheep husbandry, are met in the territory of Yardimli, Lerik, Kalbajar, Fuzuli, Ordubad and other districts of the Azerbaijan SSR, and also in Sisian district of the Armenian SSR. Images on them especially present border scenes, knives for shearing sheep, swords and poniards.

== Gallery ==
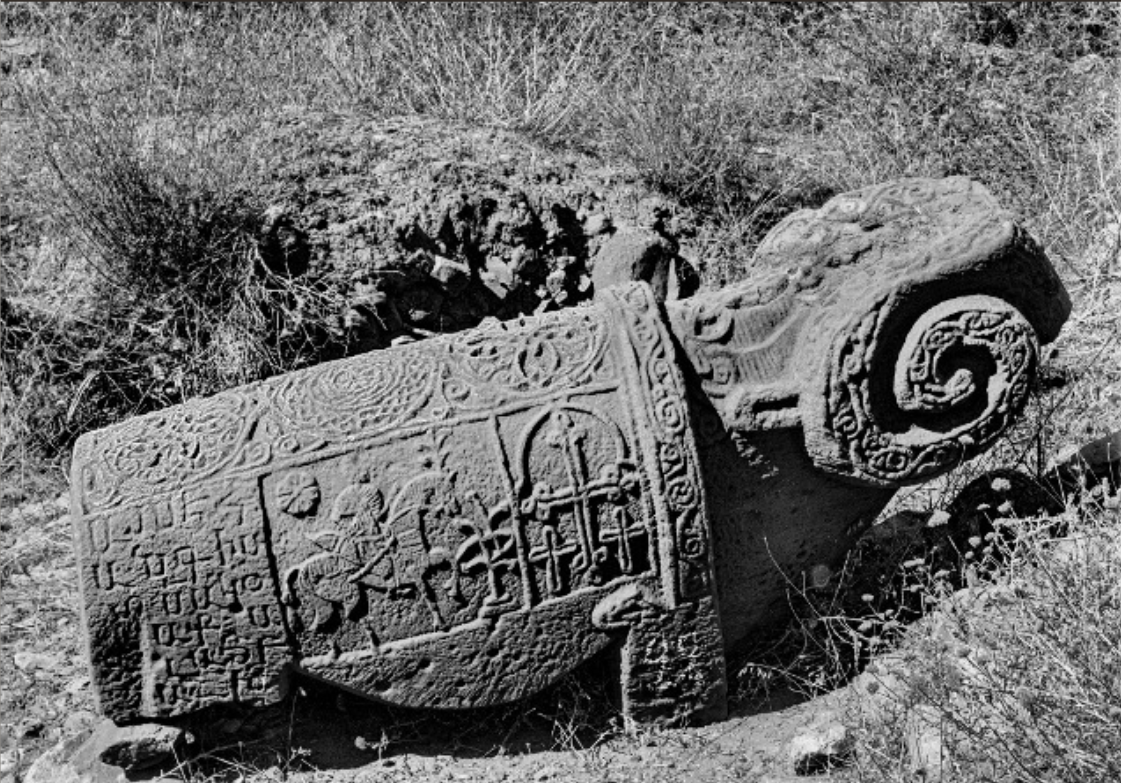
Tombstone in the form of a ram in the Armenian cemetery of Jugha (Julfa)

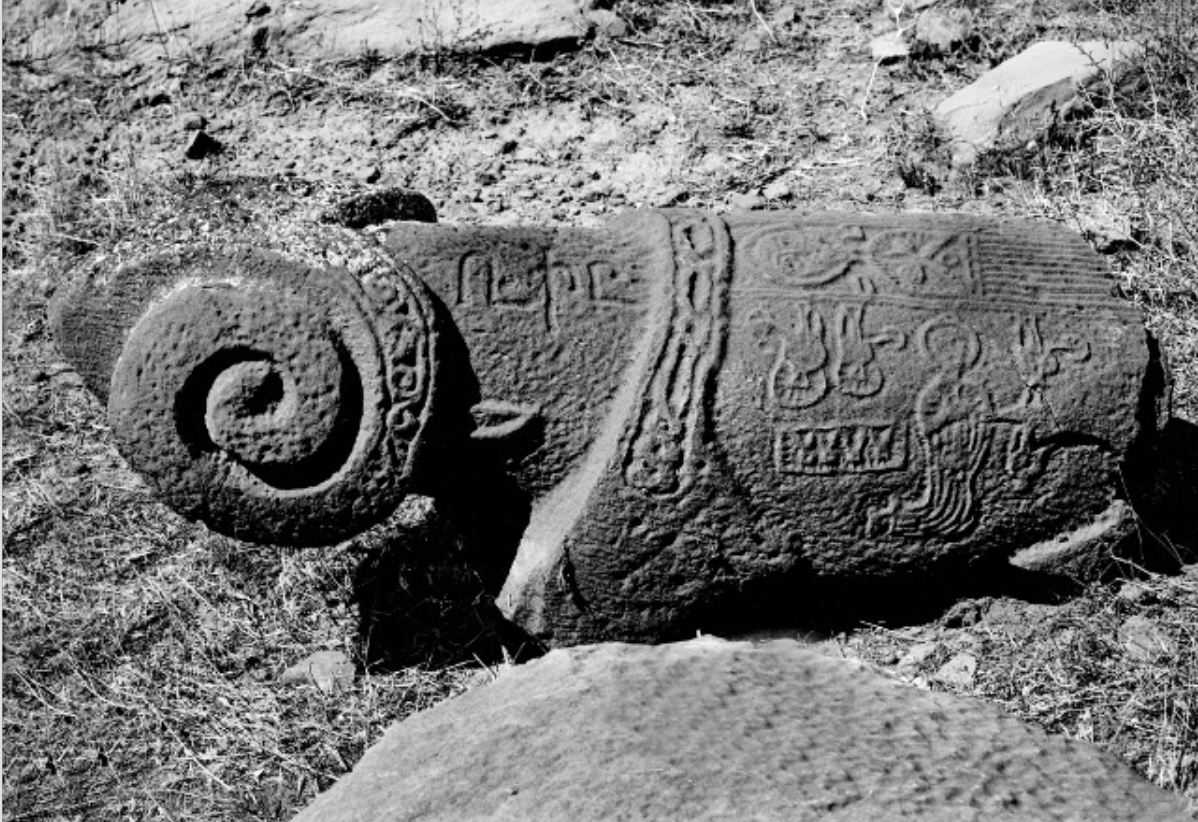
Tombstone in the form of a ram in the Armenian cemetery of Jugha (Julfa)

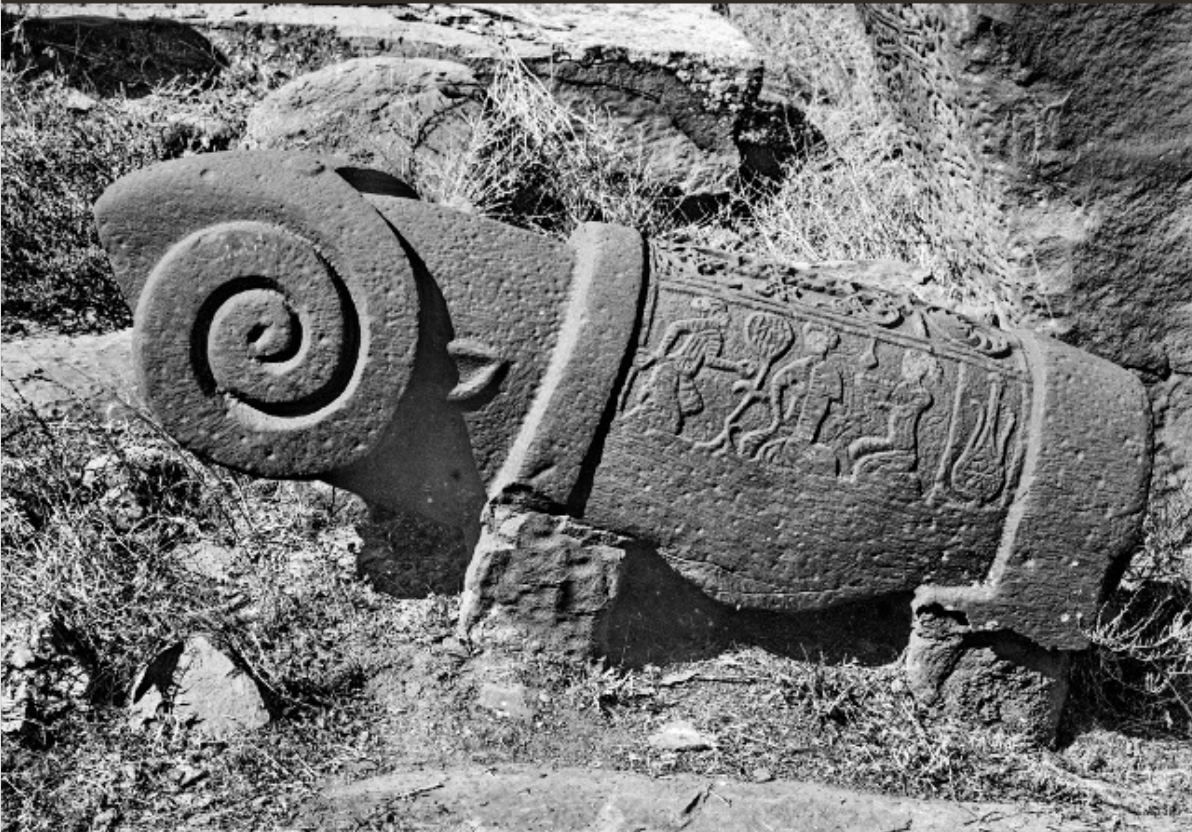
Tombstone in the form of a ram in the Armenian cemetery of Jugha (Julfa)

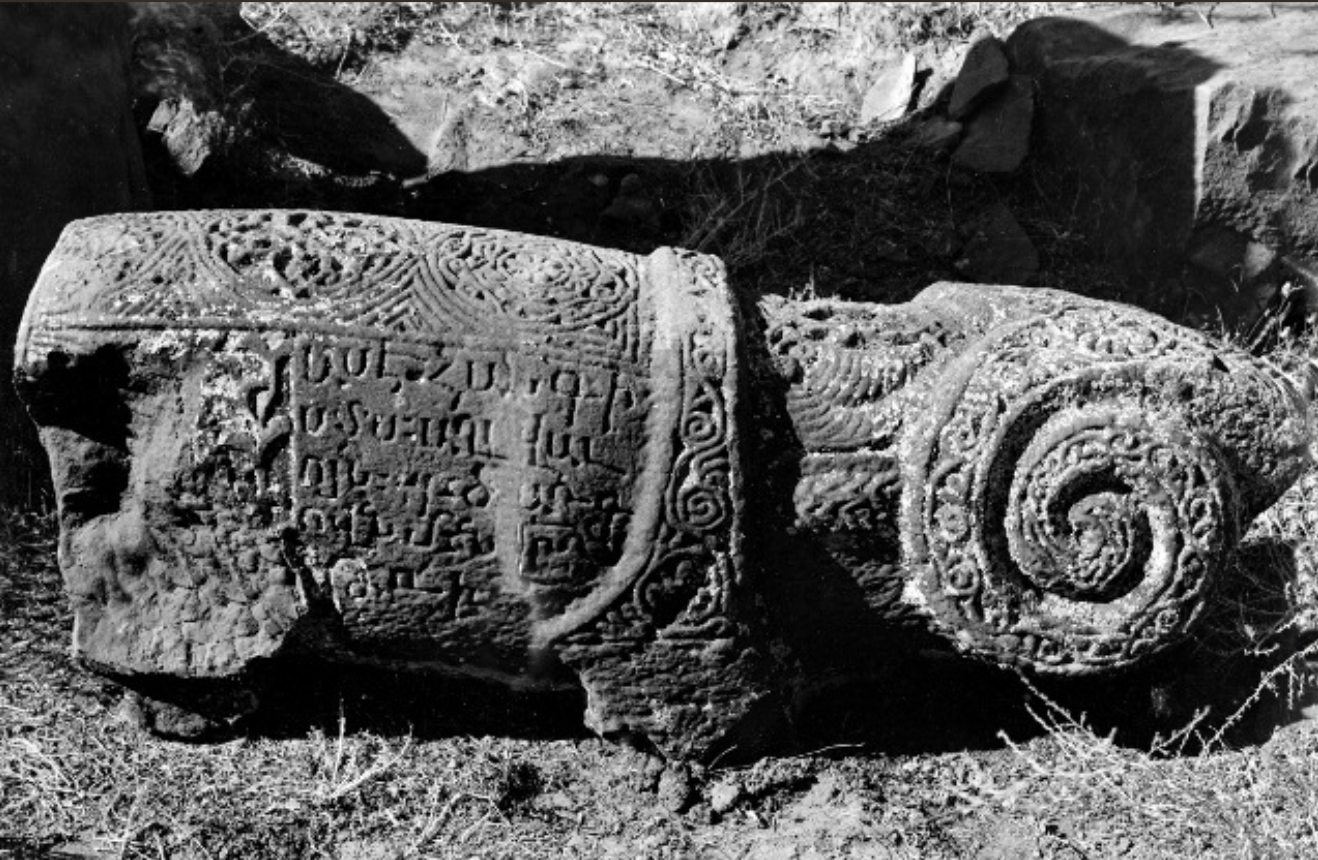
Tombstone in the form of a ram in the Armenian cemetery of Jugha (Julfa)

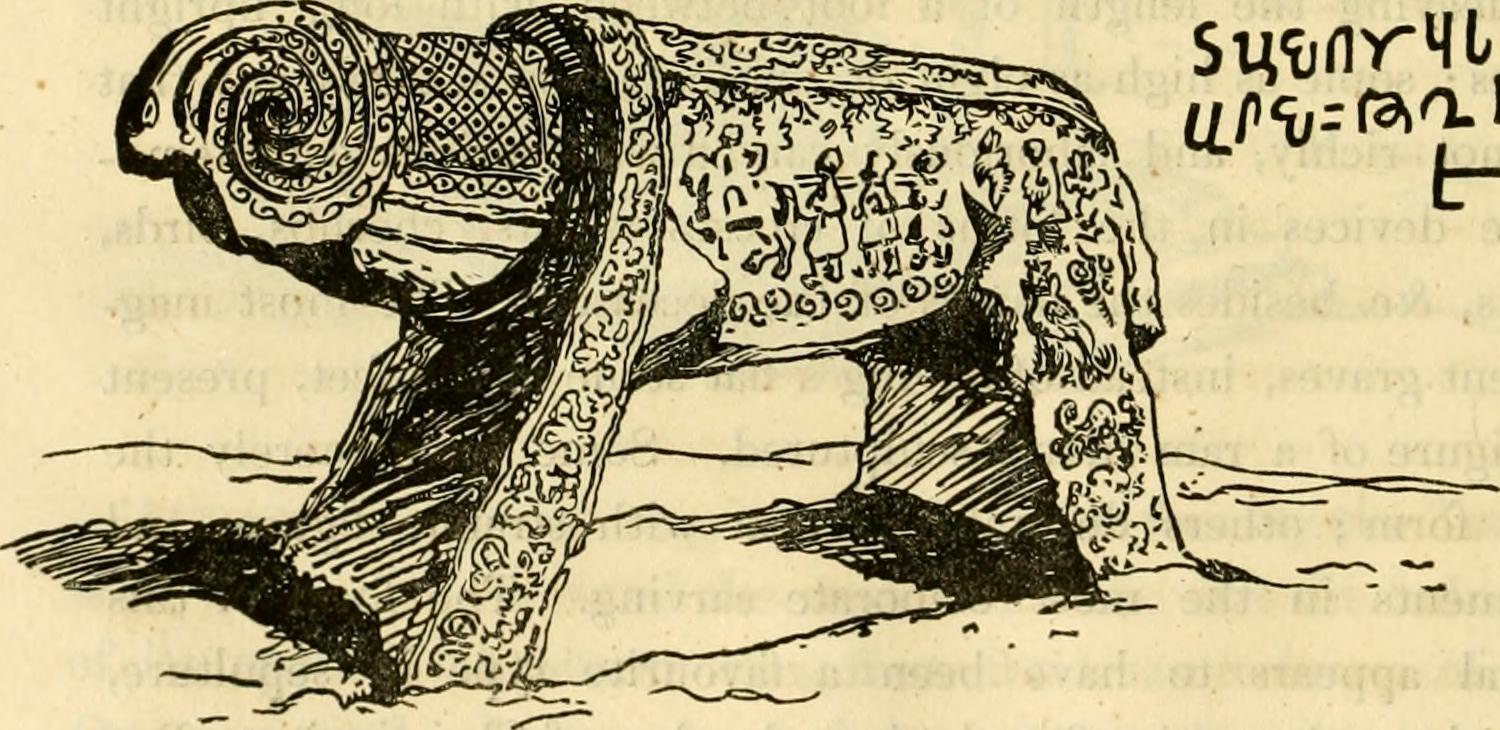
Reconstruction of Tombstone in the form of a ram in the Armenian cemetery of Jugha (Julfa)
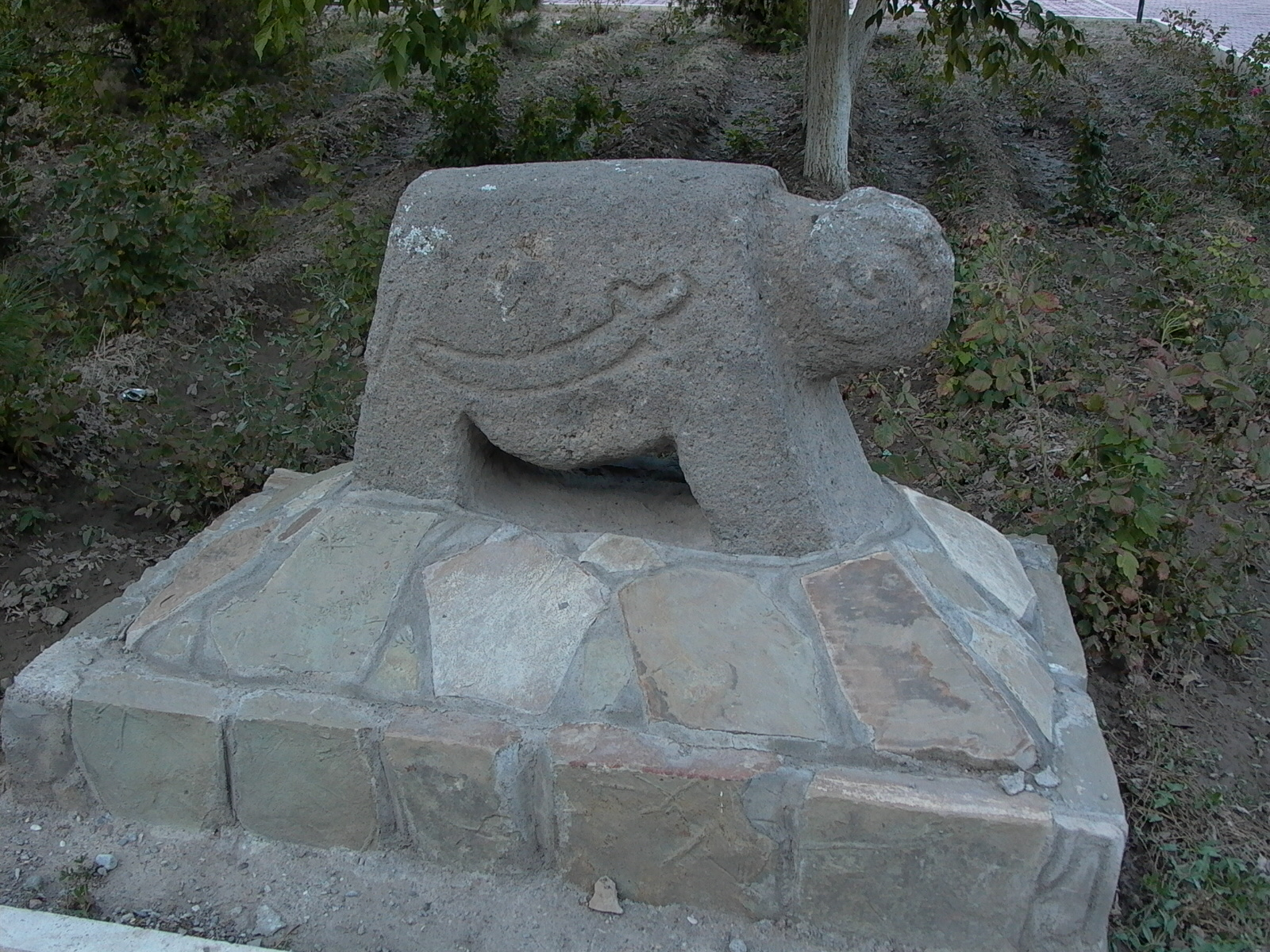
Stone sculpture of sheep in Nakhchivan.

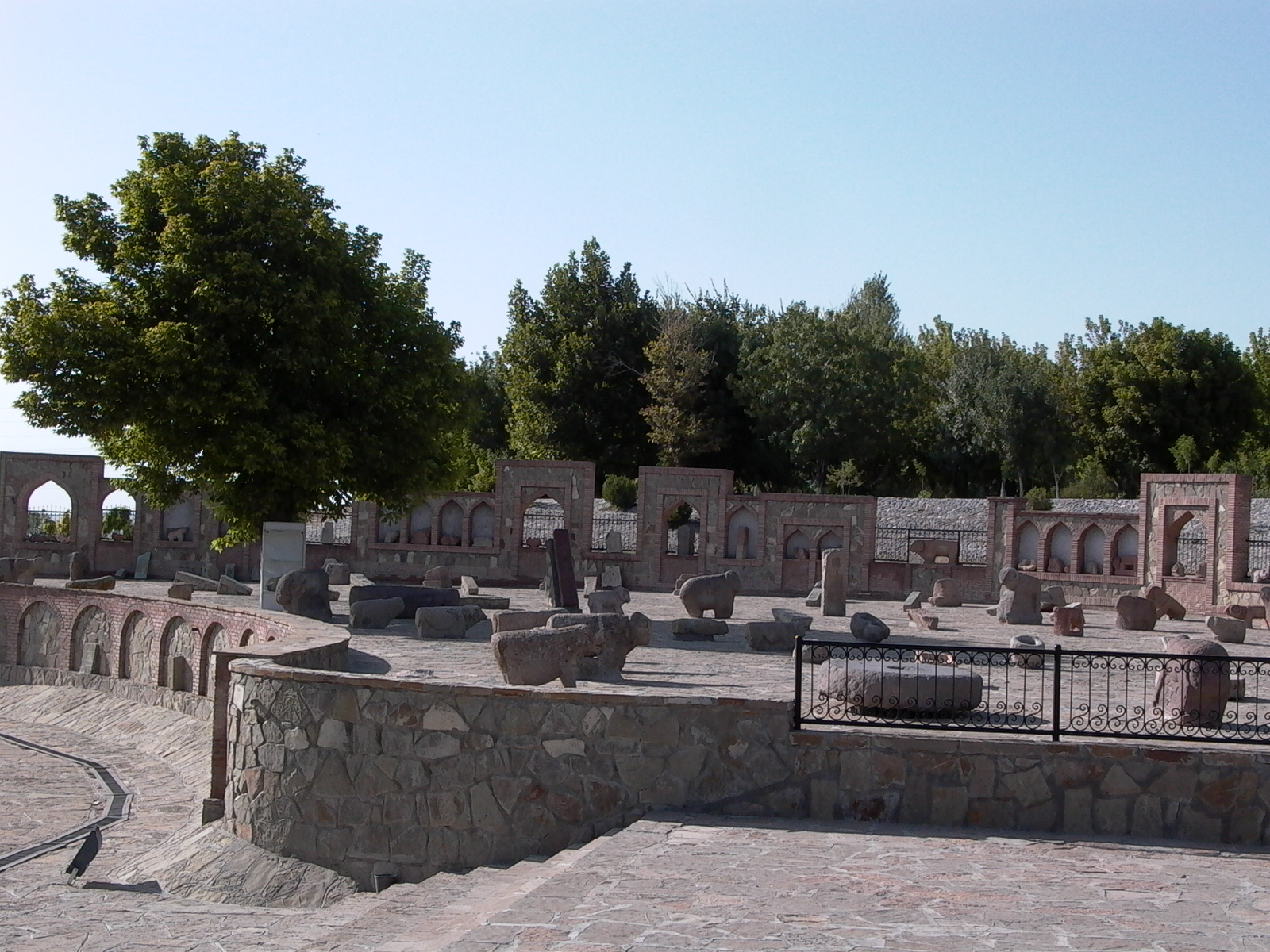
Stone sculptures of sheep in the museum-park under the open sky called "Gizlar bulagi" (Girls' spring) in Nakhchivan.
Stone sculptures of sheep kept in the yard of khanaki in Icheri Sheher, Baku

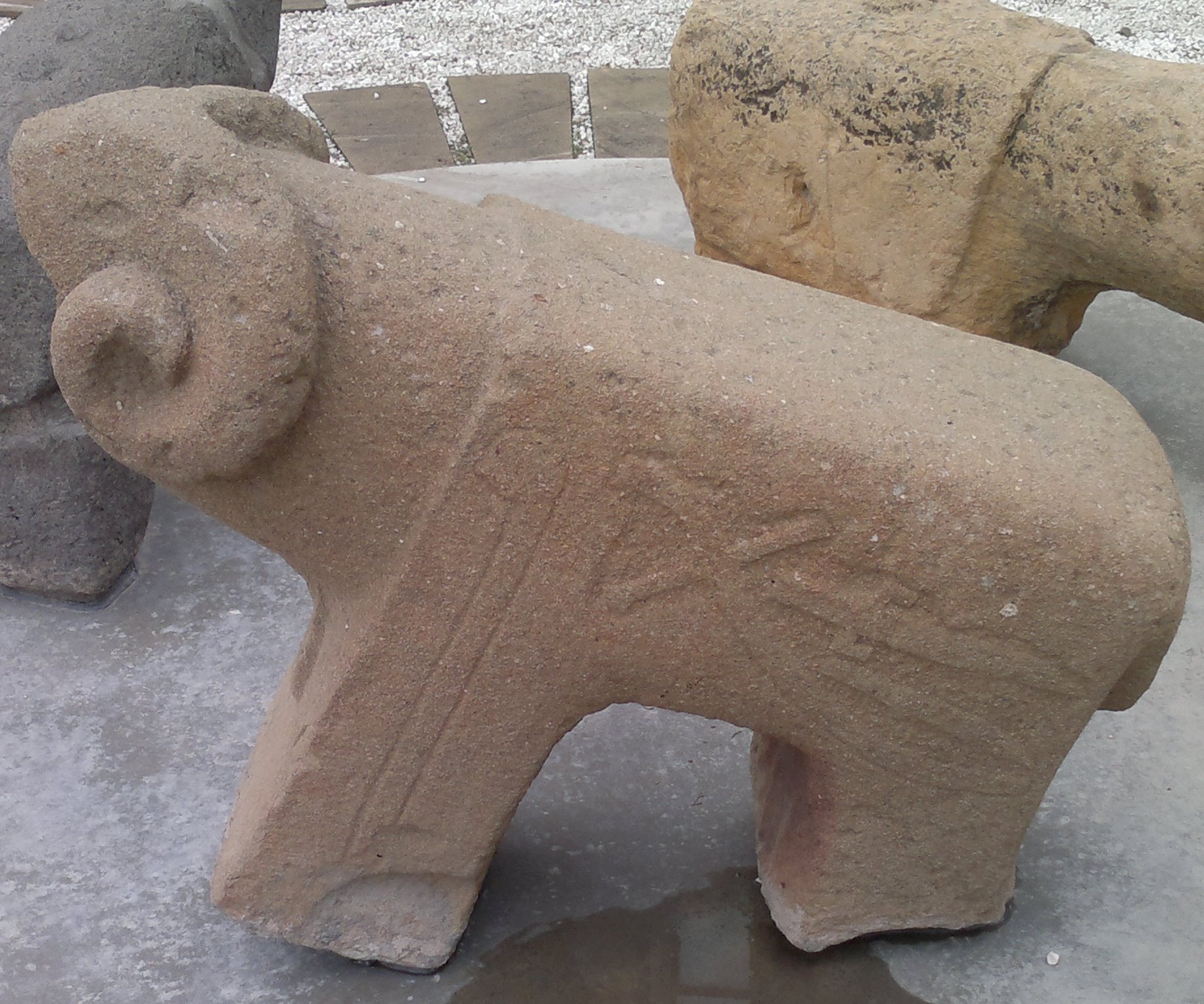
Stone sculpture of sheep, 13th-16th centuries.

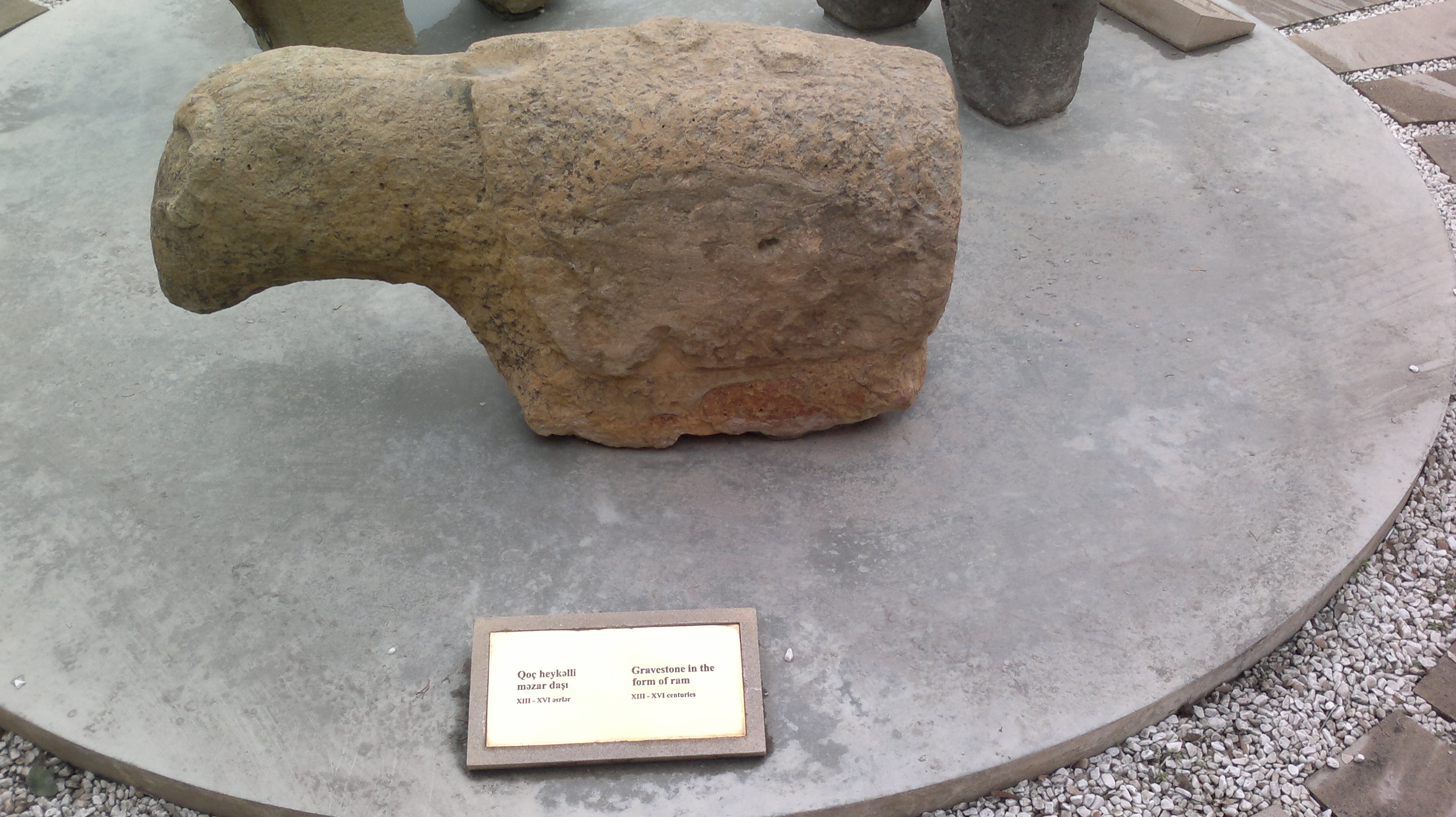
Stone sculpture of sheep, 13th-16th centuries.

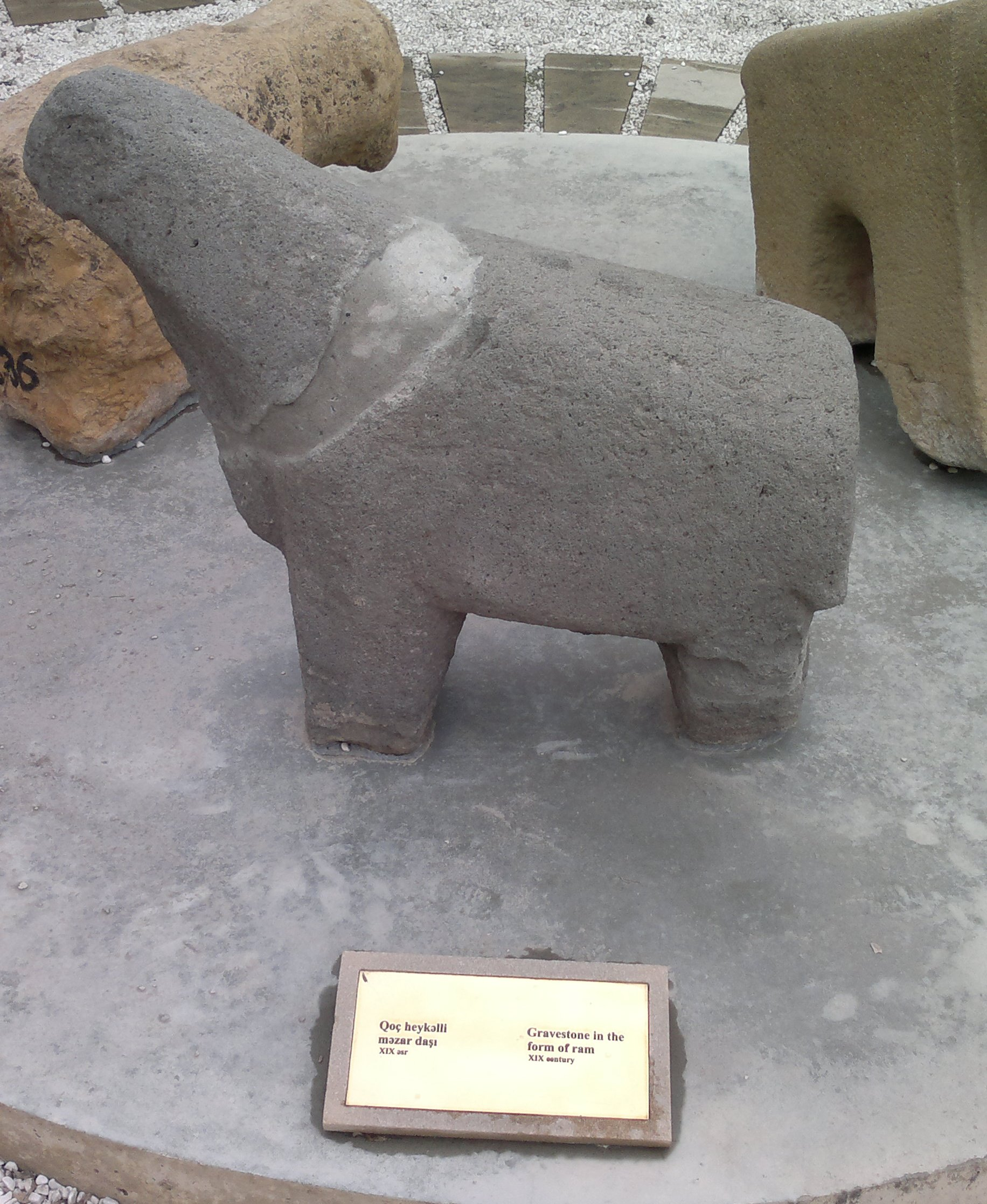
Stone sculpture of sheep, 19th century.
Stone sculptures of sheep and horses in Armenia

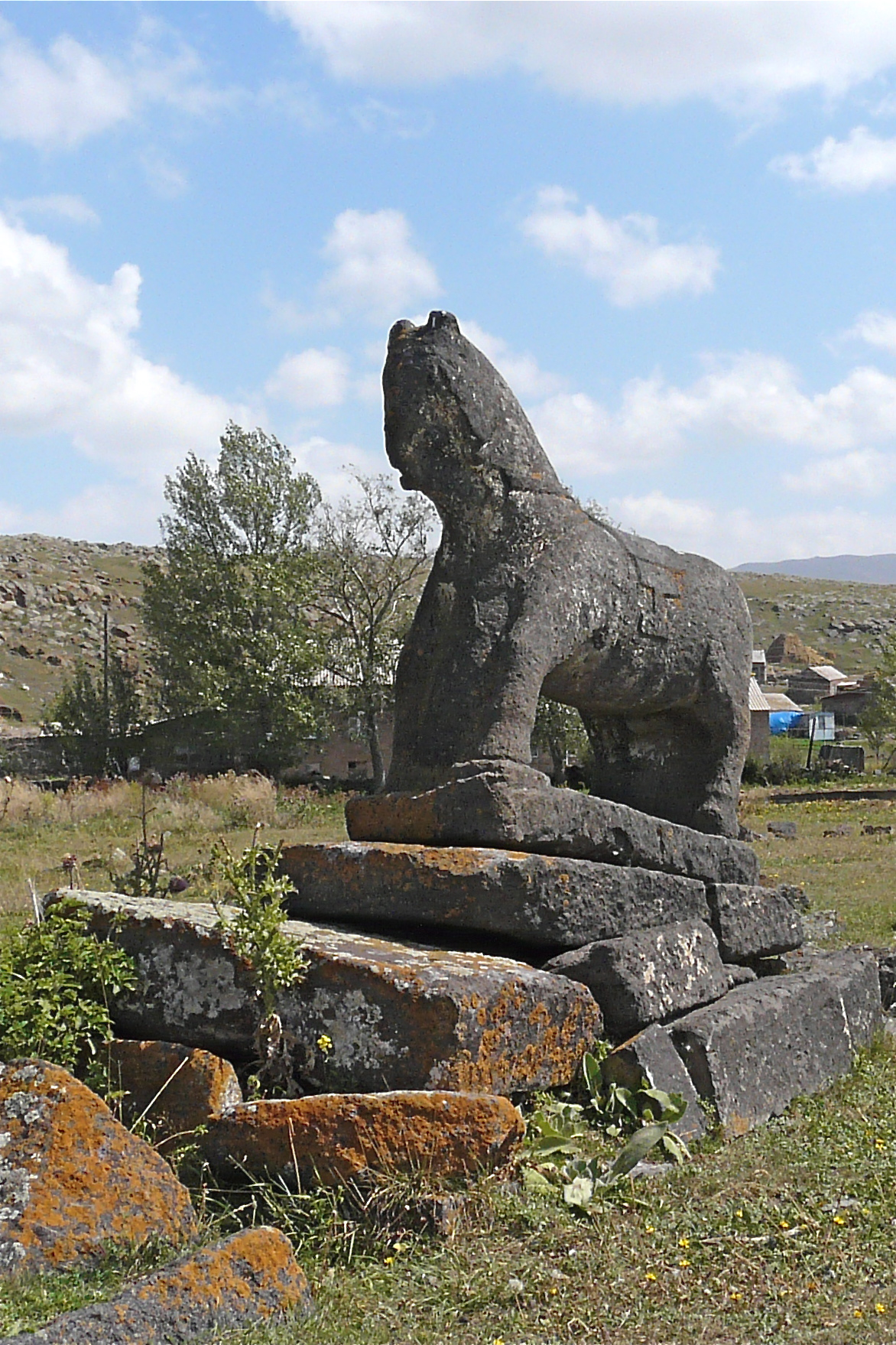

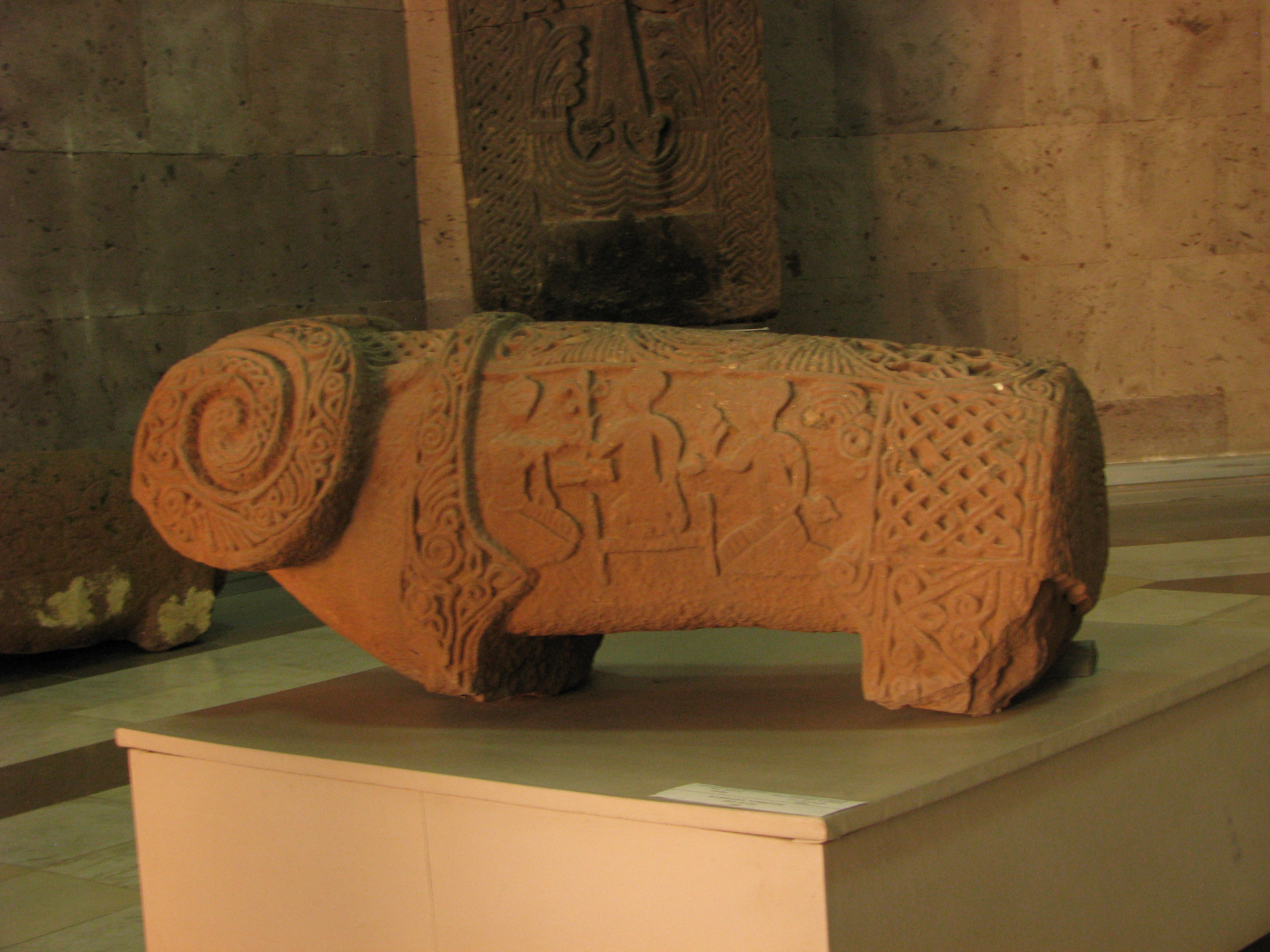
Stone sheep sculpture in Sardarapat Museum

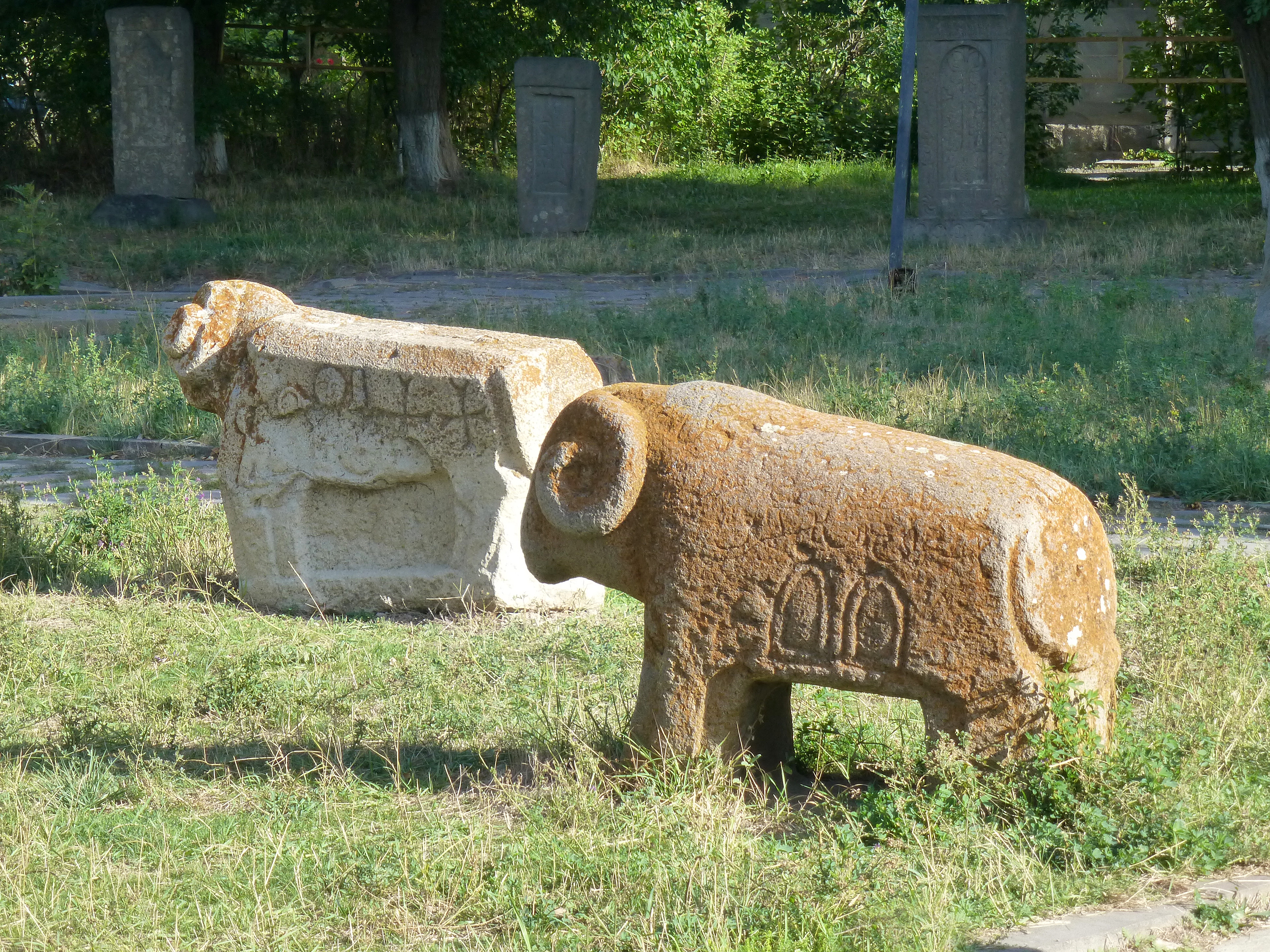
Stone sheep sculpture in Sisian

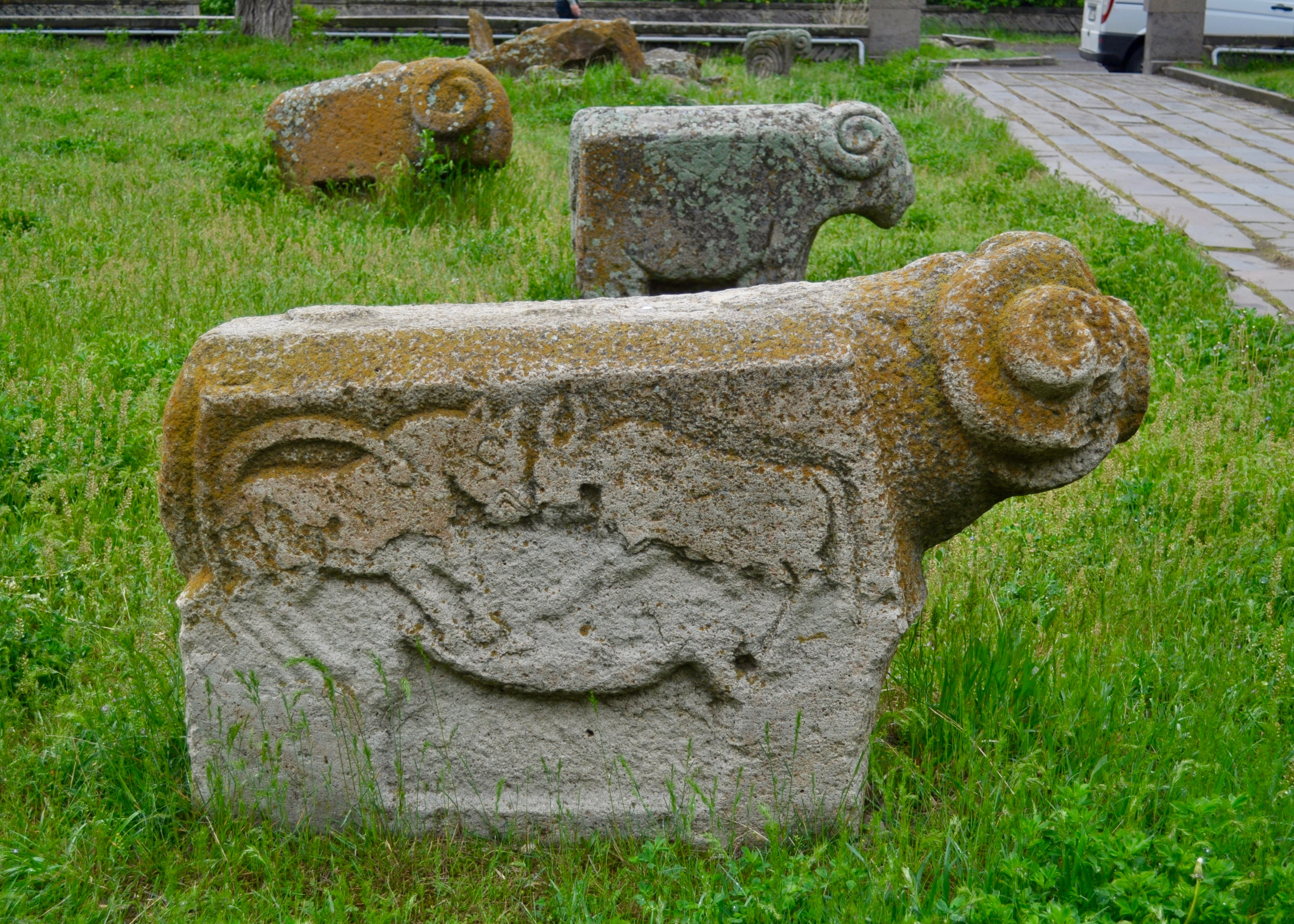
Stone sheep sculpture in Sisian

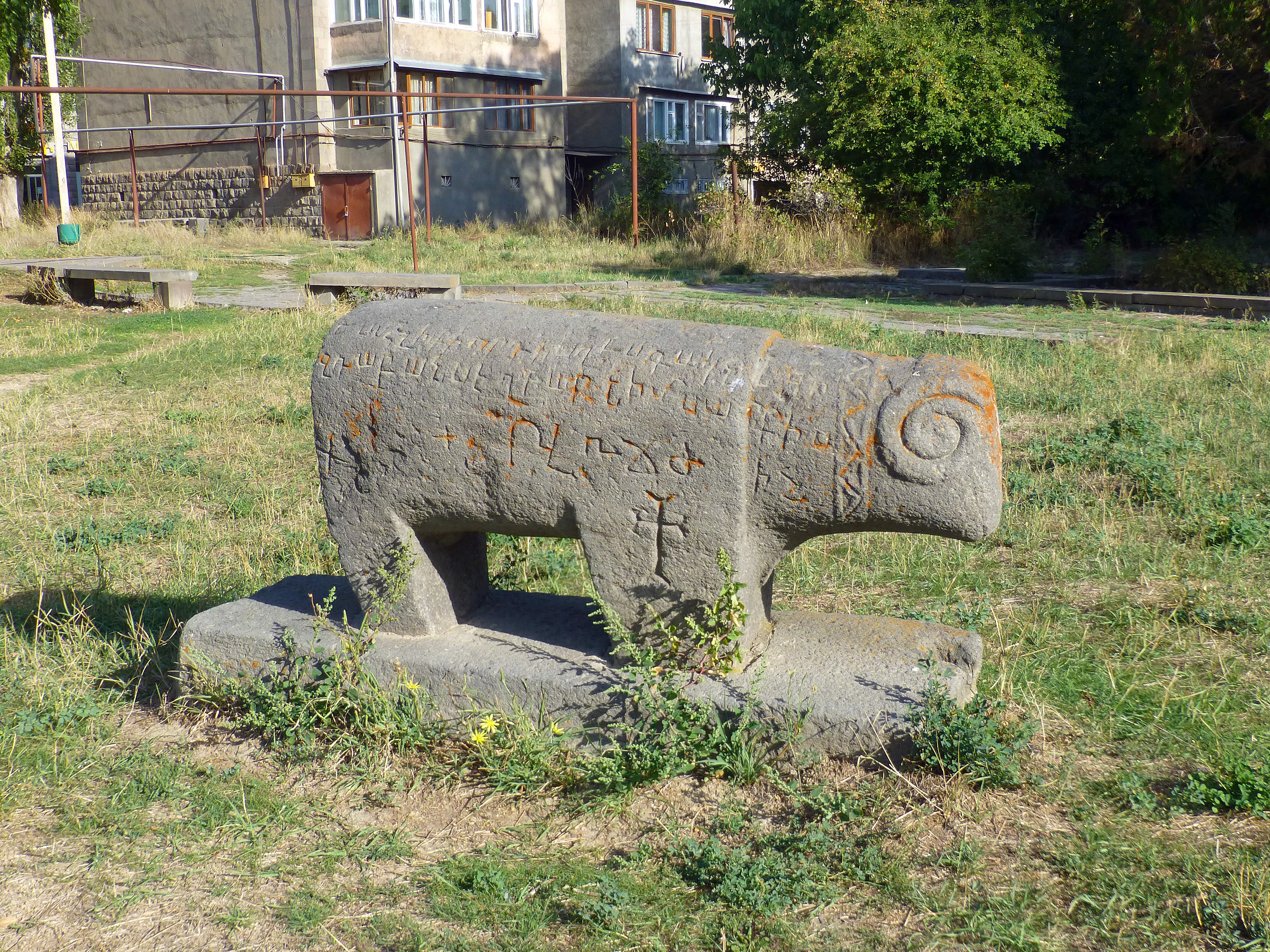
Stone sheep sculpture in Sisian

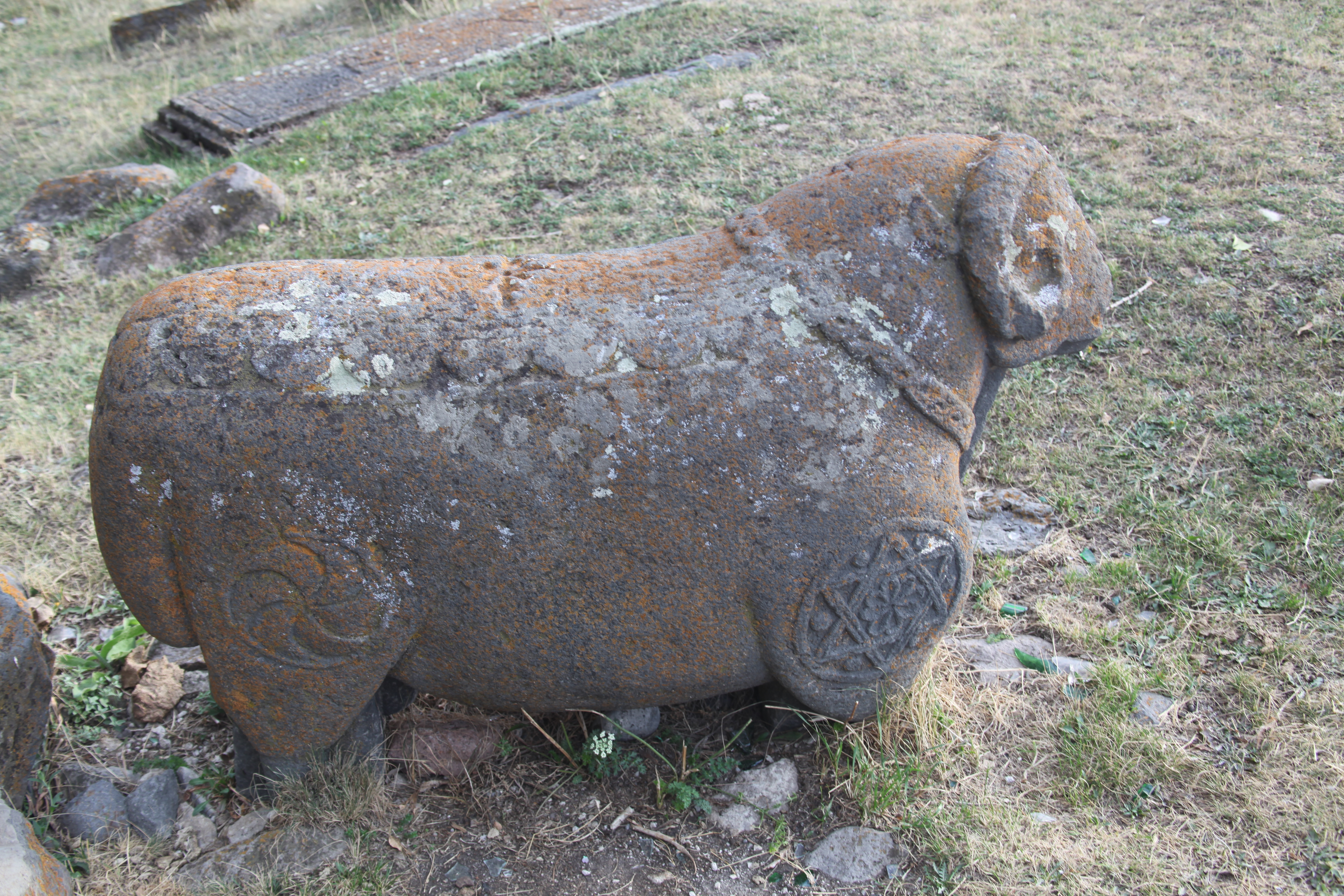
Stone sheep sculpture in Zolakar

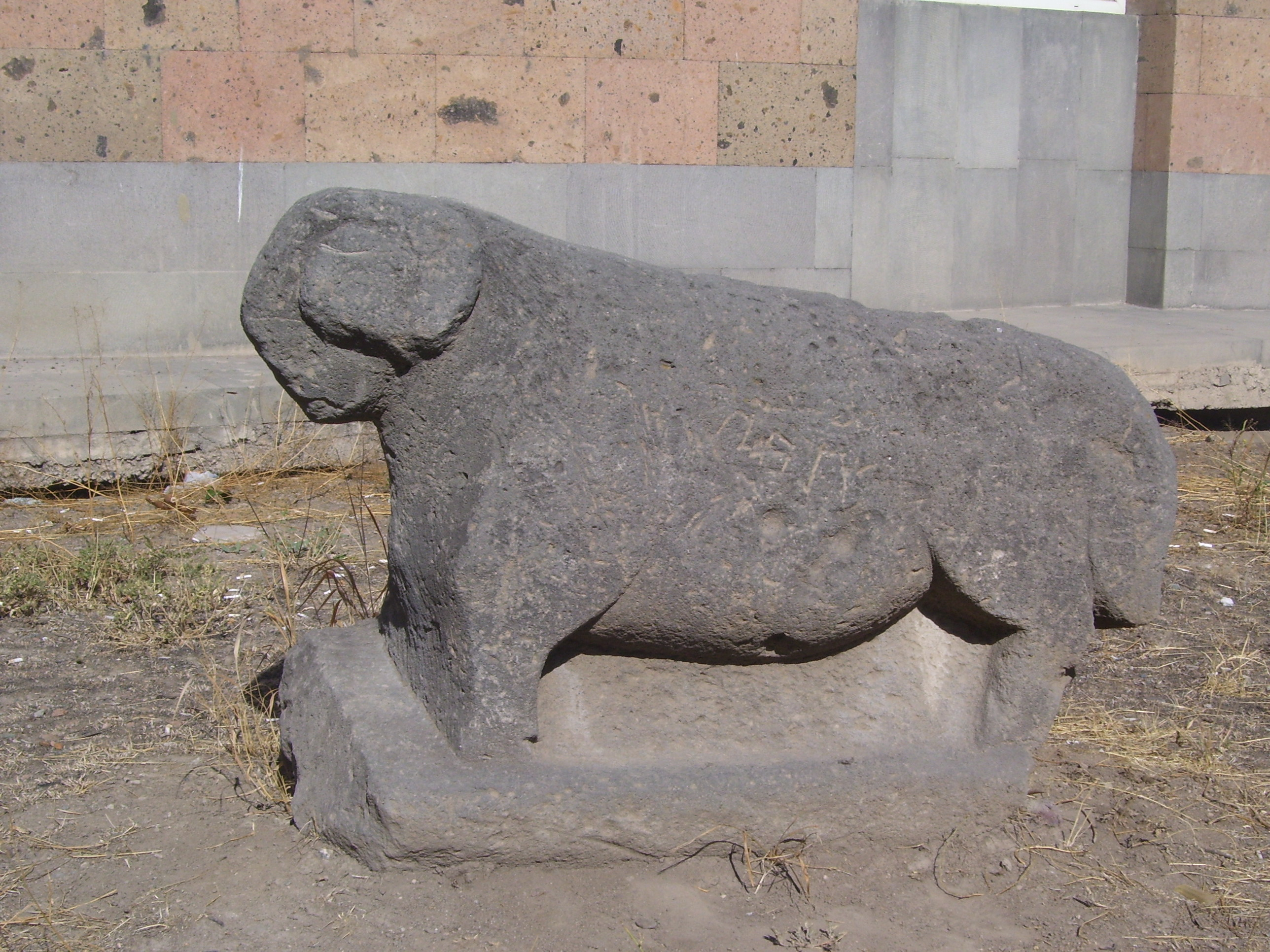

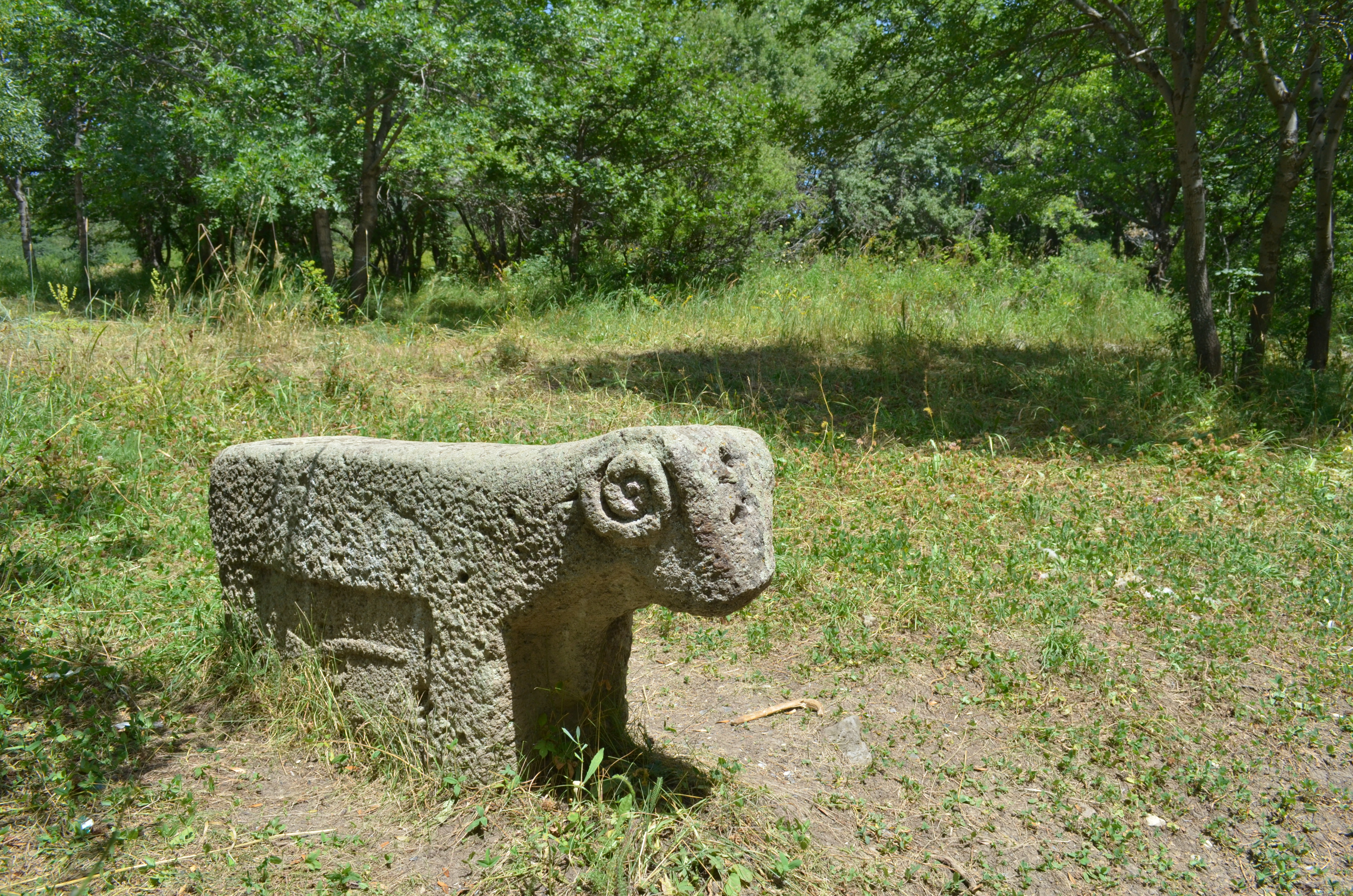

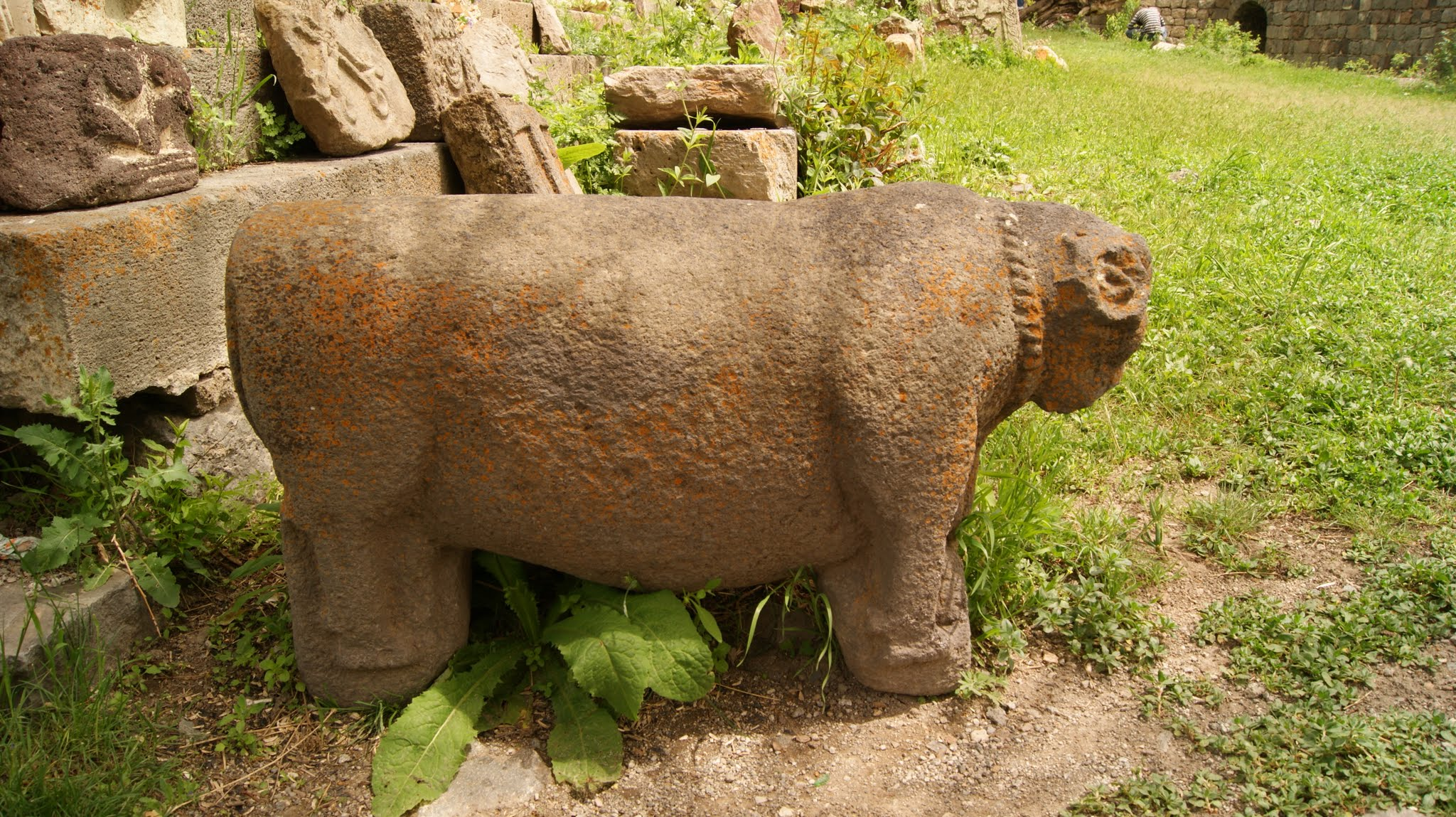

== Literature ==
- И. М. и С. К. Джафарзаде. Азербайджанские намогильные камни. // журнал : Советская этнография. — Народный комиссариат просвещения, Академия наук СССР, Институт этнографии имени Н.Н. Миклухо-Маклая: Издательство Академии наук СССР, 1956. — С. 104–106.
- Кандидат исторических наук Мубариз Халилов. Древние каменные изваяния Южного Кавказа. // журнал : IRS Наследие. — 2003. — No. 8.
- Доктор исторических наук М. С. Нейматова. Эпиграфические памятники Карабаха. // журнал : IRS Наследие. — 2005. — No. 2-3 (14-15).
