= Türklər =

Türklər (Turkler) may refer to:

- Türklər, Beylagan, Azerbaijan
- Türklər, Lachin, Azerbaijan
- Türkler, Çorum, Turkey
