= Beyler Agayev =

National Hero of Azerbaijan

- Bəylər Ağayev
- Born: 3 February 1969; Qarağac, Qubadli, Azerbaijan SSR
- Died: 6 August 1992 (aged 23); Lachin, Azerbaijan
- Military career
- Allegiance: Azerbaijan
- Branch: Azerbaijani Armed Forces
- Service years: 1992
- Conflicts: First Nagorno-Karabakh War
- Awards: National Hero of Azerbaijan; 1992

Beyler Tapdiq oglu Agayev (Azerbaijani: Bəylər Tapdıq oğlu Ağayev; 3 February 1969, Qarağac, Qubadli, Azerbaijan SSR – 6 August 1992, Lachin, Azerbaijan) was the National Hero of Azerbaijan and warrior during the First Nagorno-Karabakh War.

== Early life and education ==
Agayev was born on 3 February 1969 in Qarağac village of Qubadli raion of Azerbaijan SSR. After completing his military service in the German Democratic Republic, he returned to Azerbaijan. In 1990, he entered Azerbaijan State Institute of Civil Engineers. When Armenians attacked the territories of Azerbaijan, he left his education unfinished and voluntarily joined Azerbaijani Armed Forces.

Agayev was single.

== First Nagorno-Karabakh War ==
Aghayev's high ability attracted attention and was appointed the commander of one of the divisions. He participated in battles for the villages of Səfiyan, Yuxarı Fərəcan and Aşağı Fərəcan, Mazutlu, Türklər və Suarası.

On 6 August 1992 Agayev was shot dead while taking part in the battles for Lachin District of Azerbaijan.

== Honors ==
Beyler Tapdiq oglu Agayev was posthumously awarded the title of the "National Hero of Azerbaijan" under Presidential Decree No. 350 dated 7 December 1992. Aliyev was buried at a cemetery in Qarağac village.

A secondary school in Qarağac village of Qubadli raion was named after him.

== See also ==
- First Nagorno-Karabakh War
- List of National Heroes of Azerbaijan
