= Qarağac, Qubadli =

Qarağac
- Location within Azerbaijan
- Coordinates: 39°23′40″N 46°38′54″E
- Country: Azerbaijan
- District: Qubadli

Population (2015)
  - Total: 124
- Time zone: UTC+4 (AZT)

Qarağac (Garaghaj) is a village in the Qubadli District of Azerbaijan.

== History ==
The village was located in the Armenian-occupied territories surrounding Nagorno-Karabakh, coming under the control of ethnic Armenian forces during the First Nagorno-Karabakh War in the early 1990s. The village subsequently became part of the breakaway Republic of Artsakh as part of its Kashatagh Province, referred to as Getap (Armenian: Գետափ). It was recaptured by Azerbaijan during the 2020 Nagorno-Karabakh war.

There was a secondary school in the village named after Beyler Agayev, a National Hero of Azerbaijan, who was born in Qarağac.
