= Zolakar =

Village in Gegharkunik, Armenia

Zolakar Զոլաքար
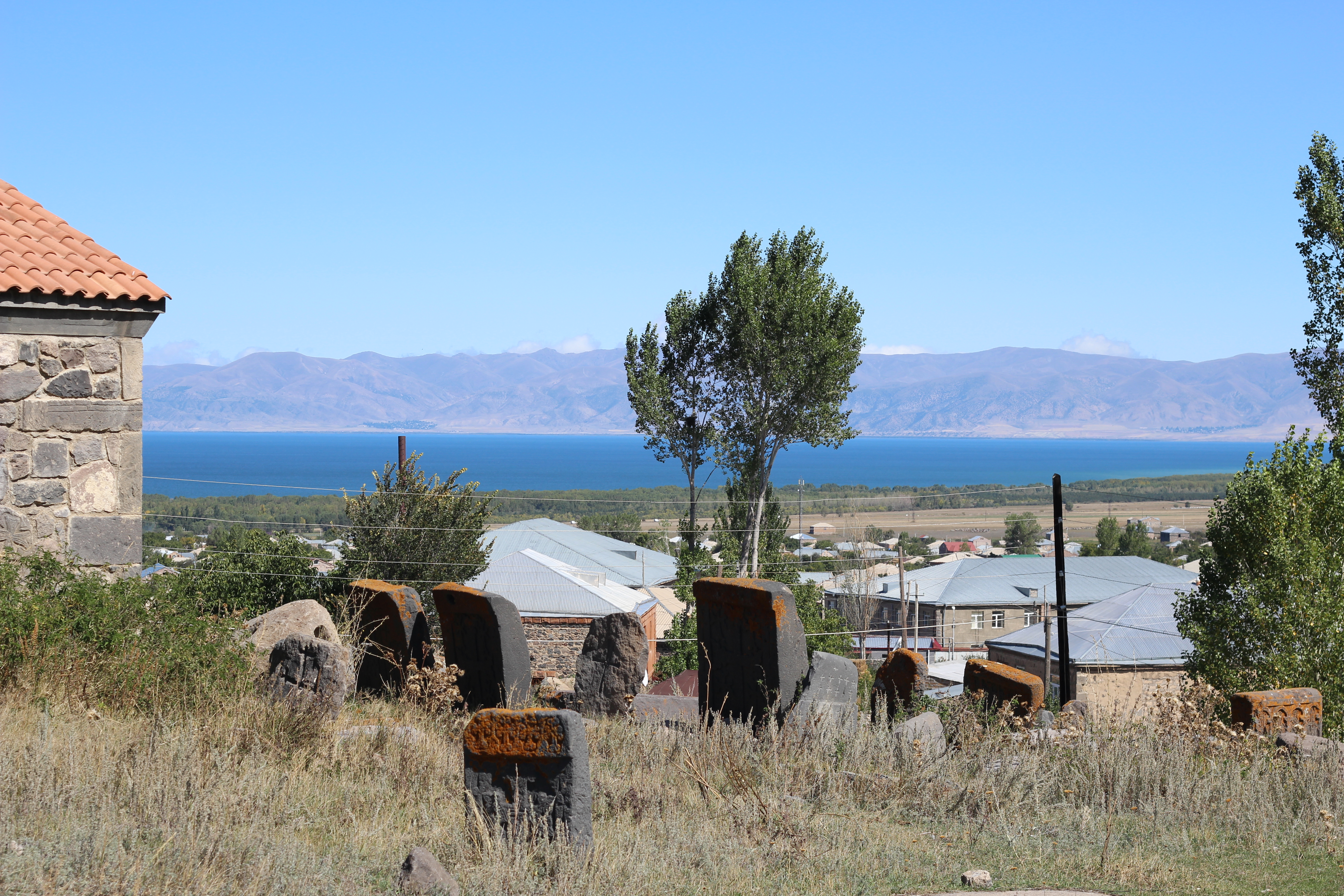
- A view of Zolakar and Lake Sevan from St. George's Church

- Location within Armenia Location within Gegharkunik
- Coordinates: 40°07′30″N 45°22′30″E
- Country: Armenia
- Province: Gegharkunik
- Municipality: Martuni
- Founded: 1829
- Elevation: 1,999 m (6,558 ft)

Population (2011)
  - Total: 6,381
- Time zone: UTC+4 (AMT)
- Postal code: 1407

Zolakar (Armenian: Զոլաքար), is a village in the Martuni Municipality of the Gegharkunik Province of Armenia.

== Etymology ==
The village was known as Zolakhach until 1935.

== History ==
The village was founded in 1829 by emigrants from Alashkert. Zolakar is home to the historic St. George's Church, Tukh Manuk chapels, as well as Bronze Age cemeteries. In the center of the village is a funerary monument.

== Gallery ==
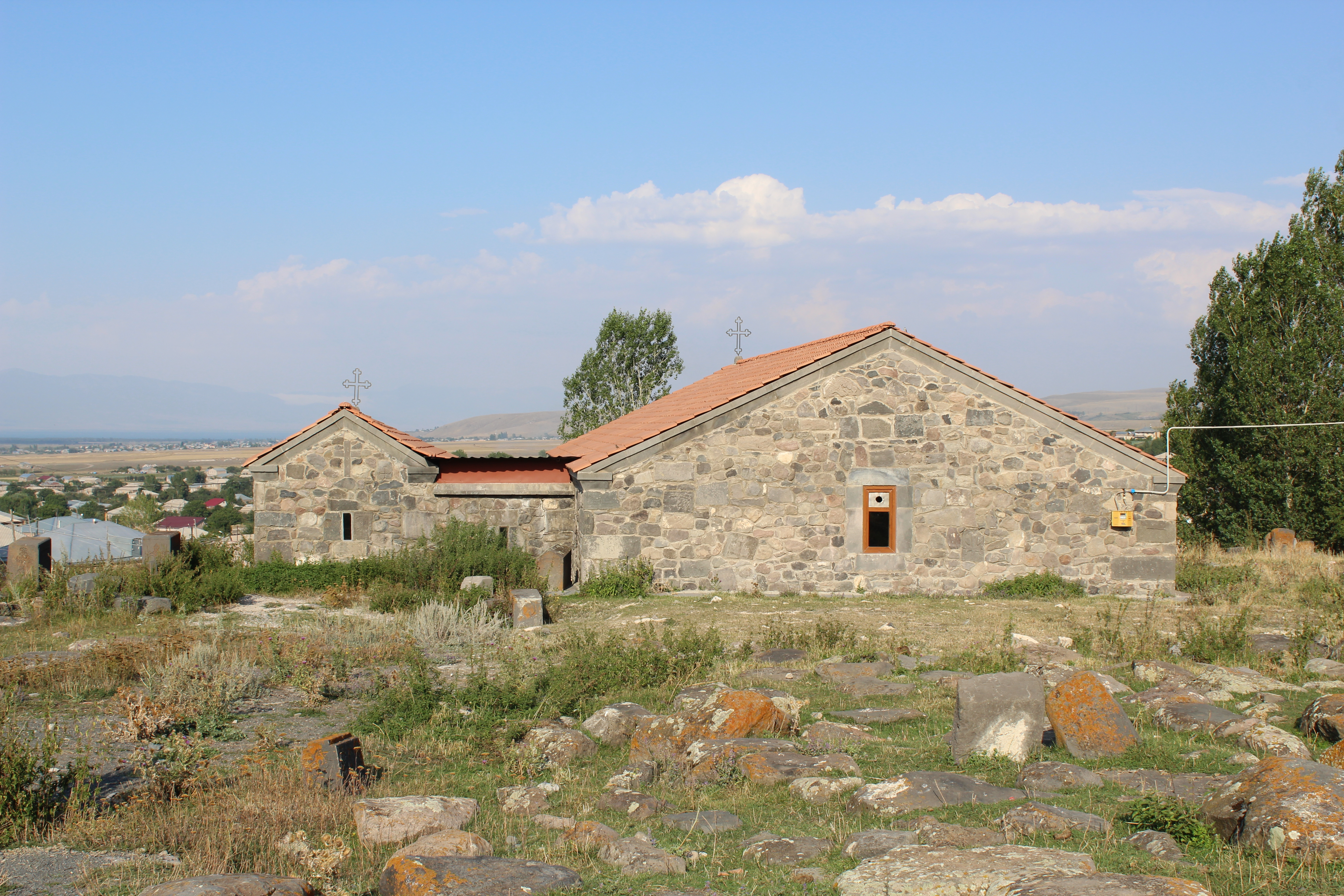
St. George's Church of Zolakar

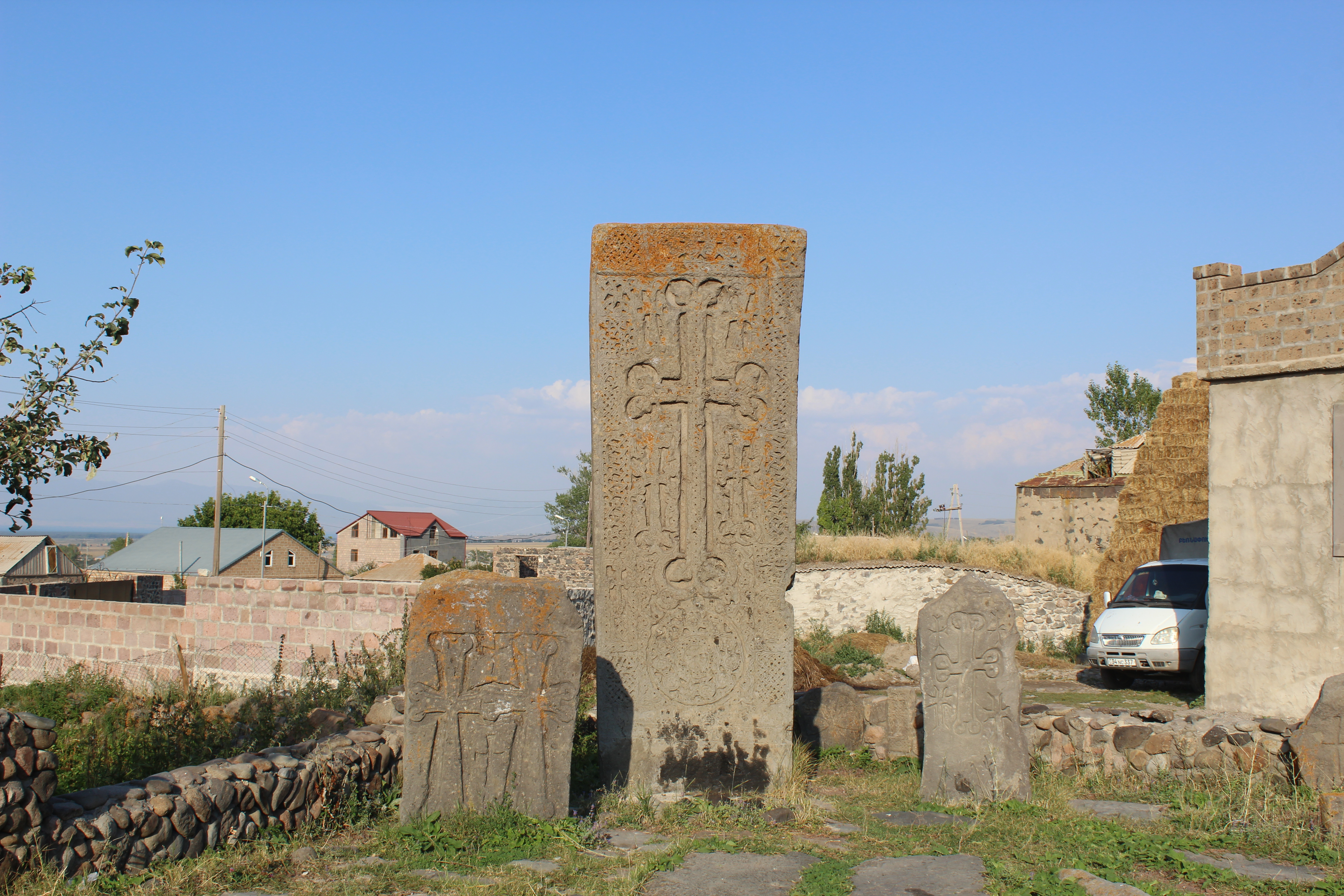
Khachkars in Zolakar

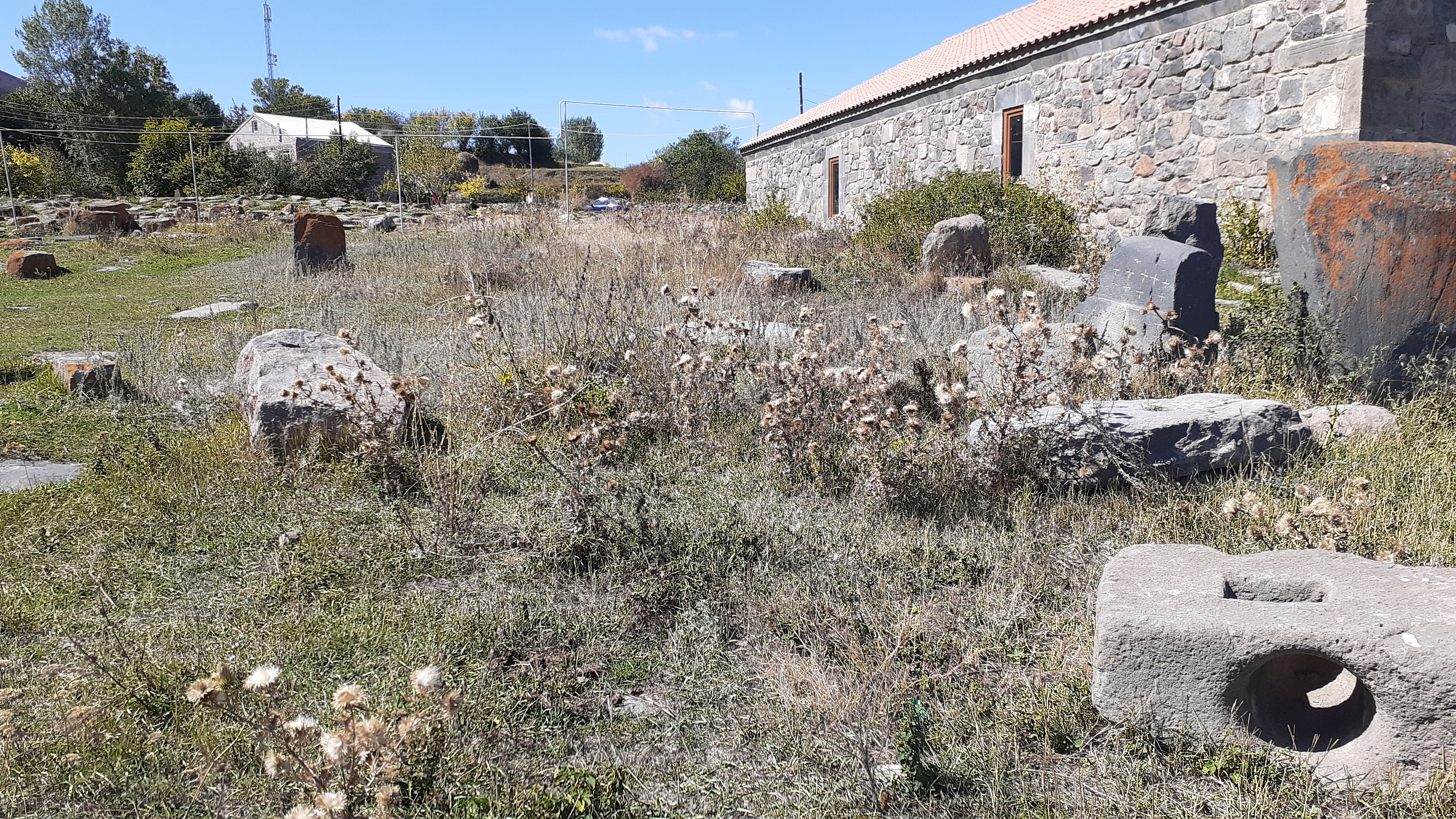
Zolakar cemetery

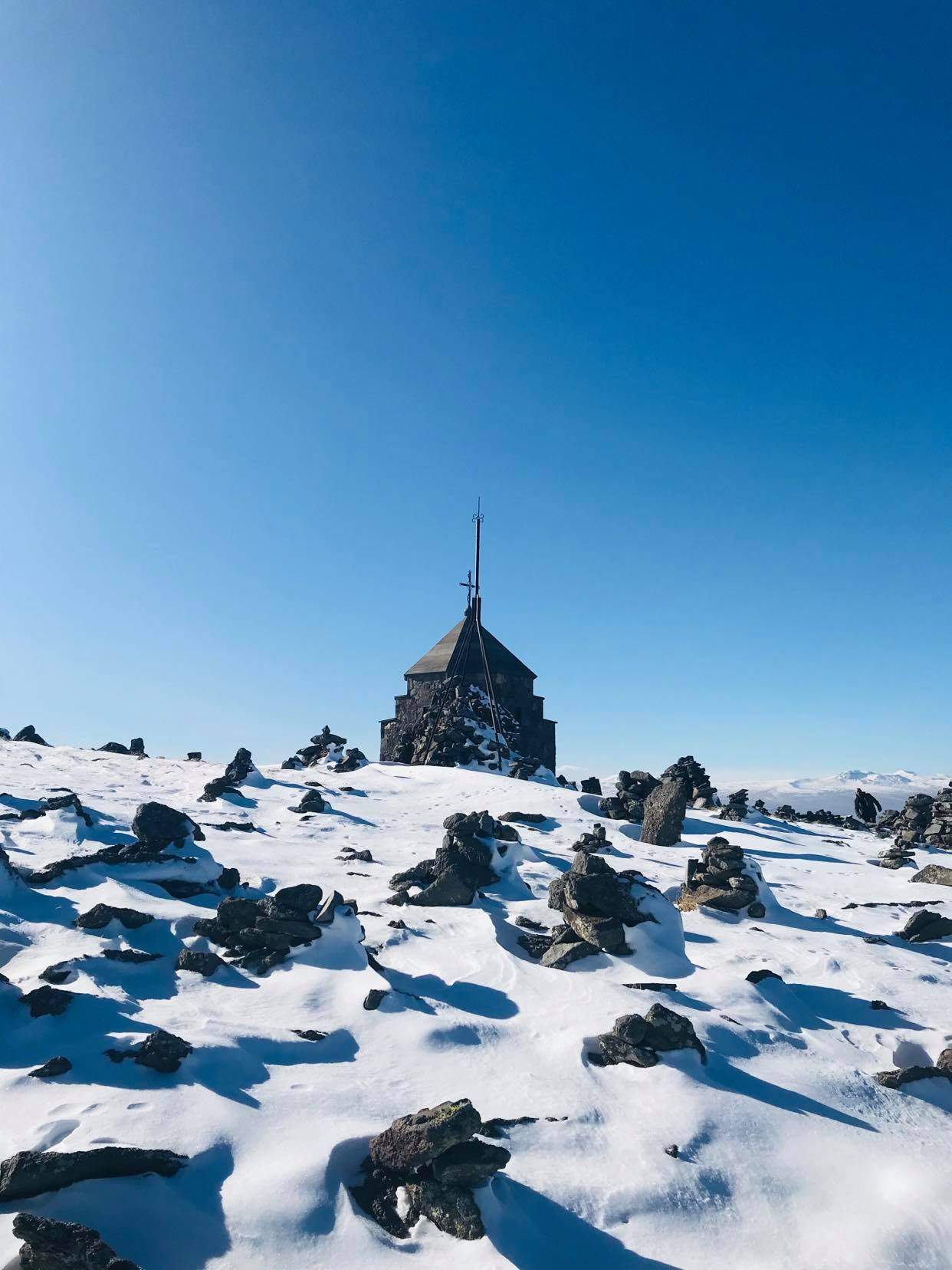
St. Hovhannes Chapel

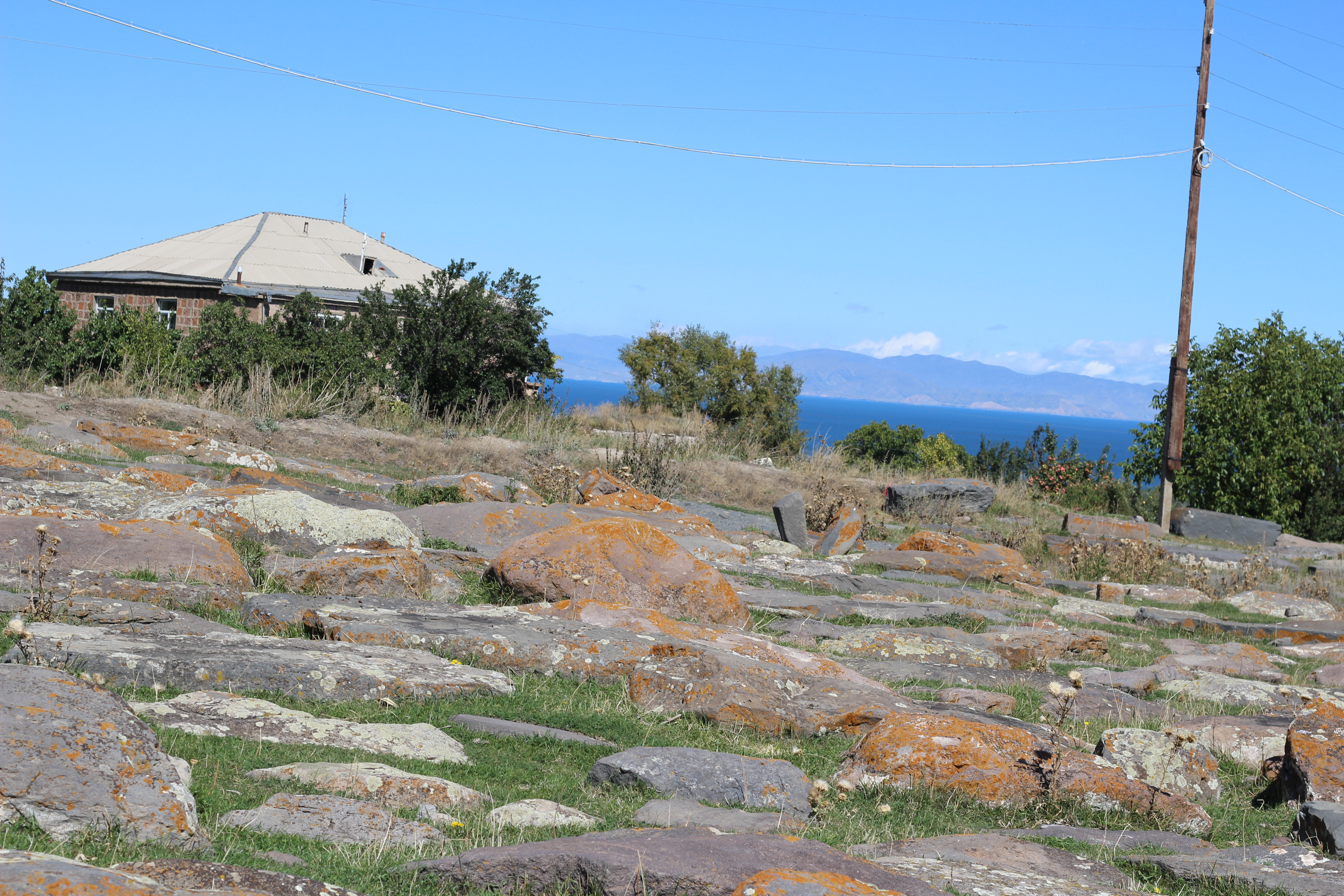
Zolakar cemetery

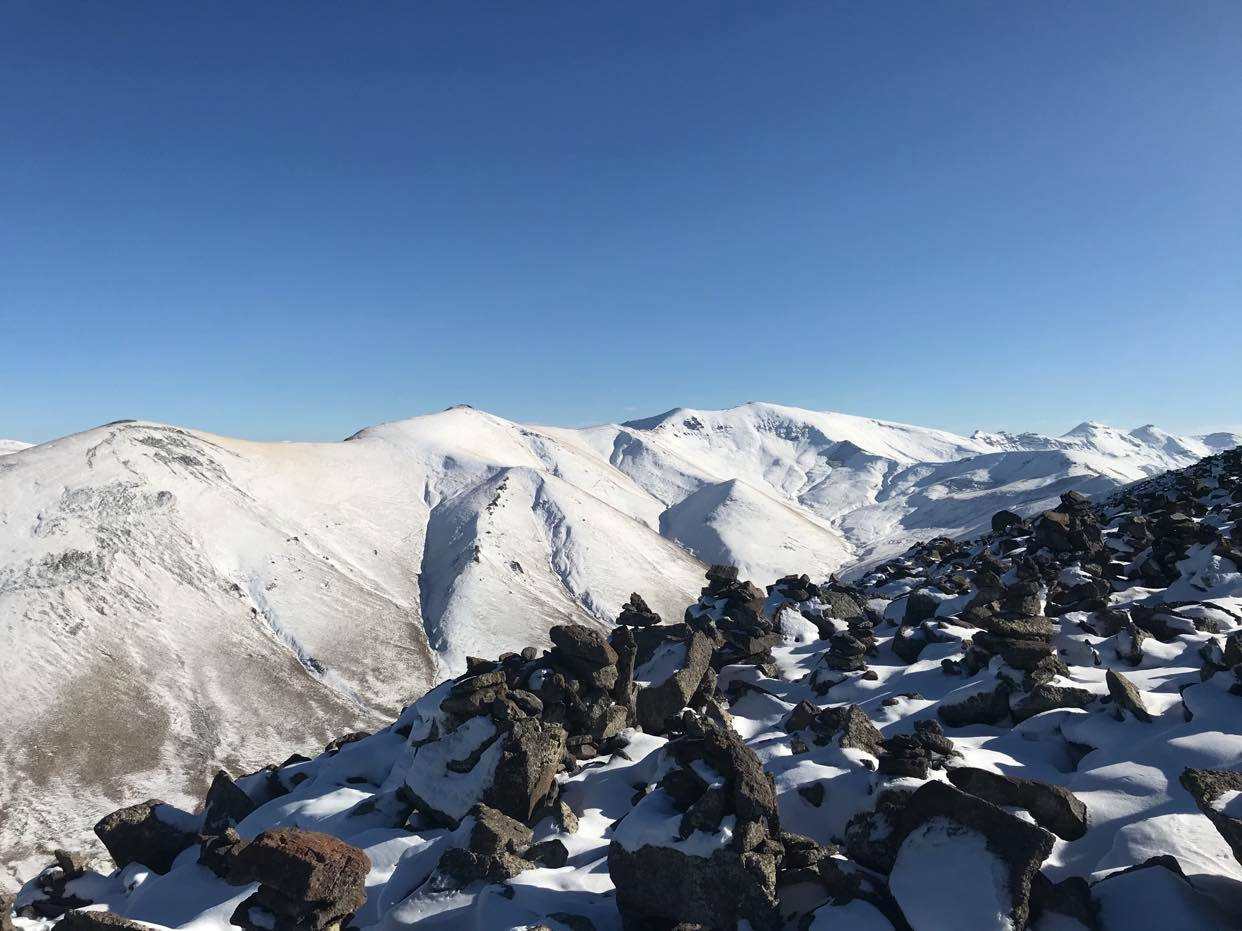
Scenery around Zolakar

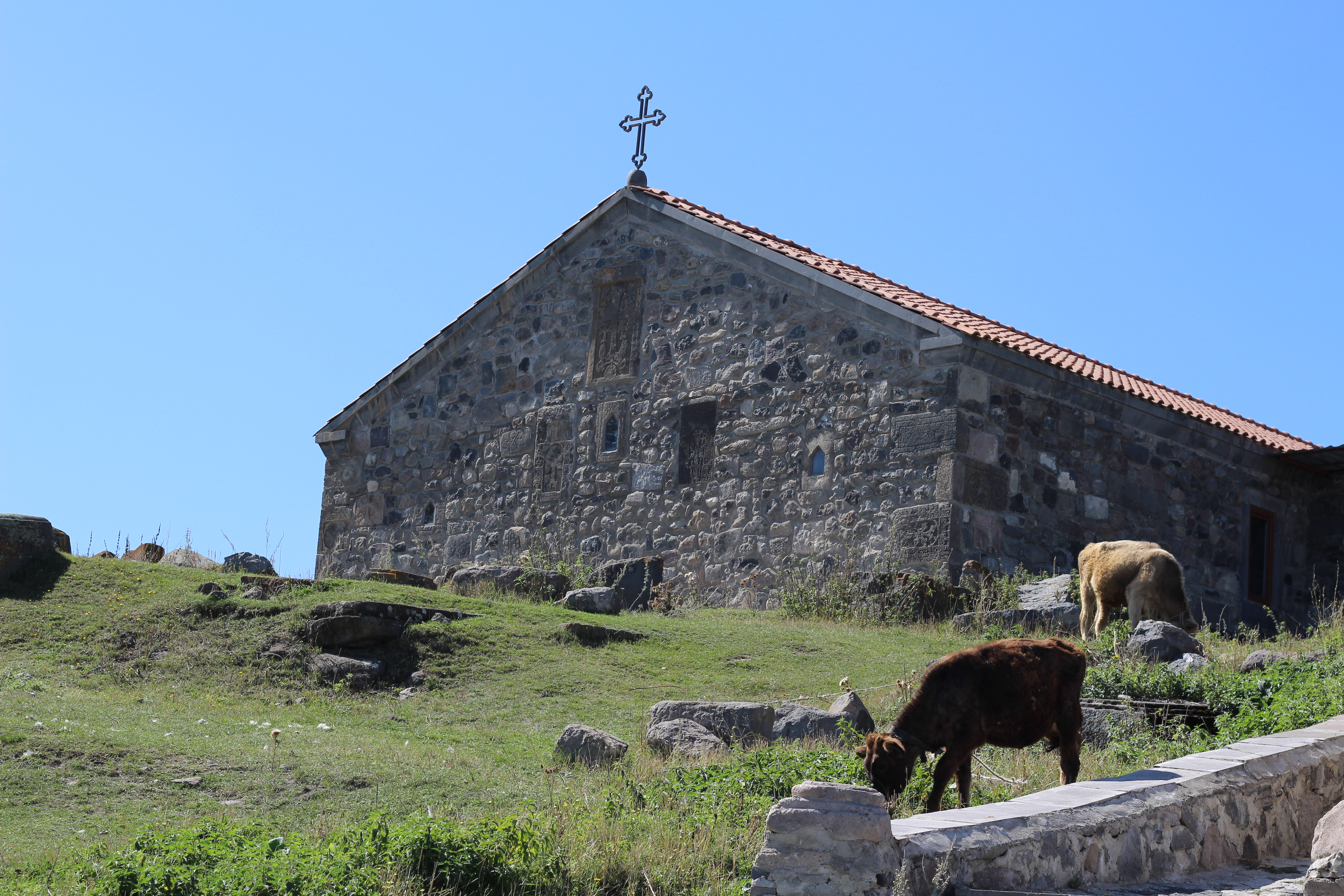
St. George's Church of Zolakar
