= Türklər, Beylagan =

Village in Beylagan District, Azerbaijan

Türklər (Turkler) is a village and municipality in the Beylagan District of Azerbaijan. It has a population of 1,250. "Turkler" means "Turks" in the Azerbaijani language.
