= Türklər, Lachin =

Village in Azerbaijan

Türklər (Turkler) is a village in the Lachin District of Azerbaijan.
