= Gyumri =

Gyumri Գյումրի
- City and urban community
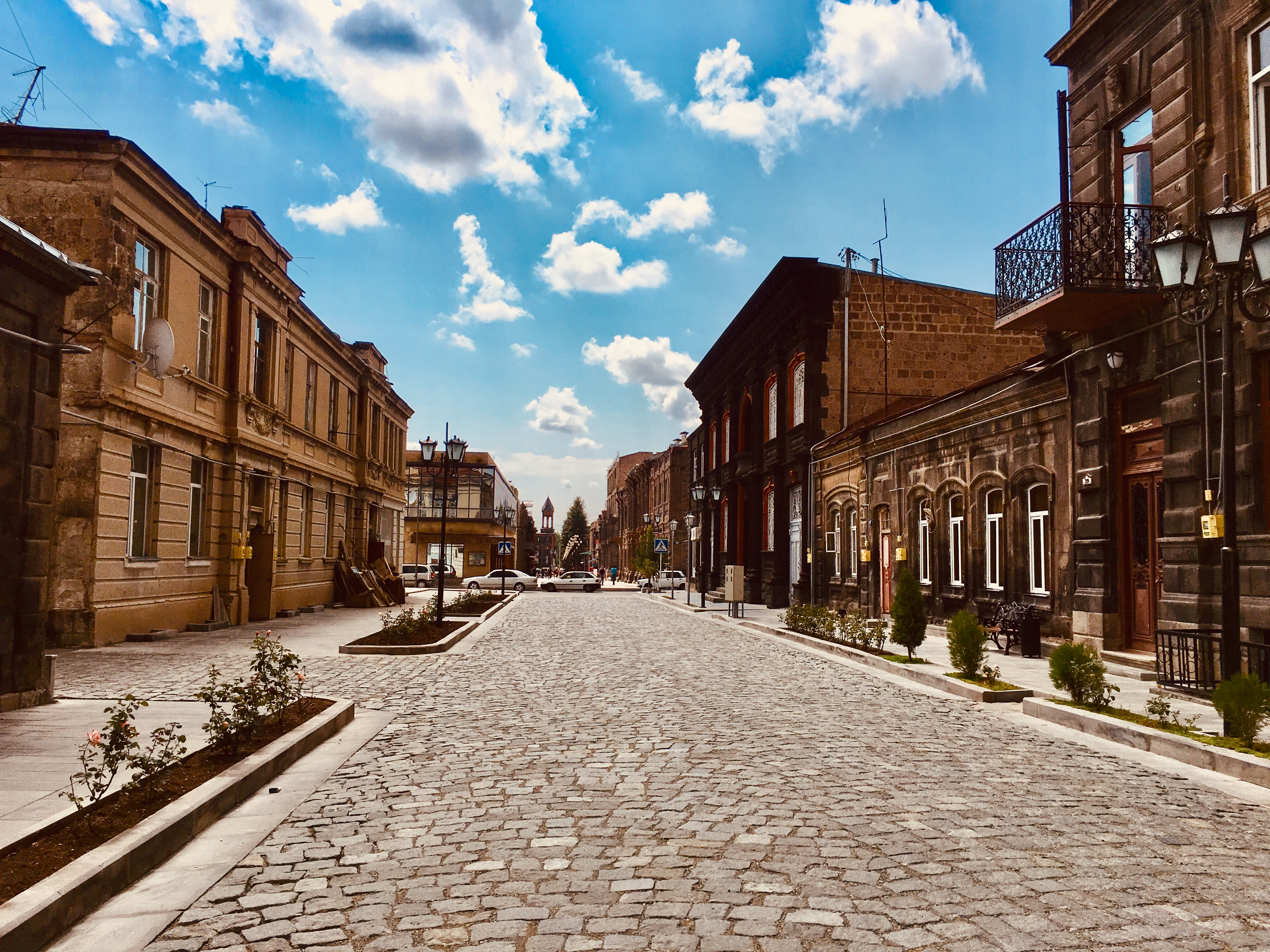
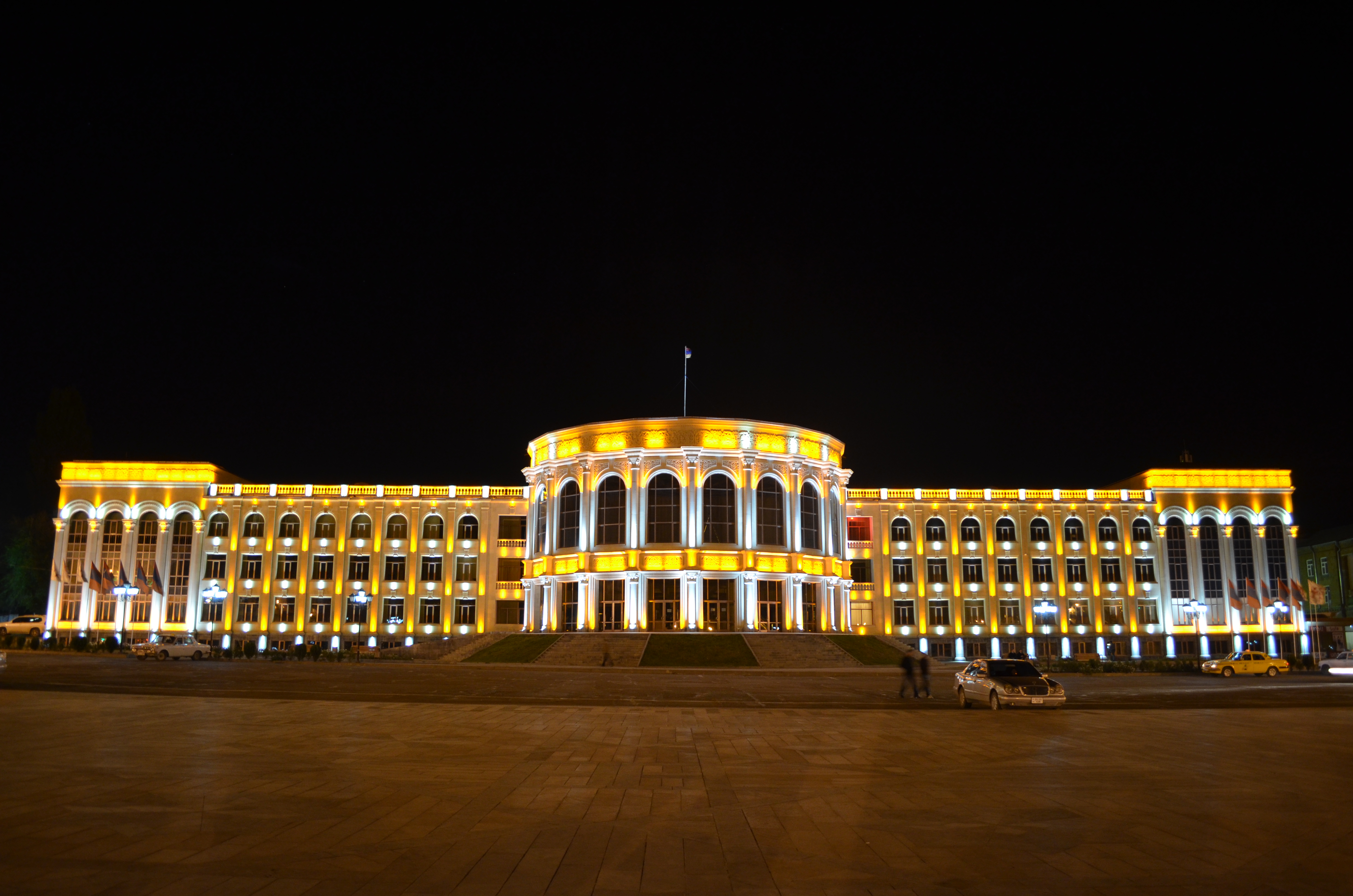
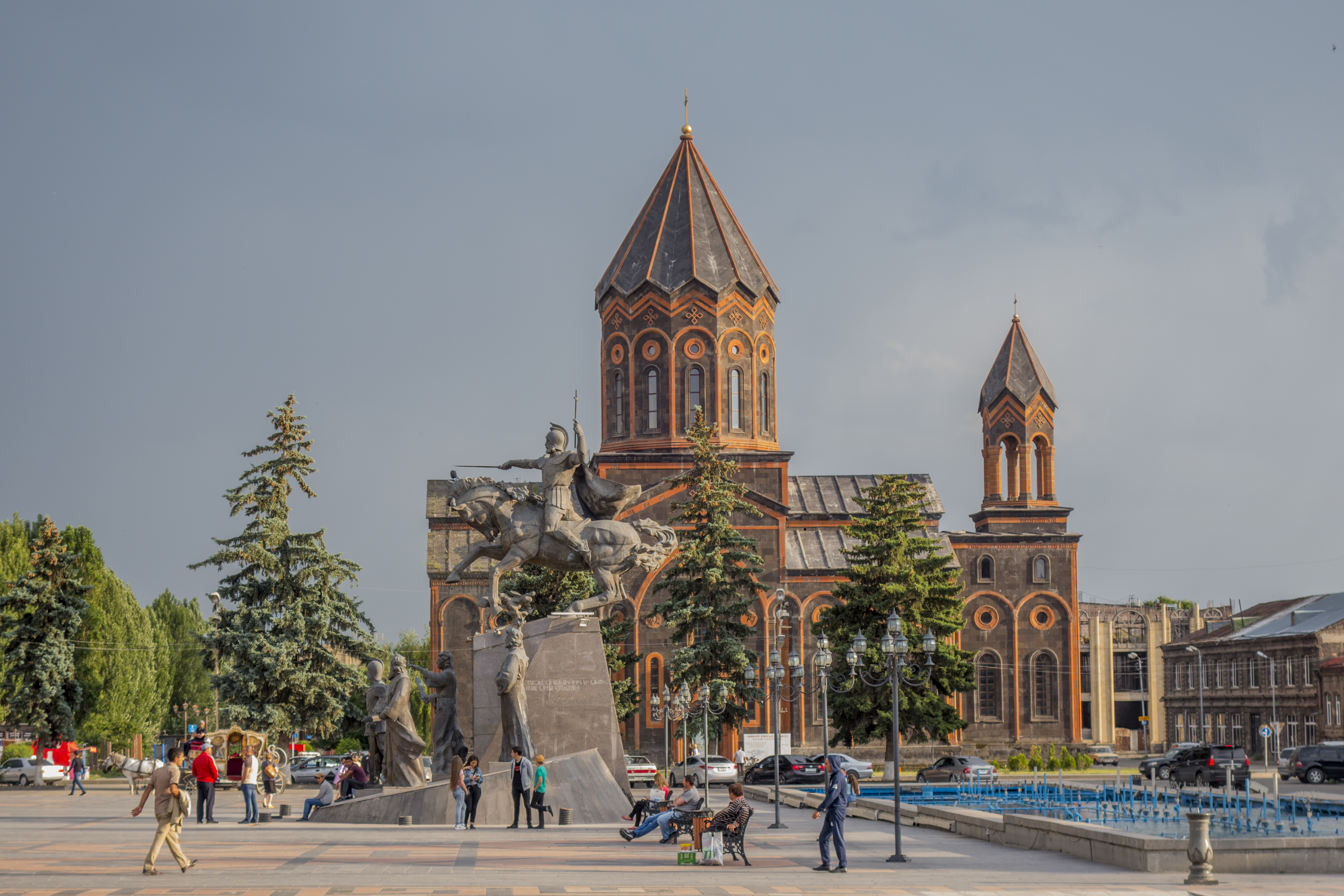
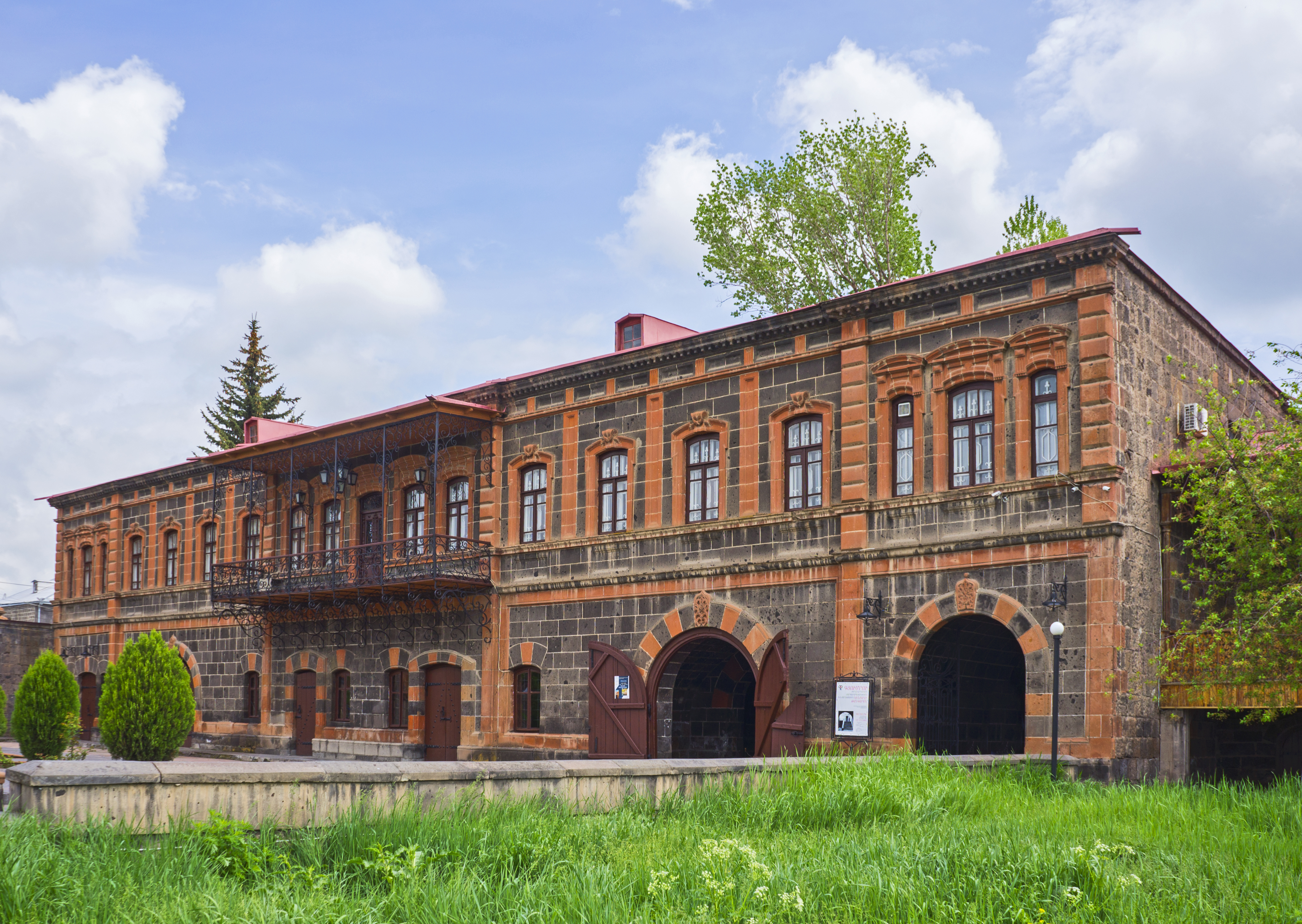
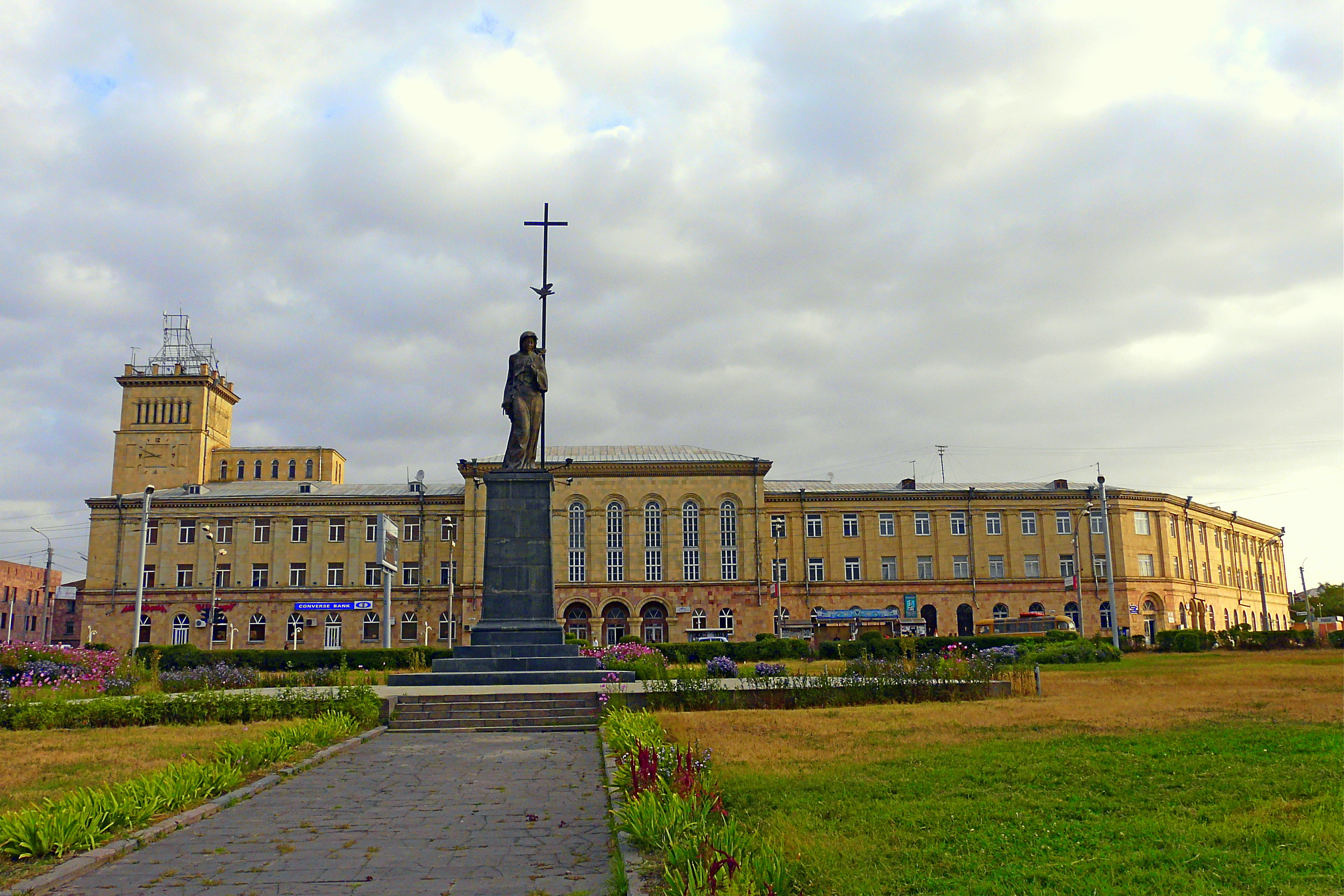
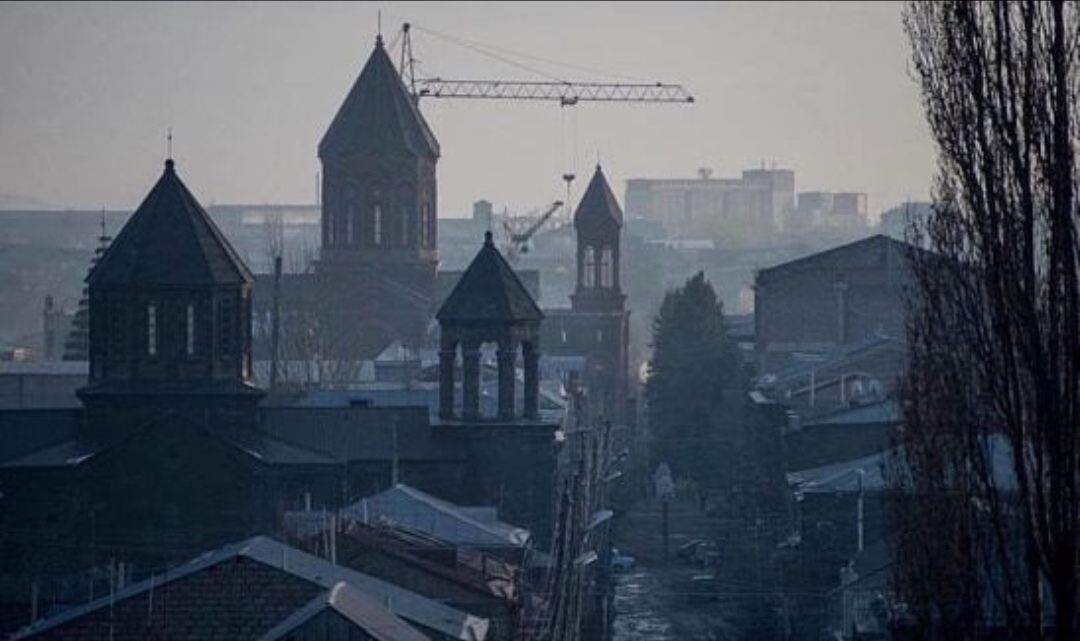
- From top down, left to right; Abovyan street view • City Hall • Cathedral of Gyumri • Dzitoghtsyan Museum of National Architecture • Independence Square • Gyumri skyline

- Flag Seal
- Nickname: Hayrakaghak ("Father-city")
- Location within Armenia Location within Shirak
- Coordinates: 40°47′22″N 43°50′51″E
- Country: Armenia
- Province: Shirak
- Founded as Kumayri by the Urartians: 8th century BC
- Rebuilt as Alexandropol by Nicholas I of Russia: 1837

Government
  - Type: Mayor–council
  - Mayor: Vardan Ghukasyan

Area
  - Total: 54 km^{2} (21 sq mi)
- Elevation: 1,509 m (4,951 ft)

Population (2022 census)
  - Total: 112,301
  - Density: 2,100/km^{2} (5,400/sq mi)
- Demonym: Gyumretsi
- Time zone: UTC+4 (AMT)
- Postal code: 3101-3126
- Area code: (+374) 312
- Vehicle registration: 45 am
- Climate: Dfb
- Website: www.gyumricity.am

Gyumri (Armenian: Գյումրի, (Note: Classical spelling: Գիւմրի) pronounced [ɡjumˈɾi]) is an urban municipal community and the second-largest city in Armenia, serving as the administrative center of Shirak Province in the northwestern part of the country. By the end of the 19th century, when the city was known as Alexandropol, (Note: Russian: Александрополь; Armenian: Ալեքսանդրապոլ) it became the largest city of Russian-ruled Eastern Armenia with a population above that of Yerevan. The city became renowned as a cultural hub, while also carrying significance as a major center of Russian troops during Russo-Turkish wars of the 19th century.

The city underwent a tumultuous period during and after World War I. While Russian forces withdrew from the South Caucasus due to the October Revolution, the city became host to large numbers of Armenian refugees fleeing the Armenian genocide, in particular hosting 22,000 orphaned children in around 170 orphanage buildings. It was renamed Leninakan (Note: Armenian: Լենինական, pronounced [lɛninɑˈkɑn]; Russian: Ленинакан, pronounced [lʲɪnʲɪnəˈkan]) during the Soviet period and became a major industrial and textile center in Soviet Armenia. The city's population rapidly grew to above 200,000 prior to the 1988 Spitak earthquake, when it was devastated, with the city's population being reduced to 121,976 as of the 2011 census. The city was renamed Gyumri under modern independent Armenia soon after the breakup of the Soviet Union, and post-earthquake reconstruction efforts continue. As of the 2022 census, the population of the city was 112,301.

Today, Gyumri continues to grapple with the lasting effects of the 1988 earthquake, but remains known as the cultural hub of Armenia due to the many artists and craftsman who originated from the city. The city is also notable for the large Kumayri historic district that managed to mostly survive the 1988 earthquake, dating back mainly to the 19th century and being one of the few surviving places in the world with authentic urban Armenian architecture.

== Name ==
The area of modern-day Gyumri was originally known as Kumayri (Armenian: Կումայրի) during the period of the Kingdom of Urartu. Over time, the name became disrupted through phonetic changes to Kumri, then Gumri, and finally Gyumri. In 1837, Gyumri was renamed Alexandropol after Czar Nicholas I's wife, Princess Alexandra Fyodorovna. Between 1924 and 1990, the city was known as Leninakan in honor of Vladimir Lenin. Following independence, the original name Kumayri was used until 1992, when Gyumri was chosen as the name of the city.

== History ==
=== Classical antiquity and the ancient Armenian Kingdom ===
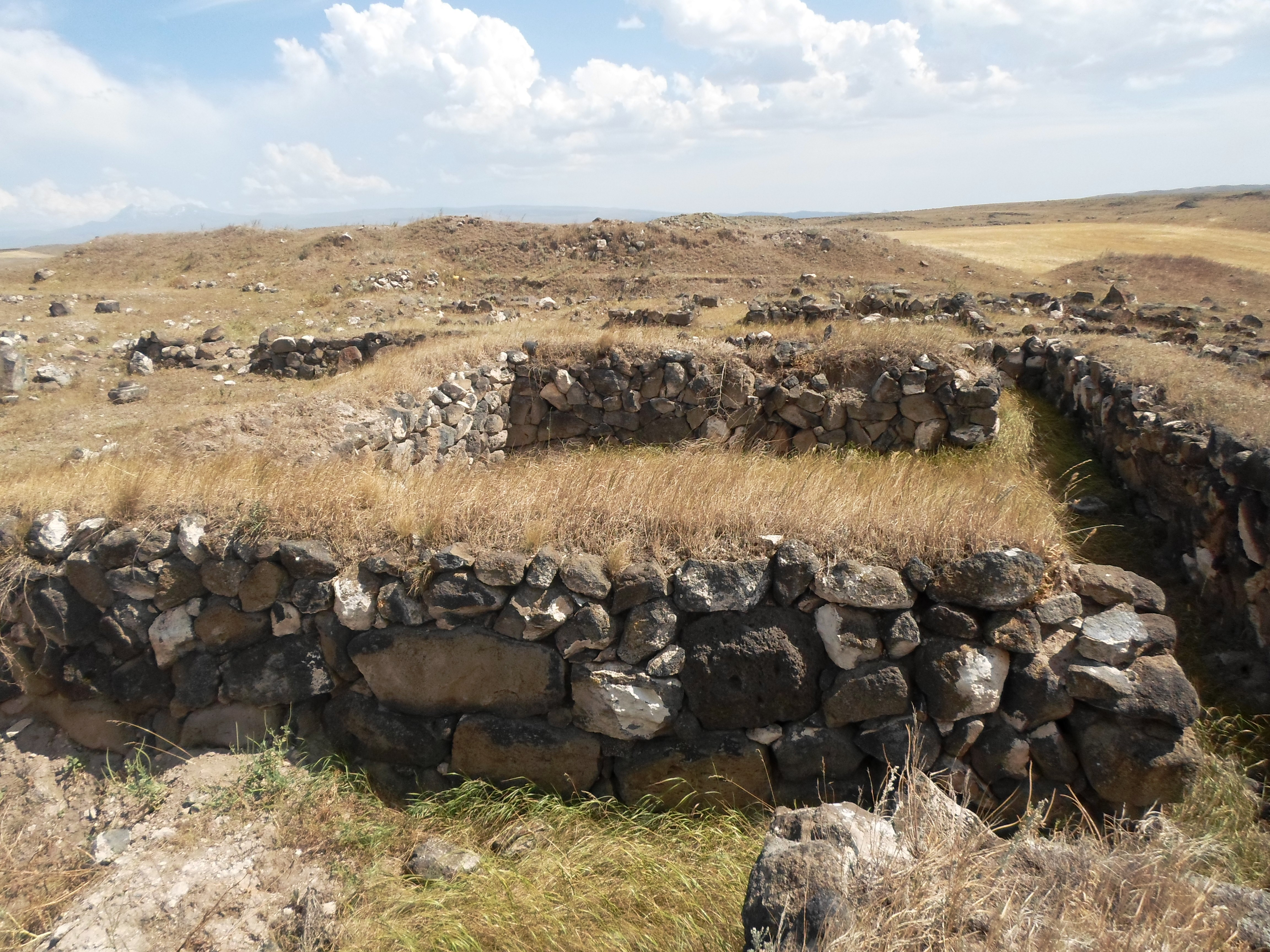
The Orontid settlement of Kumayri, 5th–2nd centuries BC

Historical affiliations

Urartu 832 BC–590 BC
Satrapy of Armenia 550 BC–321 BC
Kingdom of Armenia 321 BC–428 AD
Armenian Marzbanate 428–646
Arminiya 654–884
Bagratid Armenia 884–1024
Kingdom of Georgia 1024–1071
Seljuk Empire 1071–1100s
Mongol Empire 1240s–1330s
Kara Koyunlu 1360–1380s
Timurid Empire 1380s–1430s
Aq Qoyunlu 1430s–1500s
Safavid Empire 1555–1812
Russian Empire 1813–1918
Republic of Armenia 1918–1920
Turkey 1921
Soviet Union 1922–1990
Armenia 1991–Present

Archaeological excavations conducted throughout the Soviet period have shown that the area of modern-day Gyumri has been populated since at least the third millennium BC. The area was mentioned as Kumayri in the historic Urartian inscriptions dating back to the 8th century BC. Kumayri may be identical with the city of Gymnias or Gumnias (Γυμνιάς in greek) mentioned by Xenophon in his Anabasis.

At the decline of the Urartu Kingdom by the second half of the 6th century BC, Kumayri became part of the Achaemenid Empire. The remains of a royal settlement found just to the south of Gyumri near the village of Beniamin dating back to the 5th to 2nd centuries BC, are a great example of the Achemenid influence in the region. However, at the beginning of the 5th century BC, Kumayri became part of the Satrapy of Armenia under the rule of the Orontids. An alternative theory suggests that Kumayri has been formed as an urban settlement in the late 5th century BC, ca. 401 BC, by Greek colonists.

Later in 331 BC, the entire territory was included in the Ayrarat province of Ancient Armenian Kingdom as part of the Shirak canton. Between 190 BC and 1 AD Kumayri was under the rule of the Artaxiad dynasty of Armenia. During the 1st century AD, Shirak was granted to the Kamsarakan family, who ruled over Kumayri during the Arsacid Kingdom of Armenia.

=== Medieval period ===
Following the partition of Armenia in 387 between the Byzantines and the Persians, and as a result of the fall of the Arsacid Kingdom of Armenia in 428, Shirak including Kumayri became part of the Sasanian Empire of Persia. In 658 AD, at the height of the Arab Islamic invasions, Kumayri was conquered during the Muslim conquest of Persia to become part of the Emirate of Armenia under the Umayyad Caliphate.

Kumayri was a significant and quite-developed urban settlement during the Middle Ages. According to the Armenian scholar Ghevond the Historian, the town was a center of the Armenian rebellion led by Artavazd Mamikonian against the Islamic Arab Caliphate, between 733 and 755. After 2 centuries of Islamic rule over Armenia, the Bagratids declared independence in 885 establishing the Bagratid Kingdom of Armenia. Kumayri entered e new era of growth and progress, particularly when the nearby city of Ani became the capital of the kingdom in 961. By the second half of the 10th century, Kumayri was under the influence of the Armenian Pahlavuni family, who were descendants of the Kamsarakans. The Pahlavunis had a great contribution in the progress of Shirak with the foundation of many fortresses, monastic complexes, educational institutions, etc.

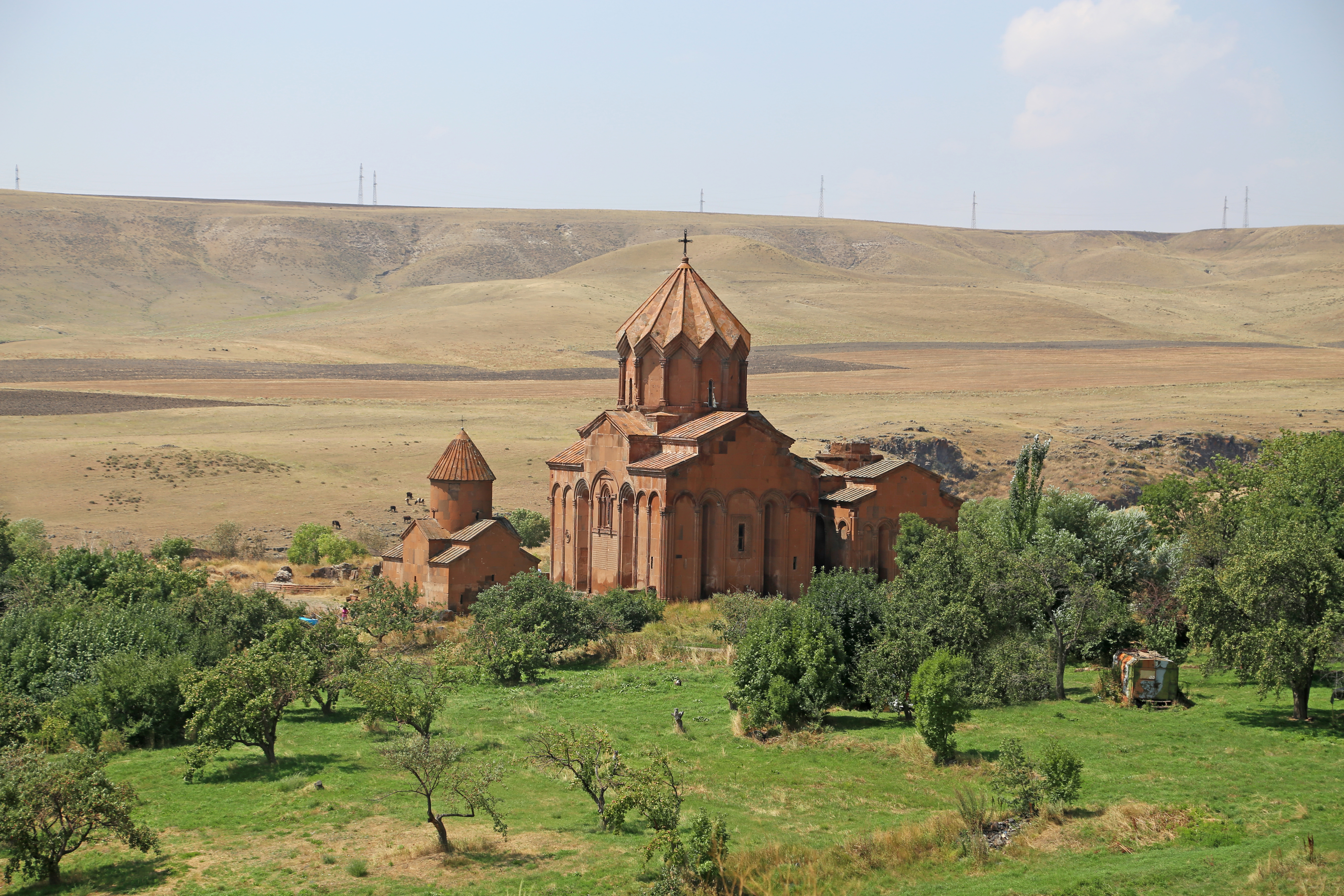
Marmashen Monastery 6 kilometres (3.7 miles) northwest of Gyumri (10th century)

After the fall of Armenia to the Byzantine Empire in 1045 and later to the Seljuk invaders in 1064. Under the foreign rulers, the town had gradually lost its significance during the following centuries, until the establishment of the Zakarid Principality of Armenia in 1201 under the Georgian protectorate. During the Zakarid rule, the Eastern Armenian territories, mainly Lori and Shirak, entered into a new period of growth and stability, becoming a trade center between the east and the west. After the Mongols captured Ani in 1236, Armenia turned into a Mongol protectorate as part of the Ilkhanate, and the Zakarids became vassals to the Mongols. After the fall of the Ilkhanate in the mid-14th century, the Zakarid princes ruled over Lori, Shirak, and Ararat plain until 1360 when they fell to the invading Turkic tribes.

By the last quarter of the 14th century, the Ag Qoyunlu Sunni Oghuz Turkic tribe took over Armenia, including Shirak. In 1400, Timur invaded Armenia and Georgia, and captured more than 60,000 of the survived local people as slaves. Many districts including Shirak were depopulated. In 1410, Armenia fell under the control of the Kara Koyunlu Shia Oghuz Turkic tribe. According to the Armenian historian Thomas of Metsoph, although the Kara Koyunlu levied heavy taxes against the Armenians, the early years of their rule were relatively peaceful and some reconstruction of towns took place.

=== Persian and Russian rules ===
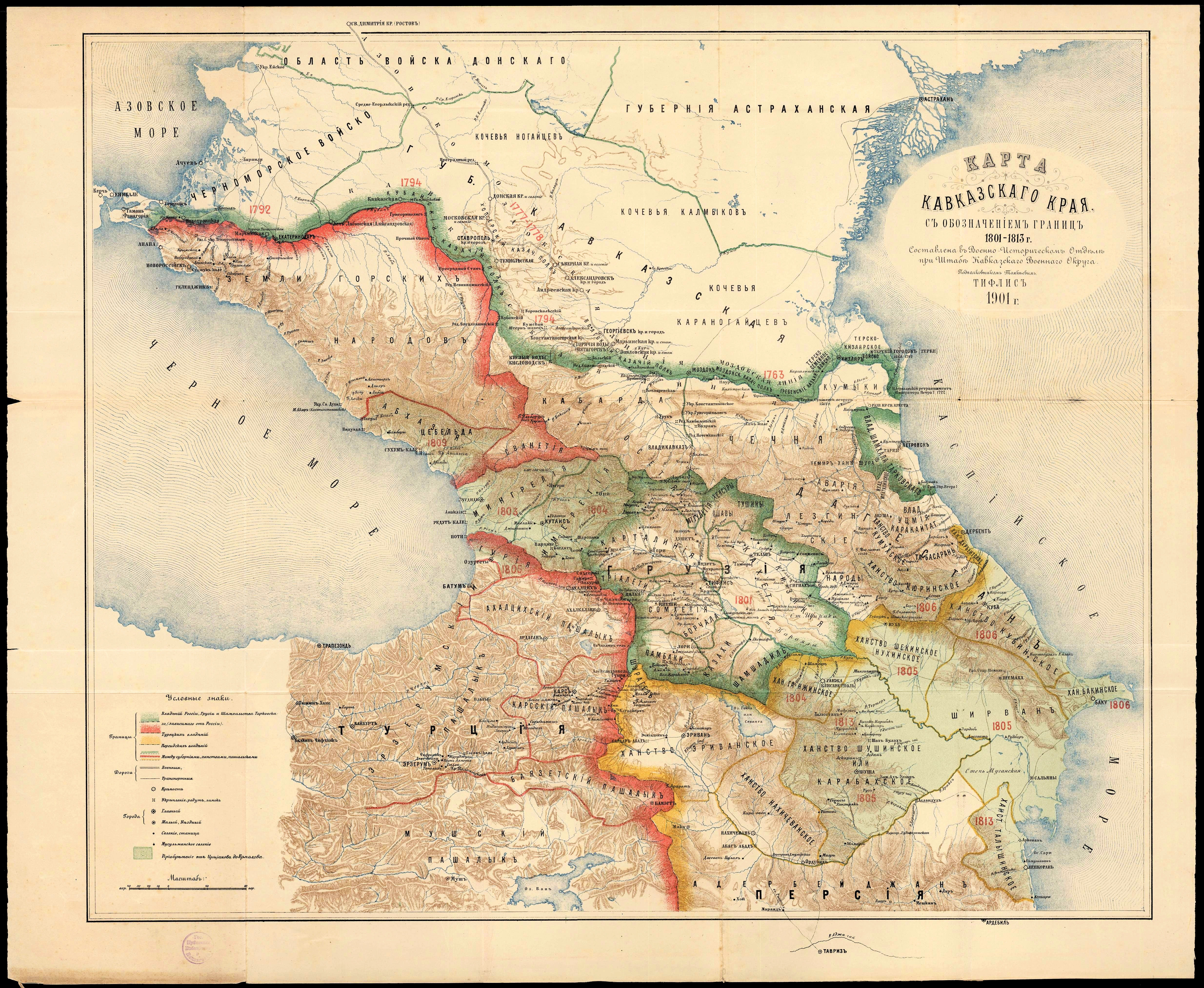

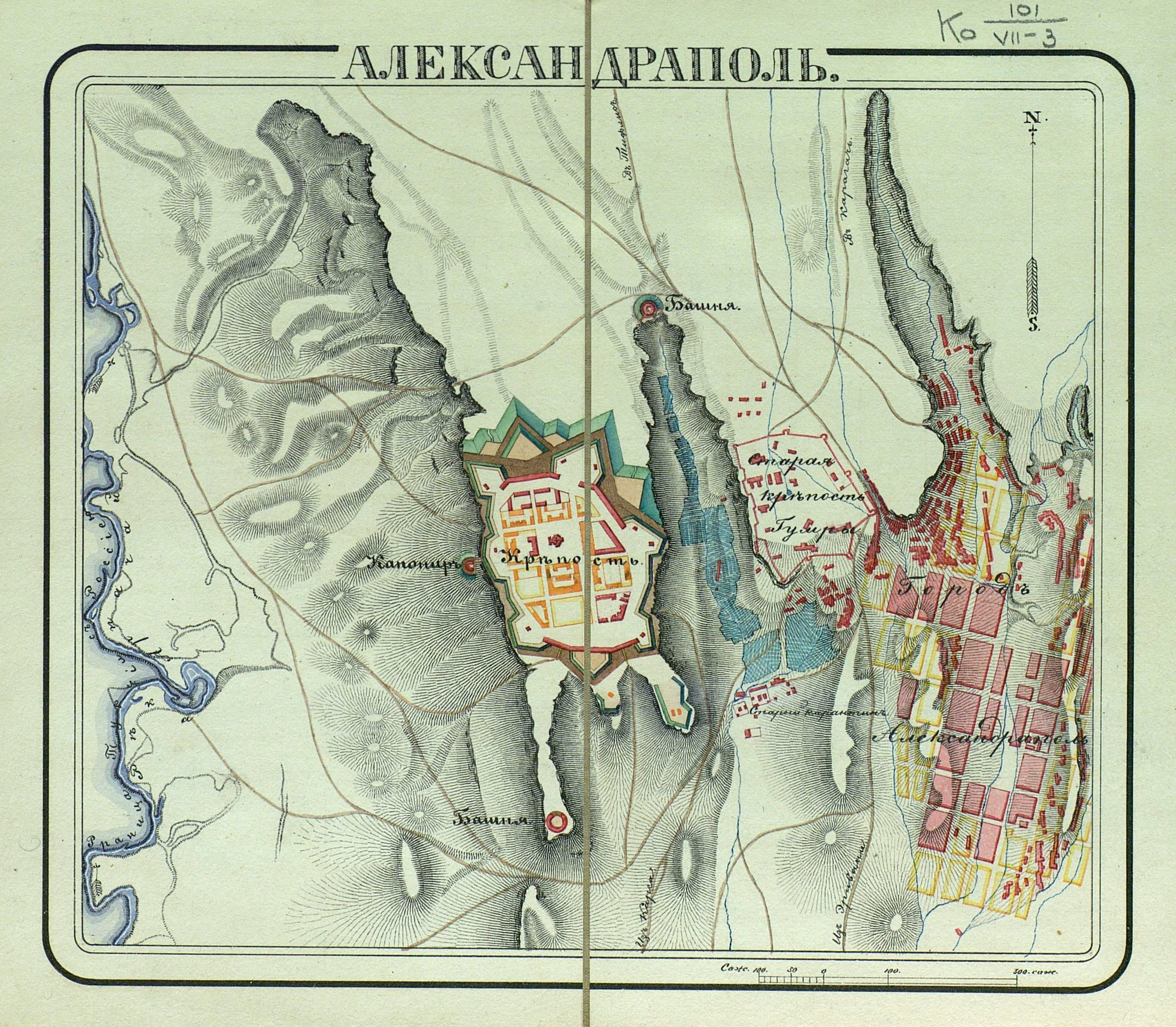

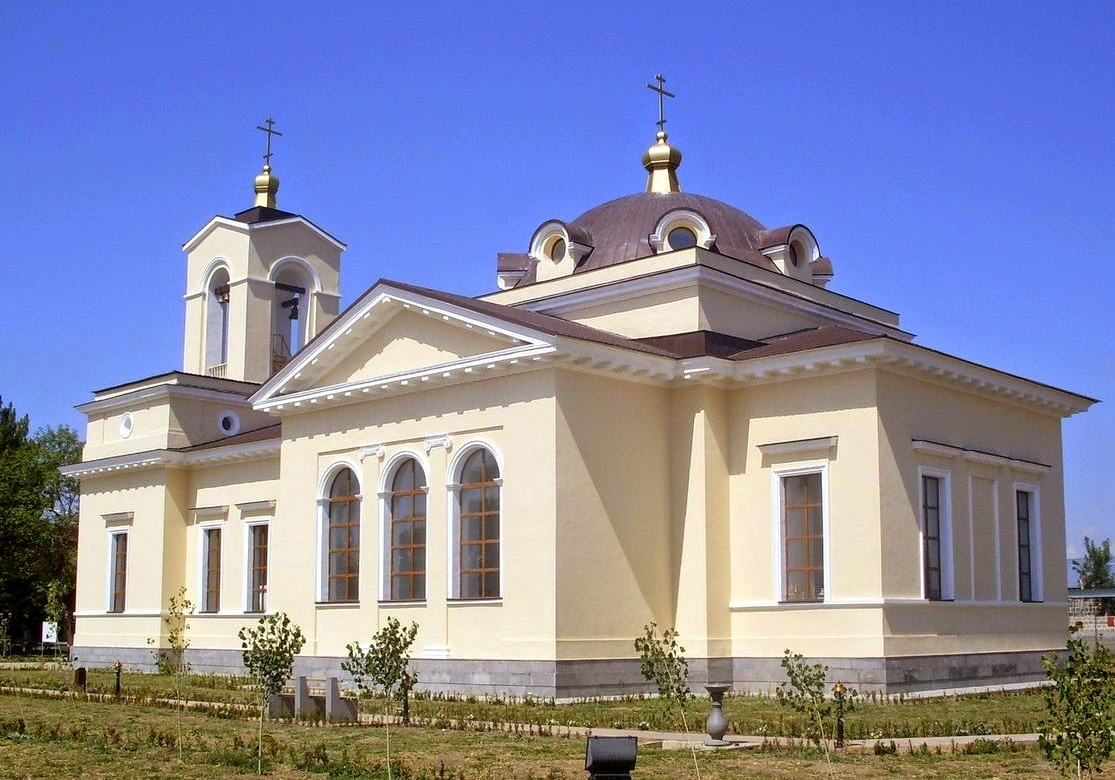
Saint Alexandra the Martyr's Russian Orthodox church, built in 1837–42

In 1501, most of the Eastern Armenian territories including Kumayri were conquered by the emerging Safavid dynasty of Iran led by Shah Ismail I. Soon after in 1502, Kumayri became part of the newly formed Erivan Beglarbegi, a new administrative territory of Iran formed by the Safavids. During the first half of the 18th century, Kumayri became part of the Erivan Khanate under the rule of the Afsharid dynasty and later under the Qajar dynasty of Persia.

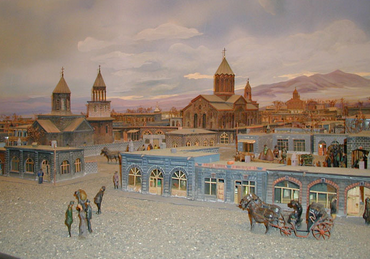
Diorama of old Alexandropol with the Holy Saviour's Church (1859–1873)

In June 1804, the Russian forces controlled over Shirak region at the beginning of the Russo-Persian War of 1804 and 1813. Kumayri became officially part of the Russian Empire at the Treaty of Gulistan signed on 1 January 1813 between Imperial Russia and Qajar Persia.

During the period of Russian rule, Gyumri became one of the developing cities in the Transcaucasus. In 1829, in the aftermath of the Russo-Turkish War, there was a big influx of Armenian population, as around 3,000 families who had migrated from territories in the Ottoman Empire, in particular from the towns of Kars, Erzurum, and Doğubeyazıt- settled in and around Gyumri. The Russian poet Alexander Pushkin visited Gyumri during his journey to Erzurum in 1829.

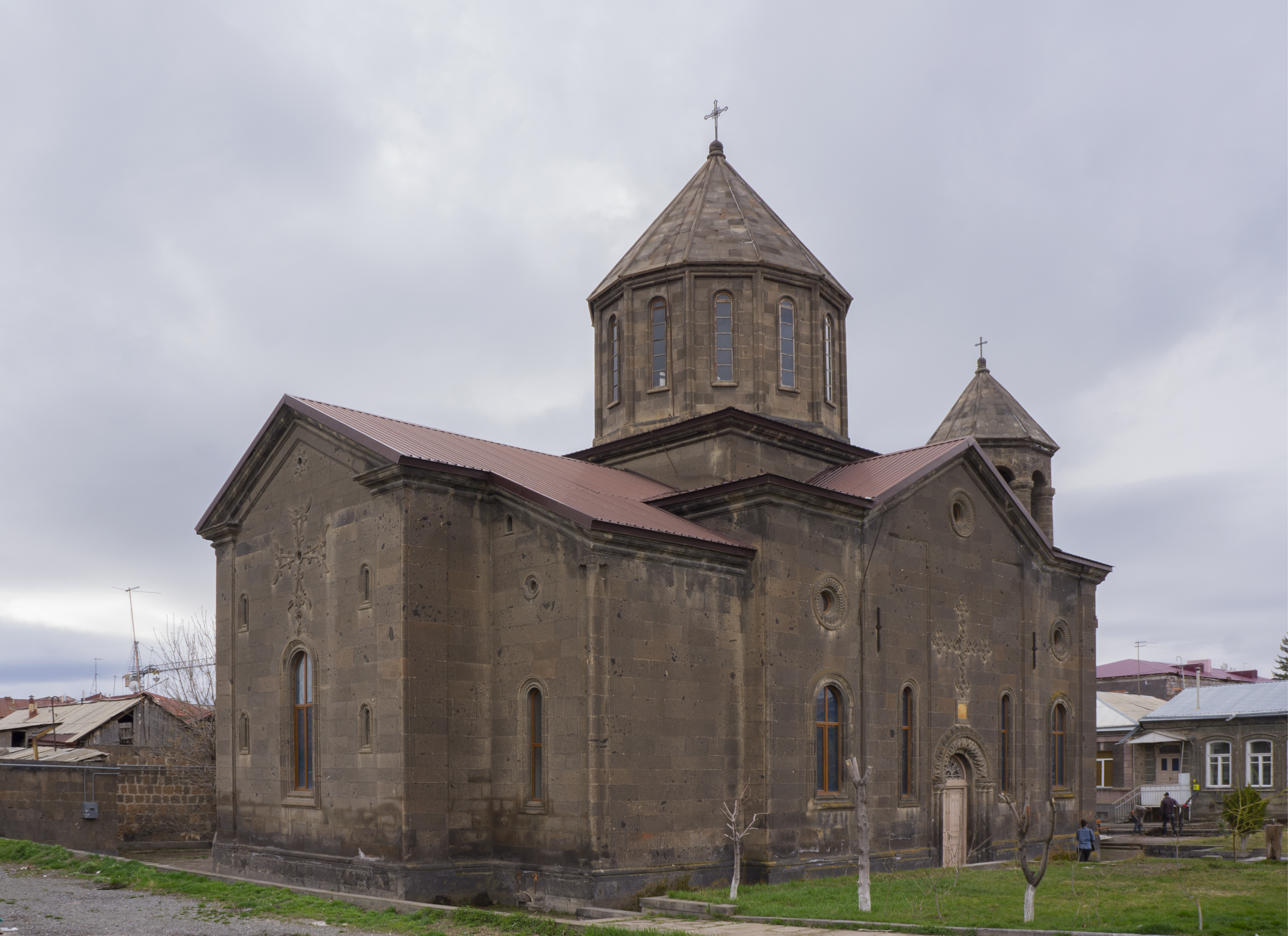
Surb Nshan Church of 1870

In 1837 Russian Tsar Nicholas I arrived in Gyumri and changed the name into Alexandropol. The name was chosen in honour of Tsar Nicholas I's wife, Princess Charlotte of Prussia, who had changed her name to Alexandra Fyodorovna after converting to Orthodox Christianity.

A major Russian fortress was built on the site in 1837. Alexandropol was finally formed as a town in 1840 to become the center of the newly established Alexandropol Uyezd, experiencing rapid growth during its first decade. In 1849, the Alexandropol Uyezd became part of the Erivan Governorate. The town was an important outpost for the Imperial Russian armed forces in the Transcaucasus where their military barracks were established (e.g., at Poligons, Severski, Kazachi Post). The Russians built the Sev Berd fortress at the western edge of the city during the 1830s in response to the Russo-Turkish War of 1828–1829.

Alexandropol had been quickly transformed to become one of the major centers of the Russian troops during the Russo-Turkish War of 1877–78. After the establishment of the railway station in 1899, Alexandropol witnessed significant growth and became the largest city in Eastern Armenia. By the end of the 19th century, Alexandropol was home to 430 shopping stores, several workshops, cultural institutions, a girl's gymnasium, a commercial school, a theater, and leather, bear, and soap enterprises.

=== Modern history ===
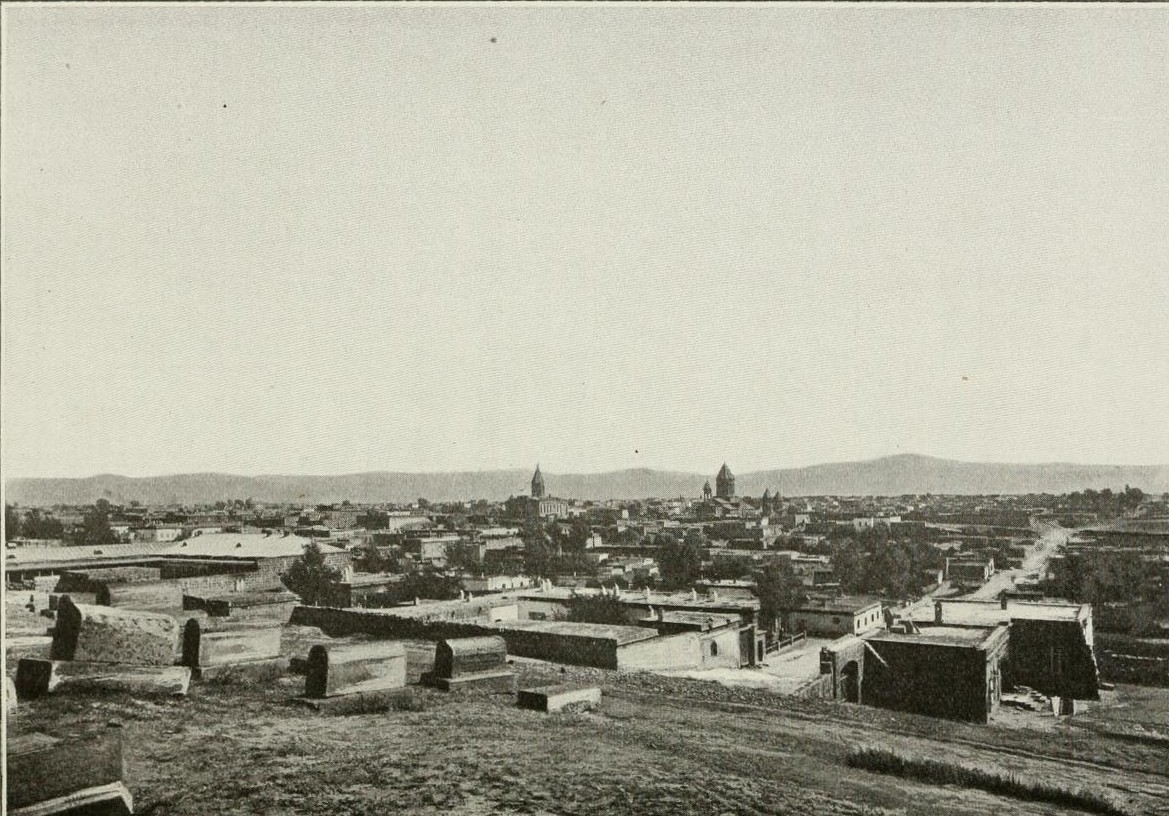
Alexandropol in 1901

In 1902, the first bank in the city was opened. Until the Sovietization of Armenia in 1920, Alexandropol had 31 manufacturing centers including beer, soap, textile, etc. After the October Revolution of 1917 and the Russian withdrawal from the South Caucasus, the Ottoman forces launched a new offensive capturing the city of Alexandropol on 11 May 1918, during the Caucasus Campaign in World War I. However, the Ottomans withdrew from the city on 24 December 1918, as stipulated by the Armistice of Mudros. On 6 December 1918, the Armenian army reoccupied the city.

The newly established Republic of Armenia proclaimed on 28 May 1918, included the city of Alexandropol. On 10 May 1920, the local Bolshevik Armenians aided by the Muslim population, attempted a coup d'état in Alexandropol against the Dashnak government of Armenia. The uprising was suppressed by the Armenian government on May 14 and its leaders were executed. However, during another Turkish invasion, Turkish troops attacked Alexandropol and occupied the city on 7 November 1920. Armenia was forced to sign the Treaty of Alexandropol on December 3 to stop the Turkish advance towards Yerevan, however a concurrent Soviet invasion led to the fall of the Armenian government on December 2. The Turkish forces withdrew from Alexandropol after the Treaty of Kars was signed in October 1921 by the unrecognized Soviet and Turkish governments.

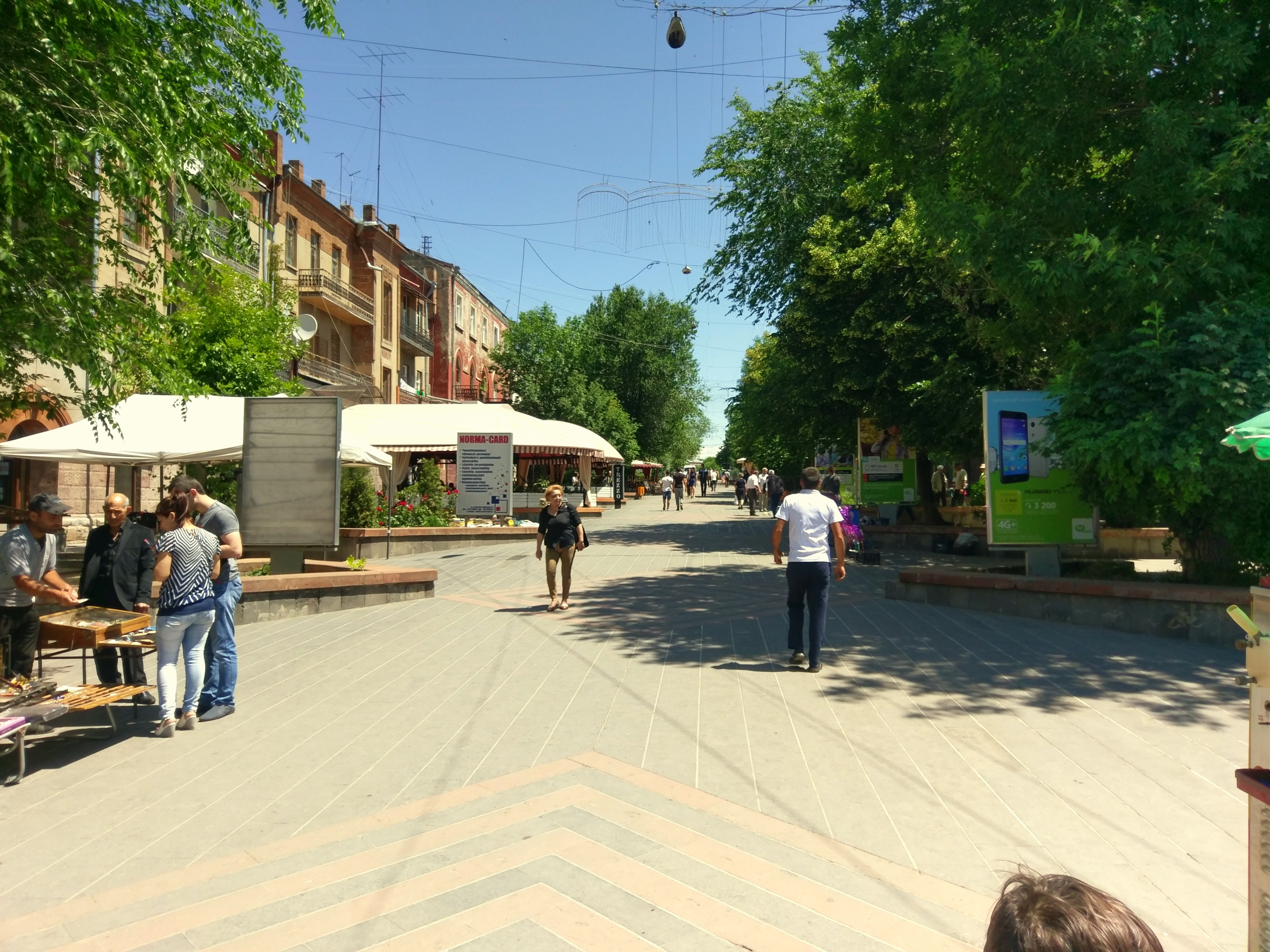
Rizhkov Street in central Gyumri

Under Soviet rule, the name of the city was changed in 1924 to Leninakan after the deceased Soviet leader Vladimir Lenin. The city suffered an earthquake in 1926, when many of its significant buildings were destroyed including the Greek church of Saint George.

Leninakan became a major industrial center in the Armenian Soviet Socialist Republic and its second-largest city, after the capital Yerevan. The city suffered major damage during the 1988 Armenian earthquake, which devastated many parts of the country. The earthquake occurred along a known thrust fault with a length of 60 kilometers (37 mi). Its strike was parallel to the Caucasus range and dipped to the north-northeast. Bruce Bolt, a seismologist and a professor of earth and planetary science at the University of California, Berkeley, walked the fault scarp in 1992 and found that the vertical displacement measured 1 m (3 ft 3 in) along most of the length with the southwest end reaching 1.6 m (5 ft 3 in).

The earthquake had a disastrous impact on the city, as many buildings are still not recovered. As of 2014, according to some news websites, between 4,000 and 5,000 residents of Gyumri remain homeless, although there are no official figures provided by the local authorities of the city.

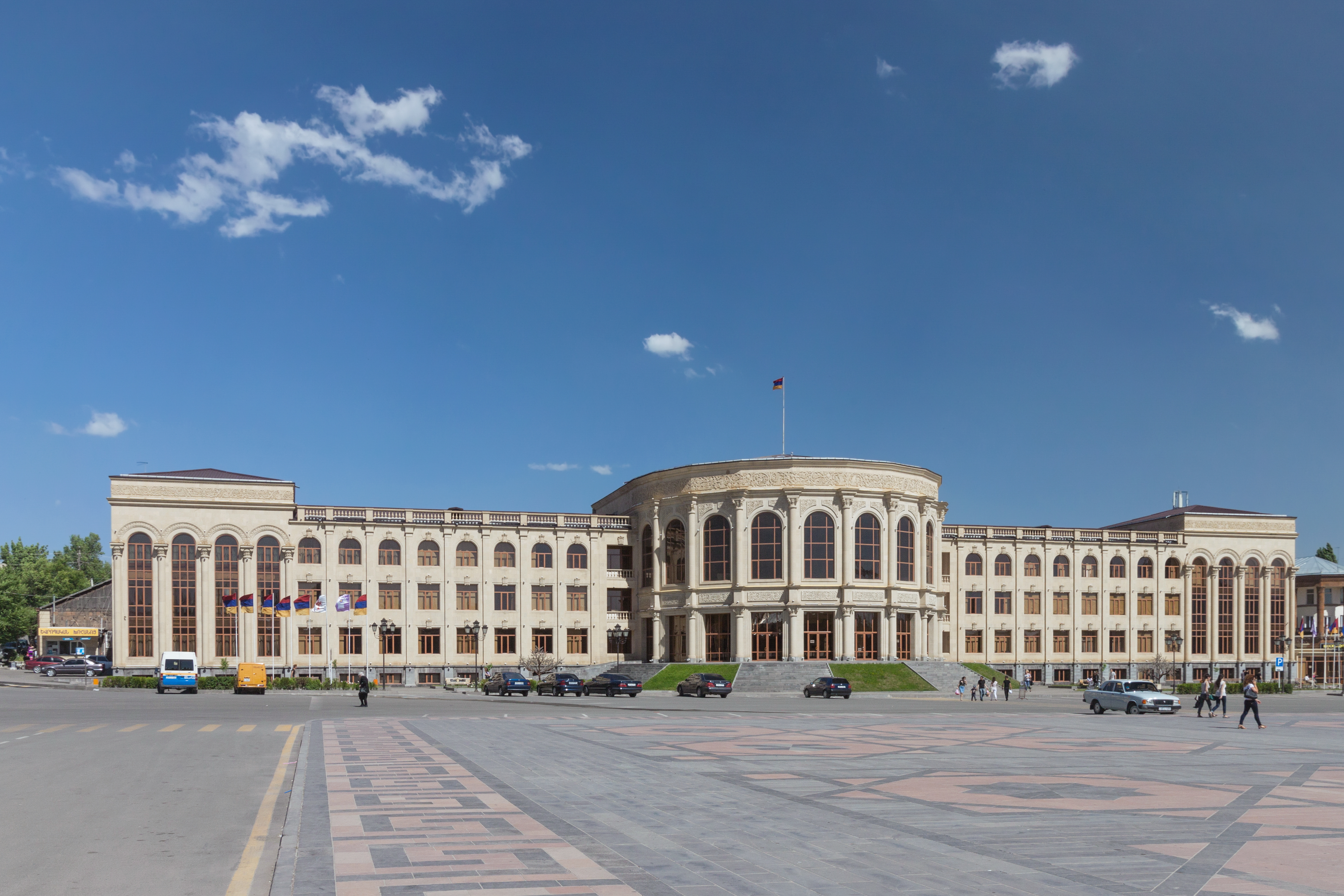
Gyumri City Hall at Vardanants Square

At the time of the breakup of the Soviet Union, the city was renamed Kumayri from 1990 until 1992 when it was finally given the name Gyumri. The Russian 102nd Military Base is located in the city.

Gyumri was celebrated as the Capital of Culture of the Commonwealth of Independent States for 2013. Major events took place in the city on 30 June 2013.

On 12 January 2015, Valery Permyakov, a serviceman from the Russian 102nd Military Base, murdered seven members of an Armenian family in Gyumri.

On 25 June 2016, Pope Francis delivered a Holy Mass at Gyumri's Vartanants Square. Catholicos of All Armenians Garegin II also took part in the ceremony.

== Geography and climate ==
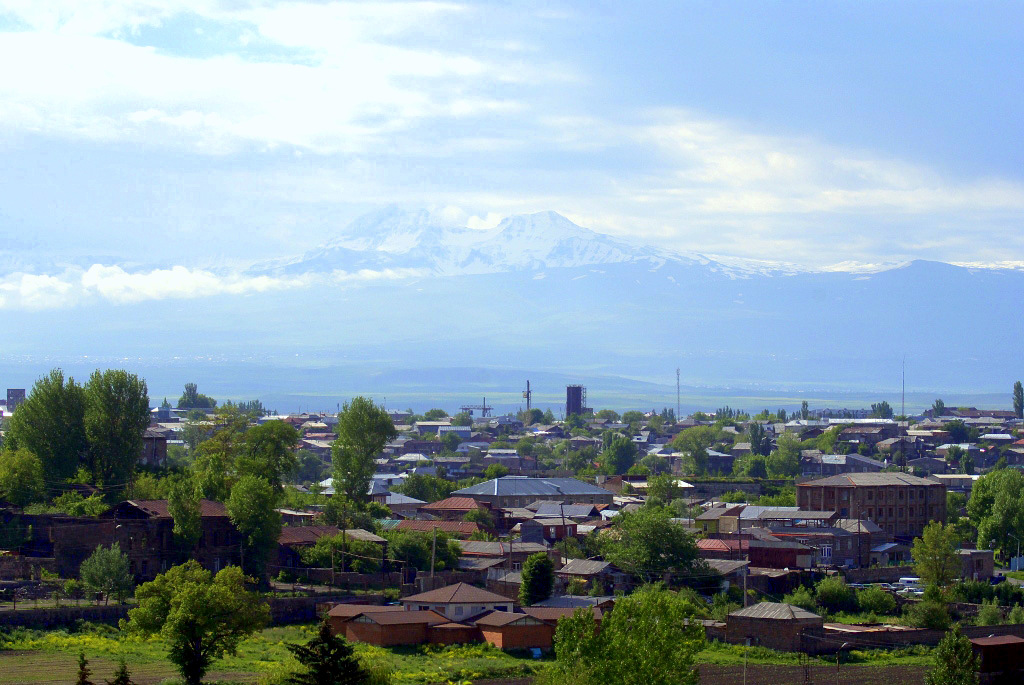
Gyumri with Mount Aragats in the background

Gyumri is 126 kilometres (78 miles) north of the capital Yerevan at the central part of the Shirak plateau. It has an approximate height of 1,550 metres (5,090 feet) above sea level, the high altitude line being 1,500 metres (4,900 feet). The Akhurian River passes through the western suburbs. The Shirak plateau is surrounded with the Pambak Mountains from the east and Aragats volcanic range from the south. The city of Gyumri is 196 kilometres (122 miles) away from the Black Sea. The surrounding lands near the city are rich in tufa, basalt and clay.

Gyumri has a humid continental climate (Köppen Dfb), characterized by freezing and snowy winters and warm summers. The annual precipitation averages 510 millimetres (20 inches).

Climate data for Gyumri, 1,523 metres (5,000 ft) asl (1991-2020 normals)
Month	Jan	Feb	Mar	Apr	May	Jun	Jul	Aug	Sep	Oct	Nov	Dec	Year
Record high °C (°F)	10.4 (50.7)	14.0 (57.2)	21.5 (70.7)	32.4 (90.3)	32.9 (91.2)	33.5 (92.3)	38.0 (100.4)	38.2 (100.8)	35.8 (96.4)	30.3 (86.5)	22.9 (73.2)	17.6 (63.7)	38.2 (100.8)
Mean daily maximum °C (°F)	−2.7 (27.1)	−1.5 (29.3)	4.6 (40.3)	14.0 (57.2)	17.9 (64.2)	22.8 (73.0)	27.1 (80.8)	26.7 (80.1)	24.0 (75.2)	15.7 (60.3)	7.2 (45.0)	−0.2 (31.6)	13.0 (55.3)
Daily mean °C (°F)	−7.8 (18.0)	−6.3 (20.7)	−0.7 (30.7)	7.2 (45.0)	12.0 (53.6)	16.7 (62.1)	20.3 (68.5)	20.6 (69.1)	16.1 (61.0)	9.8 (49.6)	2.0 (35.6)	−4.8 (23.4)	7.2 (45.0)
Mean daily minimum °C (°F)	−13.6 (7.5)	−12 (10)	−6.2 (20.8)	0.8 (33.4)	5.0 (41.0)	8.9 (48.0)	12.9 (55.2)	12.1 (53.8)	7.5 (45.5)	1.6 (34.9)	−3.2 (26.2)	−9.3 (15.3)	0.4 (32.6)
Record low °C (°F)	−41 (−42)	−35 (−31)	−30.1 (−22.2)	−16 (3)	−7.6 (18.3)	−3.6 (25.5)	0.3 (32.5)	−1.1 (30.0)	−4.1 (24.6)	−14.6 (5.7)	−23.8 (−10.8)	−31.2 (−24.2)	−41 (−42)
Average precipitation mm (inches)	23.4 (0.92)	20.9 (0.82)	32.7 (1.29)	61.8 (2.43)	89.1 (3.51)	66.8 (2.63)	52.1 (2.05)	38.3 (1.51)	30.0 (1.18)	42.6 (1.68)	28.1 (1.11)	24.6 (0.97)	510.4 (20.1)
Average precipitation days (≥ 1.0 mm)	5.5	5.1	7.1	10.7	13.4	10	7.1	6.2	5.2	6.3	4.9	6	87.5
Average relative humidity (%)	83.3	80.4	73.1	67.9	68.8	65	62.4	59.6	61.3	68.6	74.7	82.6	70.6
Mean monthly sunshine hours	98.4	112	146.9	155.4	208.1	293.6	344.6	319	271.5	196.4	148.4	100.7	2,395
Source 1: NOAA Météo climat stats (Average max, min 1981-2010)
Source 2: Climatebase.ru

== Demographics ==
=== Population ===
The population of Gyumri has gradually grown since 1840 after gaining the status of town. A huge decline of the population was due to the disastrous earthquake of 1988. The dialect of Gyumri is a variant of Karin dialect, closely related to Western Armenian, as many Armenian genocide survivors migrated to Alexandropol.

Historical population and ethnic composition of Gyumri
Year	Armenians		Russians		Others		TOTAL
1829							600
1830							4,000
1831	3,194	92.7%	—		250	7.3%	3,444
1850							15,000
1873	19,129	95.8%			847	4.2%	19,976
1886	22,921	94.6%			1,309	5.4%	24,230
1897	21,771	71.1%	5,157	16.8%	3,668	12.1%	30,616
1908							33,723
1914							51,316
1916	45,646	88.0%	3,306	6.4%	2,146	4.1%	51,874
1919							51,000
1922	43,658	97.8%			998	2.2%	44,656
1923							58,600
1926	37,520	88.7%	3,634	8.6%	1,159	2.7%	42,313
1931	50,483	95.1%			2,592	4.9%	53,075
1939	62,159	91.8%	4,249	6.3%	1,321	1.9%	67,729
1959	100,960	93.1%	5,630	5.2%	1,856	1.7%	108,446
1970							164,966
1984							222,000
1989							122,587
2001							150,917
2011							121,976
2022							112,301

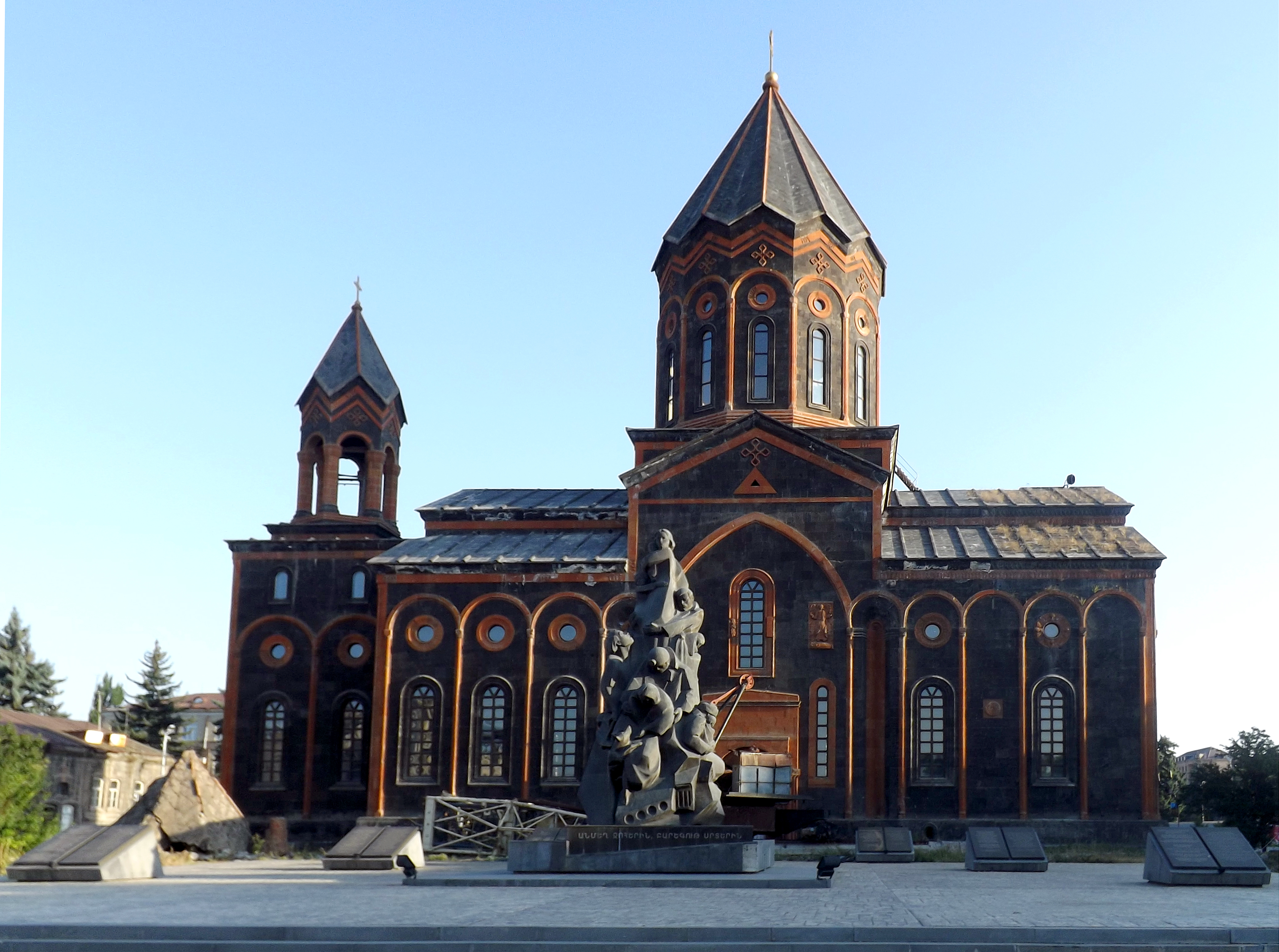
Church of the Holy Saviour being reconstructed after the 1988 earthquake

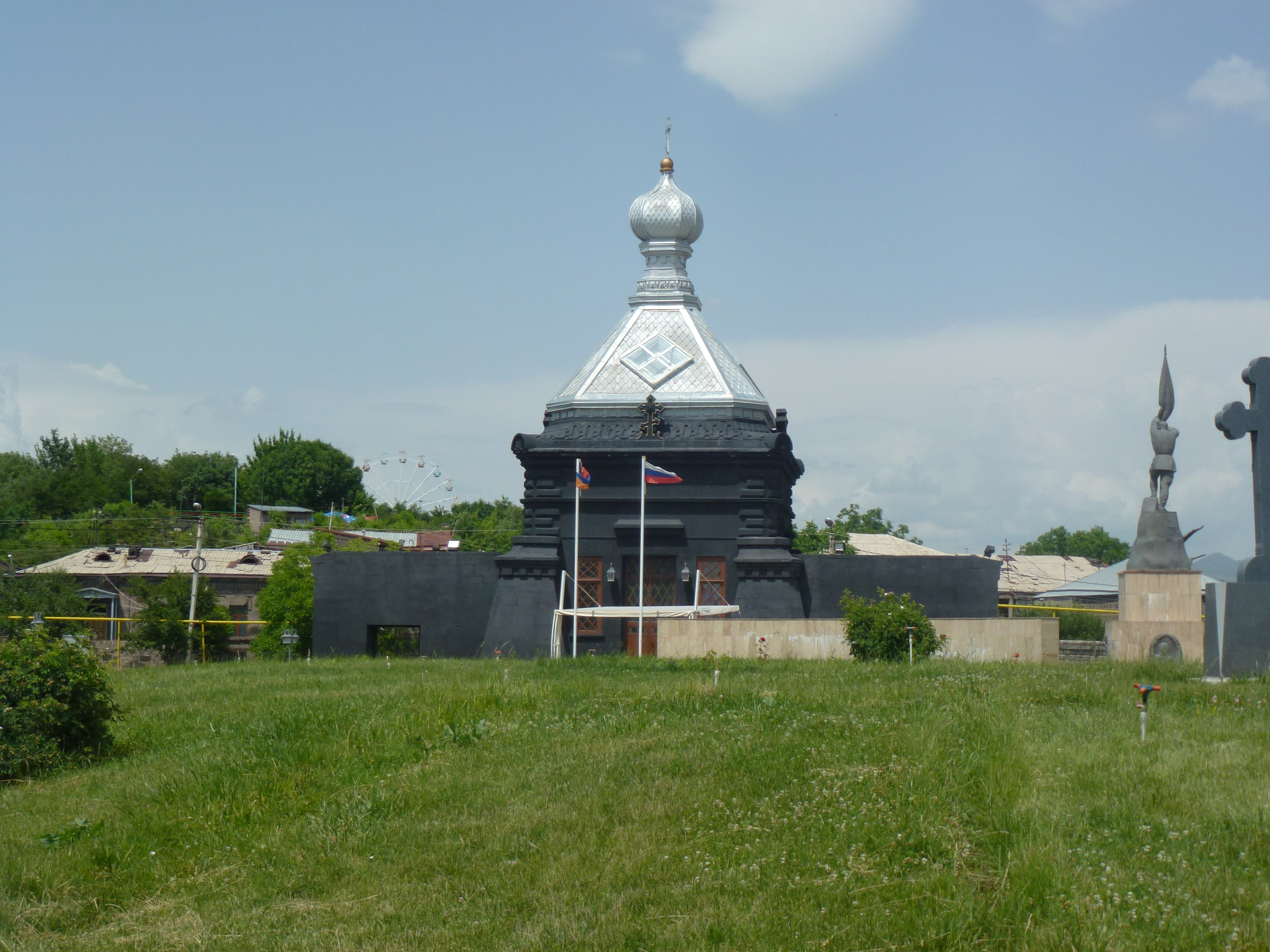
Saint Michael the Archangel Russian church

=== Religion ===
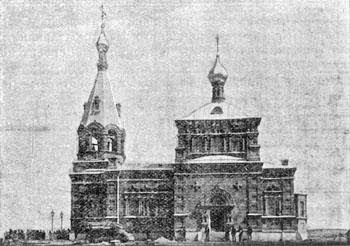
Russian church of the Seversky 18th Dragoon Regiment

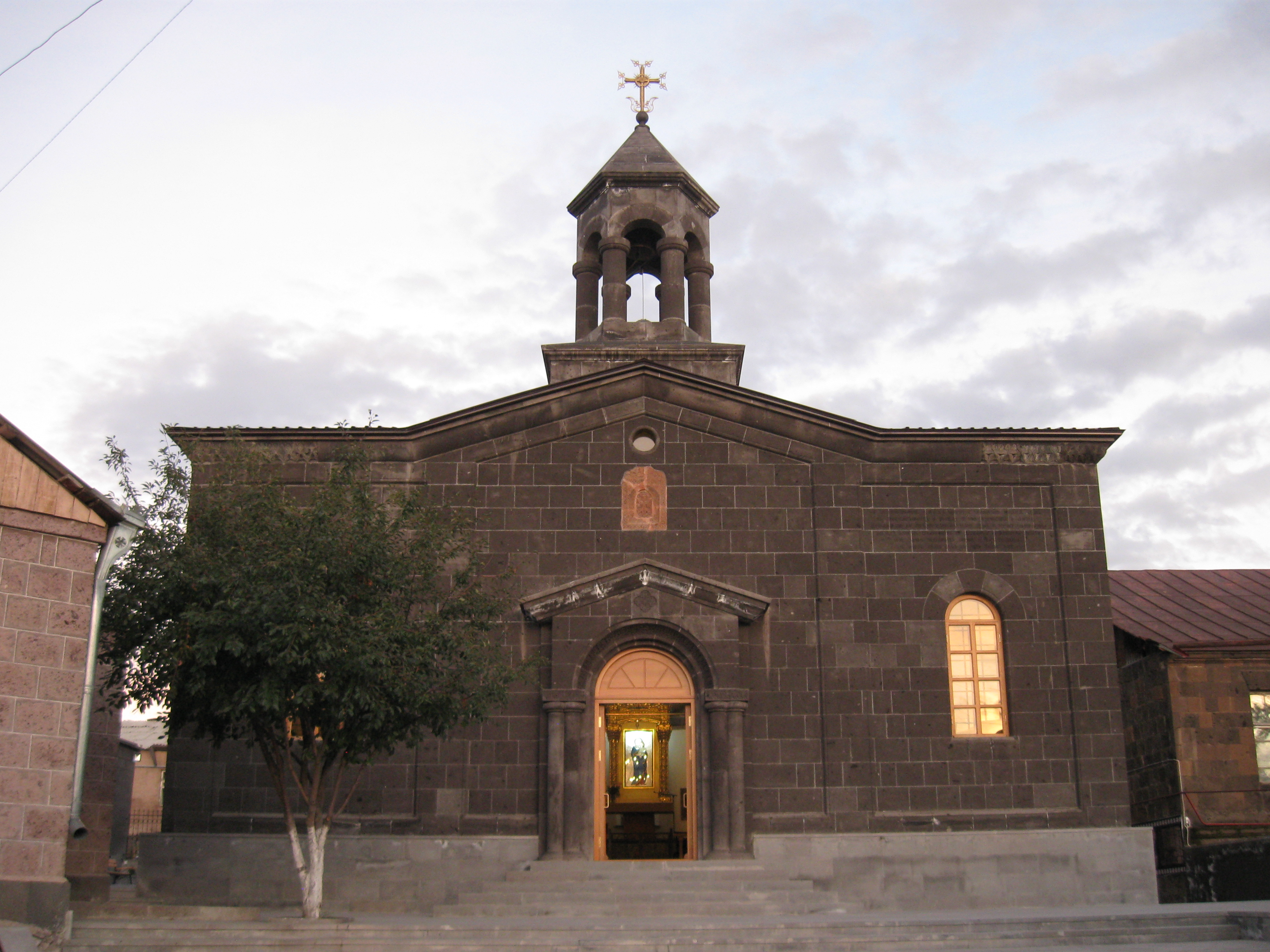
Saint Gregory Church

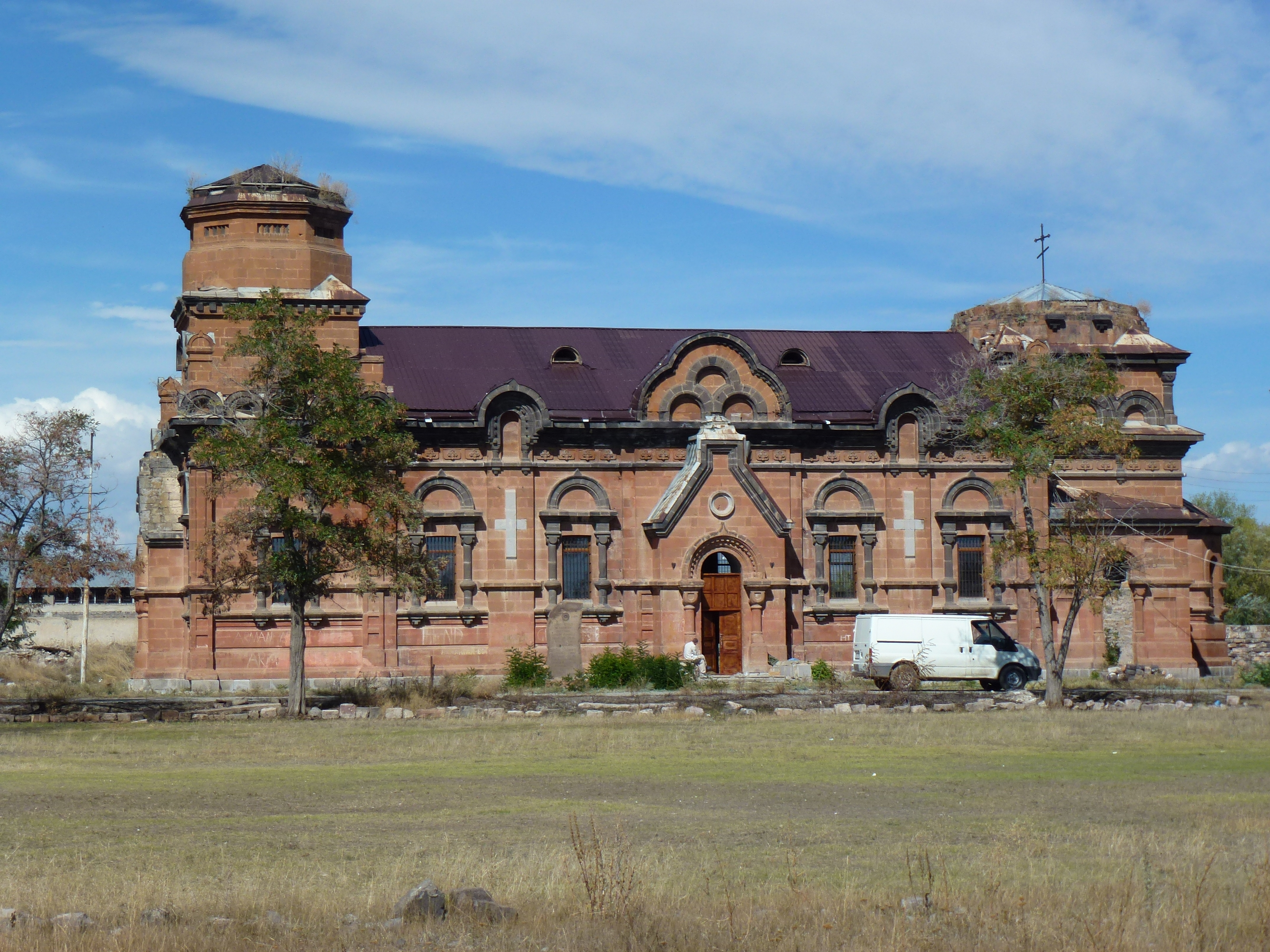
Saint Arsenije Russian church

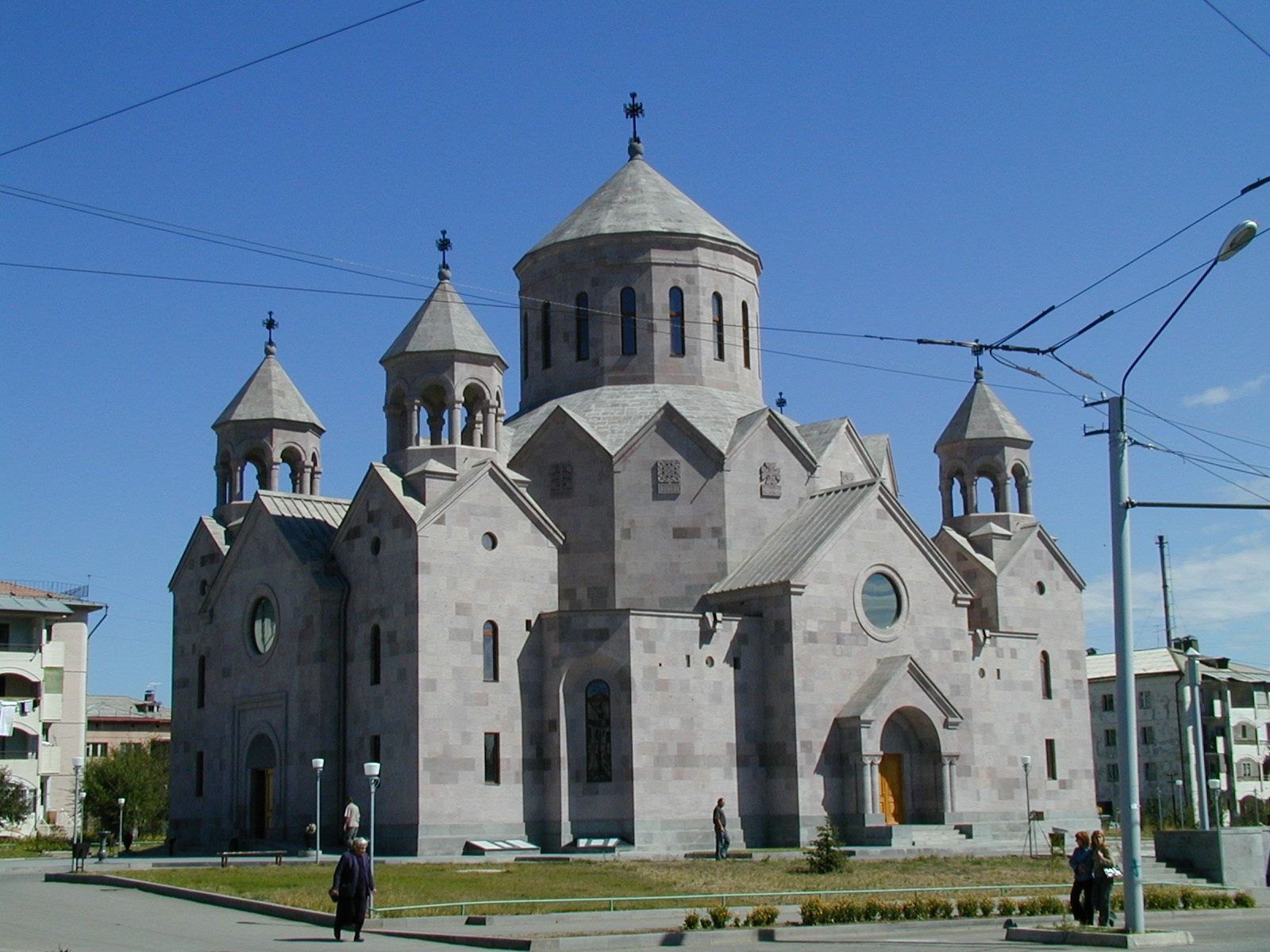
Saint Jacob of Nisibis Church

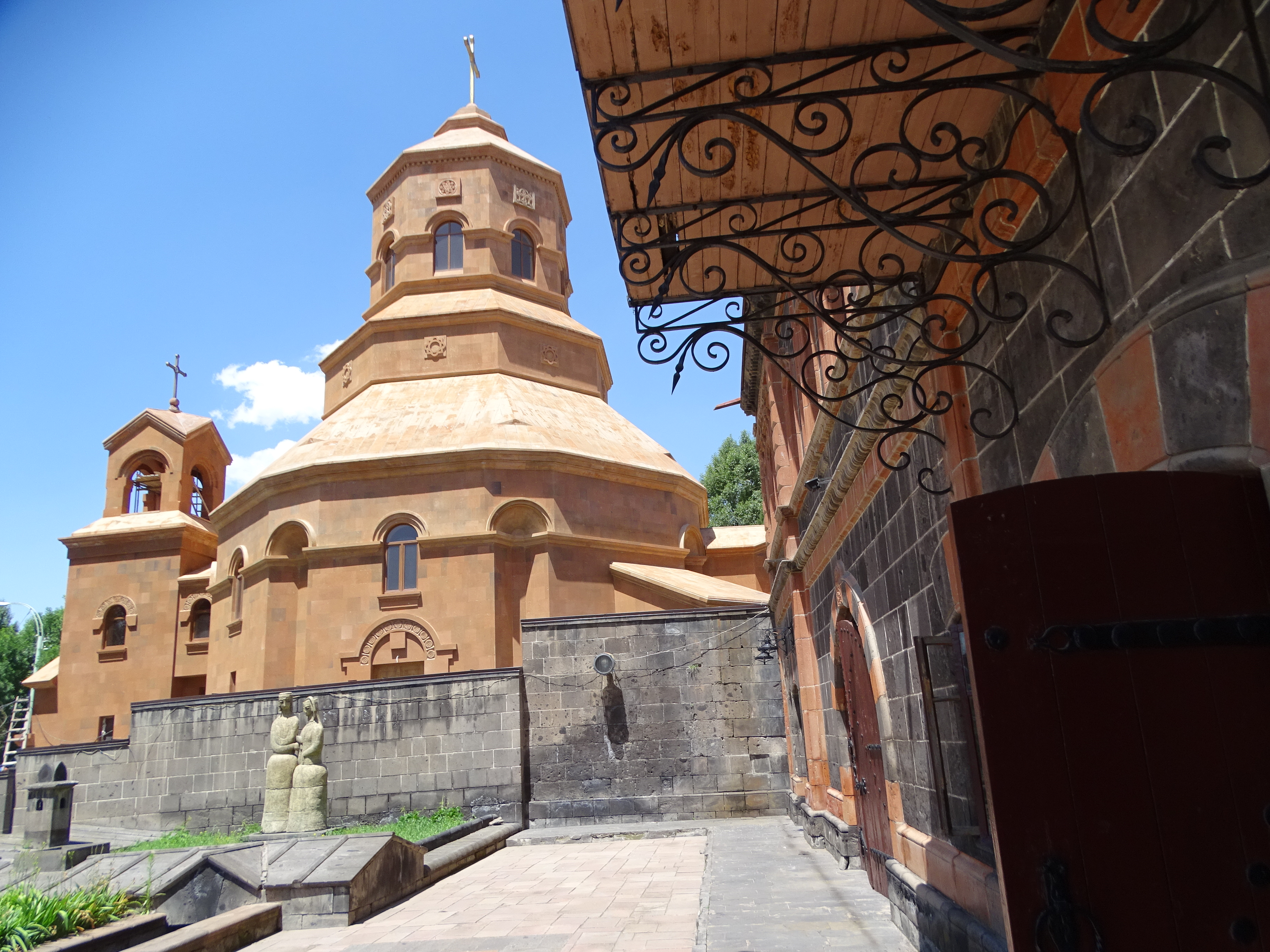
Cathedral of the Holy Martyrs

The majority of the population in Gyumri belongs to the Armenian Apostolic Church. The Cathedral of the Holy Mother of God of Gyumri—also known as the Cathedral of the Seven Wounds of the Holy Mother of God—is the seat of the Diocese of Shirak of the Armenian Church.

The Armenian Catholic Church, a minority in Armenia, is under the jurisdiction of the Ordinariate of Armenia, Georgia, Russia, and Eastern Europe, based in the Cathedral of the Holy Martyrs in Gyumri. As a consequence, the aid organisation of the Armenian Catholic Church, Armenian Caritas, is also headquartered in Gyumri. There are around 16,000 Armenian Catholics in the Shirak Province.

The presence of the small Russian Orthodox community along with the Russian military base personnel is marked with the Saint Alexandra the Martyr's Church (within the Russian base), the Church of Saint Michael the Archangel and the Church of Saint Arsenije.

However, many historic churches in Gyumri were either ruined or destroyed, including:

- Dprevank Monastery and the Basilic Church of old Kumayri dating back to the 7th century: it was the first ever church built in old Kumayri. However, the monastic complex was completely destroyed in 1852, during the construction of Russian military barracks.
- Saint George Greek Orthodox Church, opened in 1850. It was completely destroyed in 1933–34.
- Holy Mother of God Armenian Catholic Church, built between 1849 and 1854. Although standing, the building was turned into a private residence during the Soviet period.
- Russian church of the Seversky 18th Dragoon Regiment, built in 1856. It was consecrated in 1901 and destroyed during the Soviet period.
- Russian church of the Caucasian 7th Rifle Regiment, built during the 1850s. It was completely destroyed during the Soviet period.
- Russian church of the Caucasian 8th Rifle Regiment, built during the 1850s. It was completely destroyed during the Soviet period.
- Russian church of the Baku 154th Infantry Regiment, built during the 1850s. It was completely destroyed during the Soviet period.

As of 2017, Gyumri is home to the following church buildings:

- Saint Alexandra the Martyr's Church within the complex of the Russian military base, built in 1837–42. It was completely renovated and reopened on May 8, 2008.
- Church of the Holy Saviour or Surp Amenaprkich, constructed between 1859–1873: designed to resemble the Cathedral of Ani. The church was heavily damaged by the 1988 Spitak earthquake and is currently under reconstruction.
- Surp Nshan or Holy Sign Church: Opened in 1870.
- Saint Gregory the Illuminator's Church, built between 1875 and 1880.
- Saint Michael the Archangel Russian Orthodox Church, locally known as Plplan Zham (the Shimmering Chapel), built between 1875 and 1880.
- Cathedral of the Holy Mother of God: also known as Seven Wounds of the Holy Mother of God, constructed between 1873–1884. Currently, it is the seat of the Diocese of Shirak of the Armenian Apostolic Church.
- Saint Arseny Russian Orthodox Church, built during the 1870s and opened in 1910. It is locally known as the church of Kazachi Post.
- Saint Hripsime Chapel, opened in 1992.
- Saint Jacob of Nisibis Church: or Surp Hakob Mtsbinetsi Church, opened in 2005.
- Surp Sarkis Chapel, built in 2008 and opened in 2011.
- Surp Minas Chapel, opened in 2013.
- Cathedral of the Holy Martyrs of the Catholic Armenians, opened in 2015.

== Culture ==
=== Museums and art ===
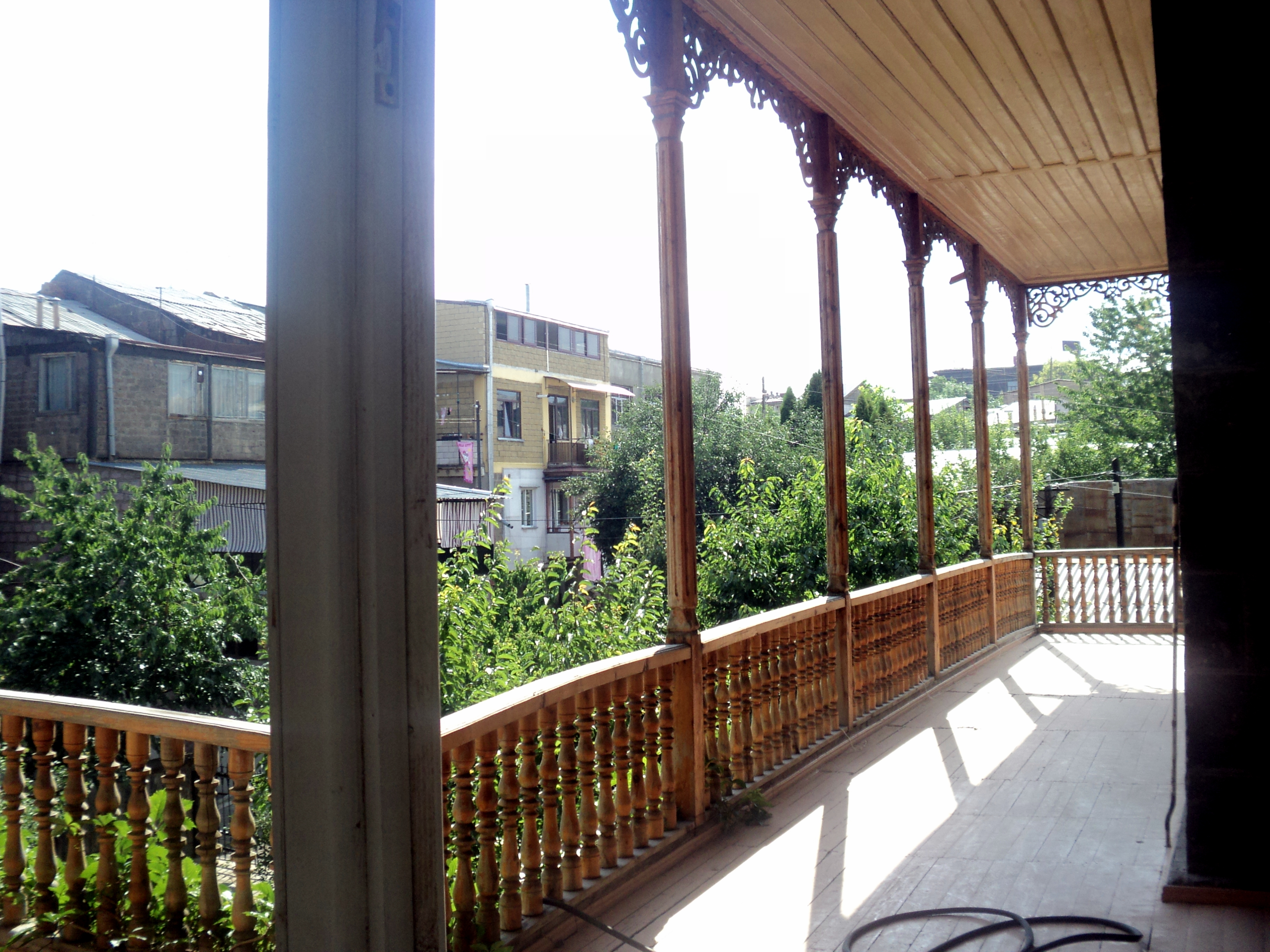
Aslamazyan Sisters House-Museum

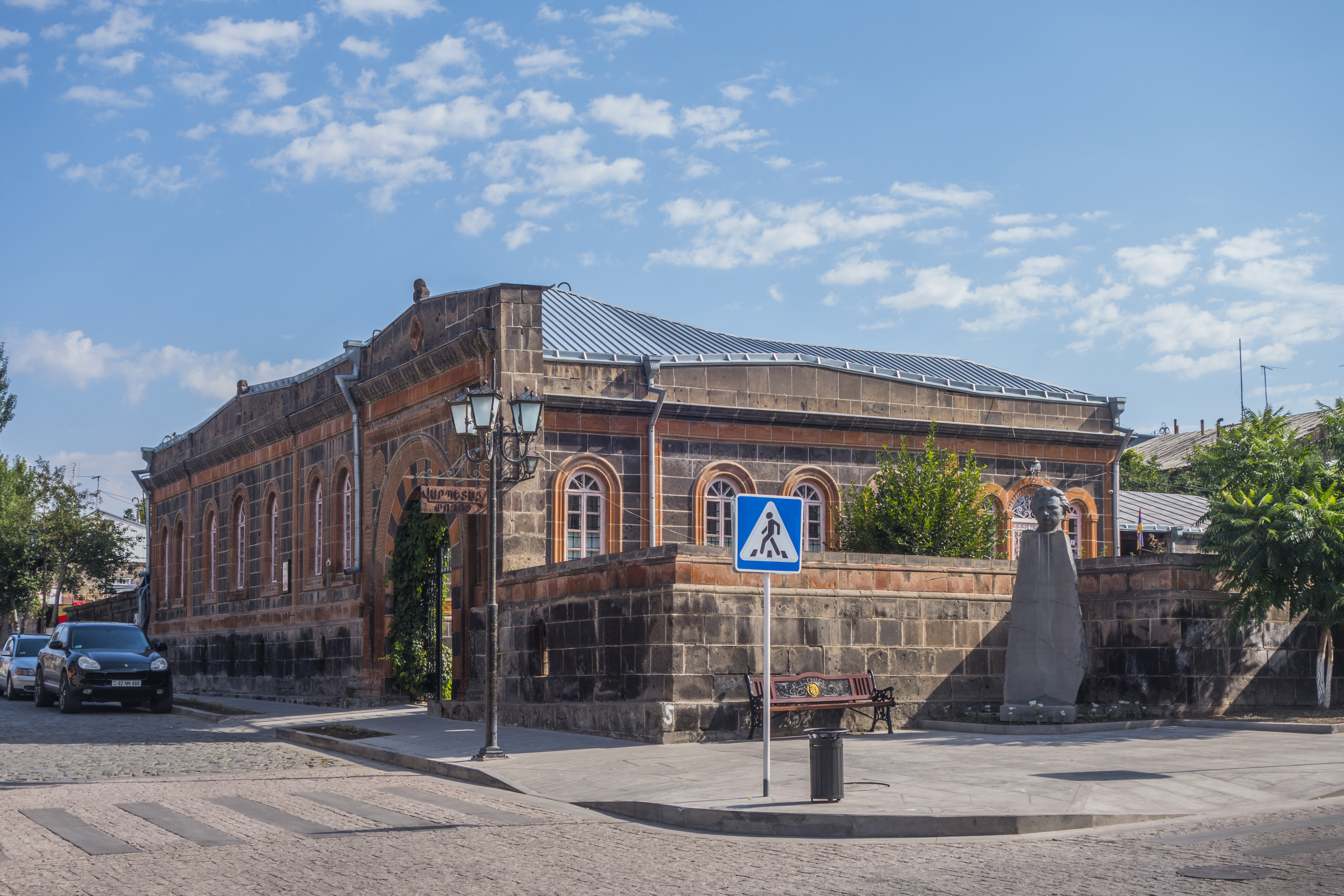
Hovhannes Shiraz House-Museum

Gyumri is home to many prominent museums of Armenia, including the House-Museums of sculptor Sergey Merkurov, poets Avetik Isahakyan and Hovhannes Shiraz, and actor Mher Mkrtchyan. The Aslamazyan Sisters Gallery, built in the 1880s, is home to more than 700 drawings, paintings and other works of the Aslamazyan sisters who were the Soviet-era artists. The Dzitoghtsyan Museum of Social Life and National Architecture of Gyumri is an old mansion, housing collections related to both history and the everyday-life of Gyumri, as well as paintings and other works of art.

Throughout centuries, Kumayri-Gyumri was labelled as the "city of crafts and arts", being famous for its schools, theaters and gusans.

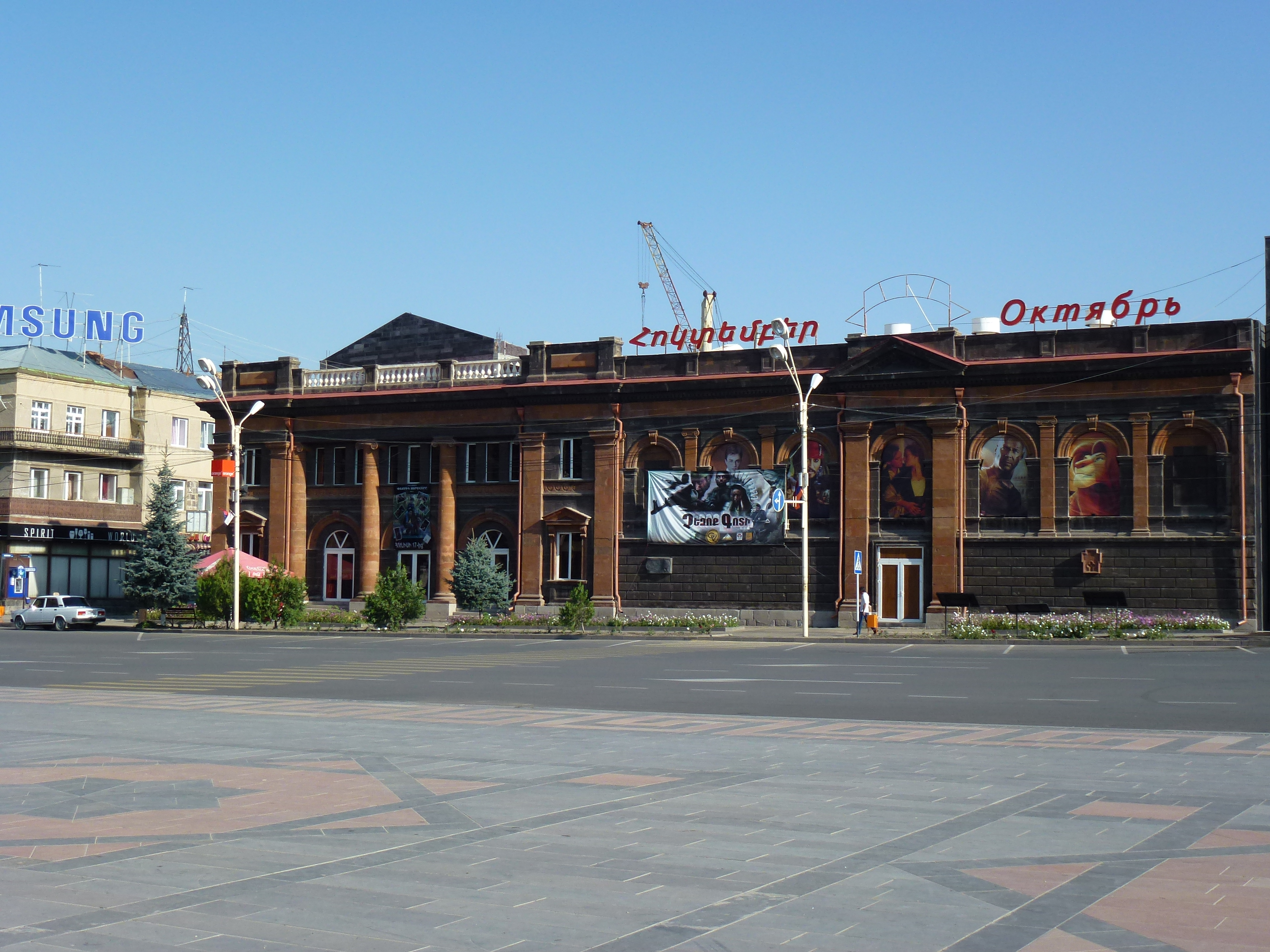
"October" cinema hall

In 1865, an amateur theatre group in Gyumri performed H. Karinyan's "Shushanik". In 1912, Gyumri was home to the first opera show ever staged in Armenia, when composer Armen Tigranian presented Anoush to the public in Alexandropol. In 1923, the first Armenian opera theatre was opened in Gyumri (where the first ballet performance in Armenia took place in 1924), while the Vardan Ajemian State Drama Theatre was founded in 1928. Prominent directors Ruben Simonov and Vardan Ajemian, actors Mher Mkrtchyan, Azat Sherents and Varduhi Varderesyan worked in theatre. The theatre's new building was opened in 1972. The artistic director is Nikolay Tsaturyan. Gyumri is known for its 19th-century architecture and urban constructions.

The first printing house of Gyumri was founded in 1876 by G. Sanoyan and operated until 1918. It published literary works (including Avetik Isahakyan's first book), calendars, textbooks. Another printing house, Ayg (founded 1892), published historical books and the first periodical of Gyumri, Akhuryan.

In 1987, several artists — including Arman Grigoryan, Sev (Hendrik Khachatryan), Karen Andreasyan and others — set up an exhibition in the Artists' Union of Armenia's building, in the conference hall on the third floor. The resulting Third Floor (Armenian: Երորդ Հարկ) modern art group has been described as "anti-Soviet, anti-Establishment and in some ways anti-art, a clever appropriation of and comment on several movements, including performance art and American Pop Art." By 1994, the group dispersed as its utopian mood faltered in the wake of post-independence hyperinflation and power outages.

Gyumri is home to the Gyumri Biennial, organized by the artist Azat Sargsyan and the Gyumri Center of Contemporary Art (GCCA). Gyumri was officially declared Commonwealth of Independent States cultural capital in 2013.

=== Music ===
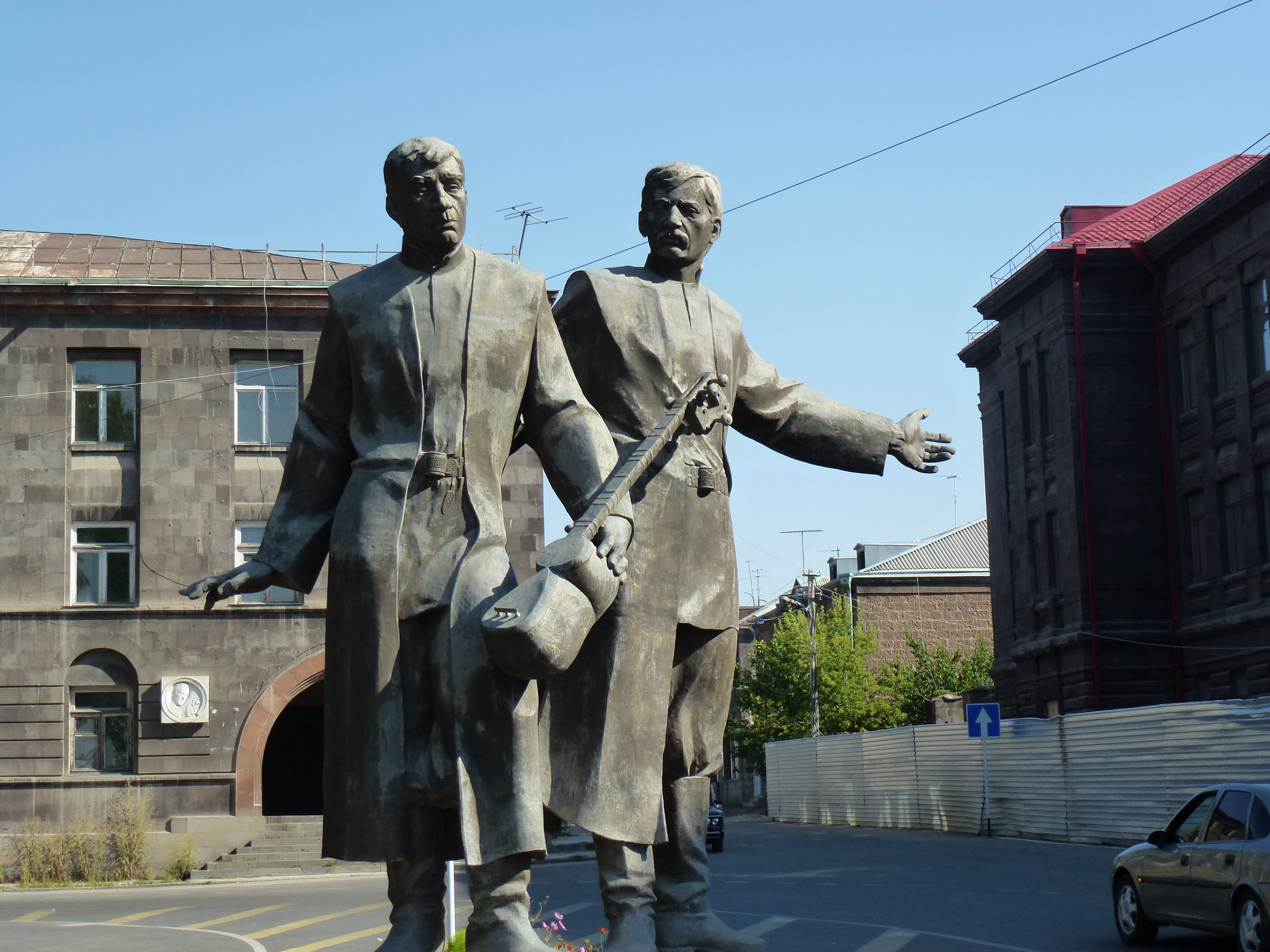
A statue of two gusans in Gyumri, depicting Sheram and Jivani

The city of Gyumri has a great contribution in Armenian folk music. Throughout the 19th century, Alexandrapol was considered the center of folk and traditional Armenian music. The musical culture of Alexandrapol has greatly influenced the art of Jivani, who is considered the founder of modern Armenian folk music during the 19th century. Another 19th-century ashik Sheram who was born in Alexandropol, is one of the earliest gusans of traditional Armenian music in the modern history of Armenia. He is one of the most celebrated Armenian composers of folk music.

The mystic philosopher of Alexandropol George Gurdjieff has produced many influential works of music during the 20th century.

Different genres of music became popular in the city during the 2nd half of the 20th century. Rock, folk rock and ethnic rock are widely popular through the local famous rock band Bambir, active since 1978.

In 1986, the Gyumri State Orchestra of Folk Instruments was founded, followed by the Gyumri State Symphonic Orchestra founded in 1993. In 1997, the KOHAR Symphony Orchestra and Choir was founded in Gyumri through the efforts of the Lebanese-Armenian philanthropist Harout Khatchadourian. Soon after, KOHAR became one of the most celebrated choirs in Armenia as well as throughout the Armenian diaspora.

Influenced by Gurdjieff, the Armenian musician Levon Eskenian founded The Gurdjieff Ensemble in 2008. The award-winning ensemble gathers many of Armenia's leading practitioners of traditional music, performing on duduk, sring, kamancha, oud, kanōn, santur, tar, saz, daf, dhol, and tombak.

The Renaissance international music festival of Gyumri is held annually since 2009.

In 2011 WhoCares, a supergroup formed by Ian Gillan and Tony Iommi with the participation of a great number of rock artists, raised money to build the "Octet" music school in Gyumri (opened two years later).

=== Films ===
Several famous Armenian films were shot in Gyumri such as The Tango of Our Childhood (Armenian: Մեր մանկության տանգոն), Triangle (Armenian: Եռանկյունի), The Dawn of the Sad Street (Armenian: Տխուր փողոցի լուսաբացը), The Merry Bus (Armenian: Ուրախ ավտոբուս) and other. The city has preserved some locations where scenes from these films were filmed.

=== Monuments ===
- Kumayri historic district: is the old part of Gyumri with its unique architecture. It has more than a thousand buildings dating back to the 18th and 19th centuries. The district is one of few places in the Republic of Armenia, and the world, with authentic urban Armenian architecture. Almost all the structures of the Kumayri district have survived the two major earthquakes in 1926 and 1988 respectively. The historic district of Kumayri occupies the central and western part of modern-day Gyumri.
- Sev Berd or the Black Fortress (Armenian: Սև բերդ; Russian: Чёрная Кре́пость, Chornaya Krepost): is an abandoned Russian imperial fortress in Gyumri built between 1834 and 1847, located 8 kilometres (5.0 mi) east of the closed border with Turkey. It was erected in response to the Russo-Turkish War of 1828–1829. Currently, it is a national cultural heritage monument of Armenia, used as an art and cultural center
- The monumental statue of Mother Armenia erected in 1975.
- Vartanants Square is the central town square of Gyumri.
- Independence Square.
- Charles Aznavour Square.
- Garegin Nzhdeh Square.
- Gyumri Central Park, founded during the 1920s on the site of the old cemetery of the city.
- Statue of Avetik Isahakyan (Gyumri)

The restoration process of the damaged buildings of Gyumri has been spearheaded by Earthwatch to preserve the city's unique architecture.

In spite of suffering severe damages during the disastrous earthquake in December 1988, Gyumri is still preserving its own architectural characteristics.

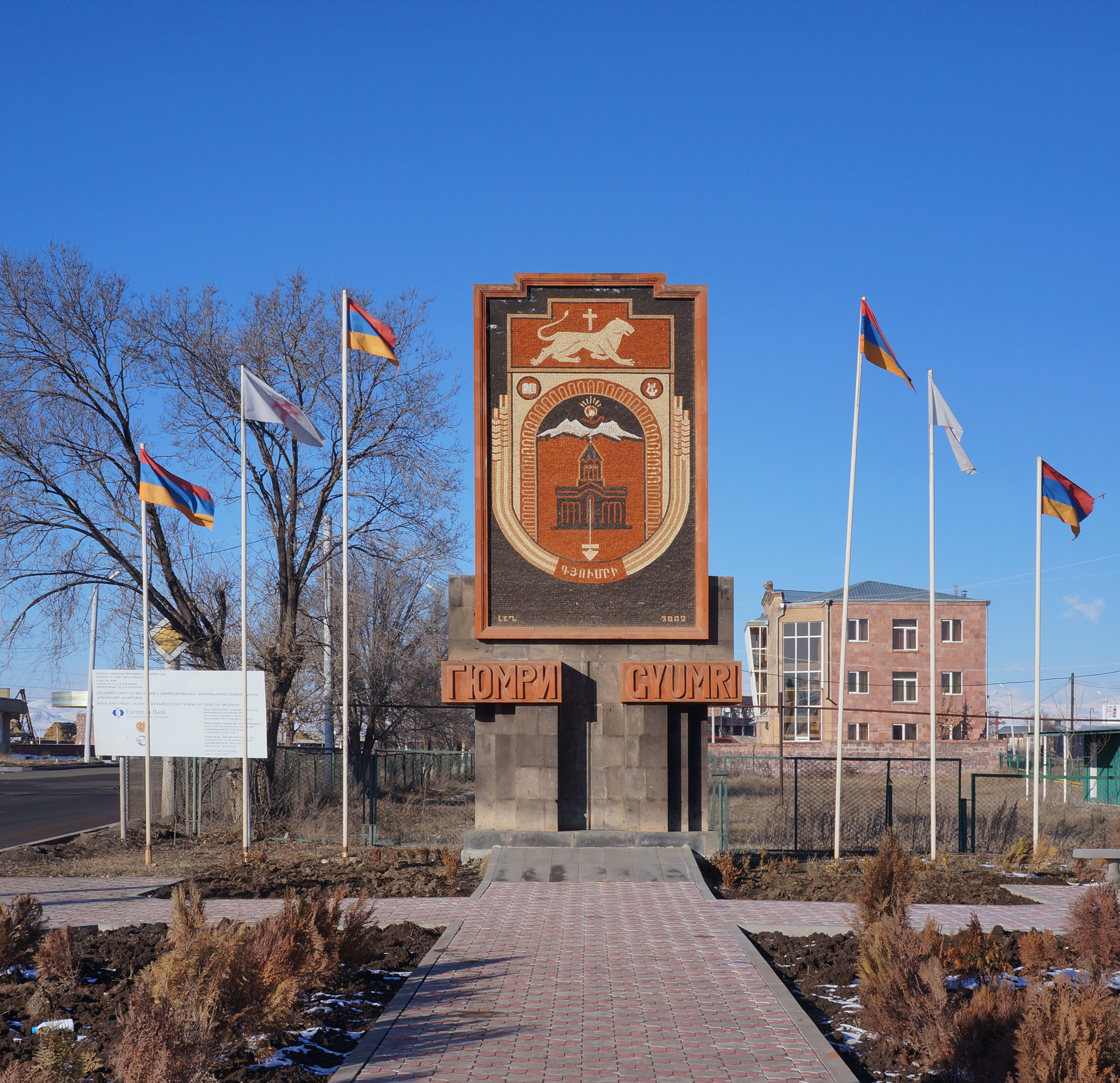
Monument at the entrance to the city

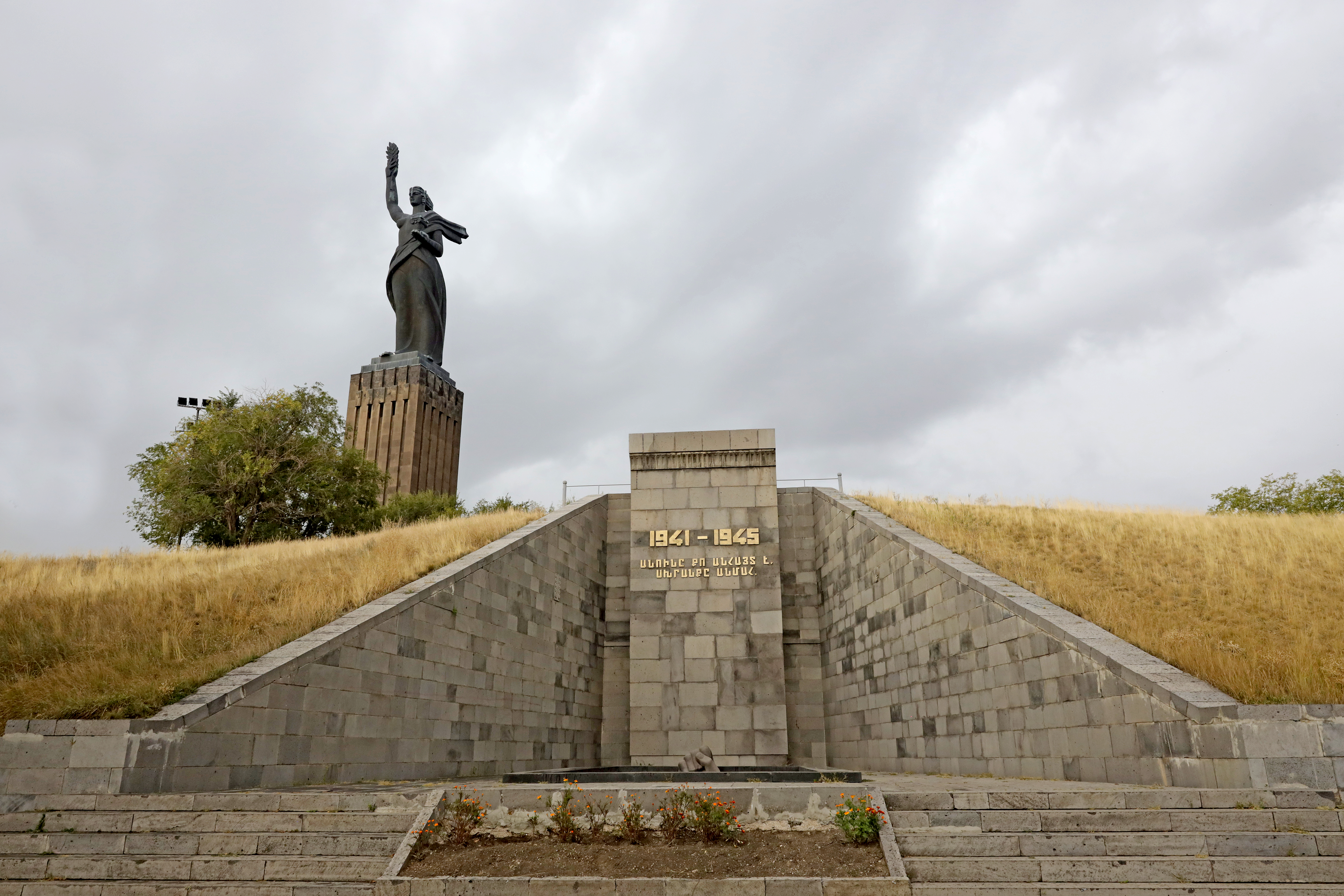
Victory Park and Mother-Armenia Monument

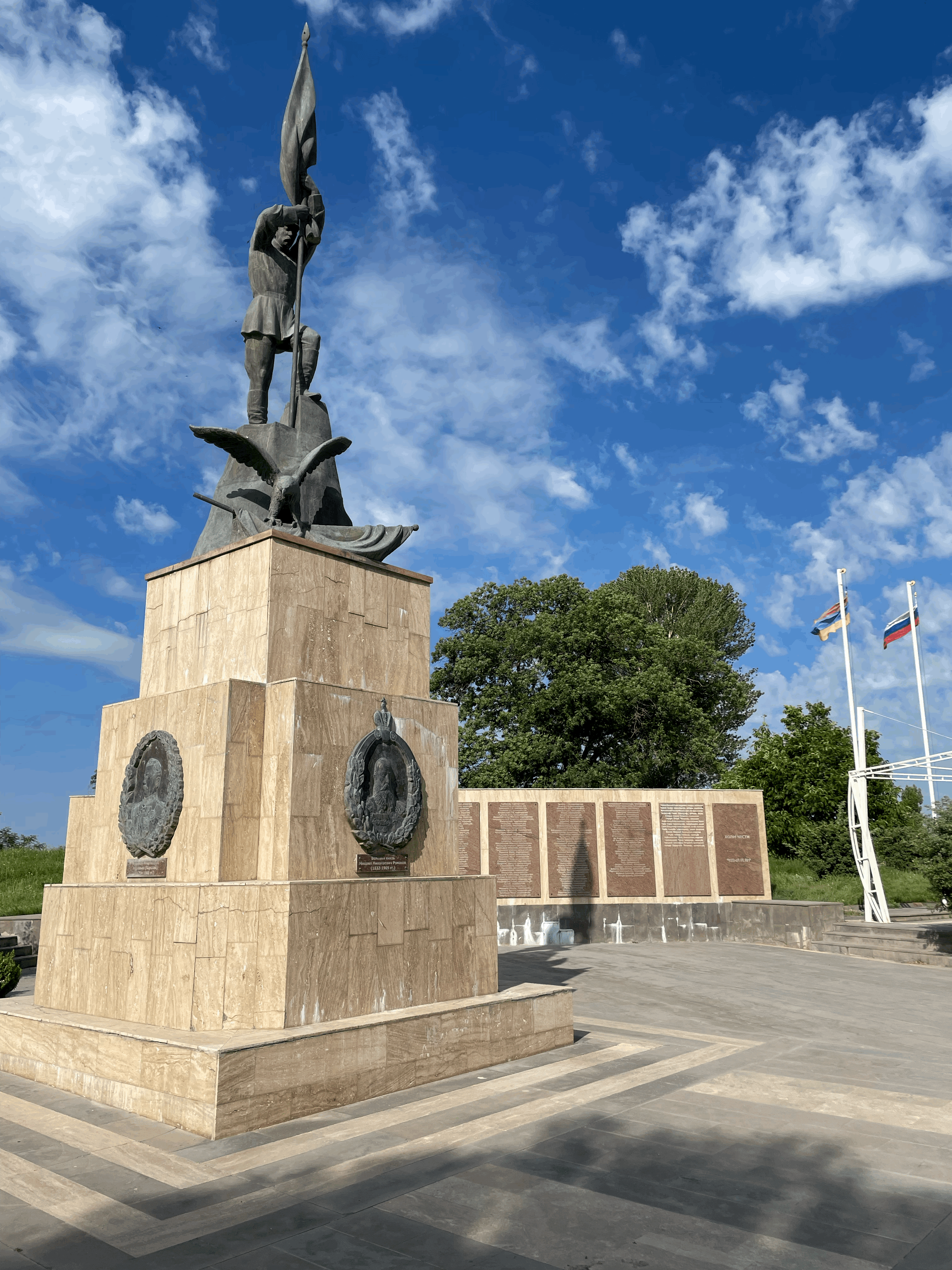
St. Michael Church sculpture, Hill of honor

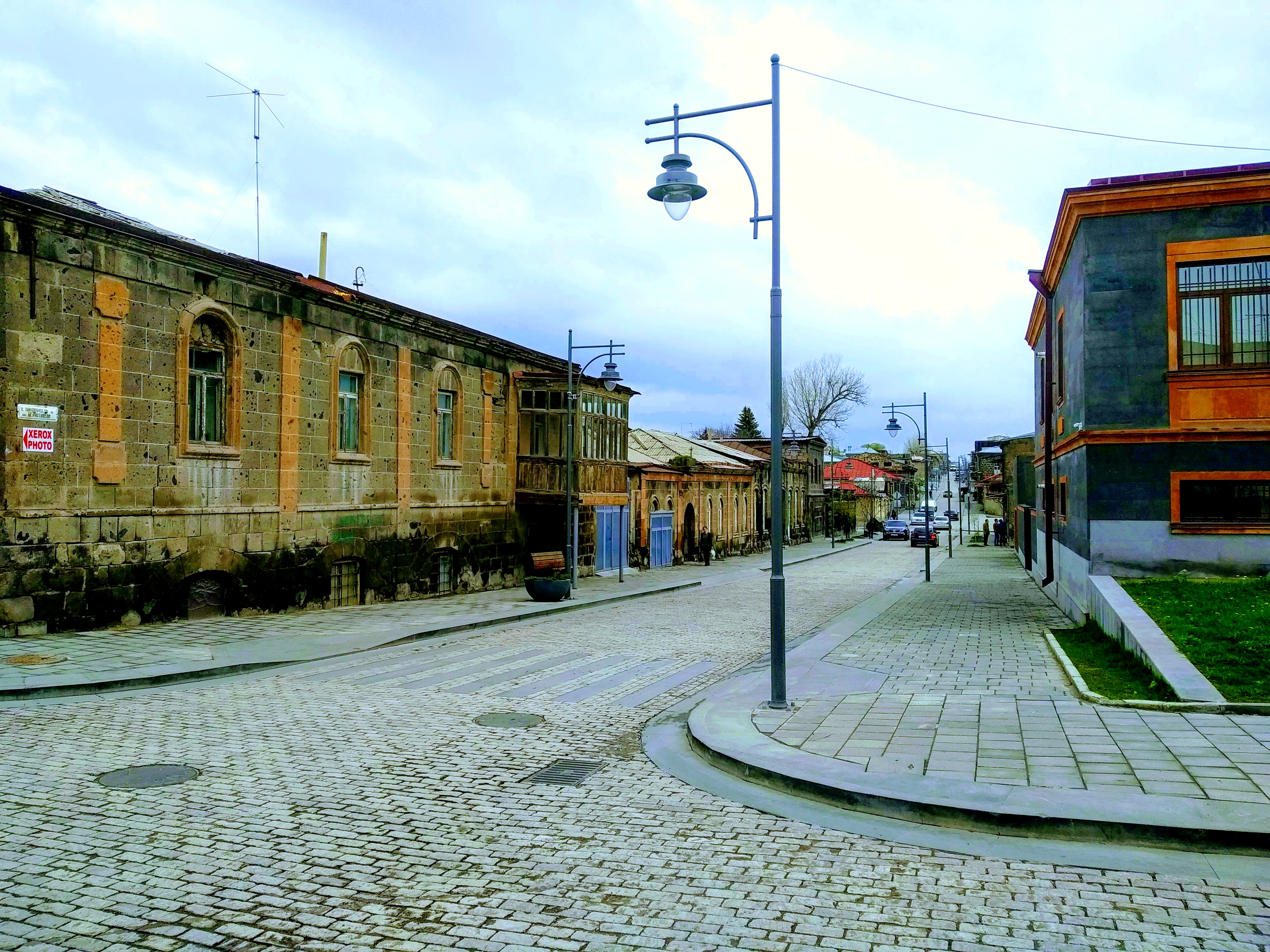
Rustaveli Street the Kumayri historic district

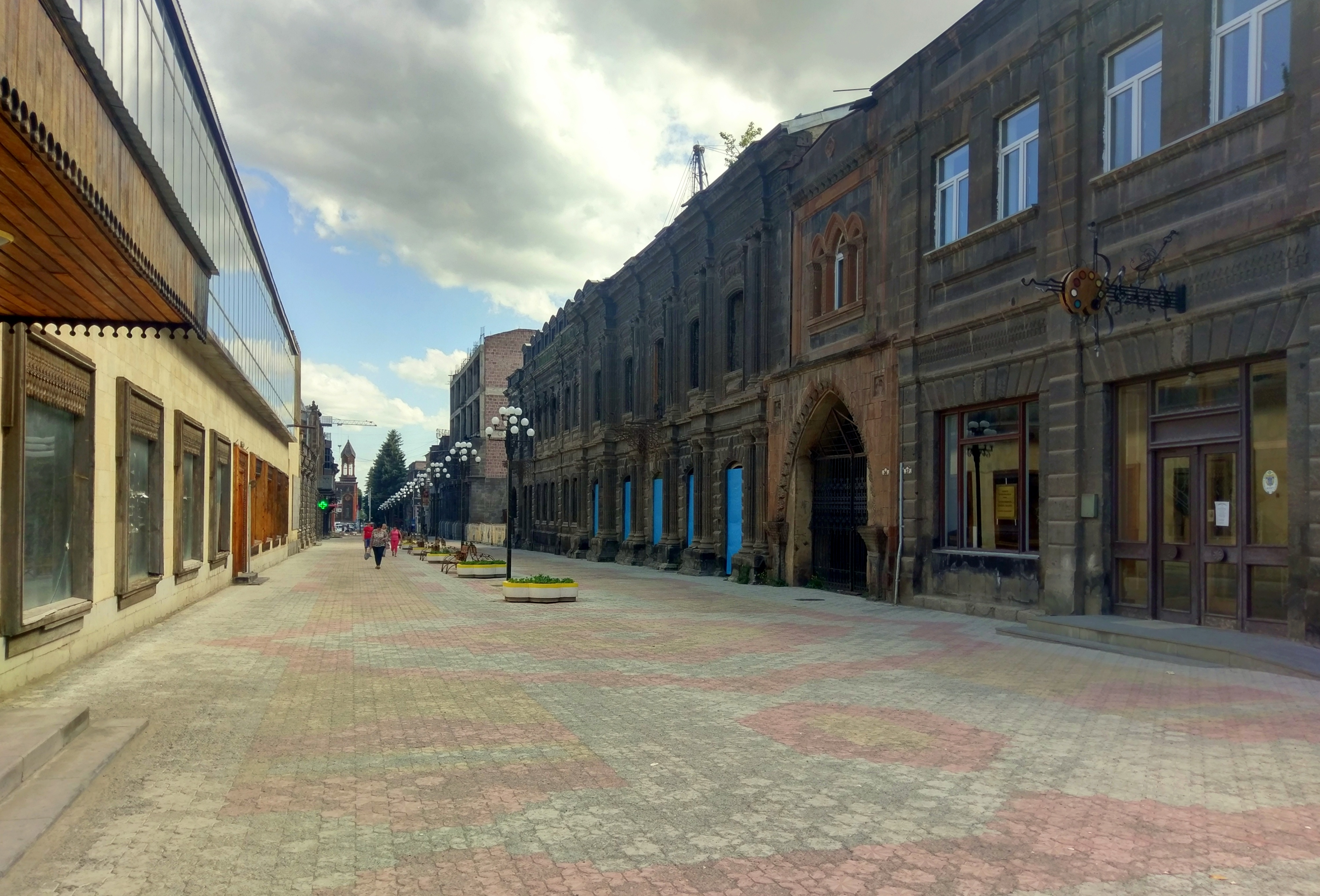
Kirk Kerkorian (formerly Alexandrovsky) Street of Kumayri district

=== Local customs ===
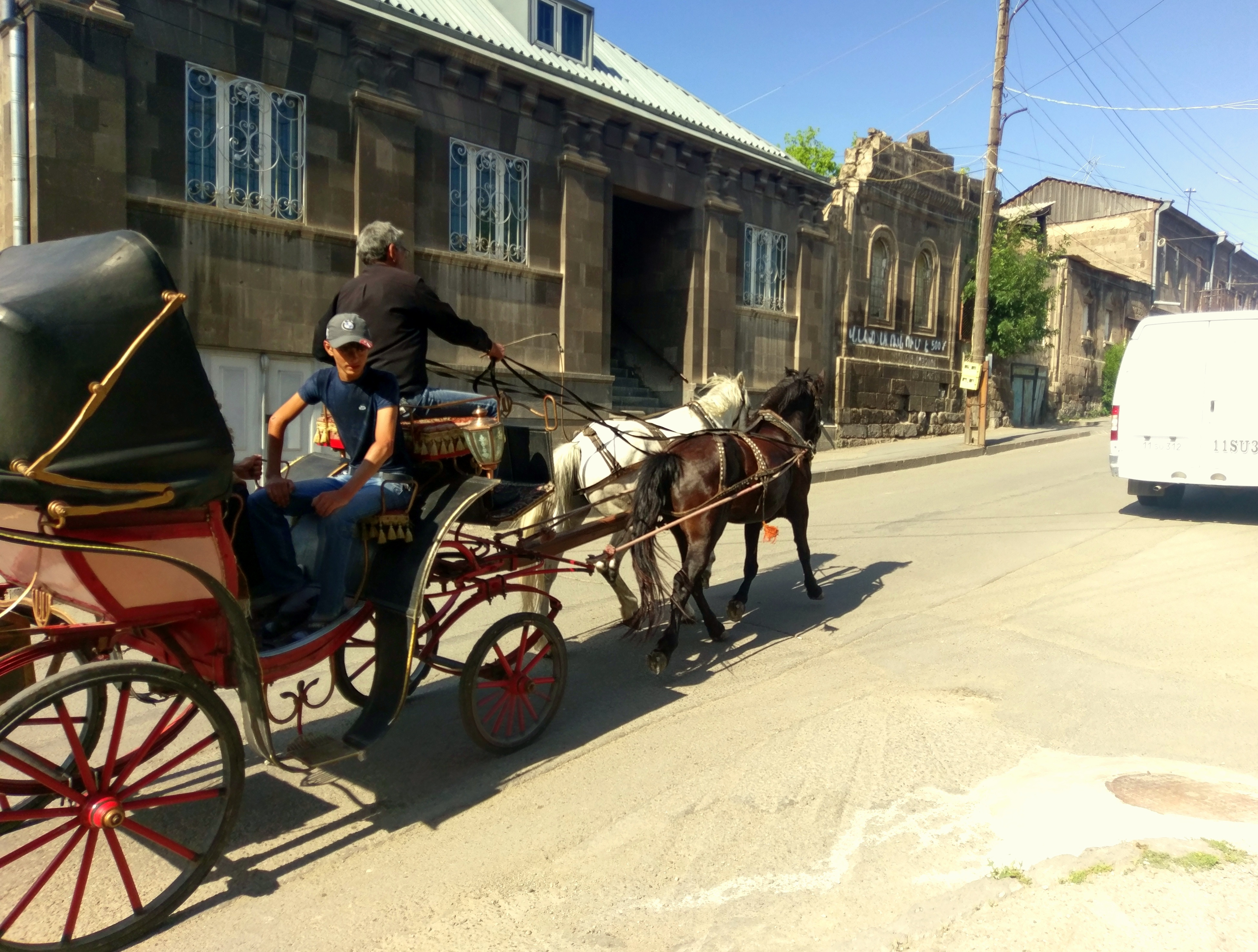
Rentable horse-drawn carriage at the center of Gyumri

The residents are Gyumri are widely known as conservative people. Traditions and local customs are widely preserved by the local citizens. It is very common among Armenians to refer to the dignity of Gyumri (Armenian: Գյումրվա թասիբ Gyumrva tasib).

Gyumri is considered to be the "laughter and humor capital" of Armenia. The jokes and anecdotes of local humorists like Jgher Khachik and Poloz Mukuch are widely known by the local citizens. Many works have been published to narrate about the legacy and heritage of the humor in Gyumri.

The city celebrates the "Gyumri Day" annually on the first Sunday of October. It is marked with many cultural and entertainment activities.

=== Media ===
Gyumri has 4 regional TV stations:

- Tsayg TV, operating since 1991.
- Shirak Public TV, operating since 1992.
- Gala TV, operating since 2005.
- Shant, operating since 1994.

Shrjapa, a weekly, is the local newspaper of Gyumri.

== Transportation ==
=== Air transportation ===
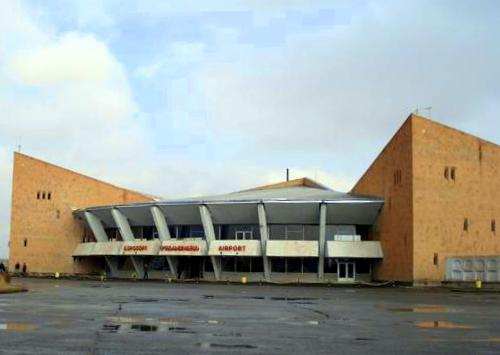
Shirak Airport

Gyumri is served by the international Shirak Airport, about 5 kilometres (3.1 miles) to the southeast of the city center. It was inaugurated in 1961 and is the second largest airport in Armenia. At the beginning of 2006, the government of Armenia felt the importance of having a second international airport, when adverse weather conditions meant that many flights had to be diverted from Yerevan's Zvartnots International Airport into Gyumri's Shirak Airport. New air traffic control equipment allowed airport workers to identify planes in a 400-kilometre (250-mile) radius.

Following moderate use in 2005 and 2006 during which annual passenger traffic was at about 46,000 and several hundred aircraft movements took place each year, the airport's activity quickly declined again to the point where in 2016 passenger traffic amounted to only 12,421 and a mere 54 aircraft movements took place. However, in the beginning of 2017, as part of new efforts to develop Gyumri and its tourism industry, the government focused on revitalizing the airport. Multiple new airlines began operating flights to the airport, including Taron Avia, a new Armenian airline based in Gyumri. In order attract more customers, the Ministry of Nature Protection made meteorological services free for all airlines flying to Gyumri, lowering ticket costs. The Gyumri Technology Center also participated in helping revitalize the airport by adding interior design details to improve the airport's look.

=== Railway ===
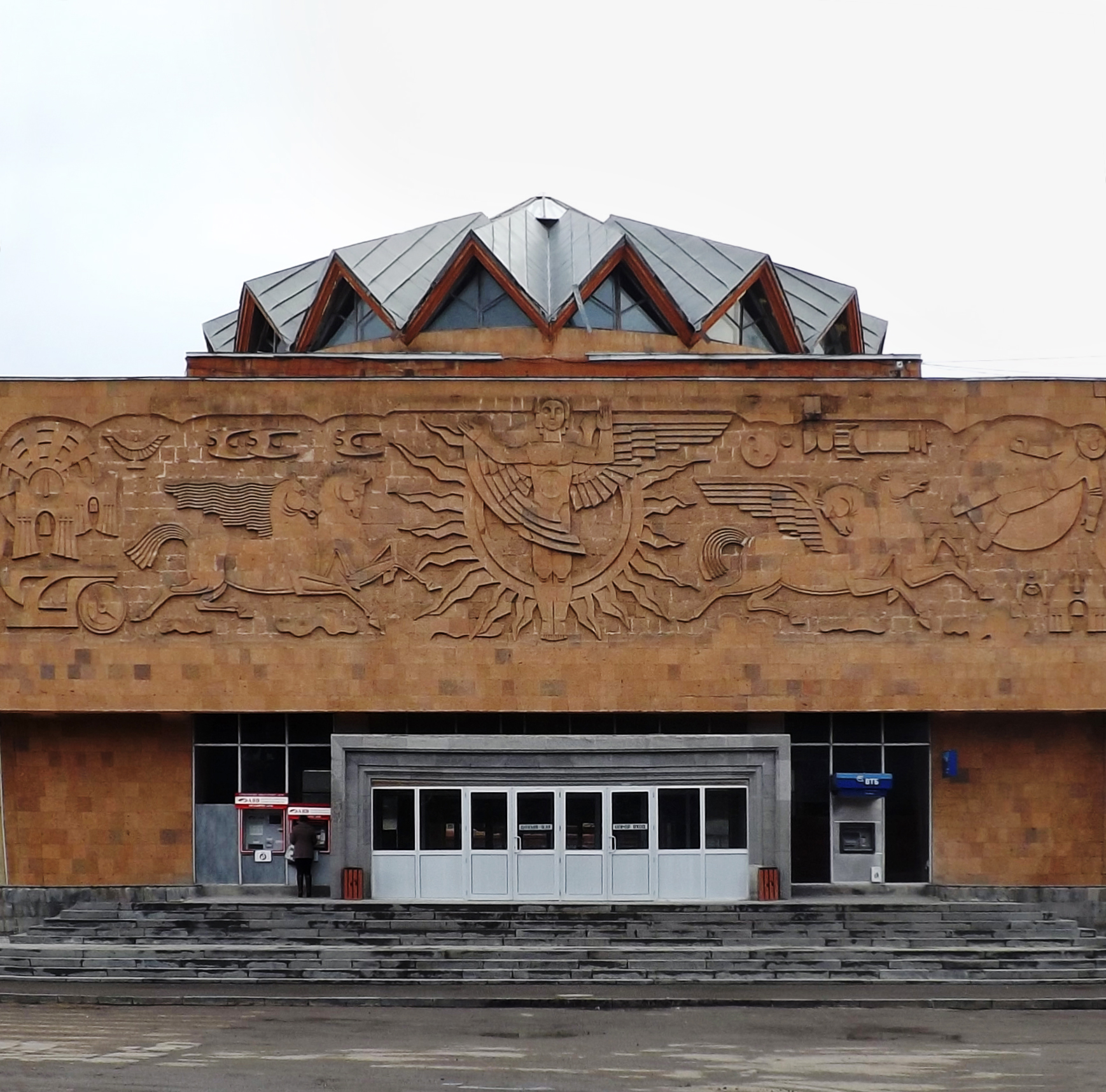
Gyumri Railway Station

The railway junction of Gyumri is the oldest and the largest one in Armenia. It was formed in 1897 and the first railway link to Alexandropol that connected the city with Tiflis was completed in 1899. The rail line was then extended from Alexandropol to Yerevan (in 1902), Kars (in 1902), Jolfa (in 1906), and Tabriz. As a result, Alexandropol became an important rail hub.

As of 2017, the Gyumri Railway Station operates regular trips to Yerevan and Batumi. The South Caucasus Railway CJSC, is the current operator of the railway sector in Armenia.

=== Public vans and taxis ===
Public transport is dominated by the private sector in Gyumri. Public transit is mainly served by public vans, locally-known as marshrutka. Most of the marshrutkas Russian-made GAZelle vans with 13 seats that operate with certain routes and stops. As of 2017, the one-way trip fee is AMD 100 (around US$0.25). Passengers need to pay the money directly to the driver when getting in the vehicle, with no established ticketing system.

The central station of the city serves as bus terminal for inter-city transport, serving outbound routes towards other major cities and towns in Armenia, as well as cities in Georgia. The M-7 Motorway passes across the Shirak Province from east to west, connecting the city of Gyumri with the rest of Armenia.

Armenia is among the top 10 safest countries where one can wander around and go home alone safely at night. Taxis are available in the city at any time of the day or night.

== Economy ==
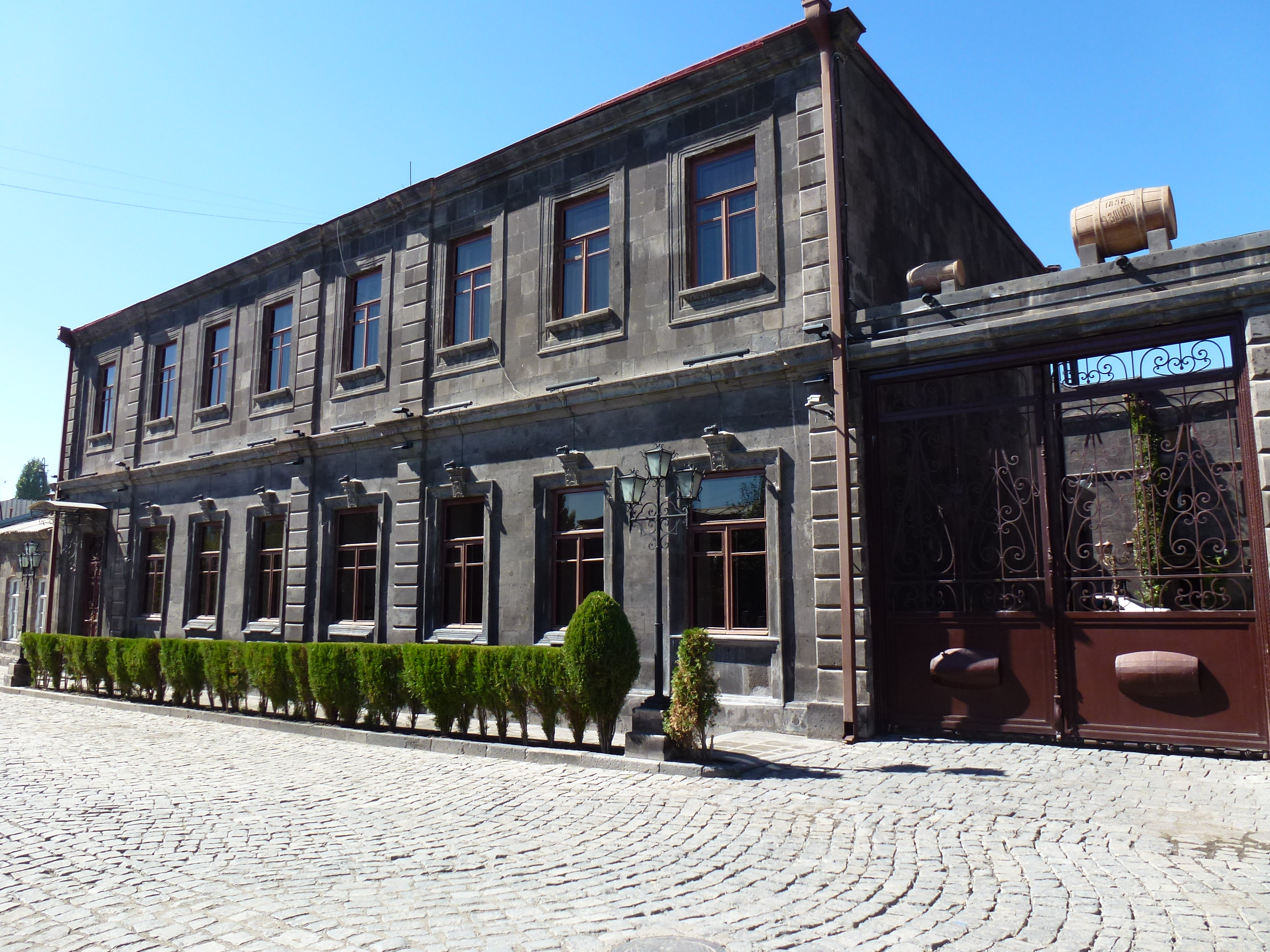
The old brewery in Gyumri, opened in 1898

During the pre-Soviet era, Alexandropol was considered the third-largest trade and cultural center in Transcaucasia after Tiflis and Baku (Yerevan would not rise to prominence until being proclaimed as the capital of independent Armenia in 1918 and the Armenian SSR in 1920). At the end of the 19th century, the population of Alexandropol had grown to 32,100 inhabitants, with a majority of Armenians.

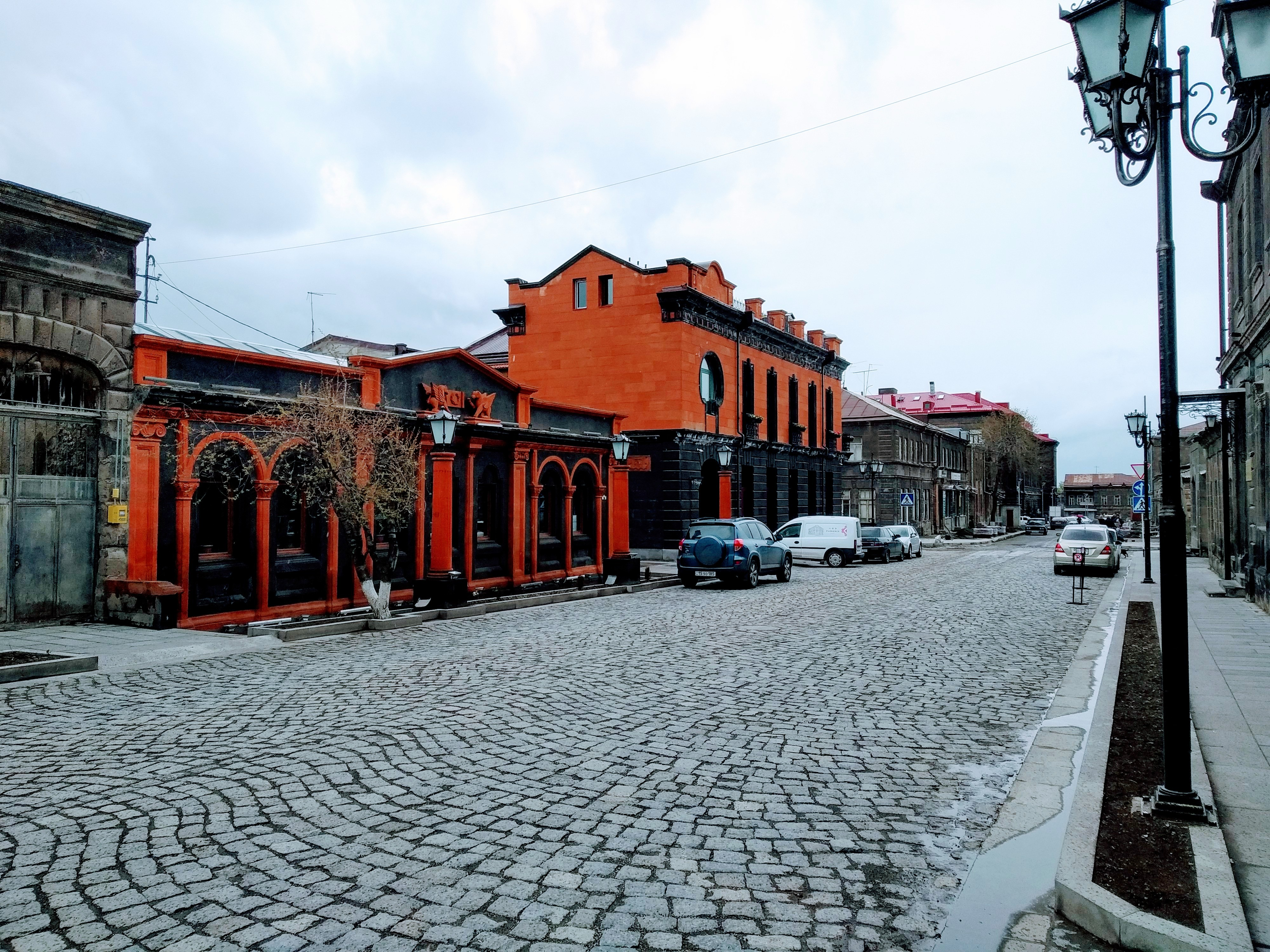
Poloz Mukuch Beerhouse at Jivani Street

The economy of Gyumri is mainly based on industry and construction. However, tourism and banking services are also among the developed sectors in the city.

The industrial sector in the provincial center Gyumri includes the production of building materials (tufa and basalt), hosiery and textile manufacturing, food processing and dairy products, alcoholic drinks, electronic machines, etc. The largest industrial plant in Gyumri is the Gyumri-Beer Brewery opened in 1972. The factory produces a variety of lager beer under the brands Gyumri, Ararat and Aleksandrapol. The city is also home to the "Factory of Bending Machinses" opened in 1912, the "Arshaluys" hosiery manufacturing enterprise established in 1926, the "Karhat" machine tools plant opened in 1959, the "Chap Chemical LLC" since 1999, the "Armtex Group" clothing factory since 2000, and the "Lentex" hosiery manufacturing plant is operating since 2001. Other industrial firms of the city include the "Aleqpol" factory for dairy products, the "Anusharan" confectionery plant, and the "Gold Plast" plant for building materials.

The nearby village of Akhuryan is home to the "Lusastgh-Sugar" factory (opened in 2010), the largest sugar producers in the Southern Caucasus region.

== Education ==
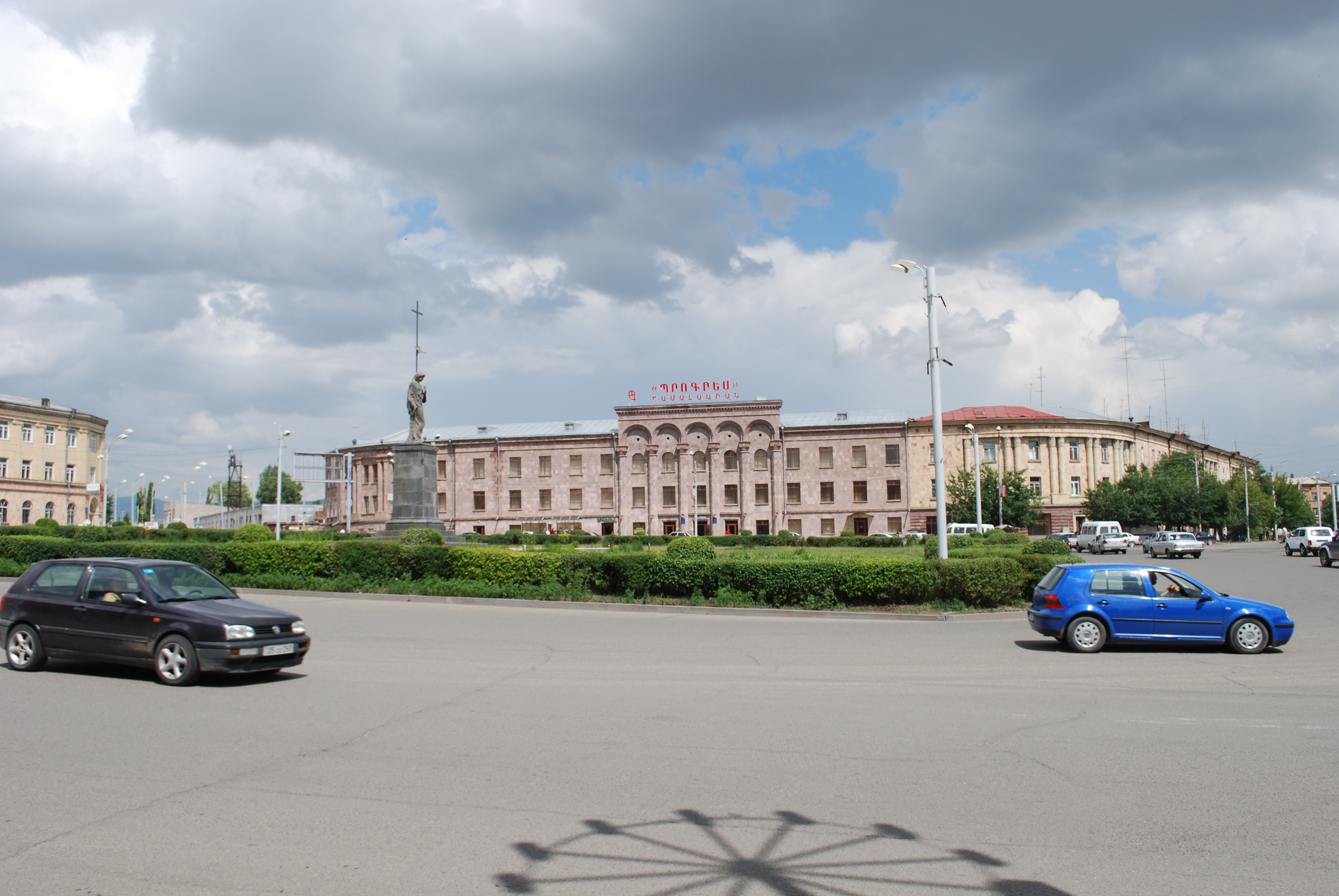
Progress Gyumri University at the Independence Square

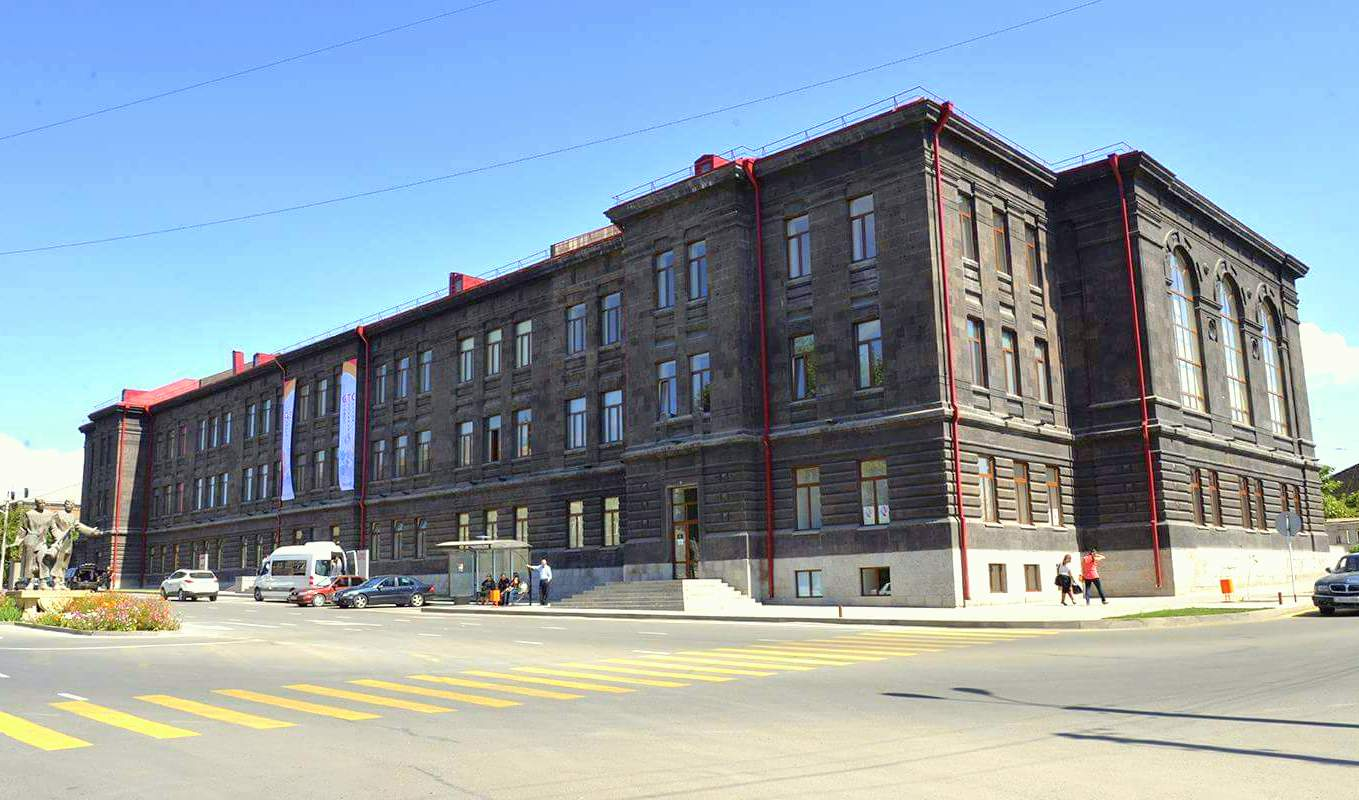
Gyumri Technology Center

Gyumri has a large number of educational institutions, following the capital Yerevan in the number of educational institutions. It is considered the cultural and educational center of northern Armenia.

As of 2017, Gyumri is home to the following higher educational centers:

- Shirak State University named after Mikael Nalbandian, opened in 1934 and is currently home to 7 faculties.
- Gyumri campus of the National Polytechnic University of Armenia, operating since 1959 with 2 faculties:
  - Faculty of Technologies and sectoral economics,
  - Faculty of Natural sciences and communication systems.
- Gyumri campus of Komitas State Conservatory of Yerevan, operating since 1988.
- Progress Gyumri University, opened in 1990.
- Shirakatsy campus of Haybusak University of Yerevan, operating since 1991.
- Imastaser Anania Shirakatsi University, opened in 1992.
- Gyumri campus of Armenian State University of Economics, operating since 1997.
- Gyumri campus of Yerevan State Academy of Fine Arts, operating since 1997.
- Gyumri campus of Yerevan State Institute of Theatre and Cinematography, operating since 1997.

In 2014, the Gyumri Technology Center was opened in the city, in an attempt to turn Gyumri into a regional and international center of information and high technologies.

The Gyumri branch of Tumo Center for Creative Technologies was opened in May 2015, following a fundraising initiative by Shant TV. After three years of renovations, the center was moved to its permanent location, the historic theater building of Gyumri, in 2020.

As of 2017, the city is home to 47 public education schools, 23 pre-school kindergartens, as well as 7 special schools for music.

== Sport ==
=== Football ===
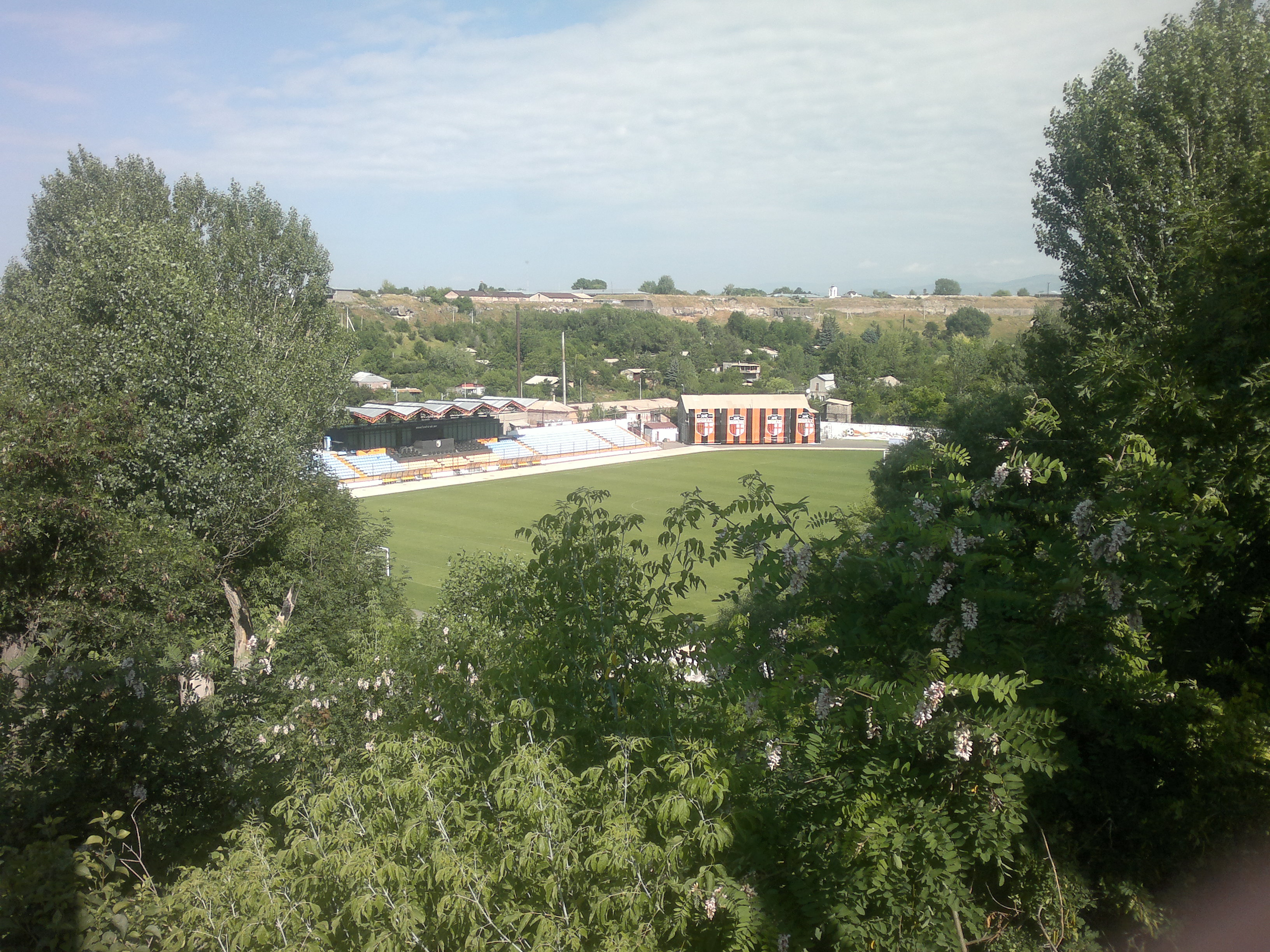
Gyumri City Stadium

Gyumri is home to the Armenian football club FC Shirak. They play their home games at the Gyumri City Stadium, the oldest football stadium in Armenia dating back to 1924. Shirak are one of the most popular football teams in Armenia, having won the championship of the Armenian Premier League four times, with the most recent one in the 2012–13 season. Shirak have also won the Armenian Independence Cup once. The native of Gyumri and former Shirak player Artur Petrosyan was the all-time leading scorer for the Armenia national football team until his record was surpassed by Henrikh Mkhitaryan in 2013.

Aragats FC was the second football club that represented the city. However, the club was dissolved in 2002 due to financial difficulties.

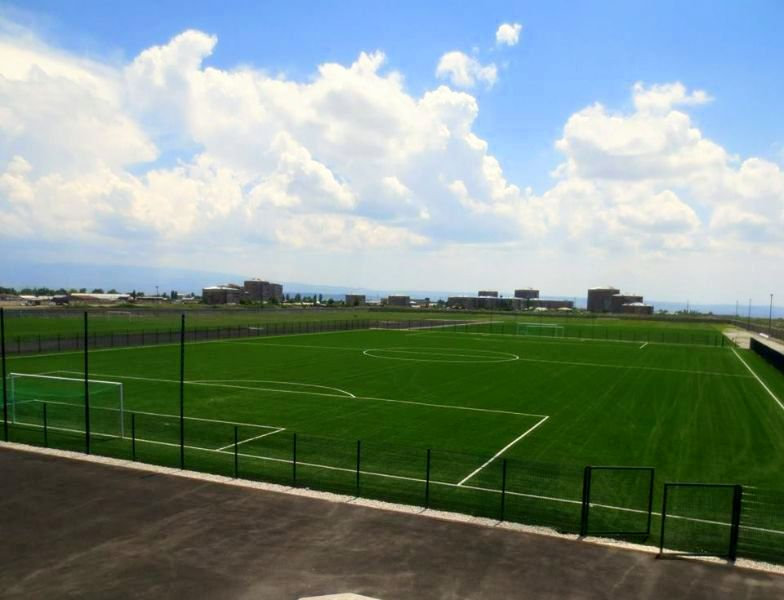
Gyumri Football Academy

The Gyumri Football Academy of the Football Federation of Armenia was opened on 13 September 2014. It is home to four natural-grass and two artificial turf regular-sized football training pitches.

=== Futsal ===
Futsal is also very popular in Gyumri. Being one of the most successful Futsal teams in Armenia, FC Gyumri played at the Armenian Futsal Premier League. Starting from 2017–18 season, FC Gyumri became known as Shirak Futsal, representing the futsal branch of FC Shirak. The newly founded Sh.S.U. Futsal -representing the Shirak State University- will also participate in the domestic league competition. The futsal teams of Gyumri regularly play their home games at the Armen Sargsyan Sports Hall, located in the Ani district at the northwest of the city.

=== Olympic individual sports ===
Gyumri has made a major contribution to the sporting life of Armenia. Many Olympic and world champion wrestlers, weightlifters and boxers are from Gyumri. The city is notable for its worldwide champions in individual sports, such as Robert Emmiyan in long jump, Yurik Vardanyan and Nazik Avdalyan in weightlifting and Artur Aleksanyan in Greco-Roman wrestling.

Many special sport schools are serving the young generation of Gyumri such as the Robert Emmiyan school of athletics, Levon Ishtoyan football school, Tigran Petrosian school of chess, Ludvig Mnatsakanyan school of winter sports, Artur Aleksanyan school of wrestling, Yurik Vardanyan school of weightlifting, Aleksan Haobyan school of tennis and table tennis, as well as other special schools for boxing, artistic gymnastics, sambo-judo, fencing, and chess. The city is also home to the Gyumri Swimming Complex. The National Federation of Black Belts of Aikido (NFBBA) is based in Gyumri since its establishment in 2012.

The Gyumri State Sports College of Olympic Reserve and Gyumri School of Sport Masters are among the prominent sport schools in Armenia that produced many champions in several individual sports.

== Twin towns – sister cities ==
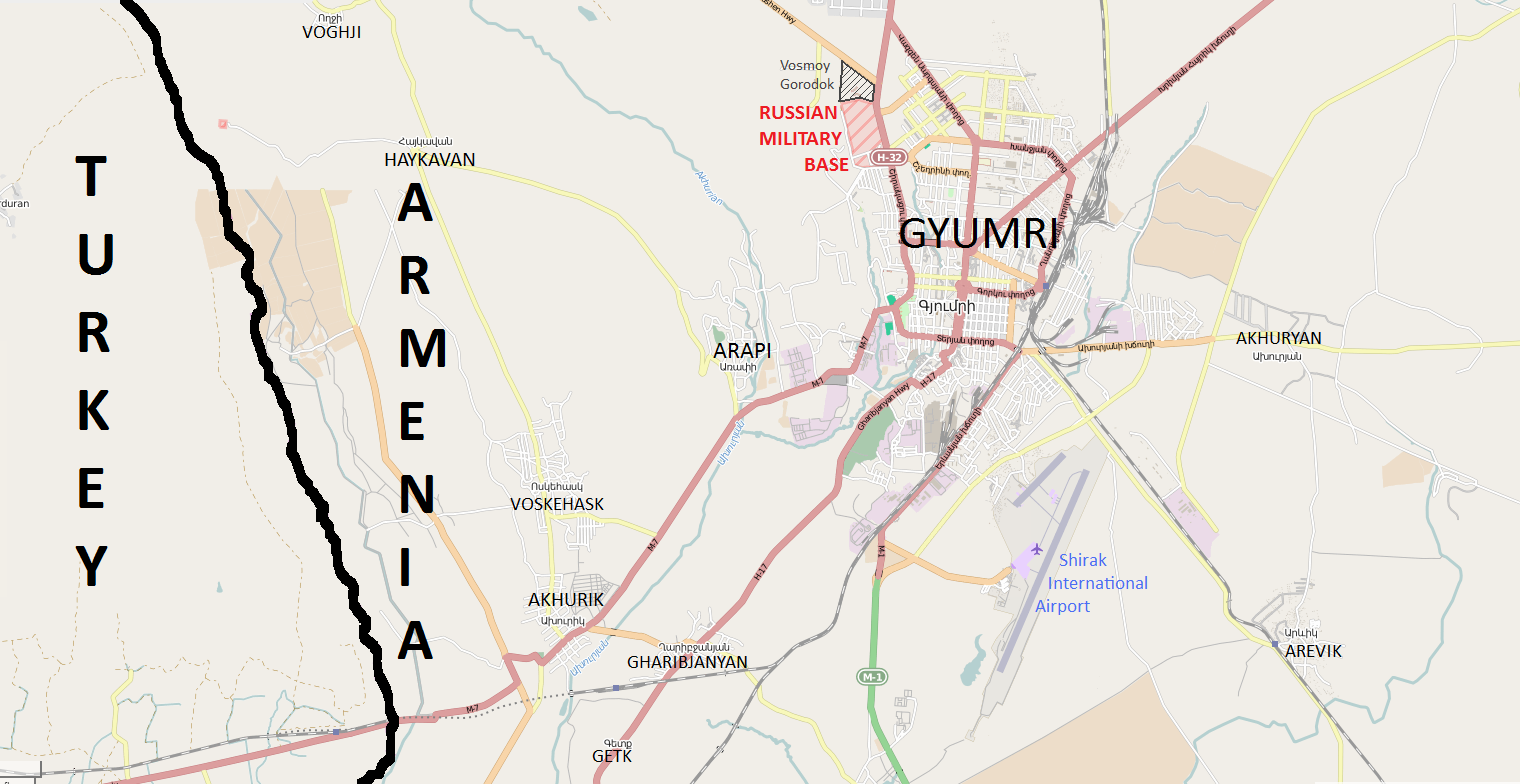
Map of Gyumri

Gyumri is twinned with:

- Alexandria, United States (1990)
- Ashfield, United Kingdom (1998)
- Białystok, Poland (2013)
- Créteil, France (2009)
- Domodedovo, Russia (2014)
- Glendale, United States (2015)
- Halle, Germany (2020)
- Mozdok, Russia (2011)
- Nardò, Italy (2013)
- Osasco, Brazil (2006)
- Petah Tikva, Israel (2019)
- Pitești, Romania (2012)
- Plovdiv, Bulgaria (2004)
- Tver, Russia (2022)
- Xi'an, China (2013)

== People ==
- Grigor Aghababyan, architect
- Artur Aleksanyan, Olympic, European and world champion in wrestling
- Mourad Amirkhanian, opera singer (bass-baritone)
- Mkrtich Armen, Armenian novelist
- Mkrtich Arzumanyan Armenian actor
- Mariam Aslamazian, Soviet-Armenian painter
- Khachatur Avetisyan, Armenian composer
- Nazik Avdalyan, weightlifting world champion
- Olga Chekhova, Russian actress
- Robert Emmiyan, European long jump record holder
- Bagrat Galstanyan, Armenian theologian and cleric
- Alik Gunashian, popular singer
- George Gurdjieff, mystic and philosopher
- Tigran Hamasyan, jazz pianist and composer
- Avetik Isahakyan, Armenian poet
- Mnatsakan Iskandaryan, wrestling Olympic champion (1992)
- Levon Ishtoyan, footballer, Soviet champion with FC Ararat (1973)
- Levon Julfalakyan, wrestling Olympic champion (1988)
- Araksya Karapetyan, Armenian-American TV anchor
- Emil Kazaz, Armenian-American sculptor
- Karekin Khajag, journalist, victim of the genocide
- Edmond Keosayan, film director
- Hayk Kotanjian, Armenian military diplomat
- Shushanik Kurghinian, Armenian influential writer
- Vazgen Manukyan, former Prime Minister of Armenia
- Flora Martirosian, Armenian folk songs performer
- Satenik Matinian-Arghutian, teacher and revolutionary leader
- Sergey Merkurov, Soviet sculptor
- Israel Militosyan, weightlifting Olympic champion (1992)
- Ashot Mkhitaryan, weightlifting trainer
- Levon Mkrtchyan, film director
- Mher Mkrtchyan, renowned actor
- Albert Nalchajyan, psychologist and writer
- Artavazd Peleshyan, film director
- Artur Petrosyan, footballer, manager of the Armenian team
- Samvel Sevada, painter and poet
- Sheram, gusan, poet and composer
- Hovhannes Shiraz, Armenian poet
- Nariné Simonian French-Armenian musical director
- Karen Smbatyan, Armenian painter
- Svetlana Svetlichnaya, actress
- Armen Tigranian, opera composer
- Nikoghayos Tigranian, composer and ethnomusicologist
- Gennady Timchenko, Russian businessman
- Seda Tutkhalyan, Russian gymnast
- Valmar, Armenian painter
- Yurik Vardanian, weightlifting Olympic champion (1980)
- Boris Vladimirov, Soviet Army officer
- Mkhitar Manukyan, world wrestling champion
- Meline Daluzyan, european weightlifting champion
- Tigran Vardan Martirosyan, european weightlifting champion
- Nazik Avdalyan, european and world weightlifting champion
- Arsen Julfalakyan, european and world wrestling champion
- Tigran Gevorg Martirosyan, world weightlifting champion
- Vahan Bichakhchyan, Armenian footballer

== See also ==
- Alexandropol Uyezd
- Sev Berd
- Russian 102nd Military Base
- List of Honorary Citizens of Gyumri

== Bibliography ==
- Der Matossian, Bedross (2020). The First Republic of Armenia (1918-1920): On its Centenary: Politics, Gender, and Diplomacy. Fresno: The Press at California State University. ISBN 978-0912201672. OCLC 1162163551.
- Hovannisian, Richard G (1967). Armenia on the Road to Independence, 1918. Berkeley: University of California Press. ISBN 978-0520005747. OCLC 1028172352.
