= Diocese of Shirak =

Diocese of Shirak Շիրակի թեմ
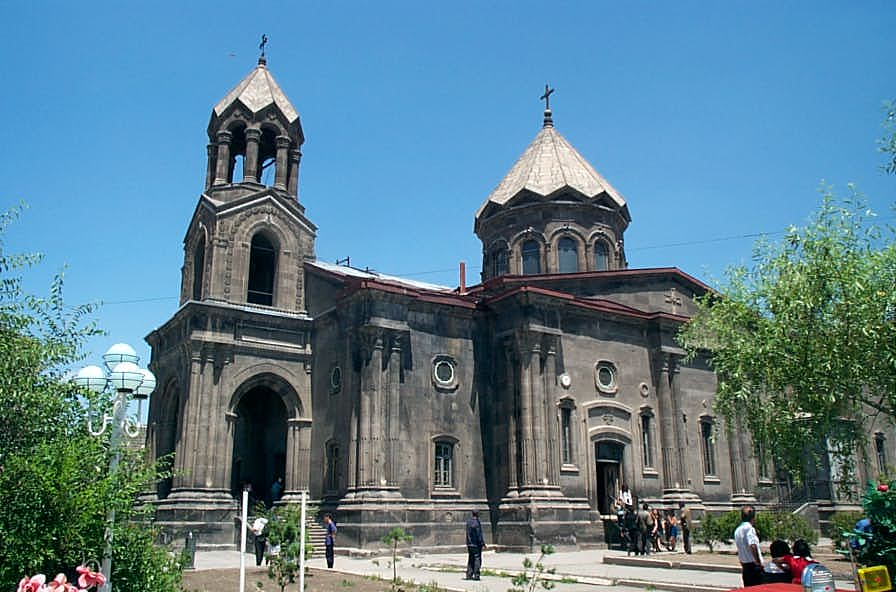
- Cathedral of the Holy Mother of God

Location
- Country: Armenia
- Territory: Shirak Province

Statistics
- Population: Total: (as of 2016 est.); ~192,000

Information
- Denomination: Armenian Apostolic Church
- Rite: Armenian Rite
- Established: 06 september 1920
- Cathedral: Holy Mother of God, Gyumri
- Secular priests: 21

Current leadership
- Patriarch: Karekin II
- Primate: Archbishop Mikael Ajapahyan

Website
- Official web

Diocese of Shirak (Armenian: Շիրակի թեմ Shiraki t'em), is one of the dioceses of the Armenian Apostolic Church covering the northern, central and south-western parts of the Shirak Province of Armenia. It almost covers 4/5th of the province, as the south-eastern town of Artik and its surrounding villages are excluded.

The diocese was officially founded on September 6, 1920, upon a kontakion issued by Catholicos George V. The seat of the diocese is the Cathedral of the Holy Mother of God in Gyumri. The prelacy building is located on Rizhkov and Varpetats streets near the cathedral, at the centre of Gyumri.

== History ==
In the final days of the First Republic of Armenia, the diocese was established upon a kontakion issued by Catholicos George V on September 6, 1920 after being separated from the Araratian Pontifical Diocese.

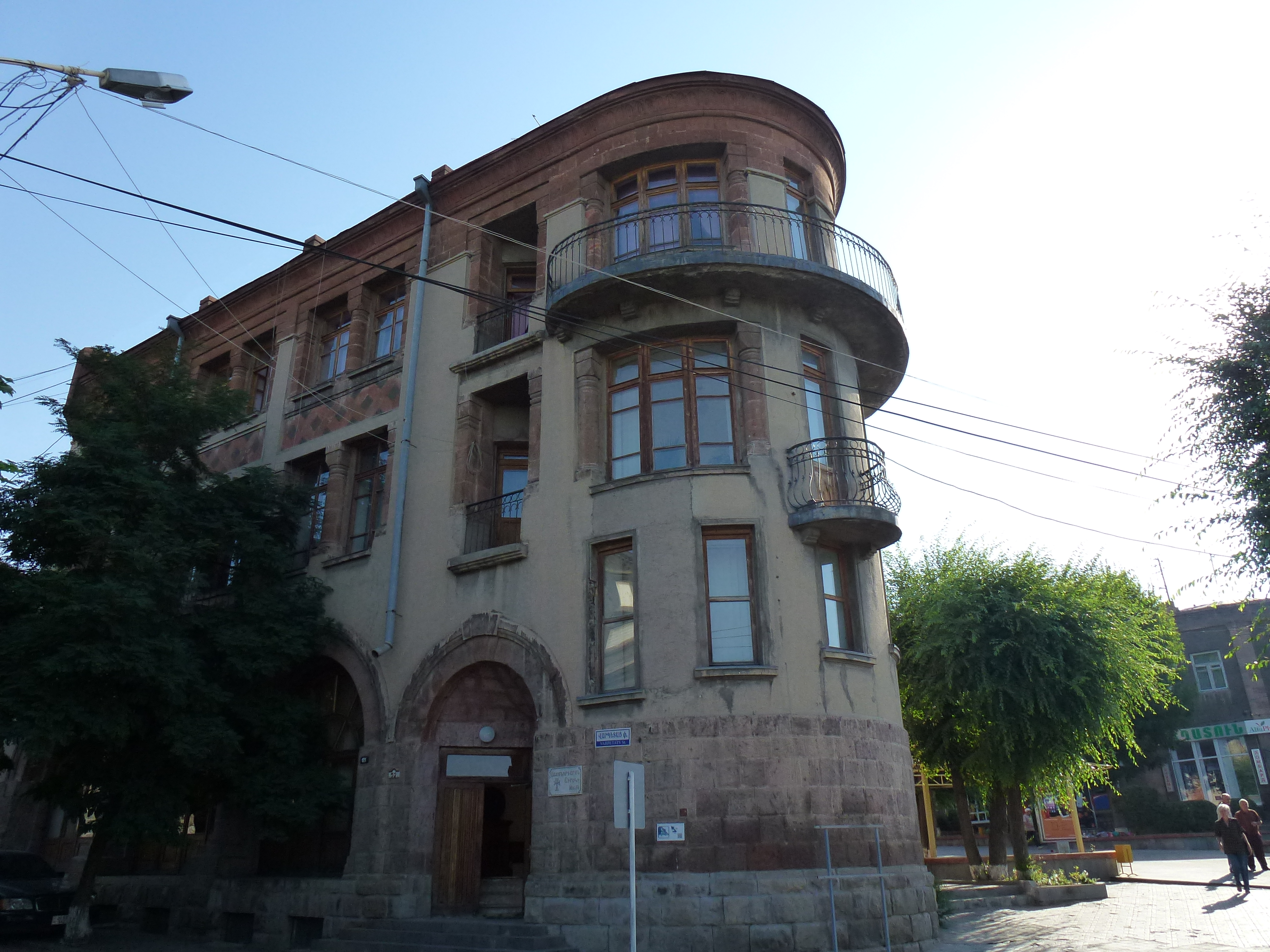
The prelacy building

The prelacy building of the Diocese of Shirak is located on Rizhkov and Varpetats Streets of Gyumri, near the Vartanants Square. It was designed by Hovhannes Katchaznouni and built at the beginning of the 20th century.

On December 2, 2012, the southern town of Artik and the surrounding 23 villages were separated from the Diocese of Shirak to form the newly established Diocese of Artik.

Currently, the diocese has 30 active churches under its jurisdiction in the city of Gyumri, along with many other churches in the Shirak Province. From 1999 the prelate is Archbishop Mikael Ajapahyan.
