= Dagger (13th–12th centuries BC, Artik) =

- Material: bronze
- Size: 44 cm × 4.6 cm (17.3 in × 1.8 in)
- Created: 13th–12th centuries BC
- Discovered: Artik, Armenia
- Present location: History Museum of Armenia
- Identification: 2346-331

The Dagger from the 13th to 12th centuries BC was discovered in Artik as a monolithic, wedge-shaped, blade dagger. It is kept in the History Museum of Armenia's collection under the number 2346-331.

== Description ==
The dagger is a single cast, bronze, wedge-shaped blade, measuring 44 cm × 4.6 cm (17.3 in × 1.8 in). The double-edged dagger is decorated on both sides with furrows and single embossed serpents crawling between them. It is made of a complex technical method, using two-tone metal (glowing reddish copper reliefs incrusted on a yellow surface). There is a running spiral carved on the upper widening part of the blade. The wrist holds a tubular, spherical head, where there are triangular partitions forming separate sections, preserving wooden inlays.

== See also ==
- A Glance from the Bronze Age. Yerevan, History Museum of Armenia, 2016, 160 pages.
