= Cathedral of the Holy Mother of God, Gyumri =

19th-century church

Cathedral of the Holy Mother of God
- Our Lady of Seven Wounds
- Սուրբ Աստվածածին Մայր Եկեղեցի
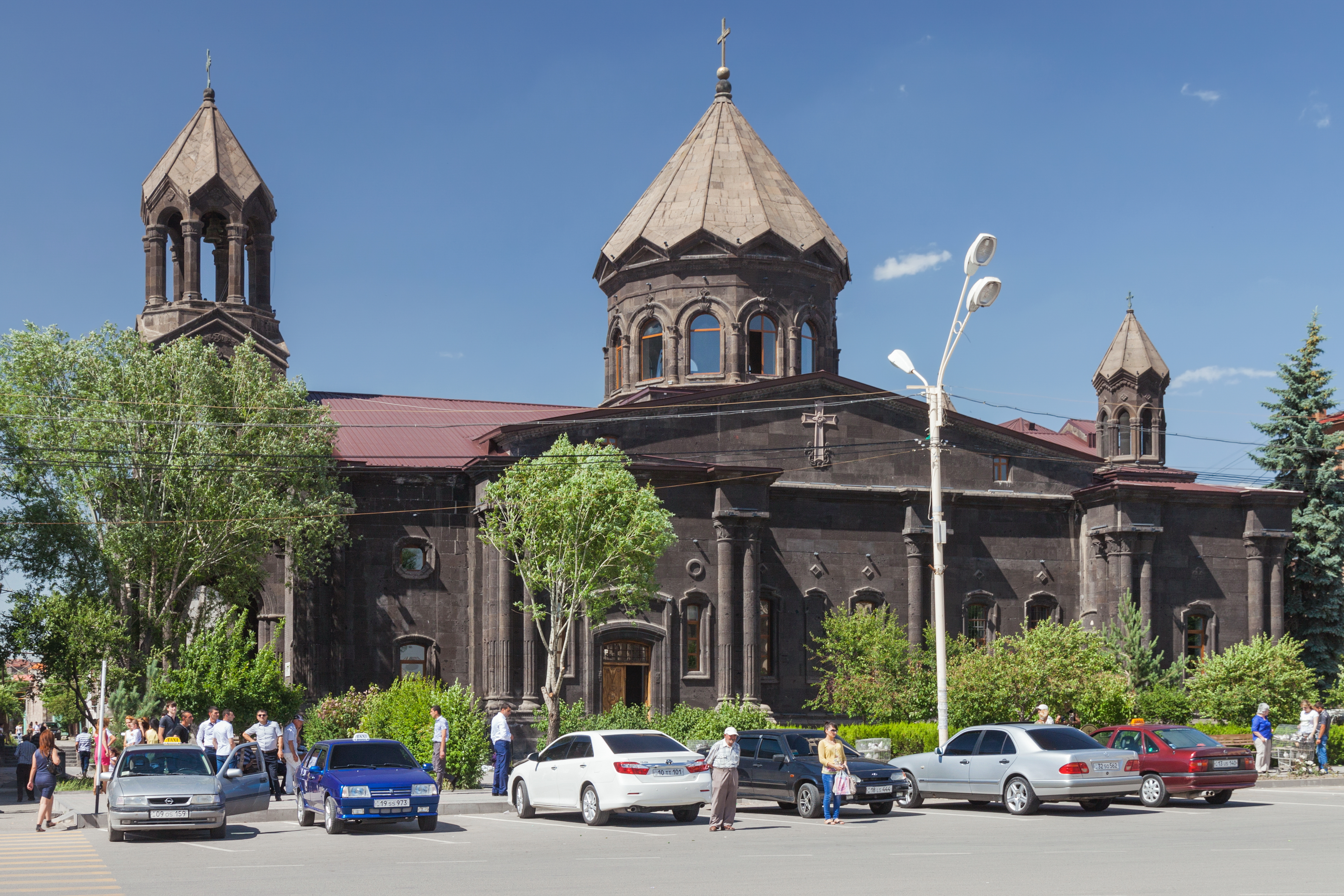
- The cathedral in 2014

- Location of the cathedral in Armenia
- Cathedral of the Holy Mother of God
- 40°47′10″N 43°50′32″E
- Location: Vartanants Square, Gyumri, Shirak Province
- Country: Armenia
- Denomination: Oriental Orthodox
- Sui iuris church: Nicene Christianity
- Churchmanship: Armenian Apostolic Church

History
- Status: Cathedral

Architecture
- Functional status: Active
- Architectural type: Armenian church
- Style: Cruciform rectangular
- Groundbreaking: 1873
- Completed: 1884; 142 years ago

Administration
- Diocese: Shirak

The Cathedral of the Holy Mother of God (Armenian: Սուրբ Աստվածածին Մայր Եկեղեցի), also known as the Our Lady of Seven Wounds (Armenian: Սուրբ Աստվածամոր Յոթ Վերք), is a 19th-century church in Gyumri, Armenia. Occupying the northern side of the Vartanants Square, the cathedral is the seat of the Diocese of Shirak of the Armenian Apostolic Church. The church was constructed between 1873 and 1884.

== Architecture ==
The Cathedral of the Holy Mother of God belongs to the Cruciform style of the Armenian churches with an external rectangular shape. The belfry is located at the top of the main entrance on the western side of the building. The church is topped with a large dome at the center surrounded with 2 minor domes. Unlike other Armenian churches, the altar at the Holy Mother of God is unique for its multi-iconic decoration.

The church remained active during the Soviet years.

After the 1988 Armenian earthquake, the two minor domes fell down and they were replaced with new ones. The fallen domes are currently placed in the church yard.

== Gallery ==
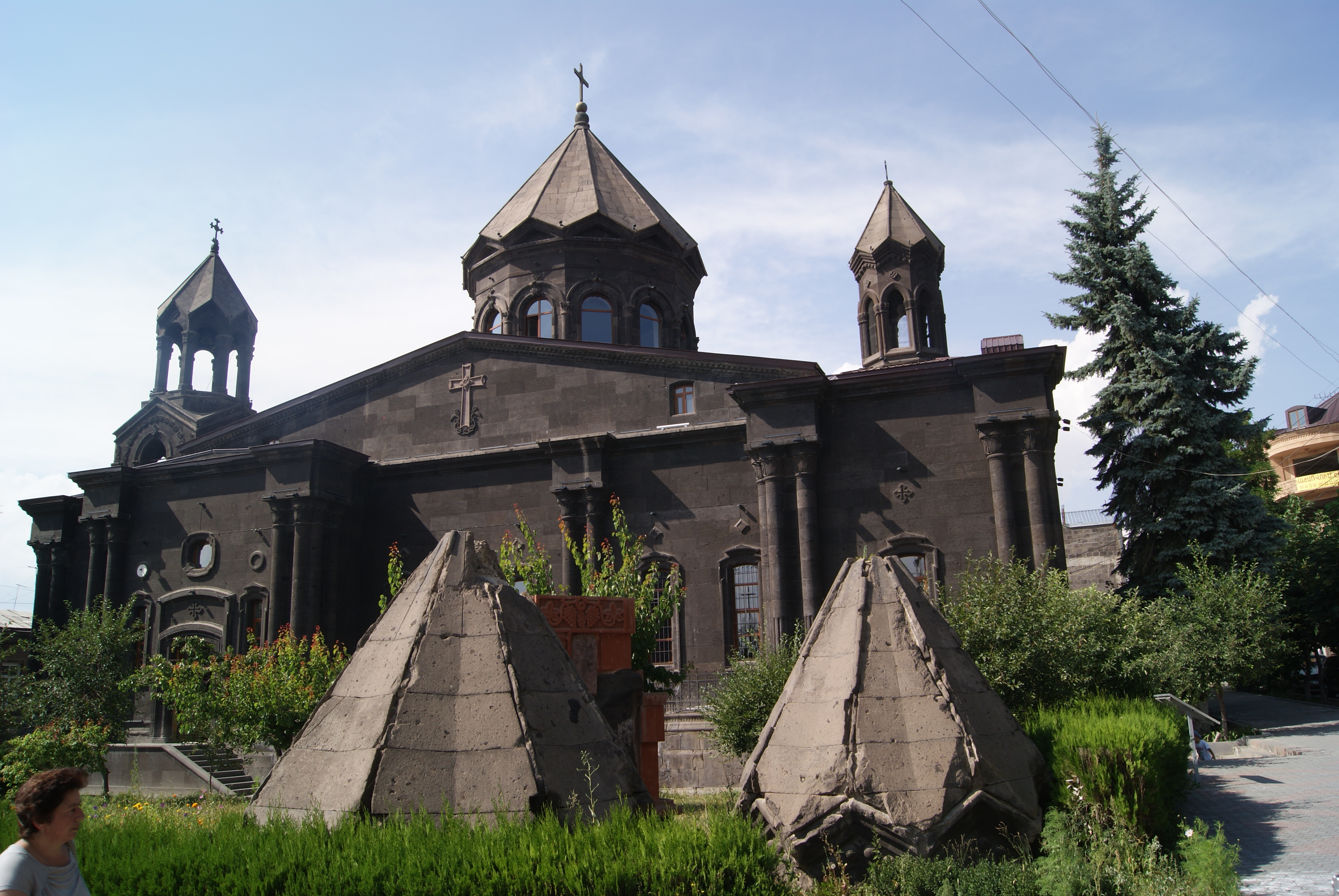
The church along with the fallen domes

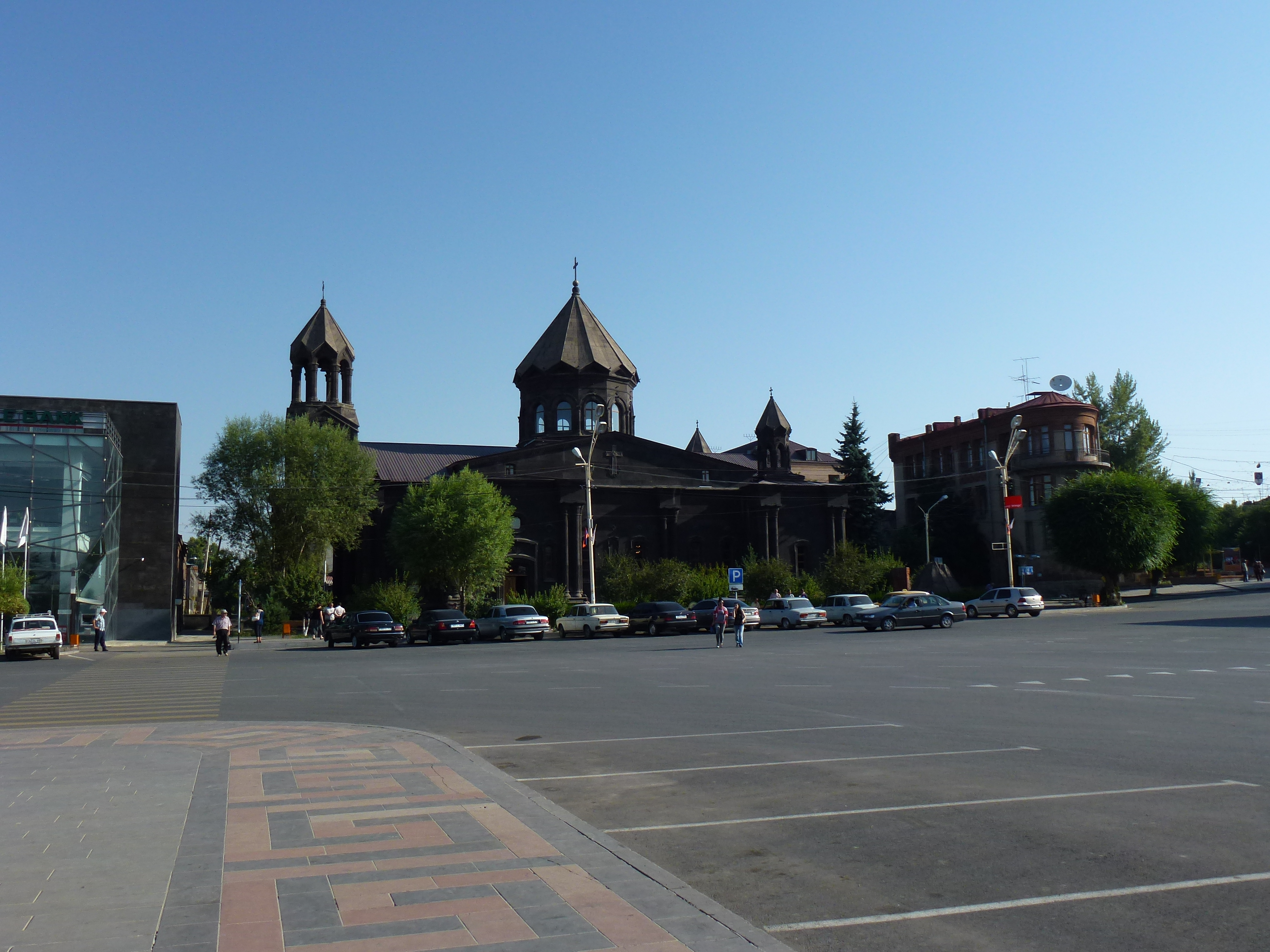
The church as seen from the square

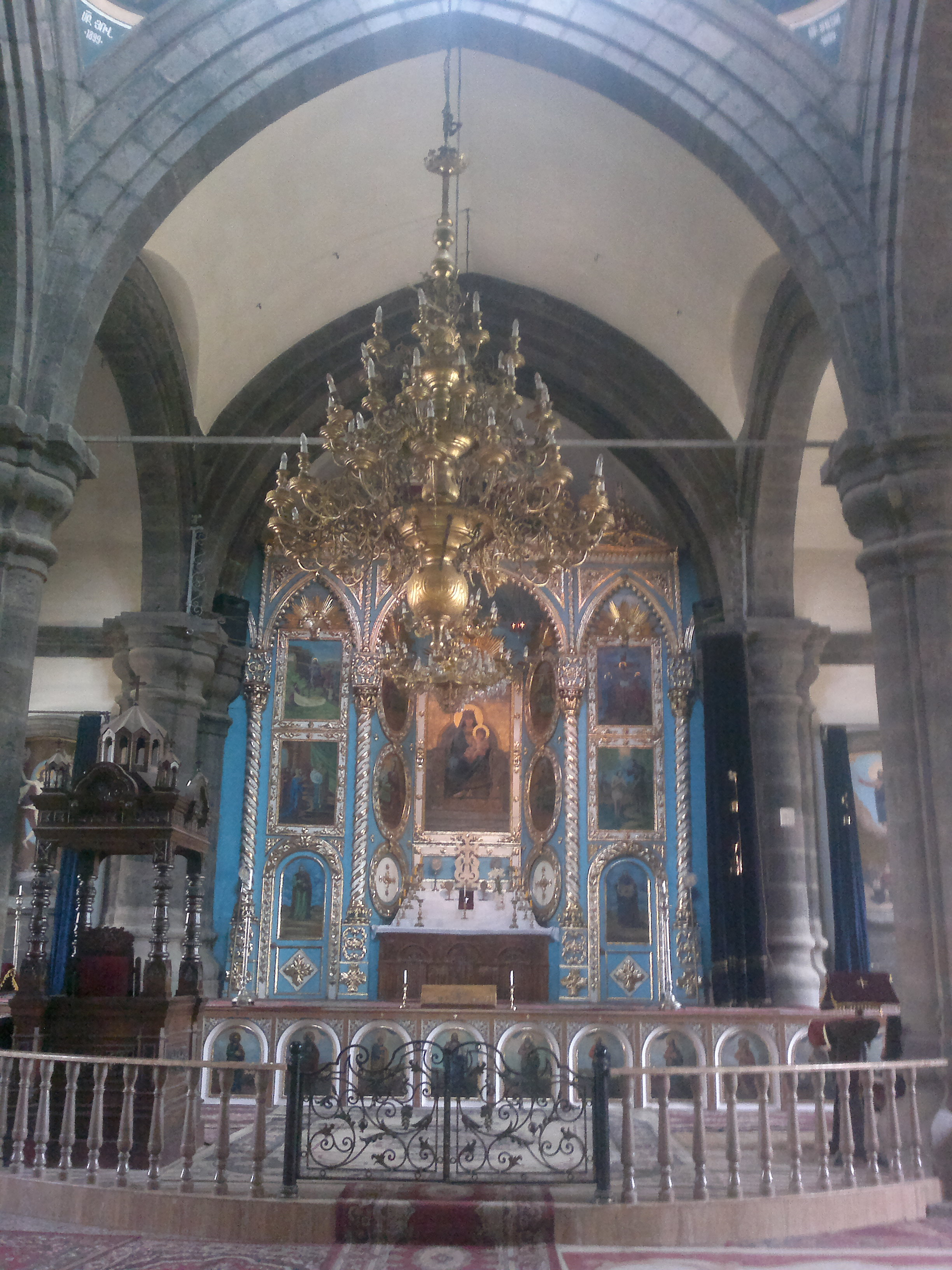
The altar
