= Lmbatavank =

Cultural heritage monument of Armenia

Saint Stephen Church of Lmbat Monastery Լմպատի վանքի Սուրբ Ստեփանոս եկեղեցի
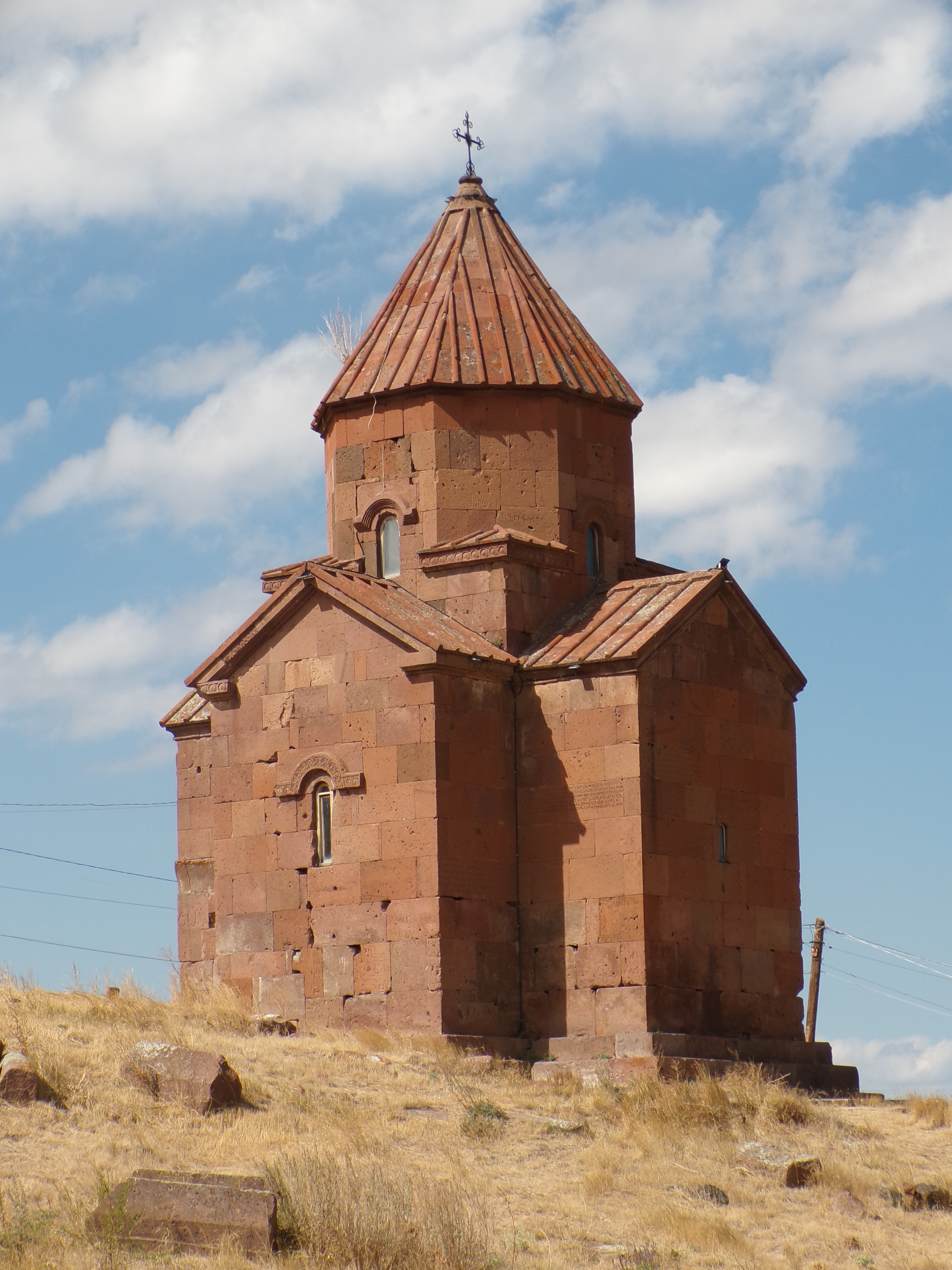
- Saint Stephen church

- Location within Armenia Location within Shirak

Religion
- Affiliation: Armenian Apostolic Church
- Status: active

Location
- Location: Artik, Shirak Province, Armenia
- Coordinates: 40.608354°N 43.957871°E

Architecture
- Type: Small cruciform central-plan
- Style: Armenian
- Completed: 7th-century

Specifications
- Direction of façade: west
- Dome: 1

The Saint Stephen Church of Lmbat Monastery (Armenian: Լմպատի վանքի Սուրբ Ստեփանոս եկեղեցի), more commonly known as Lmbatavank (Armenian: Լմբատավանք), is a church located on a hillside southwest of the town of Artik in the Shirak Province of Armenia. It was constructed in the 7th century and was dedicated to Saint Stephen.

== Architecture ==
The church of Saint Stephen has a cruciform centralised plan under a single octagonal drum with an octagonal-conical dome above. The four arms of the church have gable roofs. There is a single portal that leads into the building, and adjacent to the main entry of the church is another portal to a side chapel.

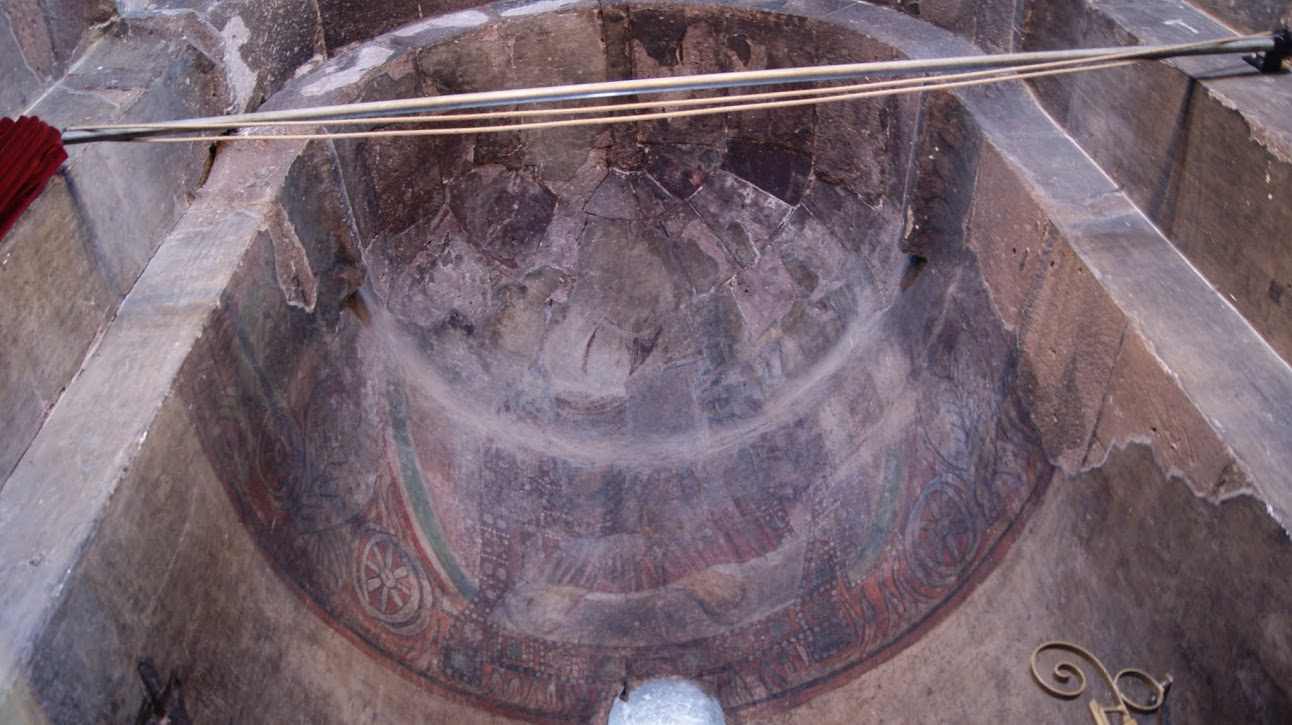
Frescoes painted upon the apse

Decorative elements are mostly circular shield-type patterns on the exterior of the structure, and are limited to the bell style arches above some of the windows, eaves, and cornices. On the eastern exterior façade of the church are some inscriptions, as well as a design of a low-relief cross pattée resting in the center of a circle located to the left of the lower window. This same cross variant can be seen on other churches in the Artik area; for example, on the rear façade of the 5th-century Surb Astvatsatsin Church/Surb Marine Church in the center of Artik, and also on the walls of the 7th-century Pemzashen Church.

The apse of the church has important 7th-century frescoes, with remnants of scenes depicting Jesus in the center surrounded by symbols of heavenly powers. There is also an image of Saint George riding on a horse while holding a staff topped with a cross.

Between 1955 and 1956 Saint Stephen was partially renovated. Excavations took place during 1960 to clear out the area in front of the church and under the stones: khachkars and a Bronze Age cemetery were uncovered. Some of these khachkars can be seen in and along the retaining walls next to the church. Other tombstones are nearby.

== Folklore ==
Local folklore tells that Turkish invading forces tried to fire a cannon at the church of Saint Stephen. After firing twice at the structure and missing their target, they tried once again and misfired the cannon in their own vicinity. The commander realized that what they were firing upon was actually a church and put an end to the attack.

In more recent years, the church door is said to have been stolen by a man who was seen carrying it away on his back. When asked by local residents, "What door is this?" he replied "The door to the church!" They told him to bring it back from where he took it, which he did. Since the door was taken from a holy place, it is said that he could not remove it from his back until he returned it to the church because it was stuck.

== Gallery ==
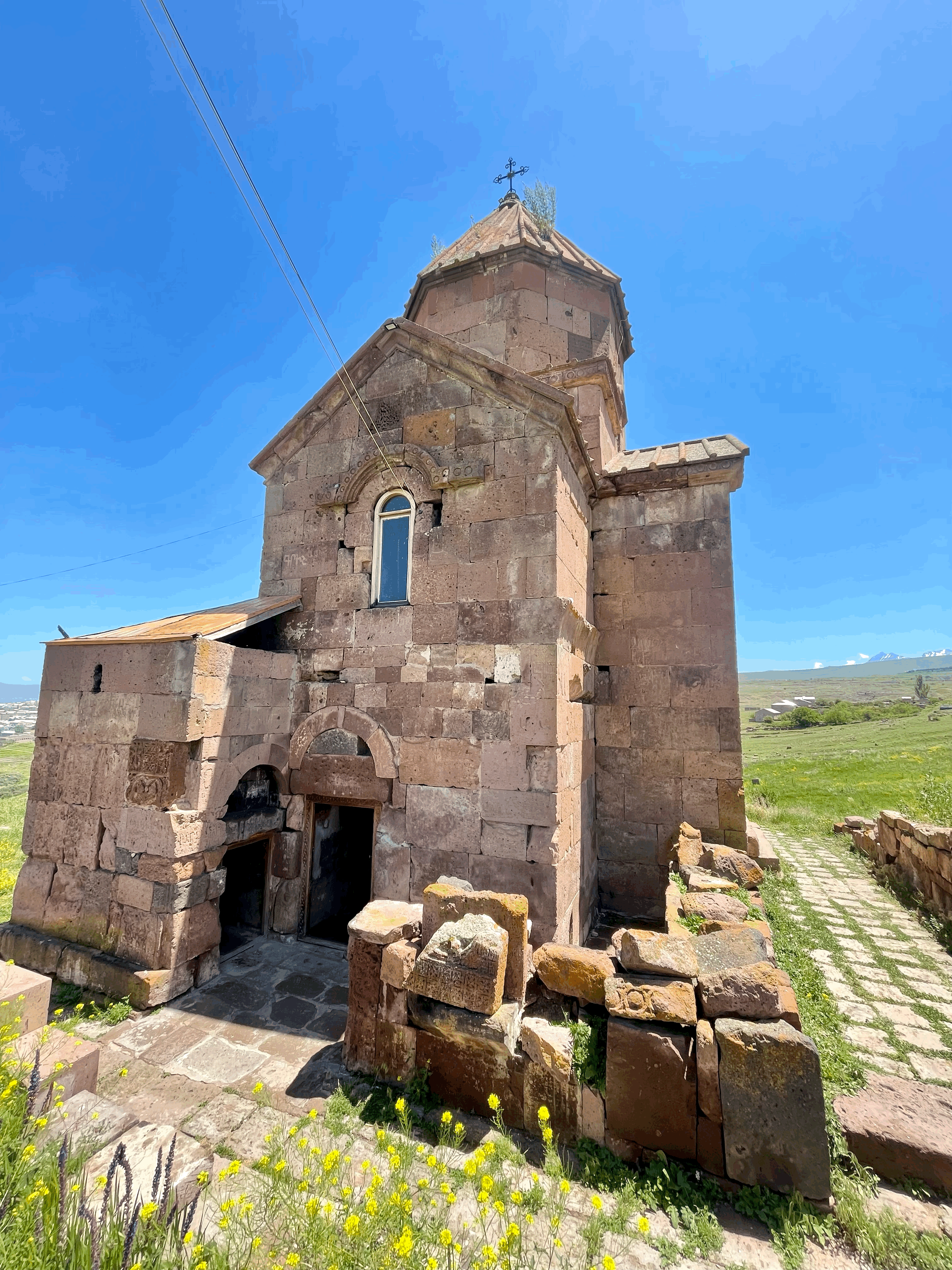
Exterior view

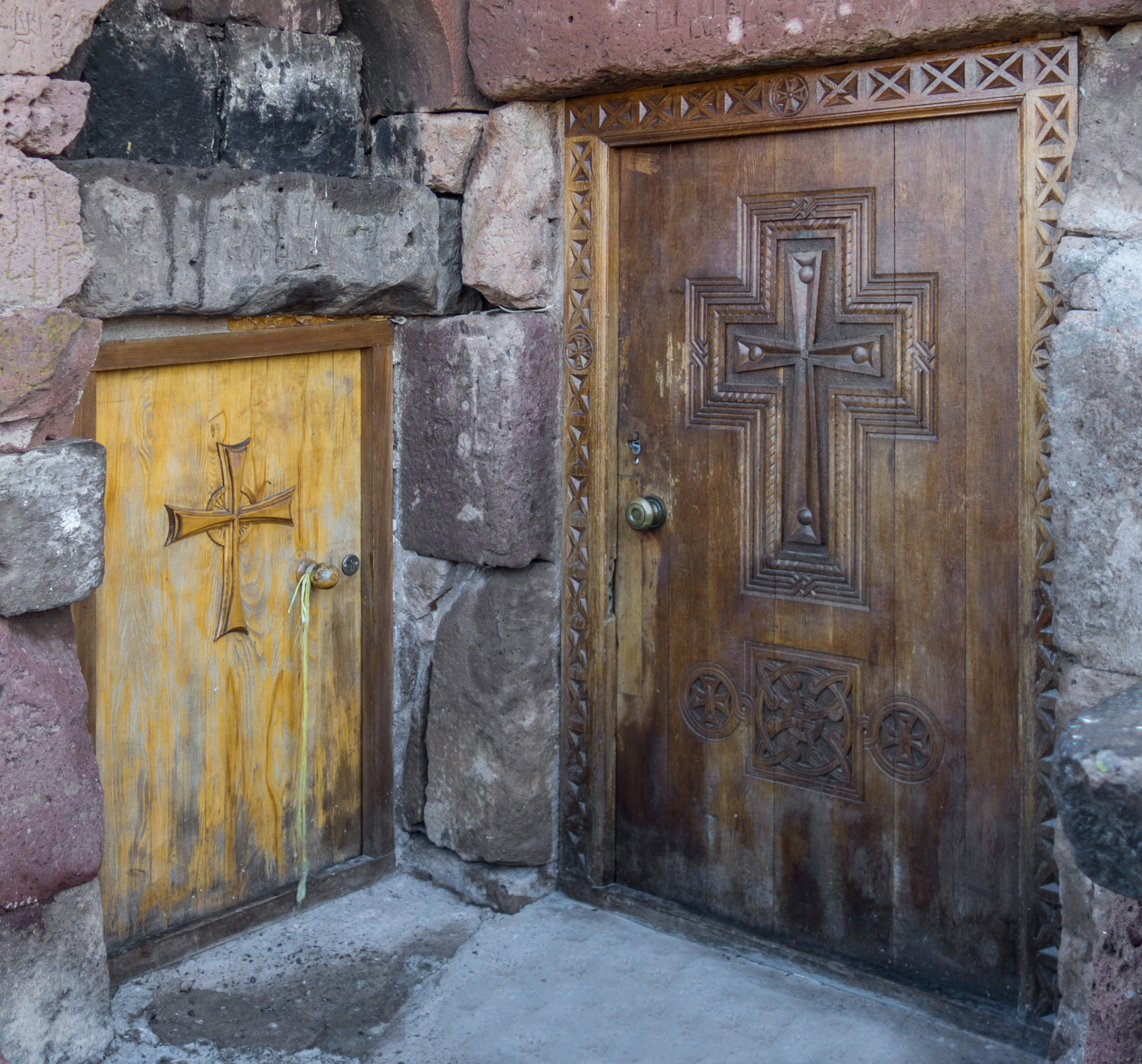
Doors

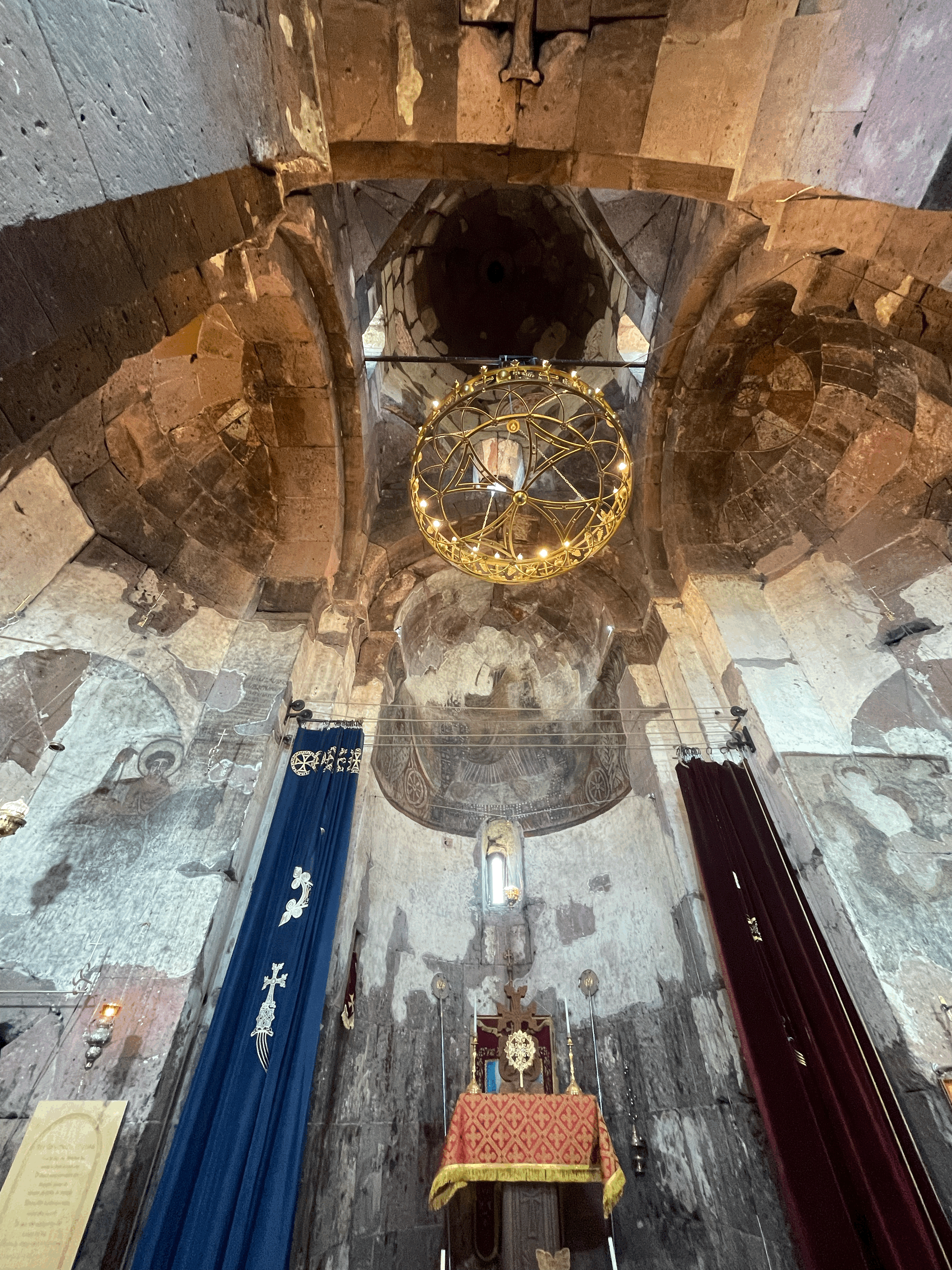
Altar and dome

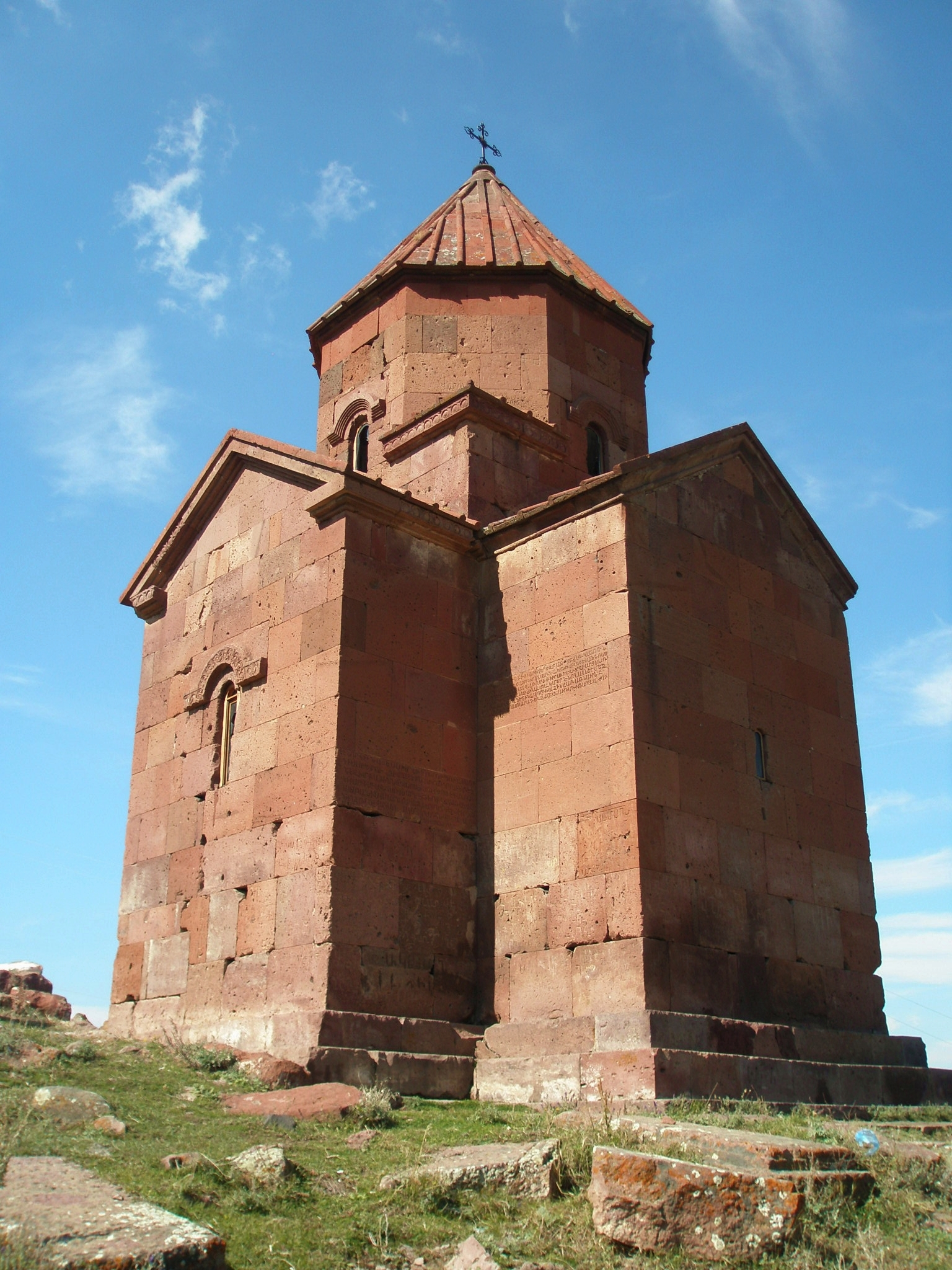
Southeastern façade

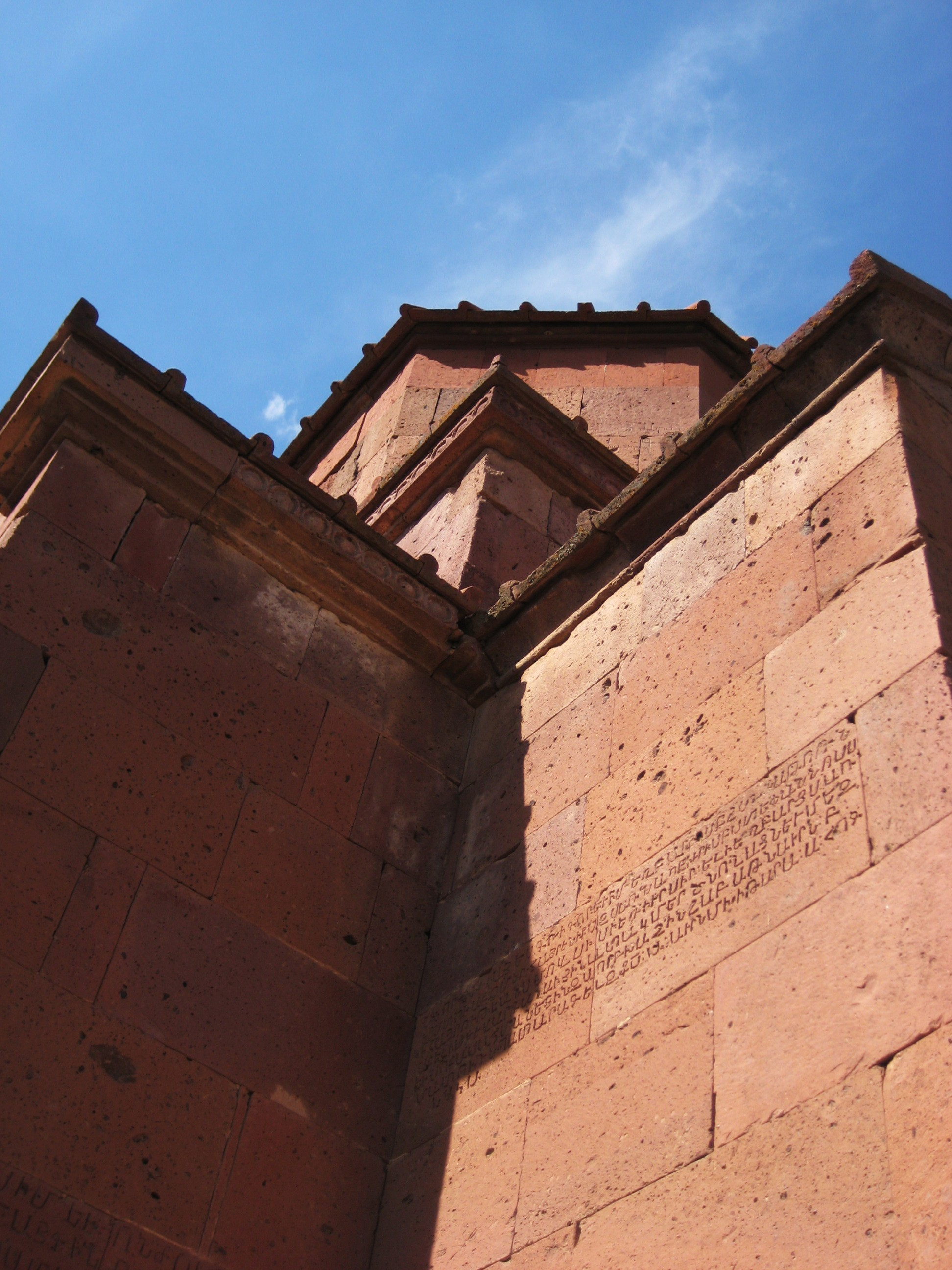
Southeastern façade details showing the circular shield pattern molding on the cornice and an inscription

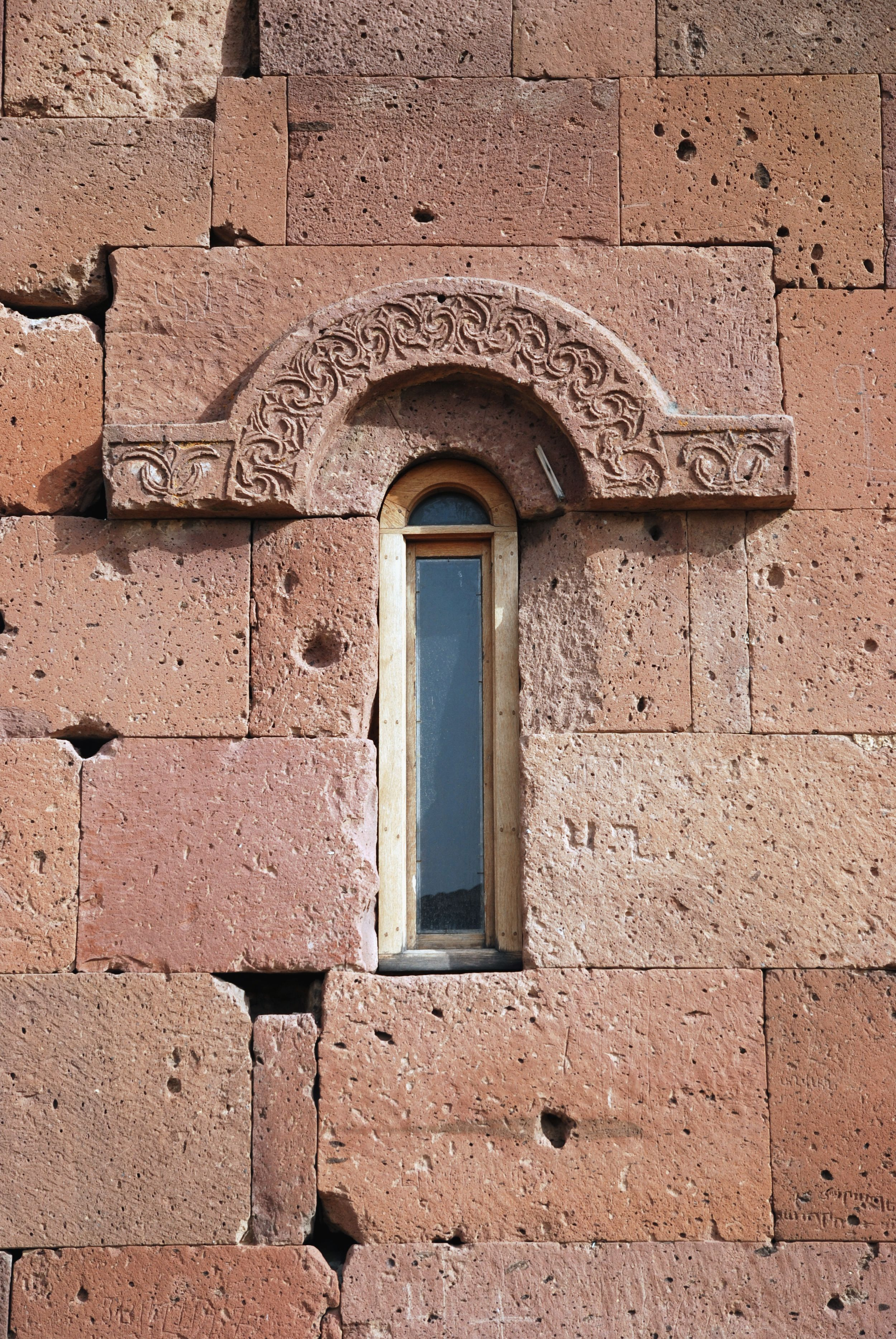
Southern window details

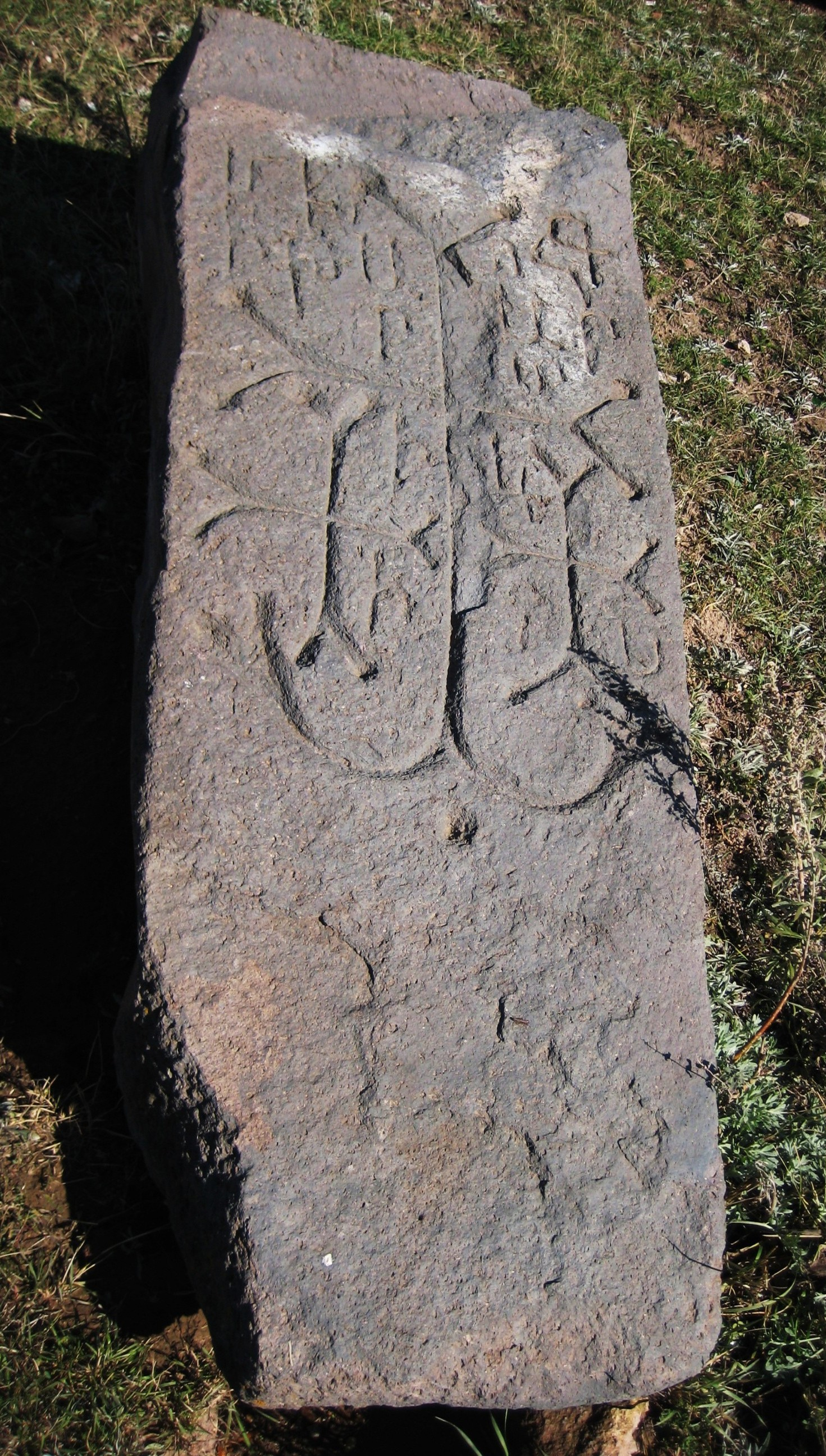
Tombstone in the adjacent cemetery
