= Holy Saviour's Church, Gyumri =

Historic Armenian Catholic church

Coordinates: 40°47′03″N 43°50′29″E

Holy Saviour's Church

- Location within Armenia

Religion
- Affiliation: Armenian Apostolic Church
- Year consecrated: 1873

Location
- Location: Vartanants Square, Gyumri, Armenia

Architecture
- Architect: Tadeos Andikyan
- Type: Armenian
- Style: Domed basilica
- Groundbreaking: 1858
- Completed: 1872

Specifications
- Height (max): 36 m
- Dome: 1

Holy Saviour's Church (Armenian: Սուրբ Ամենափրկիչ Եկեղեցի), is a 19th-century church in Gyumri, Armenia. It occupies the southern side of the Vartanants Square at the centre of Gyumri. It was constructed between 1858 and 1872 and consecrated in 1873.

== History ==
During the 1850s, an Armenian Catholic church and a Greek Orthodox church were built at the centre of Alexandropol-Gyumri. Feeling insulted of this fact, the devotees of the Armenian Apostolic Church (who constituted the majority of the city's population) decided to build a new church right in the middle of the 2 churches that existed, which would look larger and more imposing. The construction of the church was launched in 1858 led by architect Tadeos Andikyan who was known as the master of masters and the oustabashi. It was completed in 1872 and consecrated in 1873. The construction was fulfilled through the donations of the population of Alexandropol and the Drampyan family. The design of the church was derived from the architecture of the Cathedral of Ani. However the Holy Saviour Church is much larger than the Cathedral of Ani.

The church survived from the 1926 earthquake. At beginning of the 1930s, it was confiscated by the Soviet government and the belfry was destroyed in 1932. Later in 1964, the belfry was restored. However, during Soviet rule, the church building was used as a museum, and later as a classical music concert hall.

During the devastating 1988 earthquake, the Church of the Holy Saviour was severely damaged and underwent entire renovation from 2002. Re-consecration of the cathedral took place in December 2024.

== Gallery ==
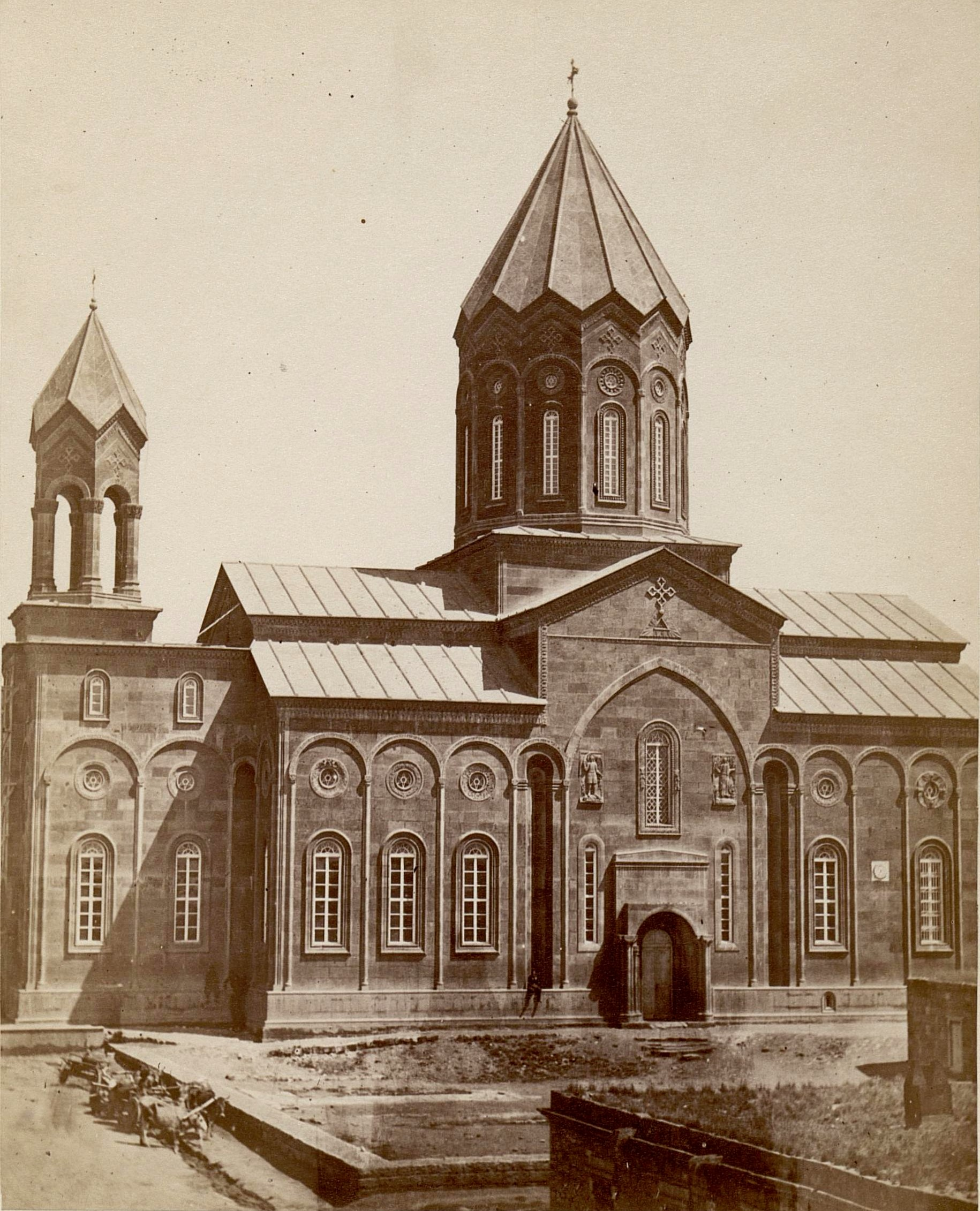
The church in 1870–1880

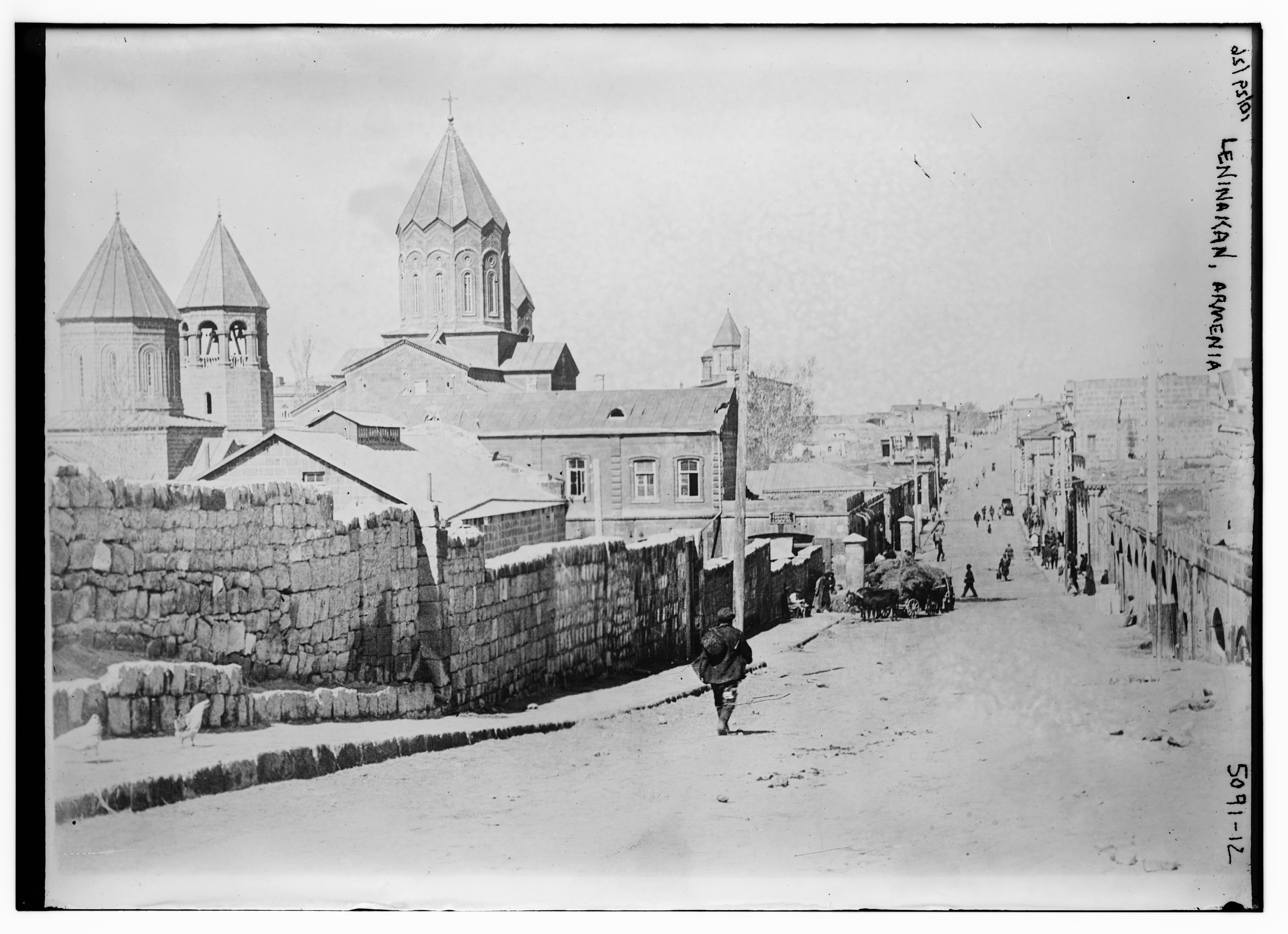
The church in 1926

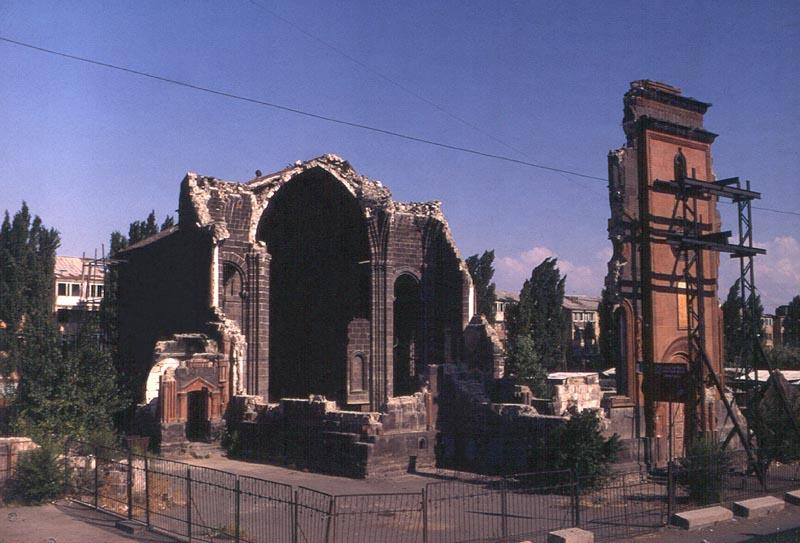
After the 1988 earthquake

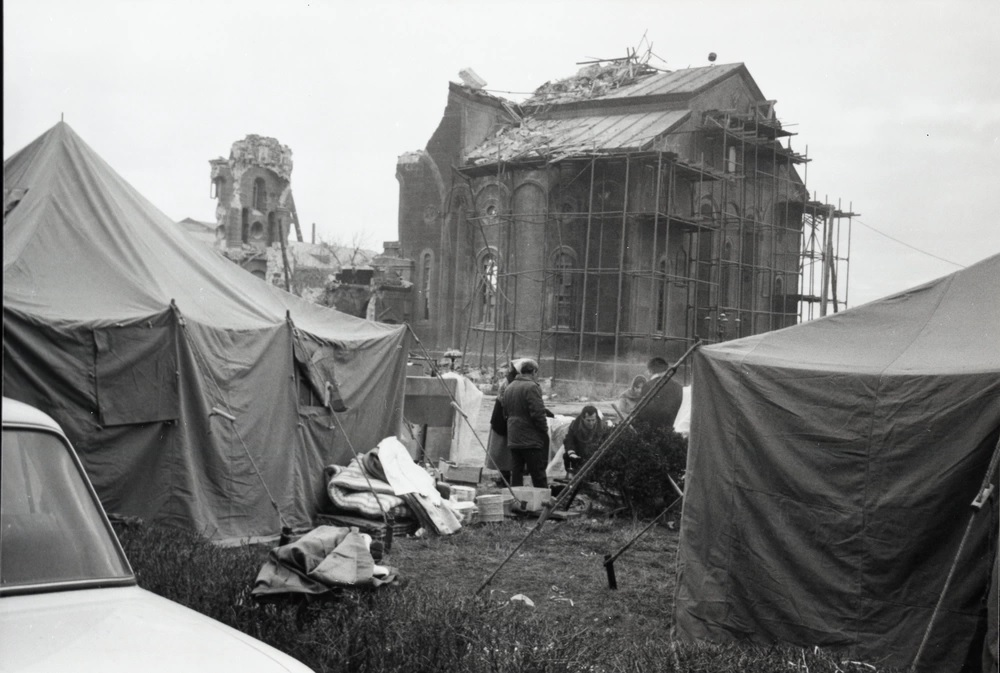

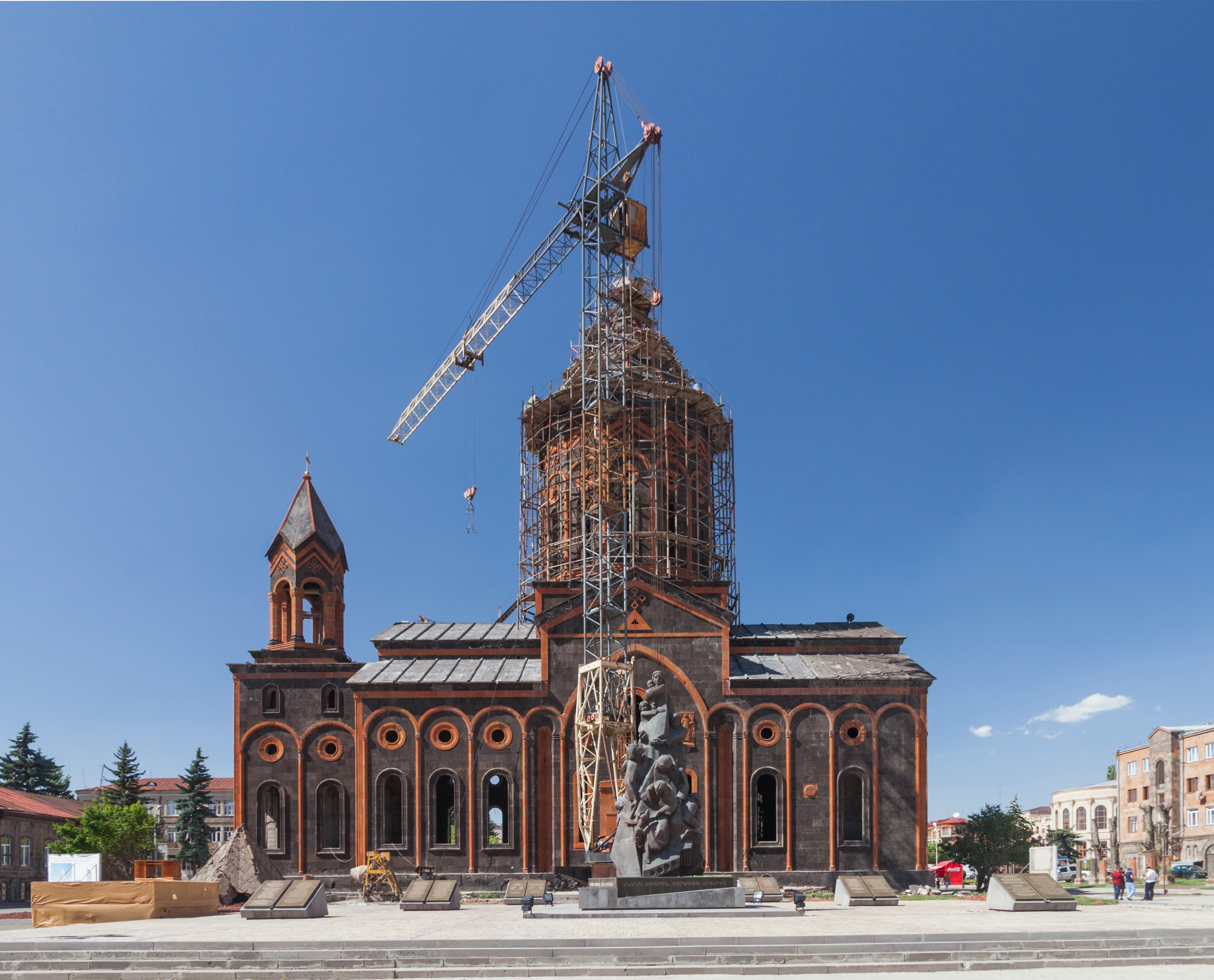
Church during the reconstruction in June 2014

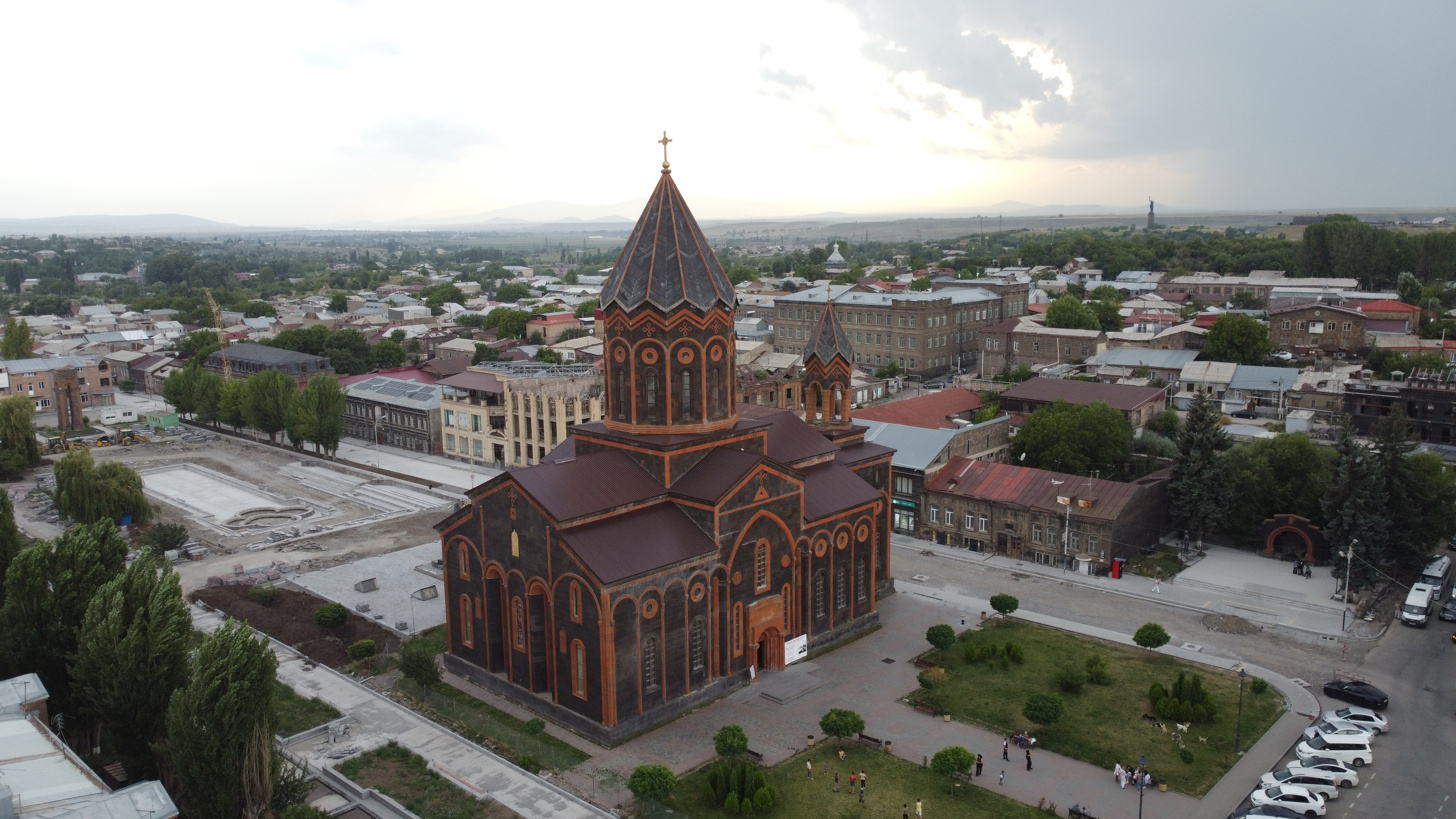
Aerial image in 2024
