= Arshavir II Kamsarakan =

5th century Armenian prince

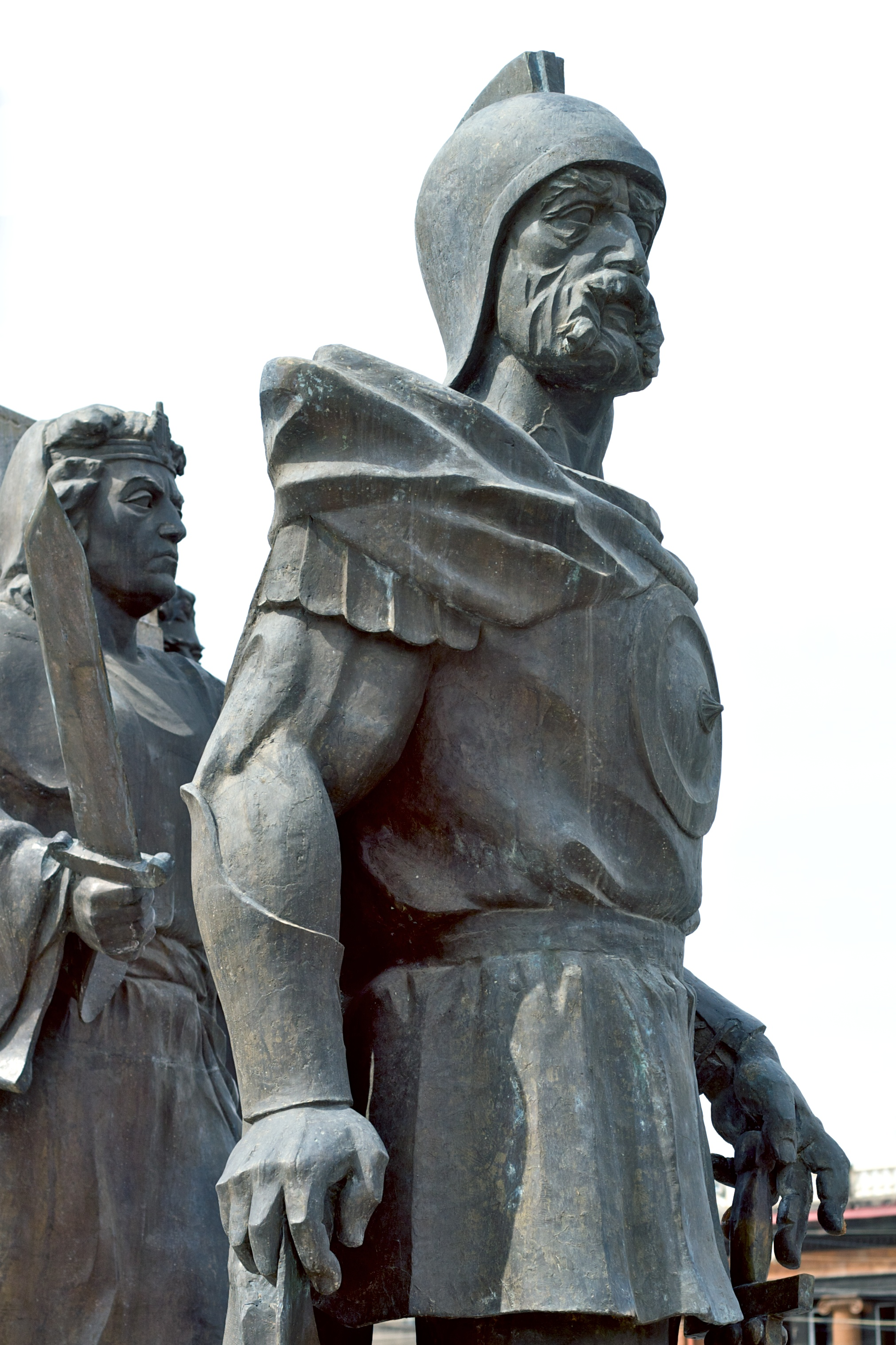
Modern statue of Arshavir II in the Vartanants Square, Gyumri, Armenia

Arshavir II Kamsarakan (Armenian: Արշավիր Կամսարական) was an Armenian prince from the Kamsarakan family. He was the son of Gazavon II, who immigrated to Sasanian-controlled Armenia following the Roman annexation of the western part of historic Armenia. Arshavir II is notable for having taken part in the anti-Sasanian revolt of 451, led by his father-in-law Vardan Mamikonian. He later died about 460. He was succeeded by his son Narses, who later took part in the insurrection of 482 to 484, led by Vardan's nephew Vahan Mamikonian.

== Bibliography ==
=== Ancient works ===
- Ghazar Parpetsi, History of the Armenians.

=== Modern works ===
- Chaumont, M. L. (1986). "Armenia and Iran ii. The pre-Islamic period". Encyclopædia Iranica, online edition, Vol. II, Fasc. 4. pp. 418–438.
- Toumanoff, Cyril (1990). Les dynasties de la Caucasie Chrétienne: de l'Antiquité jusqu'au XIXe siècle : tables généalogiques et chronologiques. pp. 1–600. ISBN 9781400832866.
- Toumanoff, Cyril (2010). "Kamsarakan". Encyclopædia Iranica, online edition, Vol. XV, Fasc. 5. pp. 453–455.
