= Artik =

City in Shirak, Armenia

Artik Արթիկ
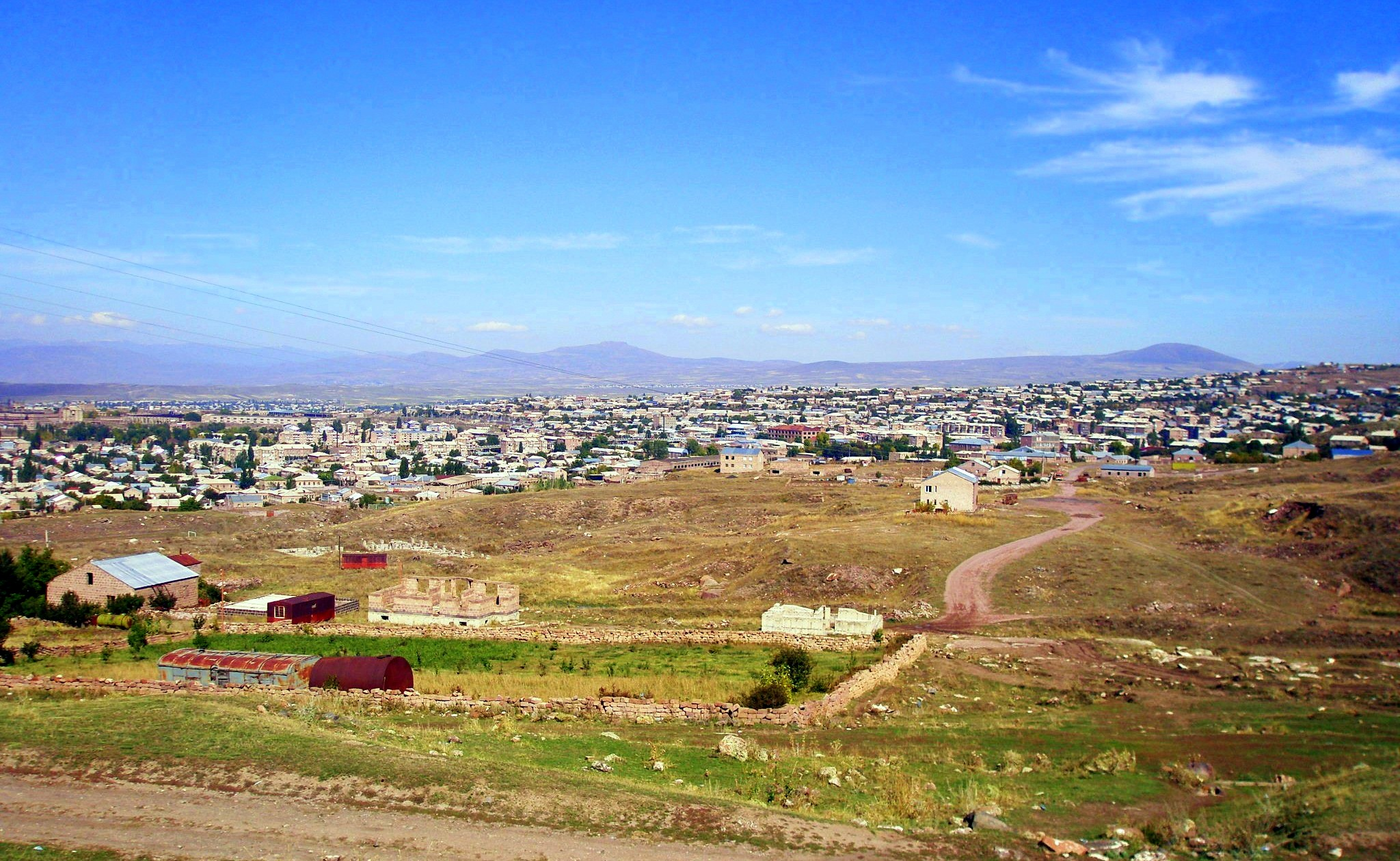
- Artik in October 2009

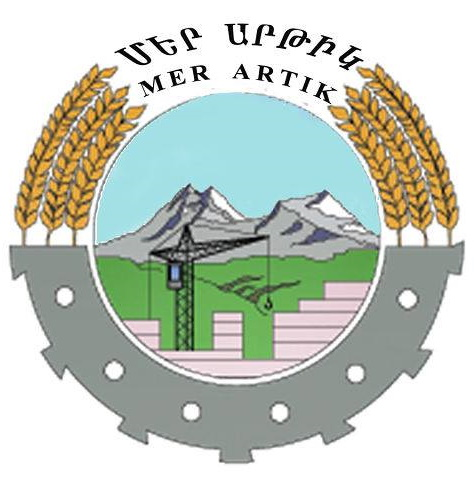
- Coat of arms

- Location within Armenia Location within Shirak
- Coordinates: 40°37′02″N 43°58′33″E
- Country: Armenia
- Province: Shirak
- Municipality: Artik
- Founded: 5th century

Area
  - Total: 7 km^{2} (2.7 sq mi)
- Elevation: 1,859 m (6,099 ft)

Population (2022 census)
  - Total: 17,647
  - Density: 2,500/km^{2} (6,500/sq mi)
- Time zone: UTC+4 (GMT)
- Postal code: 3001-3007
- Area code: (+374) 244
- Climate: Dfb
- Website: Official website

Artik (Armenian: Արթիկ) is a town in the Artik Municipality of the Shirak Province of Armenia. As of the 2011 census, the town had a population of 19,534. As per the 2016 official estimate, the population of Artik was around 18,800. As of the 2022 census, the town had a population of 17,647.

Artik is famous for its tufa stones, mainly the pink and rosy colored tufa. It is the main centre of tufa and travertine production in Armenia.

== Etymology ==
According to an 11th-century inscription found in Lmbatavank monastery of Artik, the town was known as Hartk (Յարդք) during the Middle Ages. It was later known as Ardik (Արդիկ), Ardik' (Արդիք) and Artik (Արթիկ). According to locals, the name consists of 2 parts: Ar derived from Mount Aragats, and tik meaning leaning in Armenian. Thus, the name Artik most probably means leaning on Aragats.

== History ==
According to archaeological excavations conducted during 1960 in the territory of modern-day Artik, it was revealed that the area has been settled since the 14th century BC. Cemeteries dating back to the Late Bronze Age were found under the layers of tufa limestone in Artik.

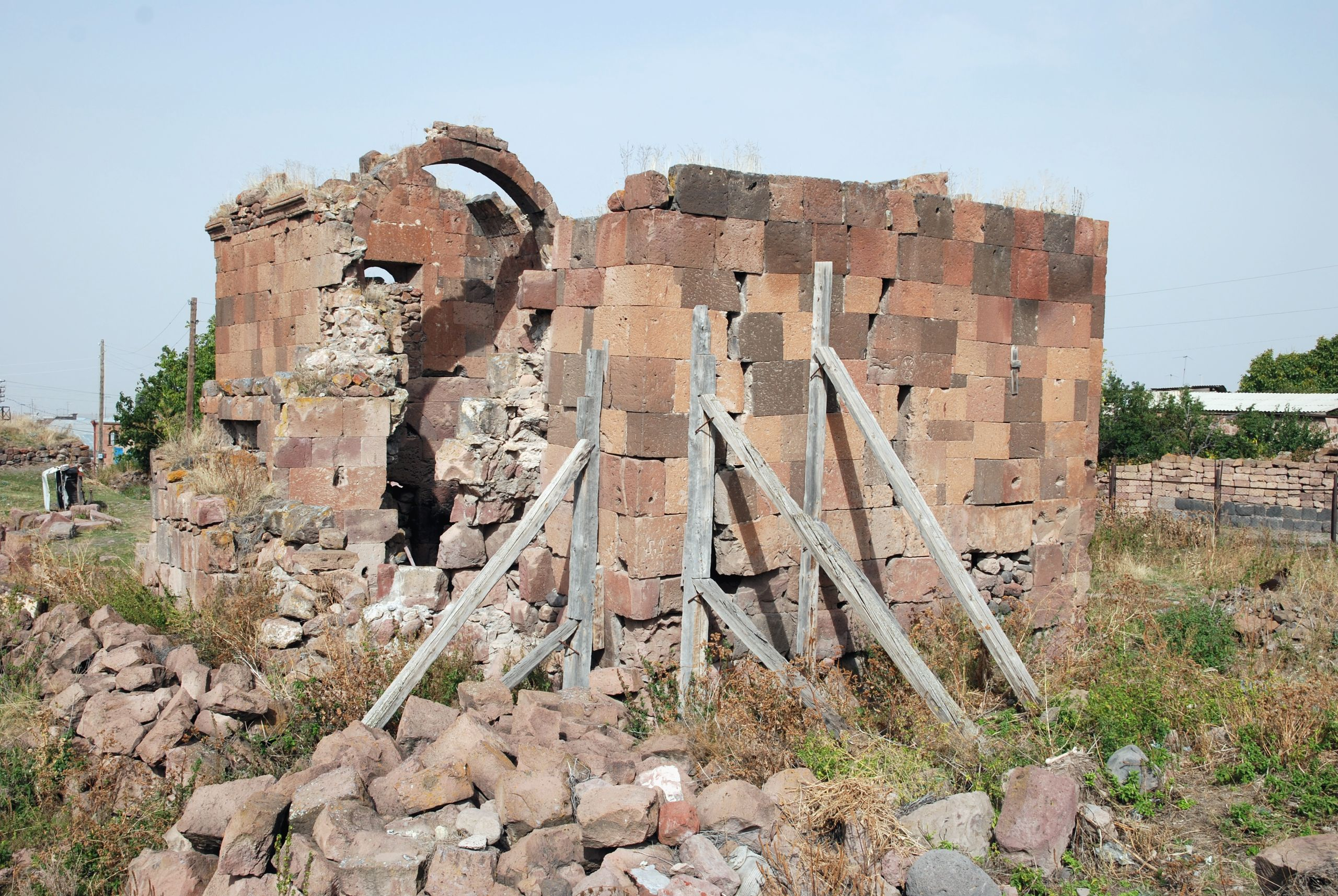
The ruins of the Holy Mother of God Church, 5th century

Historically, Artik has been part of the Shirak canton of the ancient Ayrarat province of Greater Armenia. During the reign of the Arsacid dynasty (52-428 AD) and later under Sasanid Persia (428–651), the area of Artik was ruled by the Kamsarakan Armenian noble family. As a settlement, Artik was most probably formed by the Kamsarakans during the 5th century, with the foundation of the monastic complex of the Holy Mother of God (also known as Surp Marine). They also built the Saint Stephen Church of Lmbat Monastery and Saint Gregory Church (also known as Saint George) during the 7th century.

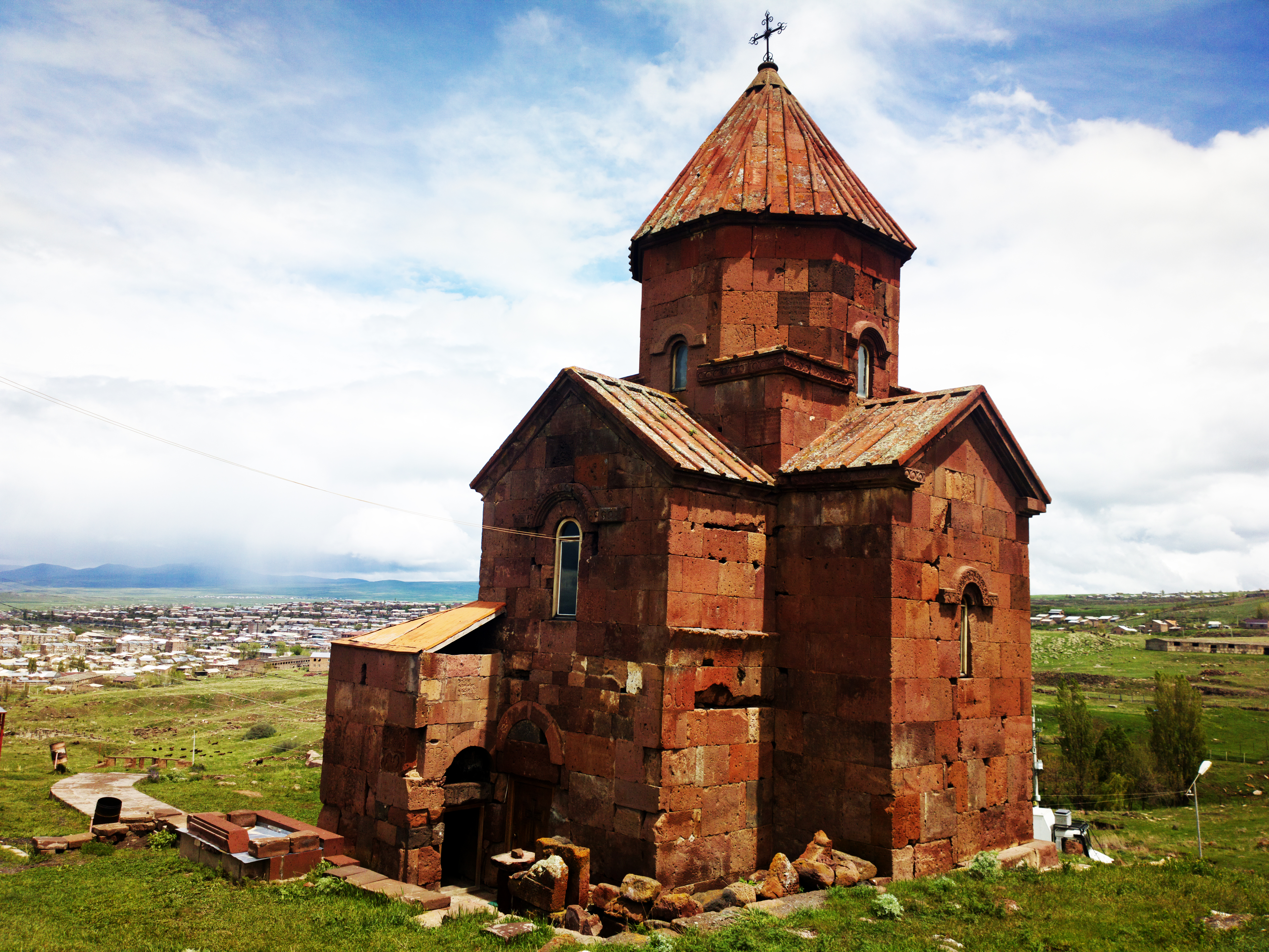
Lmbat Monastery, 7th century

With the Arab invasion of Armenia in 654, Artik was granted to the Bagratid dynasty, who founded the Bagratid Kingdom of Armenia later in 885. After the fall of Armenia to the Byzantine Empire in 1045 and later to the Seljuk invaders in 1064, the entire region of Shirak entered an era of downfall in all social, educational and cultural aspects.

With the establishment of the Zakarid Principality of Armenia in 1201 under the Georgian protectorate, the region of Shirak, entered into a new period of growth and stability. After the Mongols captured Ani in 1236, Zakarid Armenia turned into a Mongol protectorate as part of the Ilkhanate. After the fall of the Ilkhanate in the mid-14th century, the Zakarid princes controlled over Shirak until 1360 when they fell to the invading Turkic tribes.

By the last quarter of the 14th century, the Aq Qoyunlu Sunni Oghuz Turkic tribe took over Armenia, including Shirak. In 1400, Timur invaded Armenia and Georgia, and captured more than 60,000 of the survived local people as slaves. Many districts including Shirak were depopulated. In 1410, Armenia fell under the control of the Kara Koyunlu Shia Oghuz Turkic tribe. According to the Armenian historian Thomas of Metsoph, although the Kara Koyunlu levied heavy taxes against the Armenians, the early years of their rule were relatively peaceful and some reconstruction of towns took place.

In 1501, most of the Eastern Armenian territories including Yerevan and Shirak were conquered by the emerging Safavid dynasty of Iran. Under the Iranian rule, Artik has gradually declined as an urban centre, within the Erivan Governorate.

In June 1804, the Russian Empire took control of the region of Shirak at the beginning of the Russo-Persian War of 1804–1813. Artik became officially part of the Russian Empire at the Treaty of Gulistan signed on 1 January 1813. Many Armenian families from Kars and Karin were resettled in Artik in 1829–30. In 1840, Artik became part of the newly-formed Alexandropol Uyezd, which -in its turn- became part of the Erivan Governorate later in 1849.

After World War I, Artik was included within the borders of the newly founded Republic of Armenia, who enjoyed a short-lived independence from May 1918 until December 1920, when it fell to the invading Soviet Red Army.

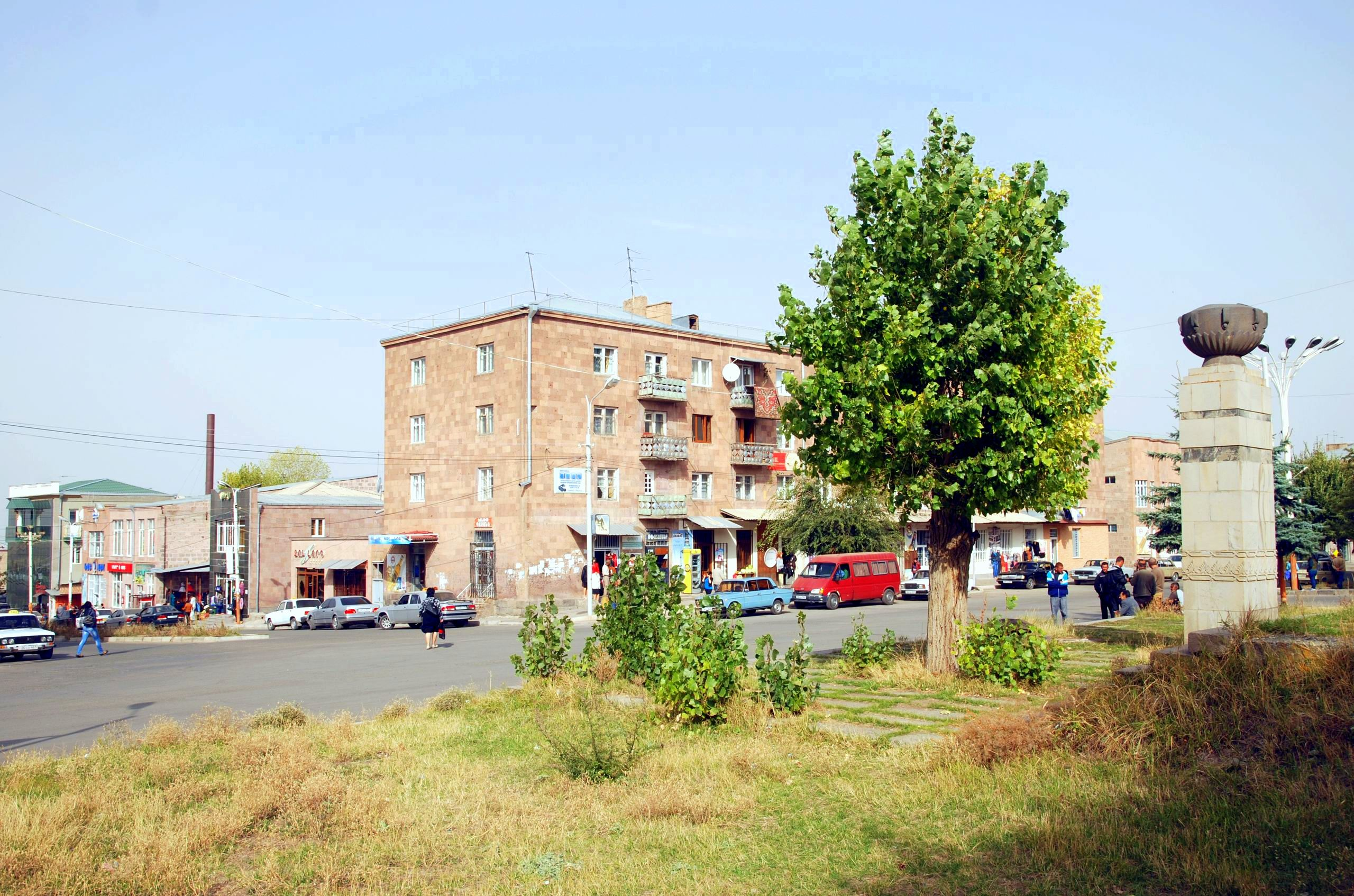
A central street in Artik

The Soviets opened the first tufa production combine in Artik known as "Artik-Tuf" in 1928. In 1930, the Artik raion of Soviet Armenia was formed with the village of Artik became its regional centre. In 1939, Artik became an urban-type settlement. Soon after, in 1945, it was given the status of a town. The first major urban plan of Artik was adopted in 1948 (later revised by architect A. Mirijanyan in 1965). With the gradual development of the town as an industrial hub, Artik has become a city of republican subordination within the Armenian Soviet Socialist Republic in 1963.

Between 1959 and 1965, the town witnessed a swift economic growth with the foundation of the Artik Factory for Vacuum Stoves, the Tufa-Blocks Factory and the Artik branch of "Arshaluys" textile factory. Many other industrial firms were also opened during the 1970s.

Following the dissolution of the Soviet Union in 1991, Artik became a town within the newly-formed Shirak Province as per the administrative reforms of 1995 of independent Armenia.

After the independence, Artik has gradually lost its importance as an industrial hub, as many of the industrial firms of the Soviet days were either forced to shut down or to operate with a minimal output.

== Geography ==
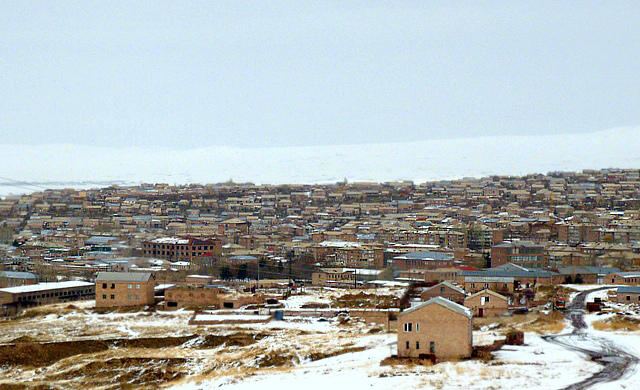
Winter in Artik, March 2009

Artik is situated at the northwestern foot of Mount Aragats within the Shirak Plain, at a height of 1,859 metres above sea level, at a 27 km road distance southeast of the provincial centre Gyumri. The capital Yerevan is located at a 67 km road distance southeast of Artik.

Two rivers; Artikjur and Gomshadzor enter the town of Artik from the southeast, passing through the centre towards the northwest of the town, where they join to form a tributary that flows into Mantash River.

Artik is mainly surrounded with dry steppes, having a humid continental climate, characterized with mildly cool summers and extremely cold and snowy winters.

== Demographics ==
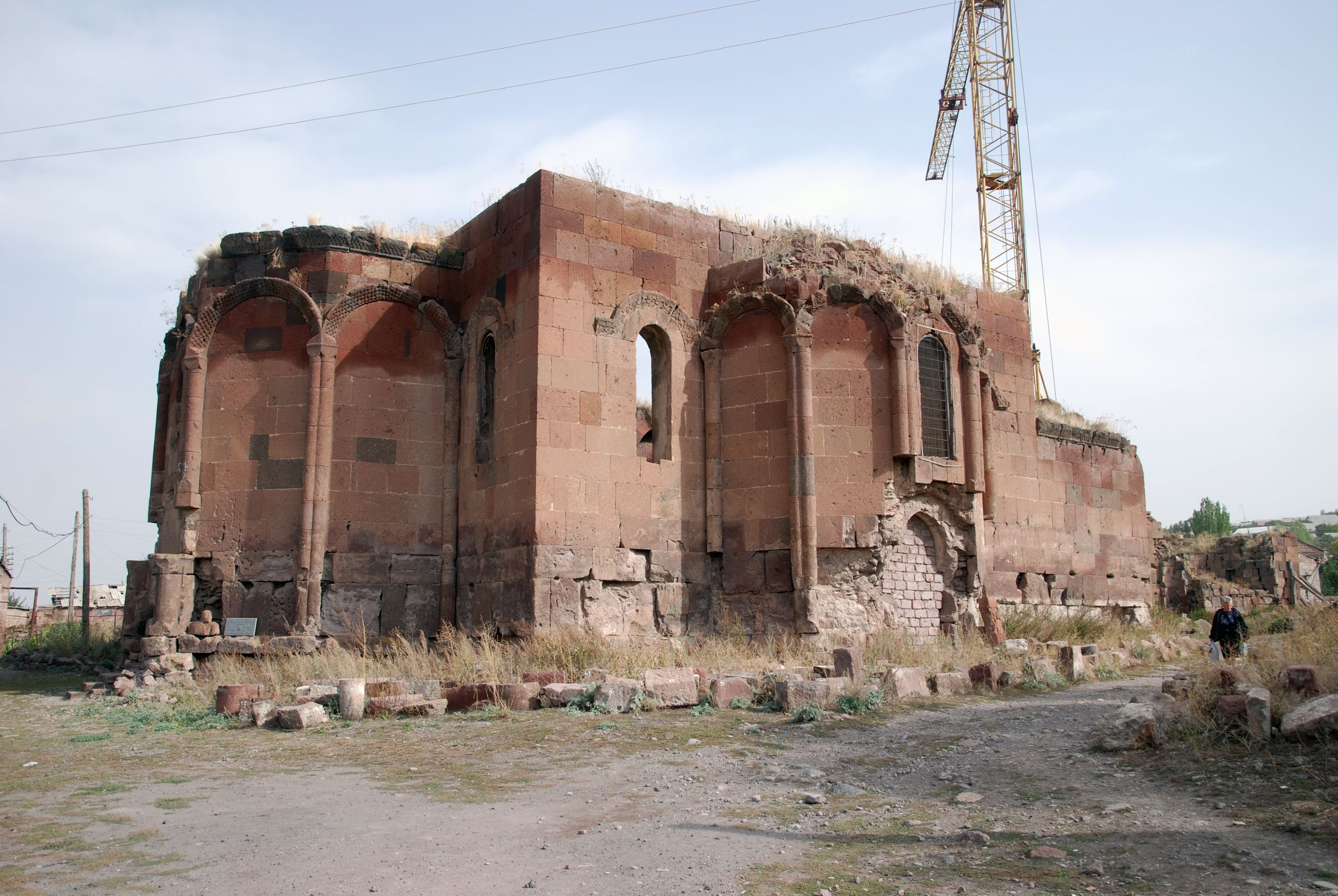
Saint Gregory Cathedral of the 7th century being reconstructed to become the seat of the Diocese of Artik

Historical population
Year	Pop.	±% p.a.
1831	647	—
1873	2,359	+3.13%
1897	2,950	+0.94%
1908	3,295	+1.01%
1975	14,726	+2.26%
1989	25,100	+3.88%
2001	17,561	−2.93%
2011	19,534	+1.07%
2022	17,647	−0.92%

The majority of the population in Artik are ethnic Armenians who belong to the Armenian Apostolic Church. The church is under the jurisdiction of the Diocese of Artik headed by Archimandrite Narek Avagyan, based in the Varagatun Saint Gregory Cathedral of Artik. The diocese was officially founded on 2 December 2012, when it was separated from the Diocese of Shirak, upon a kontakion issued by Catholicos Karekin II.

Artik is served by 2 major hospitals:

- Artik Medical Center.
- Center of Maternal and Child Health Protection of Artik.

== Culture ==
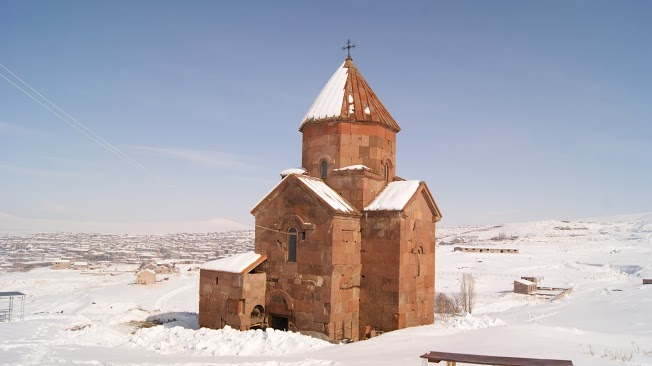
Lmbat Monastery in winter

Artik is one of the ancient settlements of Armenia. The town is home to many old cemetery yards dating back to the late Bronze Age.

The partly-ruined churches of the Holy Mother of God (also known as Saint Mariné) of the 5th century, and Saint Gregory Church (also known as Saint George) of the 7th century, are located at the centre of Artik. Surp Gevork is the larger of the two, had previously served as a warehouse during the Soviet days. It was partly restored in the early 1990s. On January 6, 2006, a fund-raising campaign was announced in Artik to reconstruct the Surp Gevork Church.

The Saint Stephen Church of Lmbat Monastery is a well-preserved church of the 7th century, located at the southwestern vicinity of the town. It was reconstructed in 1955–56.

There is also another 18th-century church in a cave as well as one of (Saint Stepanos) built in the 7th century standing on a hillside. During 1960 excavations, a Bronze-Age cemetery was discovered under the stones.

Artik is home to a cultural palace named after composer Tigran Mansurian, 2 school of arts, a music school, as well as a public library. A memorial dedicated to the Great Patriotic War (World War II) is found at the Liberty Square at the centre of the town.

== Transportation ==
The M-1 Motorway that connects Yerevan with Gyumri passes through the western suburbs of Artik. The town is connected with the motorway via the H-1 Road. Taxi services are available in tho town, while regular mini bus trips connect Artik with Yerevan, Gyumri, and many other major cities in Armenia.

Artik has a railway station that played a vital role for the industrial town during the Soviet days but which has not had a regular passenger service since 2013.

== Economics ==
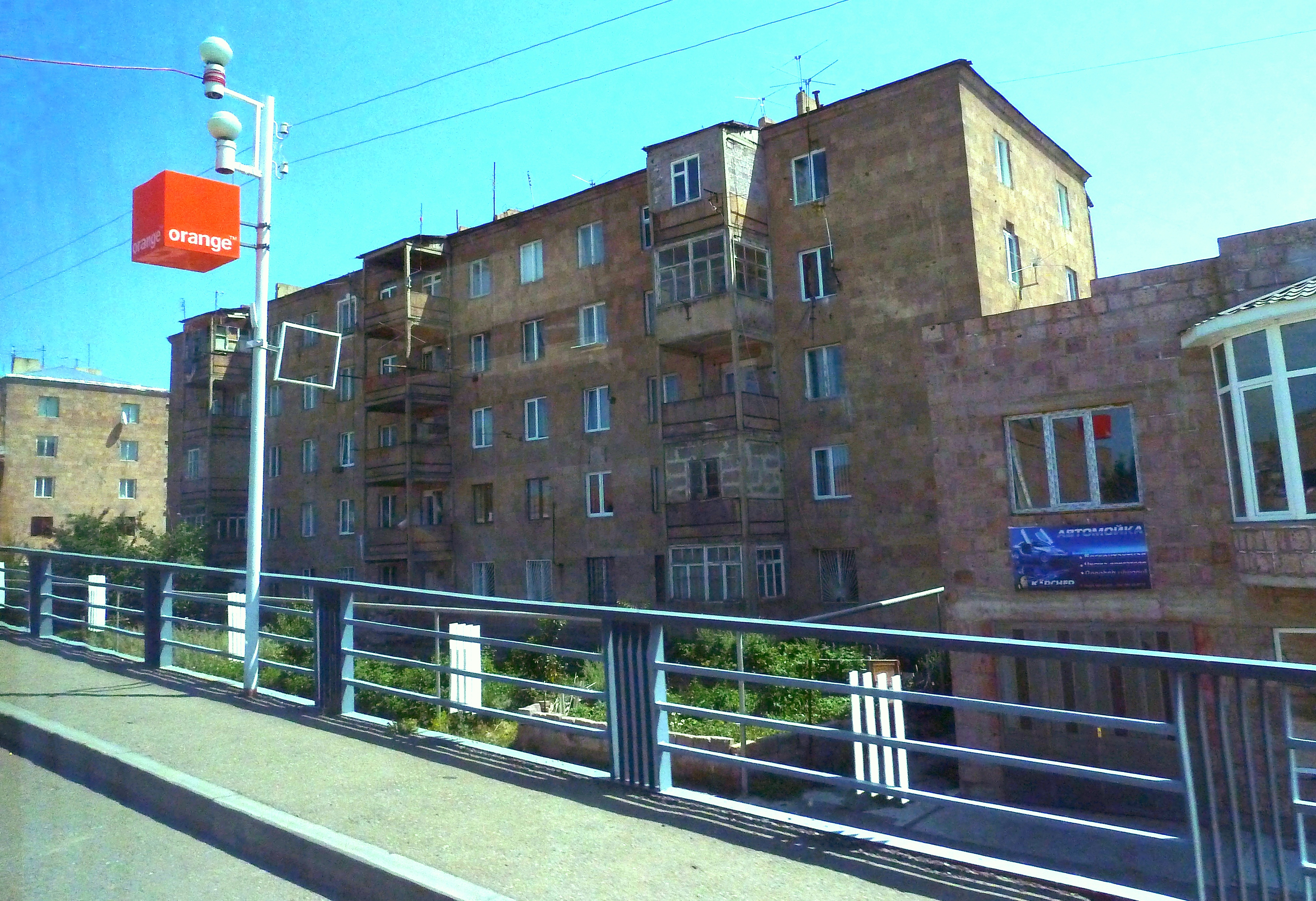
Residential buildings in Artik

Despite the economical difficulties of independent Armenia, the town of Artik is still a major centre for the production of its famous tufa stones. Many stone-processing plants that produce travertine, tufa and basalt are operating in the town, including the "Artik-Tuf" state-owned firm of 1928, the "Tufa-Blocks Factory" of the 1960s (privatized in 1997), "Karastgh" stone-processing plant of 2005, and "Turinj" tufa processing plant of 2005.

Artik is also home to the Artik Cheese Factory, the Eliz Group for dairy products, the Artik Factory for Vacuum Stoves, and the "Artik Steklomash" metal casting factory.

== Education ==
As of 2017, Artik is home to 8 public education schools, 4 pre-school kindergartens, 1 school for special needs and 2 private intermediate vocational colleges. Additionally, the town has a state intermediate college of industry and technology, with an enrollment of around 250 students in 2016.

== Sports ==
Football is the most popular sport in Artik. FC Tufagorts Artik represented the town in the Armenian Premier League between 1992 and 1995, when it was dissolved due to financial difficulties. They used the Artik City Stadium for their home games.

The town also had its futsal playing at the domestic competitions until 2017, when it was ceased from professional sport.

Artik has 2 sport schools run by the municipality.
