= Vartanants Square =

Coordinates: 40°47′07″N 43°50′30″E

- Վարդանանց Հրապարակ (Armenian)
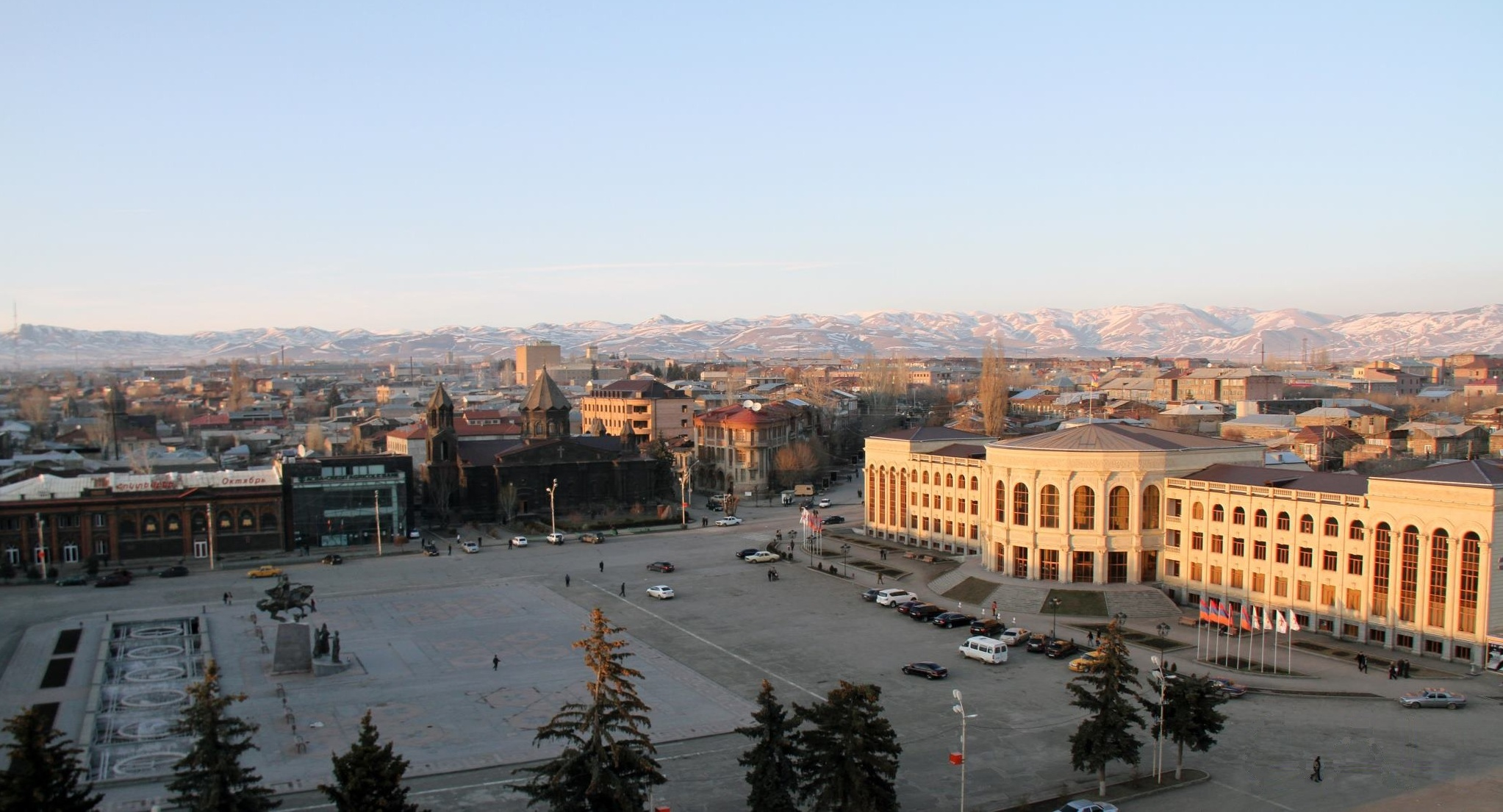
- The equestrian statue of Vartan Mamikonian and Gyumri City Hall at the Vartanants Square
- Interactive map of Vartanants Square
- Location: Gyumri, Armenia

History
- Built: 1930s (completed)

Site notes
- Area: 39,200 m^{2} (422,000 sq ft)
- Architectural styles: mix of Armenian, Russian and neoclassical
- Governing body: Gyumri City Council

Vartanants Square (Armenian: Վարդանանց Հրապարակ Vartanants Hraparak) or Vardanants Square, is the large central town square in Gyumri, Armenia. It is bordered by Abovyan street from the west, Gai street from the north, Shahumyan street from the east and Vahan Cheraz street from the south. It has a rectangular shape (280 by 140 meters).

The square was known as May Uprising Square (Armenian: Մայիսյան Ապստամբության հրապարակ), named after the failed Bolshevik uprising against the Dashnak government of the First Republic of Armenia in May 1920. The square was opened during the 1930s under Soviet rule, based on the original plan of Alexander Tamanian and the revised plan of D. Chislian.

== Description ==
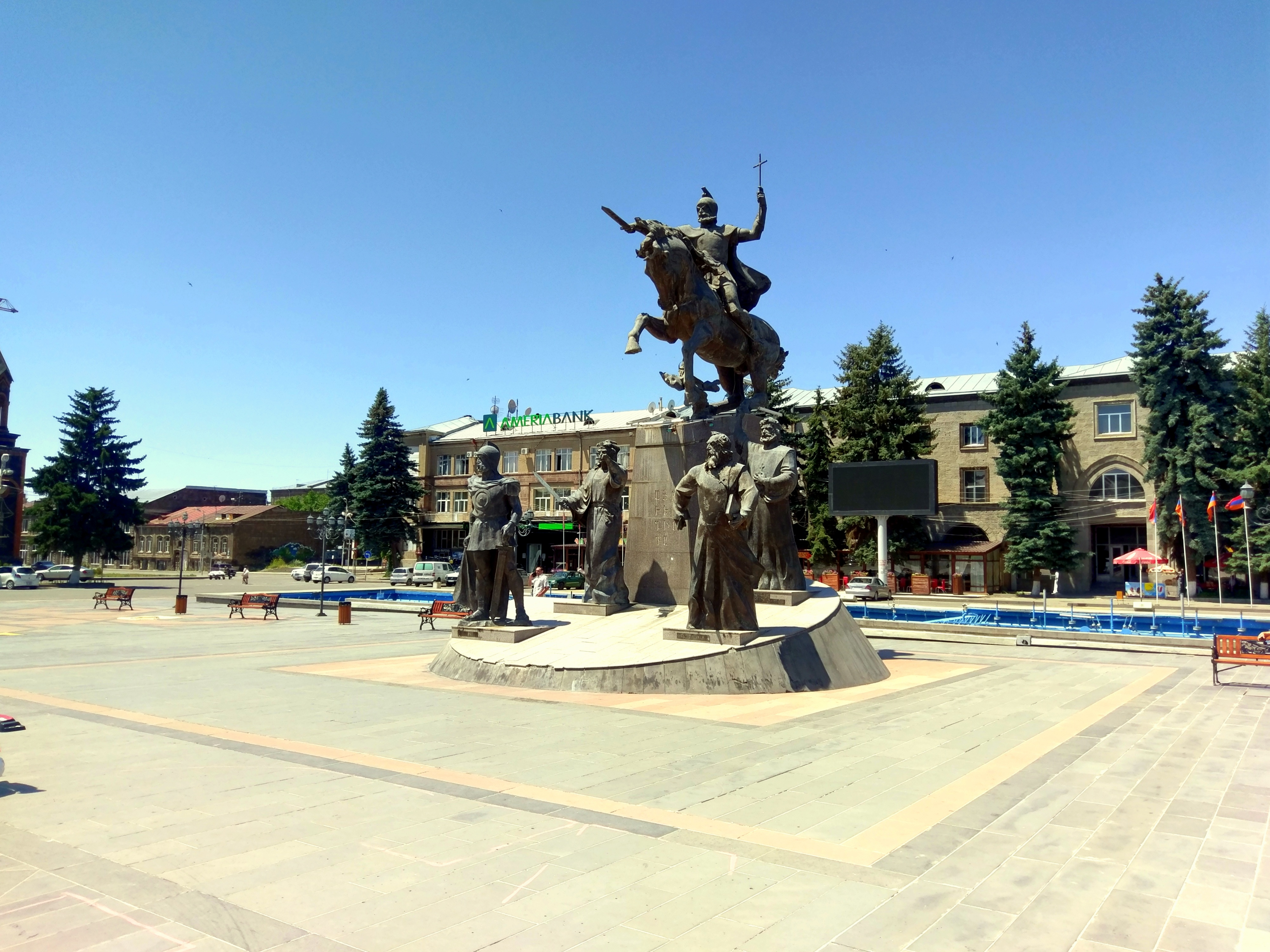
Memorial to the Battle of Avarayr

The square is decorated with several fountains with a memorial to the Battle of Avarayr at the central part. The memorial was erected in 2008 and includes a group of historic Armenian figures who led the Armenian army's campaign against Sassanid Persia. The equestrian statue of Vartan Mamikonian is erected at the centre of the memorial. The other four statues depict the Catholicos Hovsep I of Armenia, Ghevond Yerets, V. Mamikonian's mother and the prince Arshavir II Kamsarakan.

On 25 June 2016, Pope Francis delivered a Holy Mass at the Vartanants Square. Catholicos of All Armenians Garegin II also took part in the ceremony.

=== Buildings around the square ===
The square is surrounded with many significant buildings:

- The Gyumri City Hall built in 1933, occupies the eastern side.
- The 19th-century Church of the Holy Saviour to the south of the square.
- The 19th-century Cathedral of the Holy Mother of God north and the "October" cinema hall of 1926, on the northern side.
- A hotel built in 1927 on the western edge of the square.

== Gallery ==
Vartanants Square

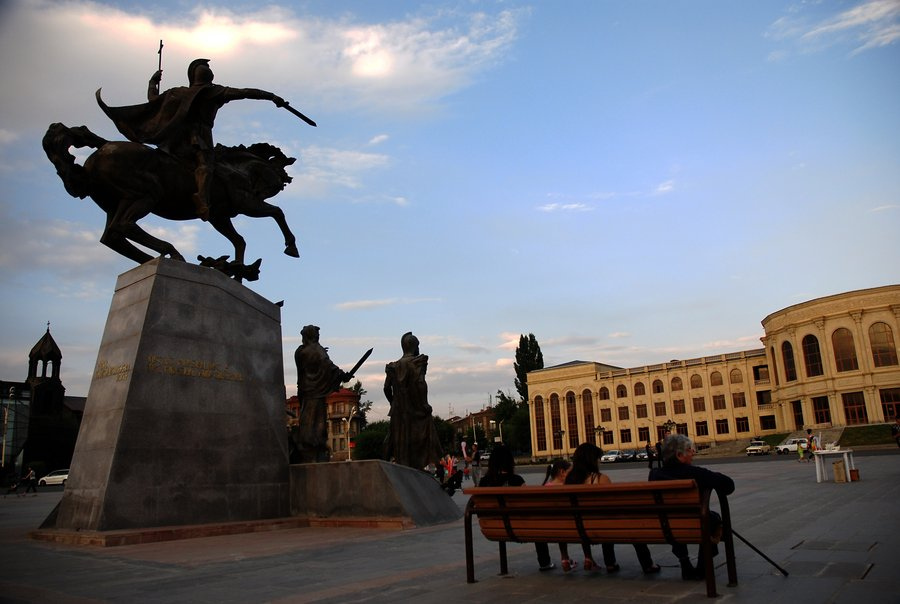
The city hall

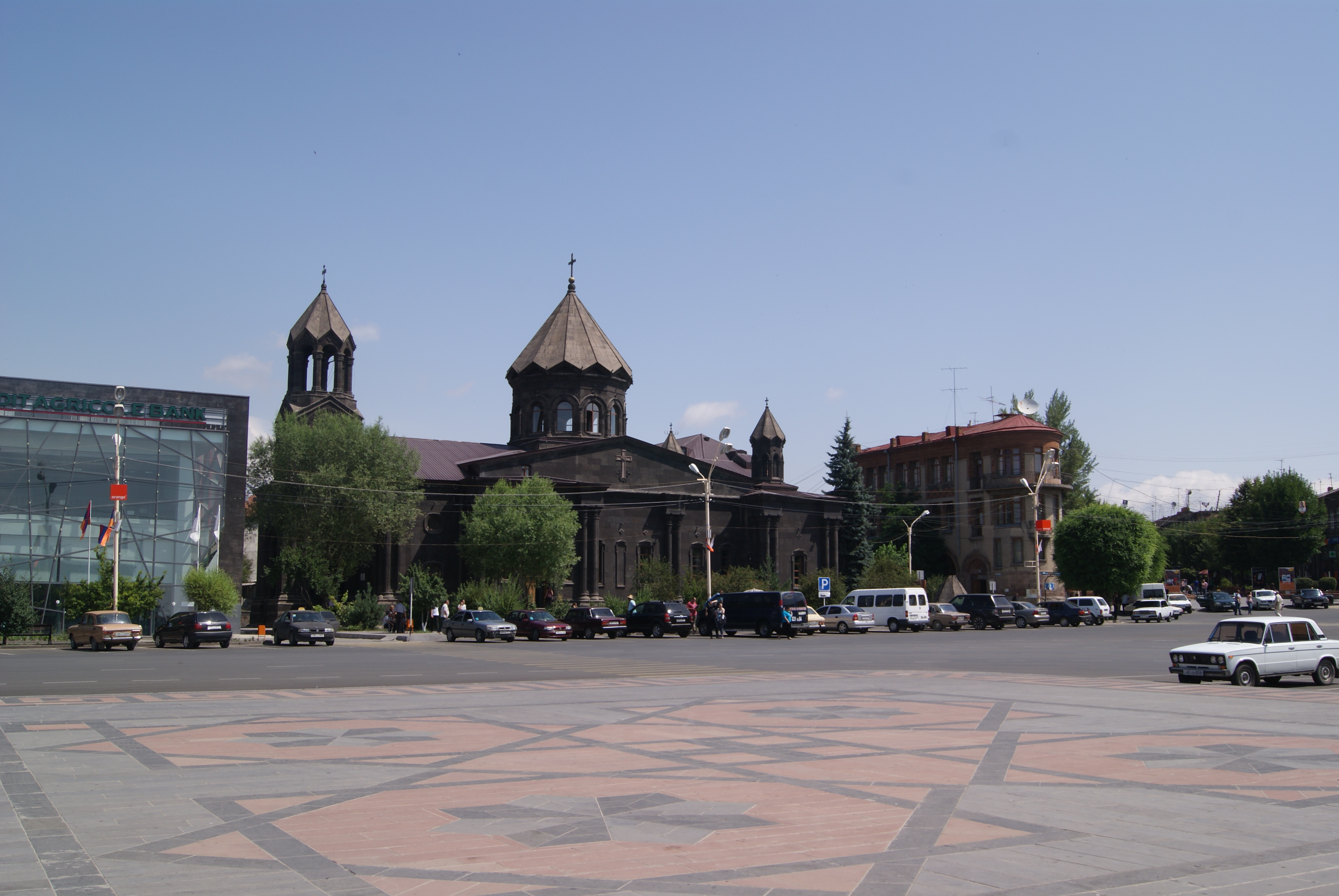
Cathedral of the Holy Mother of God

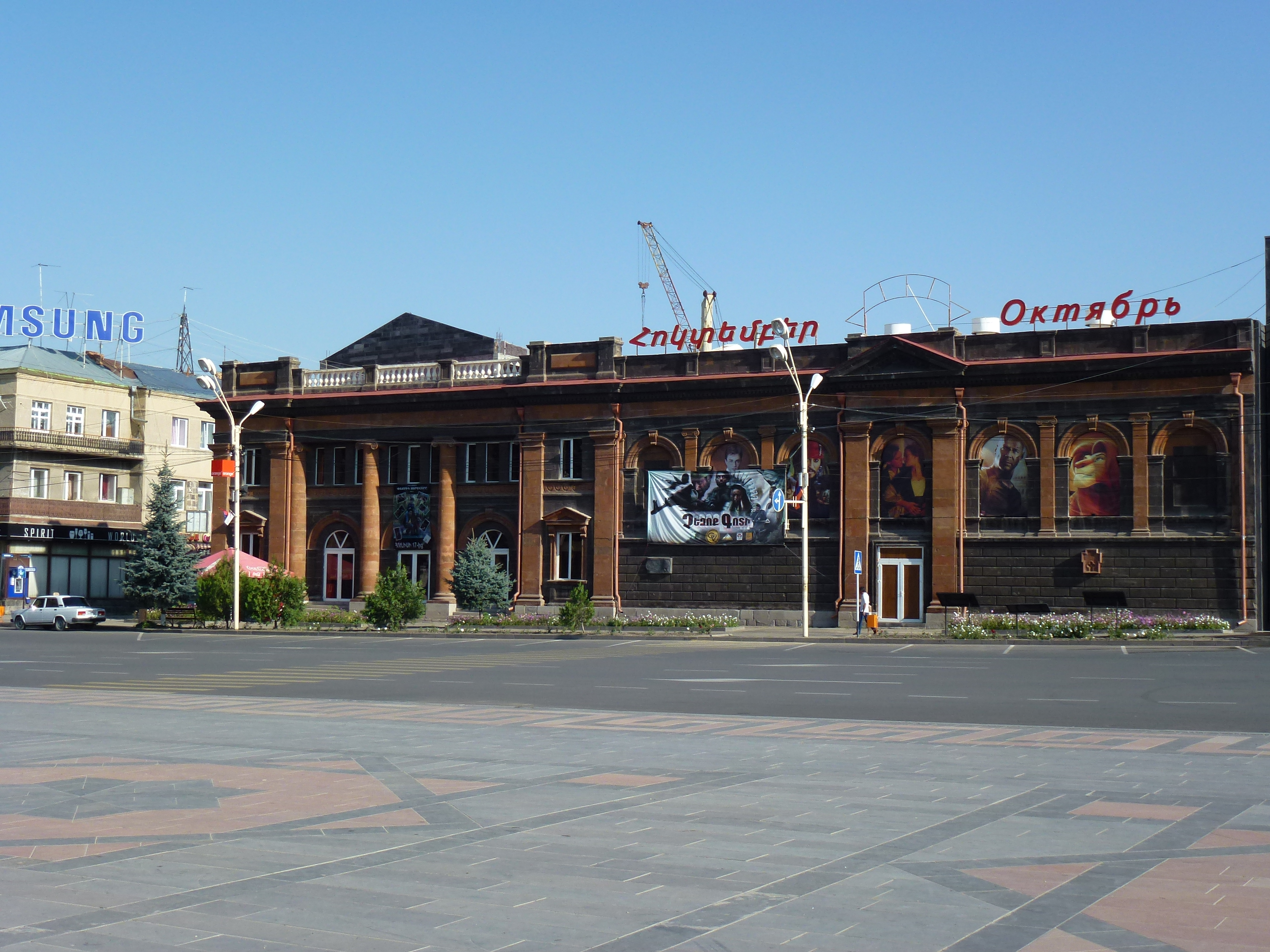
"October" cinema hall

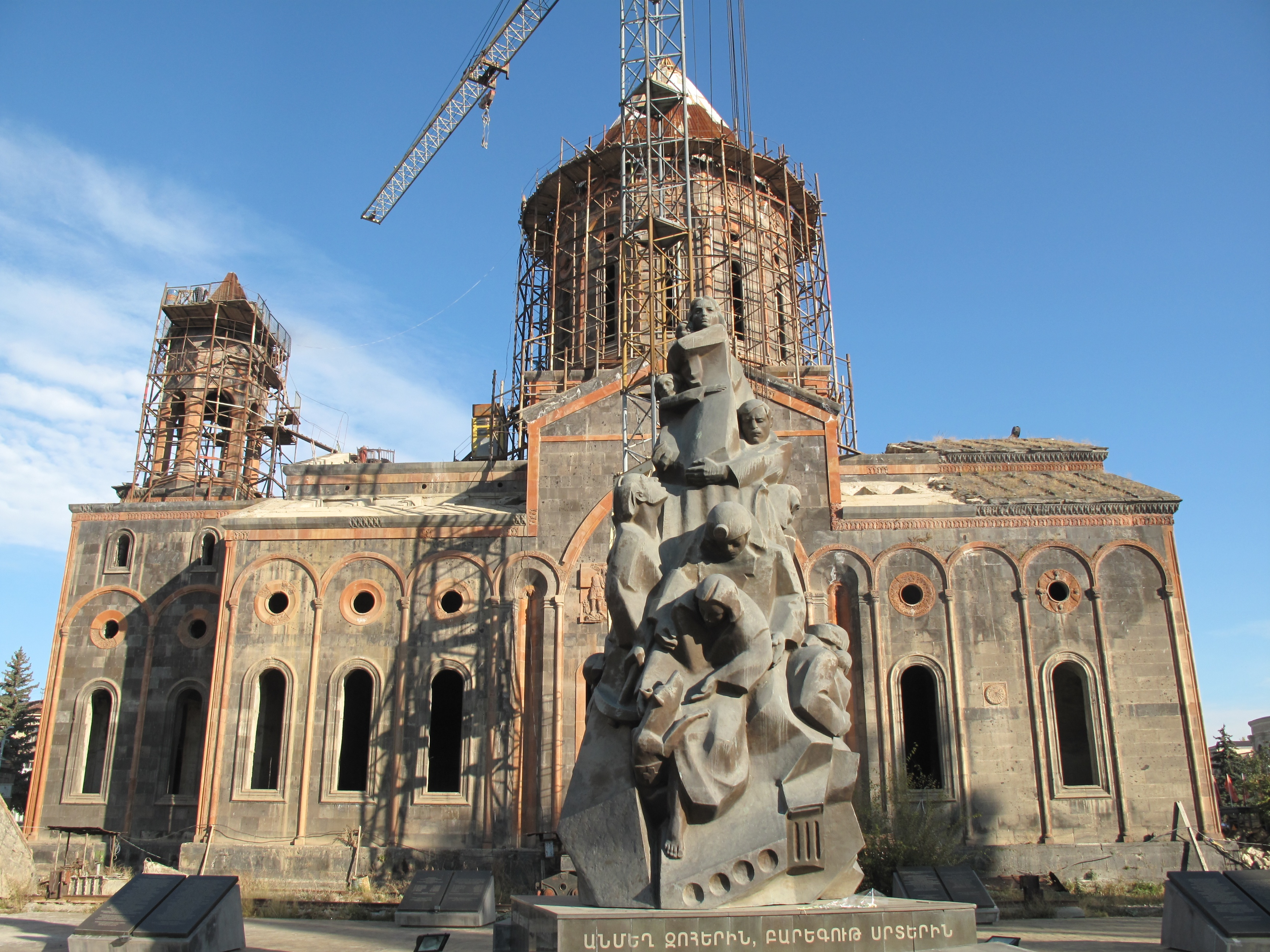
Church of the Holy Saviour

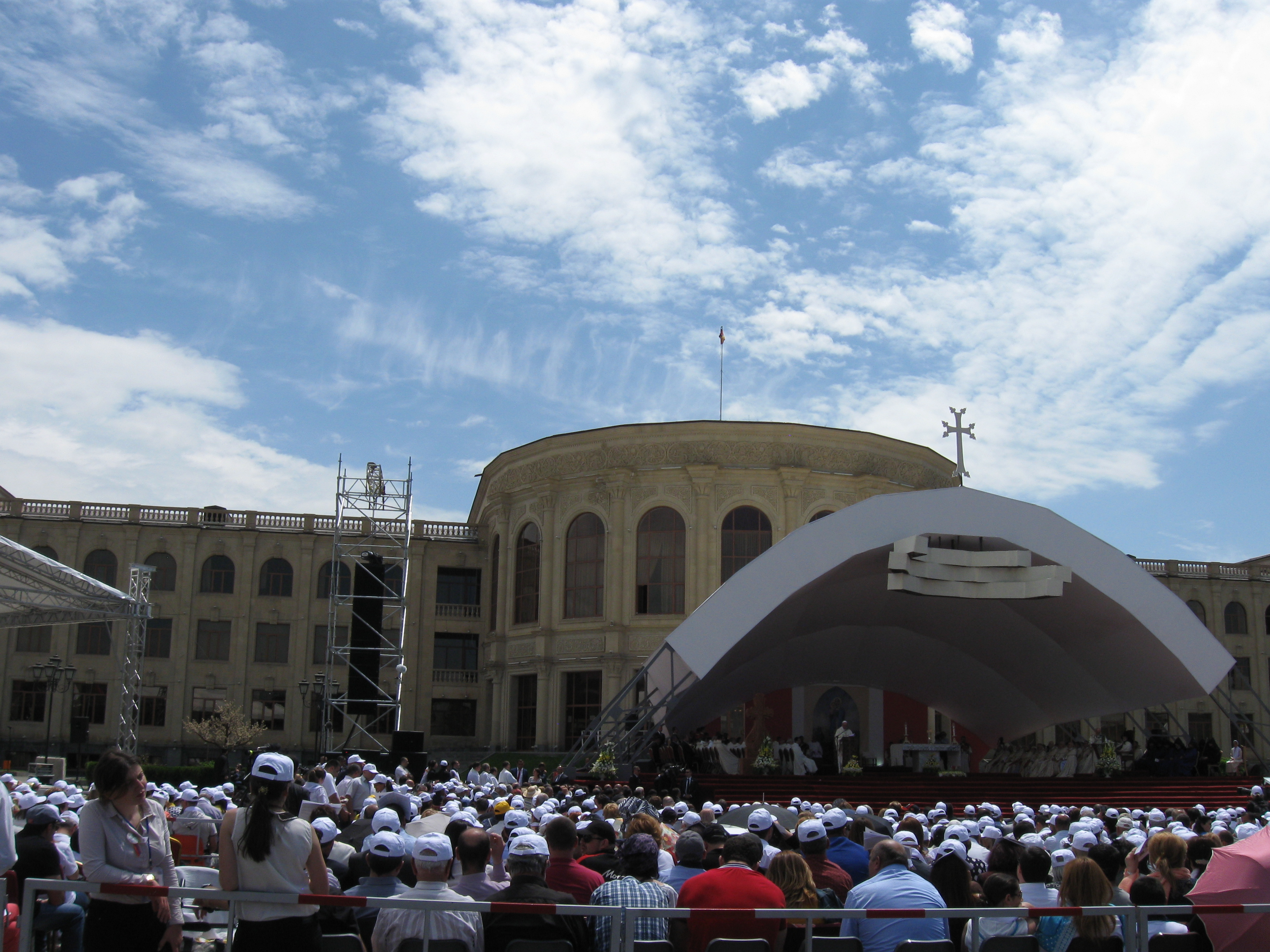
Holy mass by Pope Francis at the square
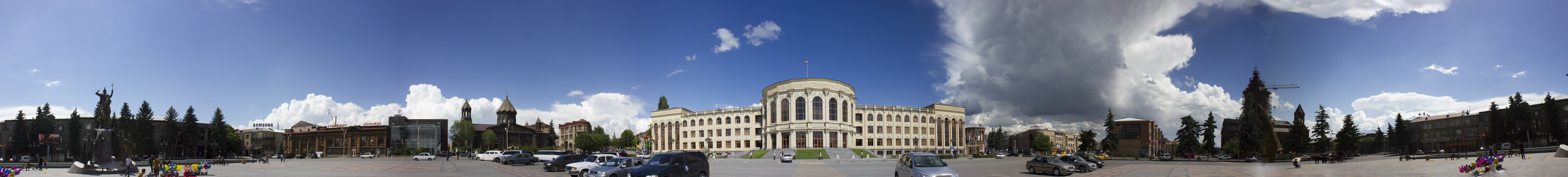
Panoramic view of Vartanants Square
