= Diocese of Artik =

Diocese of Artik Արթիկի թեմ

Location
- Country: Armenia

Statistics
- Population: Total: (as of 2016 est.); ~60,000

Information
- Denomination: Armenian Apostolic Church
- Rite: Armenian Rite
- Established: 2012
- Cathedral: Varagatun Saint Gregory Cathedral, Artik

Current leadership
- Patriarch: Karekin II
- Primate: Archimendrite Narek Avagyan

Diocese of Artik (Armenian: Արթիկի թեմ Artiki t'em), is a diocese of the Armenian Apostolic Church covering the southern part of Shirak Province of Armenia, including the towns of Artik, Maralik, and their surrounding villages.

The diocese is based in the historical Armenian town of Artik, within the historic Shirak canton of Ayrarat province of ancient Greater Armenia.

The Diocese of Artik was officially founded on 2 December 2012, when it was separated from the Diocese of Shirak, upon a kontakion issued by Catholicos Karekin II. The seat of the diocese is the 7th-century Saint Gregory the Illuminator Cathedral, currently being entirely reconstructed. The prelacy is based in the nearby Varagatun religious complex, consecrated in 2012.
