= Kamsarakan =

Armenian noble family

- Parent house: House of Karen
- Country: Ayrarat; Arsharunik
- Founder: Prince Kamsar (d. 325)
- Cadet branches: Pahlavuni

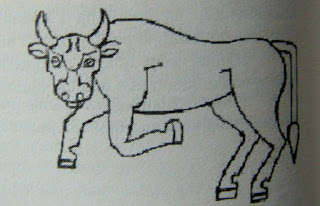

The House of Kamsarakan (Armenian: Կամսարական) was an Armenian noble family that was an offshoot of the House of Karen, also known as the Karen-Pahlav. The Karens were one of the Seven Great Houses of Iran and were of Parthian origin.

In the Byzantine-Sasanian era, the Kamsarakan were mostly known for following a pro-Byzantine policy. In the late 8th century, they met their downfall as a result of participating in an uprising against Arab rule.

After the 8th century, a branch of the Kamsarakan, the Pahlavuni, rose to prominence. According to Cyril Toumanoff the Pahlavunis in turn had two branches: the Mkhargrdzeli, associated with the Kingdom of Georgia; and the Hethumids, associated with the Armenian Kingdom of Cilicia.

== Background and history ==
=== The Kamsarakan family ===
A branch of the House of Karen (Karen-Pahlav), one of the Seven Great Houses of Iran, the name of Kamsarakan is derived from Prince Kamsar, who died in 325. The Kamsarakans had their base in the "two princely states", which were both located in the historic region of Ayrarat-Arsharunik. The city of Yervandashat, in present-day eastern Turkey, was their capital. The fortresses of Bagaran, Artagers, Shirak and Ani (which later became a city) were also associated with the Kamsarakan.

From their establishment the Kamsarakans enjoyed prestige in Armenia due to being the cousins of the royal Arsacids. Following the demise of the Arsacids in Armenia in 428 the Kamsarakan acquired a large amount of political power due to their position as important border lords; or, as Toumanoff puts it "to their quasi-margravial position on the northern frontier of the realm". The Kamsarakans had a high rank in the order of precedence of the Armenian princes; they supposedly ranked second "of the four broad classes". As such they had a feudal obligation to supply 600 horses to their suzerain, the King of Armenia.

According to Cyril Toumanoff / Encyclopædia Iranica, due to the geographical location of their principalities, the Kamsarakan were not involved "in any special way in Armino-Iranian relations". However, according to Parvaneh Pourshariati / Encyclopædia Iranica, the Kamsarakan "were directly involved in the history of the Byzantines and the Sasanians". When the Roman Empire annexed the western part of historic Armenia, Gazavon II Kamsarak and other family members moved to Sasanian Armenia, at the time ruled by an Armenian vassal. Prior to this Gazavon II had been the leader of the pro-Roman Armenian princes. Later another Kamsarakan family member, Arshavir II, is recorded as having participated in the anti-Sasanian revolt led by Vardan Mamikonian. Arshavir II also took part in the insurrection of 482–484, together with his son and successor Nerses.

The Kamsarakans were known for following a broadly pro-Byzantine policy, and they were actively involved in the political life of the empire as well. For example, three brothers from the Kamsarakan family served as generals for Justinian I (r. 527–565); Narses, Isaac the Armenian (Sahak), and another Isaac (Sahak), who was executed by the king of the Ostrogoths, Totila, in 546. A later Kamsarakan, Narses II Kamsarakan, served as presiding prince of Armenia for the Byzantine emperor in the late 7th century, and also held the high-ranking Byzantine office of curopalates. Another individual, presumably a Kamsarak, was the patrician Arsaber (Arshavir), noted for revolting against the Byzantine emperor in 808.

The Kamsarakans took part in the revolt against Arab rule in Armenia in 771–772. When the insurrection failed, the Kamsarakan were amongst the "victims of the disaster", and they had no choice but to sell their "double princedom" to the Bagratids.

=== The Pahlavuni family ===
In the Bagratid era, the Kamsarakan rose to prominence once again, now represented by its cadet branch the Pahlavunis, led by the princes Bdjni and Nig. Cyril Toumanoff notes:

it derived also the name of Arsharuni from one of its principalities, which distinguished it from the related houses of Abelian (princes of Abelunikʿ), Gabelian, Havenni and, possibly, Dziunakan; after the 8th century, it bore, in memory of its origin, the surname of Pahlavuni."

When the Bagratids were destroyed and Prince Gregory II abdicated in 1045–1046 to allow the Byzantine emperor to assume control over his lands, the Pahlavunis moved to Cilicia, where they were known as the Hethumids. They dominated this "last phase of Armenia’s political history", first as princes of Lambrun, and after 1226, as kings of Armenia. When the Hethumids died out in the 14th century the Armenian crown passed, through inheritance, to the Lusignan dynasty of Cyprus, and afterwards to the House of Savoy. The Mkhargrdzeli, another branch of the Pahlavunis, were a dominant force in the Kingdom of Georgia in the 12th – 14th centuries, and "has survived to this day".

=== Patrons of architecture ===
The Kamsarakans and their Pahlavuni branch, and in turn the Mkhargrdzelis, were known for being patrons of Armenian architecture. Notable examples of structures built by the family include castles and palaces, as well as "splendid churches", such as the Church of St. Gregory (commissioned by Abughamr I Pahlavuni).

== Sources ==
- Pourshariati, Parvaneh (2017). "Kārin". In Yarshater, Ehsan (ed.). Encyclopædia Iranica (Online ed.). Encyclopædia Iranica Foundation.
- Toumanoff, C. (2010). "Kamsarakan". In Yarshater, Ehsan (ed.). Encyclopædia Iranica. Vol. XV/5: Ḵamsa of Jamāli–Karim Devona. London and New York: Routledge & Kegan Paul. pp. 453–455. ISBN 978-1-934283-28-8.
