= Bjni Fortress =

Armenian fortress

Bjni Fortress Բջնի բերդ
- Kotayk Province, Armenia
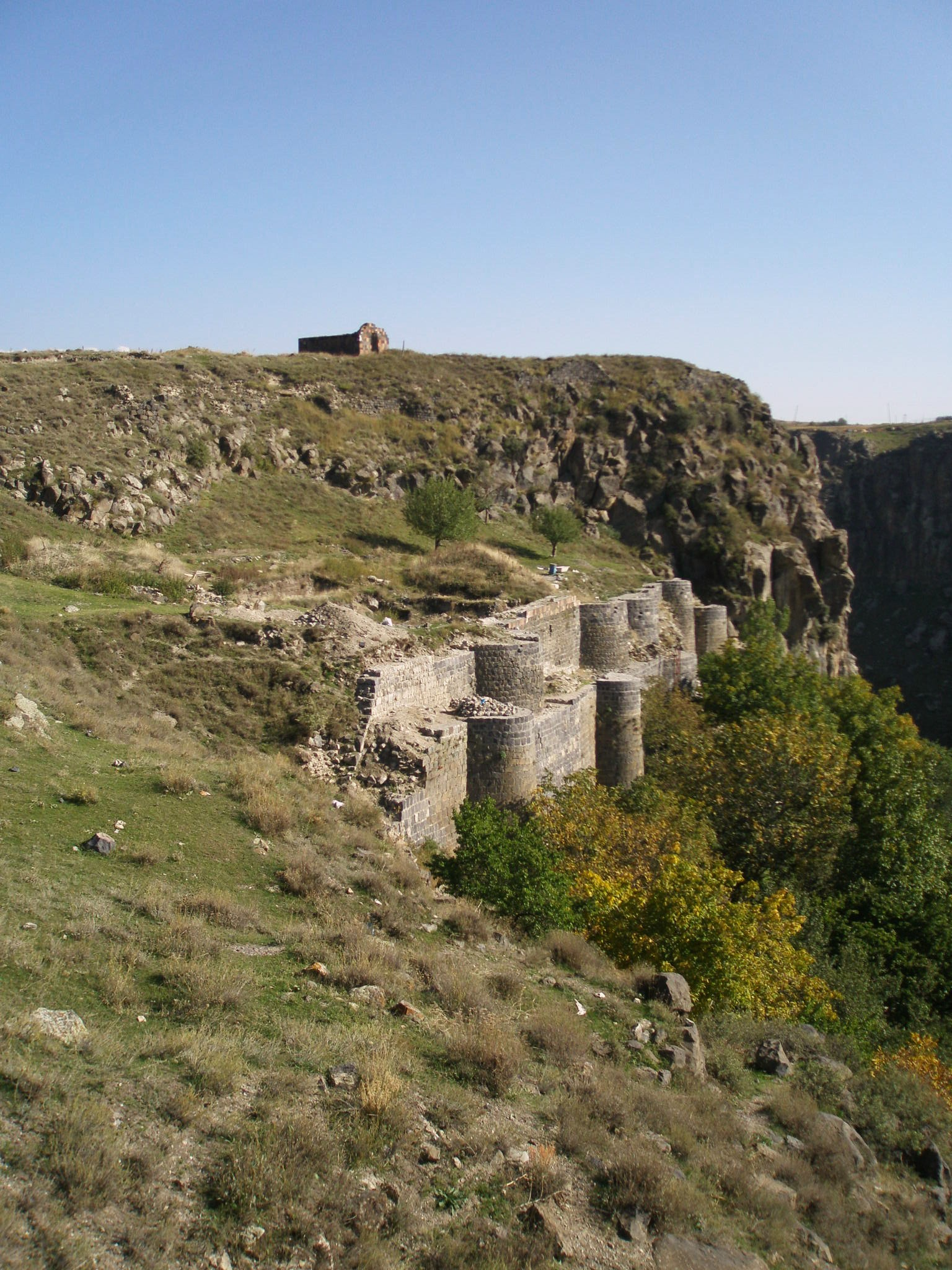
- Remains of the fortification walls at Bjni, October 2009.

Site information
- Type: Fortress
- Controlled by: Pahlavuni family from the 11th to 13th century; Zakharyan family from the 13th to late 14th century
- Open to the public: Yes; ask a local near the hill to show the easiest route up (there are two routes).
- Condition: Some of the exterior fortress walls survive in relatively poor condition.

Location
- Shown within Armenia
- Coordinates: 40.4607°N 44.6544°E

Site history
- Built: From the 9th to 10th century
- Built by: Pahlavuni family of the Bagratuni dynasty
- In use: As a fortress by the Pahlavuni family and possibly the Zakharyan family as well
- Materials: Stone
- Demolished: Quite possibly during the destruction of the village of Bjni by the Turko-Mongol conqueror Timur Lenk in 1387–1388

Bjni Fortress (Armenian: Բջնի բերդ) is a medieval Armenian fortress located in the village of Bjni in the Kotayk Province of Armenia. It sits upon the top and along the sides of a mesa that divides the village nearly in half. The larger portion of which is located west of the mesa and curves south, while a smaller portion is east. The walls of the fortress may only be seen from the western side of the village, and are easiest reached via a narrow dirt road that forks (take the left fork) and goes up the side of the hill past some residences. Bjni Fortress is 1,504 metres (4,934 ft) above sea level.

== History ==
The fortress of Bjni was built in the 9th to 10th century by the royal Pahlavuni family of the Bagratuni dynasty. The commander of Bjni, lord Vasak Holum Pahlavuni (the Pahlavid) reconstructed the fortress. The 12th century Armenian historian Matteos Urhayetsi wrote in part 1 of the "Chronicle" covering the late 10th to early 11th centuries, of the invasions of mercenary Turkish soldiers of the Daylamis at Bjni in 1021 who went to raid and plunder villages and towns.

In this period the ruler of Delumk (Daylamis) collected troops and unexpectedly came and reached the Armenian district of Nig, near the stronghold of Bjni. Vasak, the commander-in-chief of the Armenians, with his beloved son Gregory and with other illustrious noblemen, was making merry in his castle. Vasak looked at the stony road, and lo, a man was coming in haste up the road on foot. Upon seeing him, Vasak said, "This man is a bearer of bad news." The man arrived at the gates of the fortress of Bjni and, raising an outcry, said, "The whole district of Nig has been enslaved!"

Vasak and his men became furious and pursued the enemy forces into battle near the Kasakh River killing 300 of them and causing the rest to flee. After becoming exhausted from the fighting, Vasak left the battle to find a place to rest at a mountain called Serkevelo. One of the villagers who had fled the scene, saw the commander asleep and struck him with a heavy blow. He then threw Vasak from one of the high rocks, killing him.

During the years 1387–88 the Turko-Mongol conqueror Timur Lenk destroyed the village of Bjni and most likely the castle as well. In manuscripts written by Thomas of Metsoph from the late 14th to mid-15th century, he left an account of Timur's invasions stating that,

Next [Timur] came to the Araratean country and Karbi and the Kotayk' country. He besieged the fortress of Bjni, took it and killed the bishop of the land, lord Vanakan, who was a wise and learned man, merciful and kind to all the poor. Furthermore, they tormented the entire multitude of believers with starvation, the sword, enslavement, and with unbearable tortures and bestial behavior they made the most populous district of Armenia uninhabited. Many people were martyred and were worthy of the crown; [they] are known only to the One who receives them, Christ our God. May He crown them on the day that the flock of the righteous are rewarded. Amen.

== Site ==
Portions of the exterior fortification walls at Bjni have survived and follow the sides of the mesa. At the plateau, there are sections of battlements that remain in relatively poor condition. Traces of where the foundations of structures had once stood are indicated by depressions in the ground at various areas. There is also the stone foundation of a church of the 5th century, a medieval structure that is still partially standing (currently being rebuilt as of 2009), two cisterns one with the remains of intact vaulting, and a covered passage that led to the river in the event of a siege.

== Gallery ==
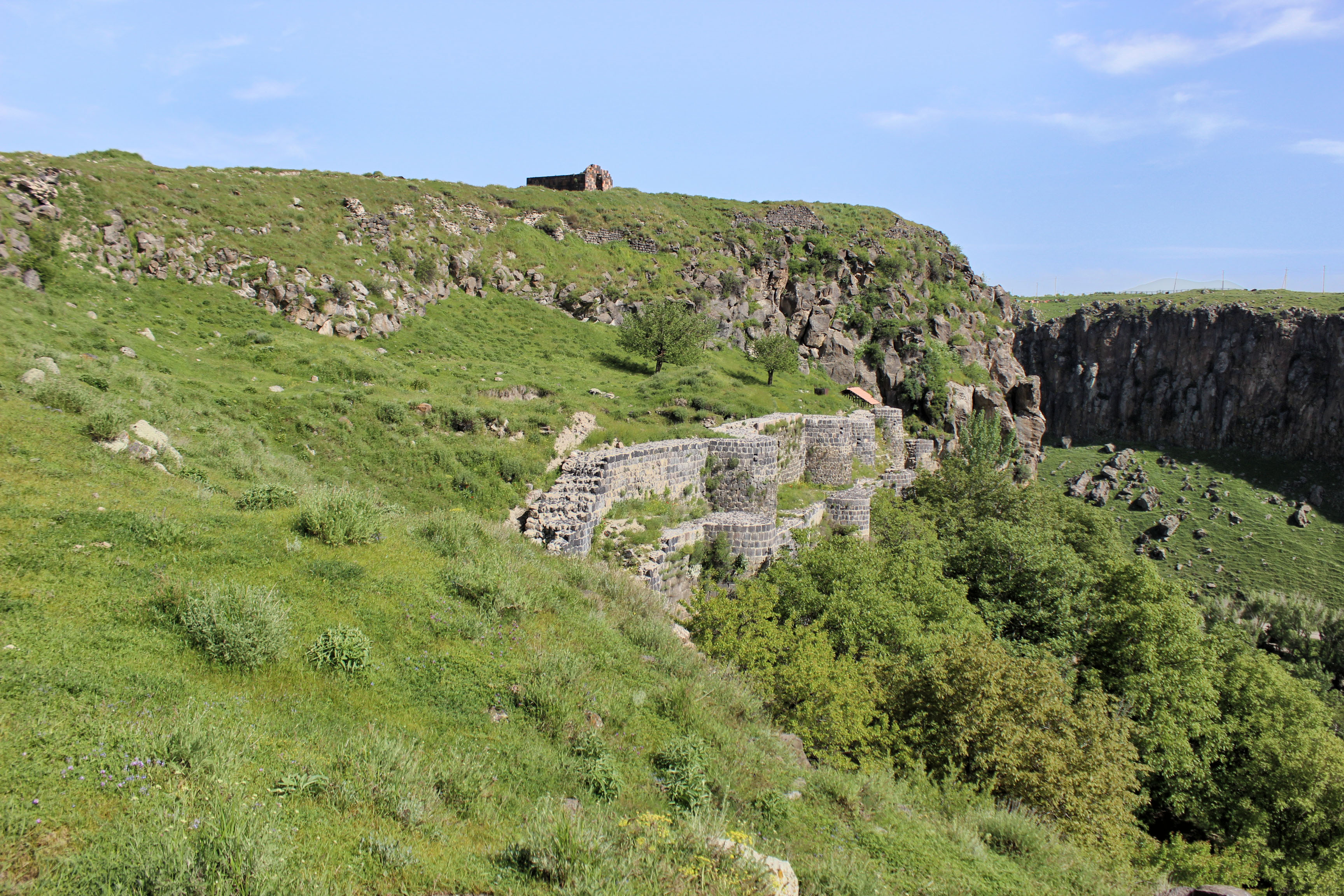
General view

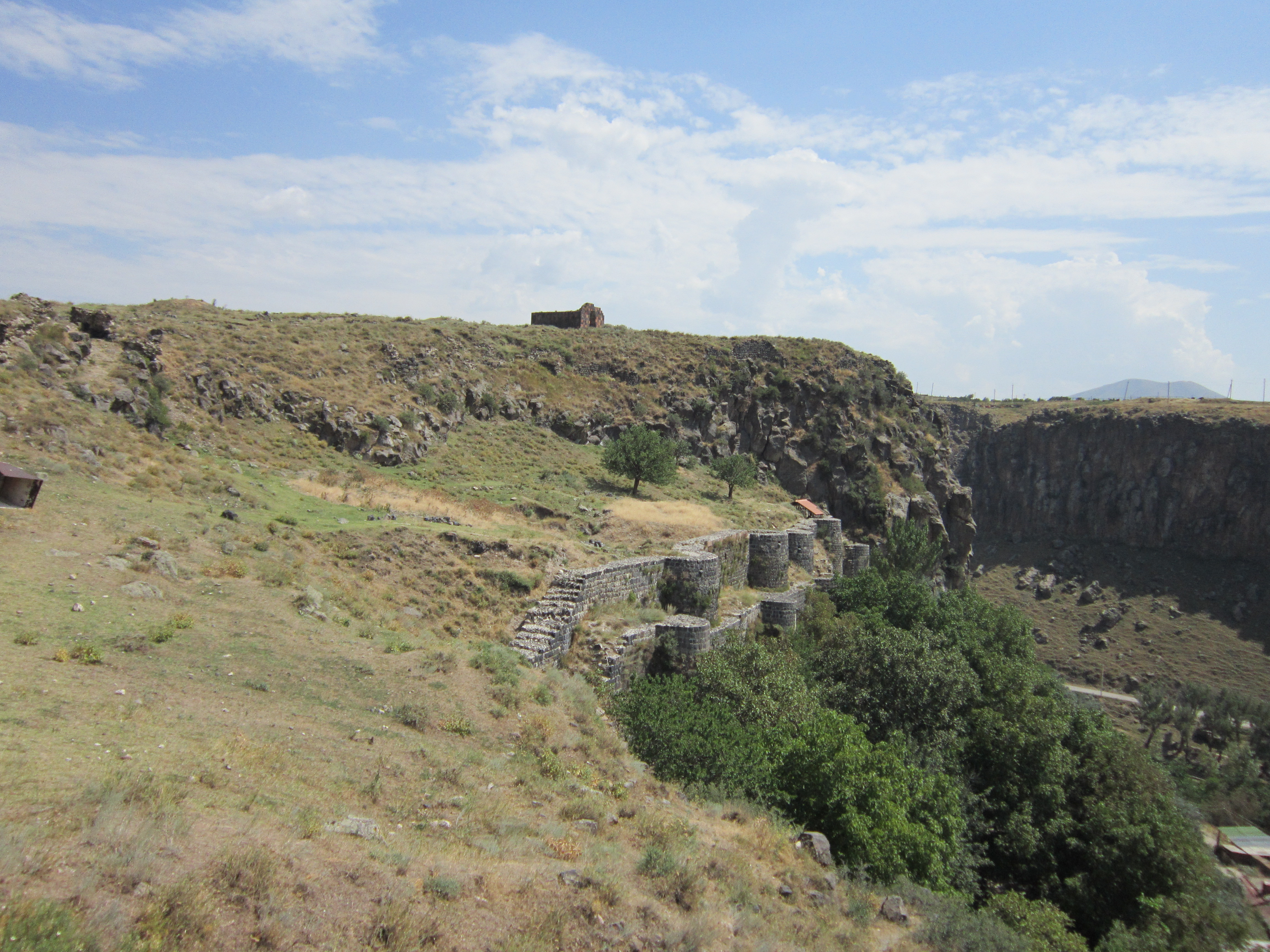

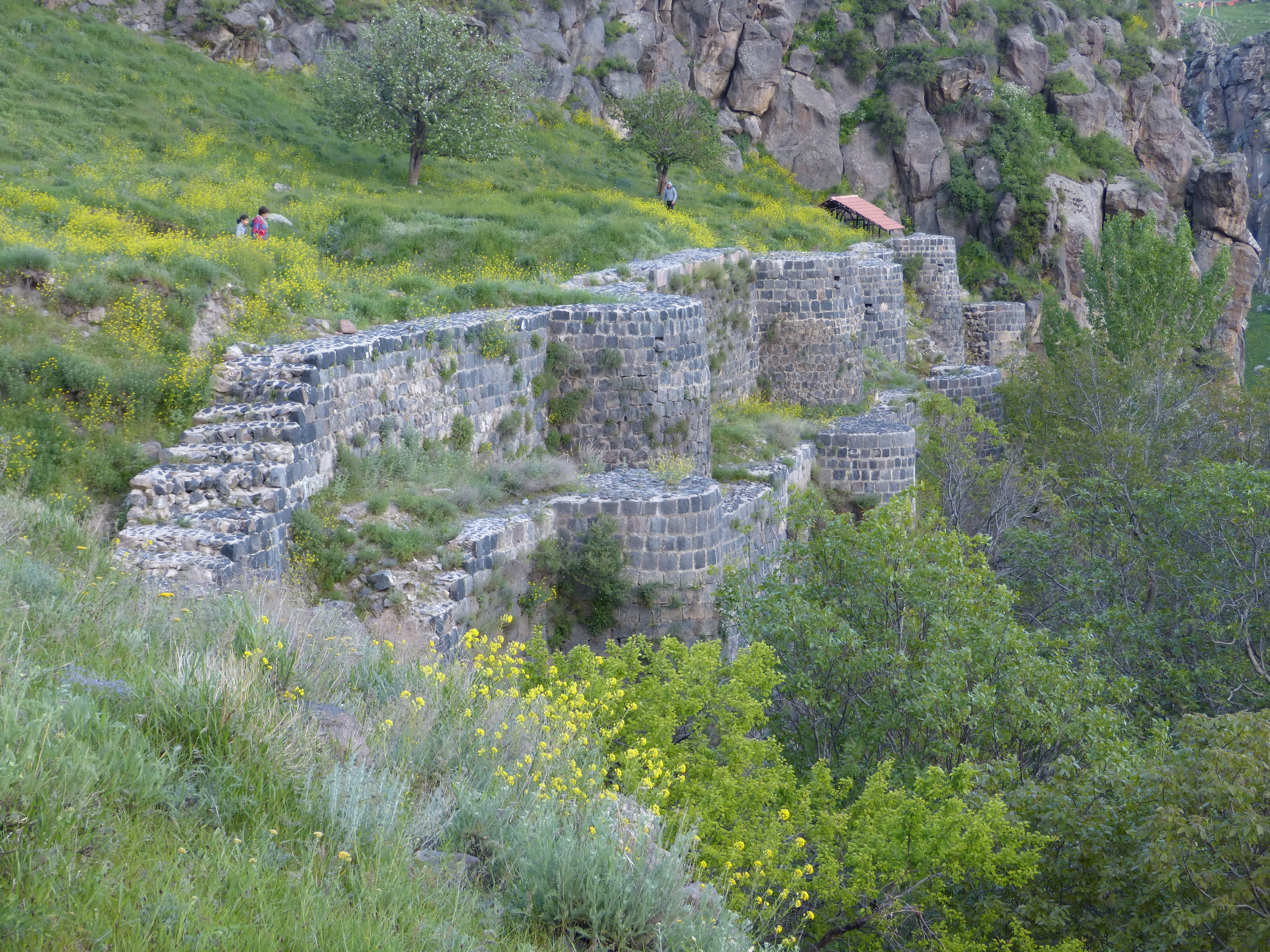
Walls of fortress

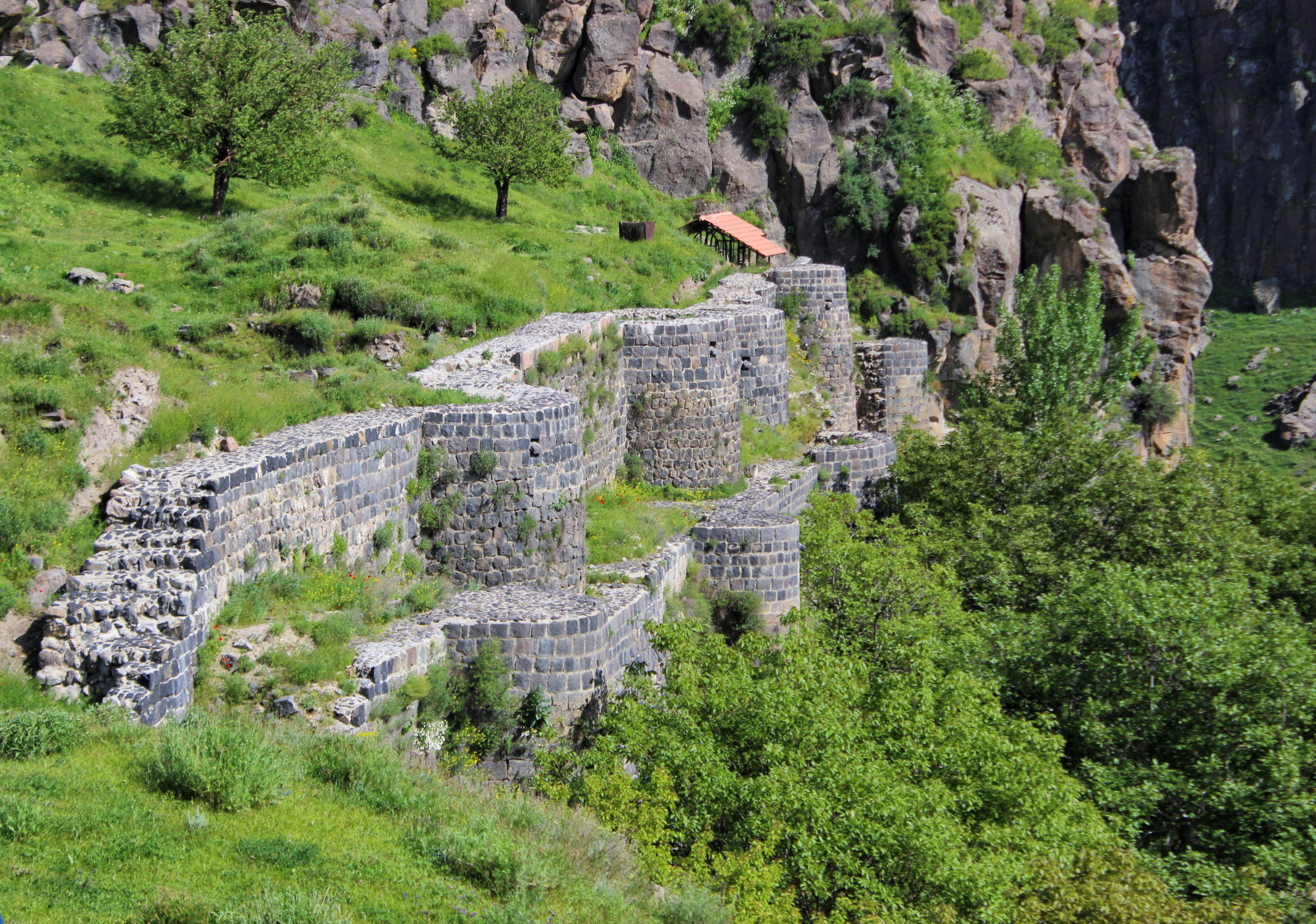

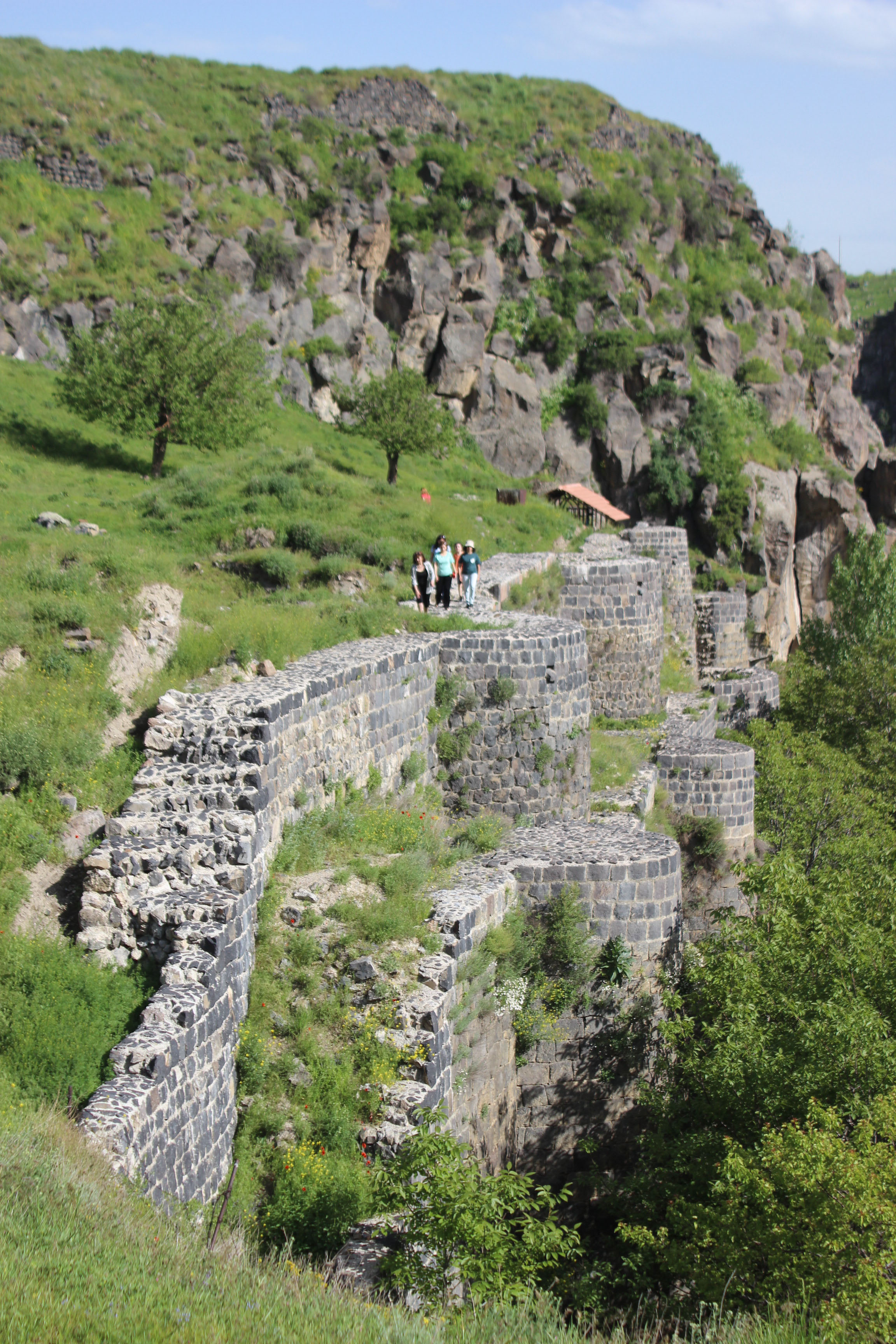

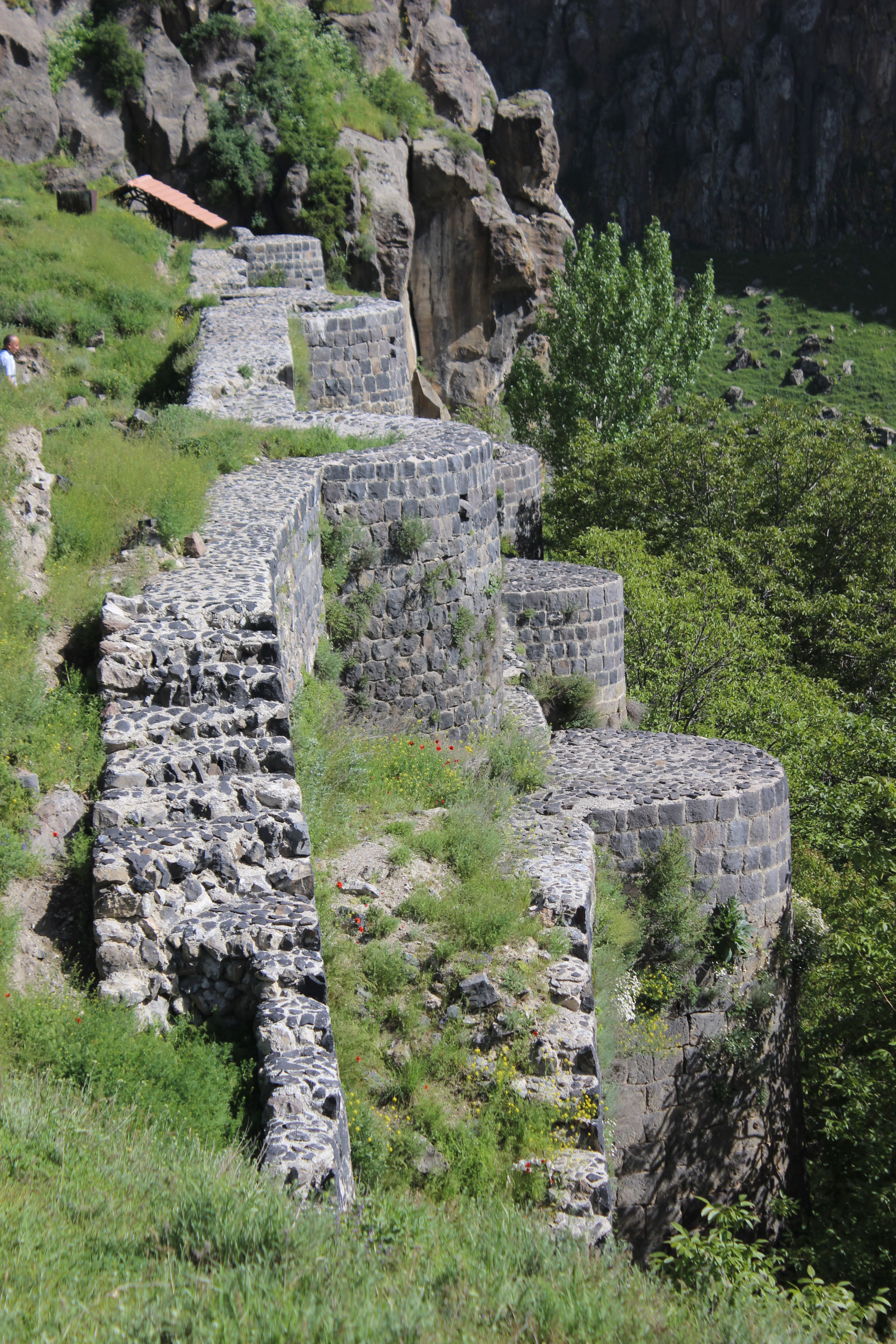

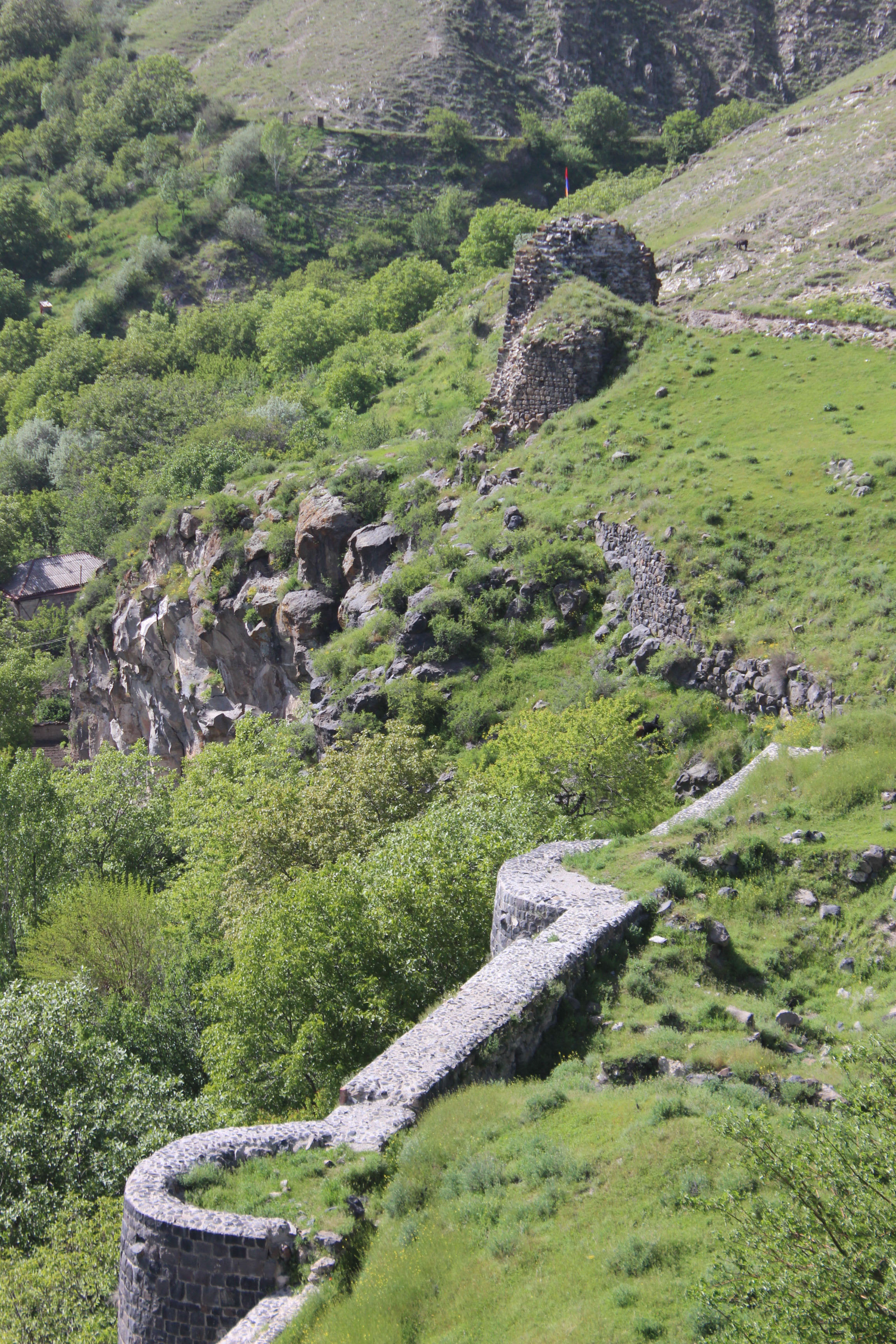

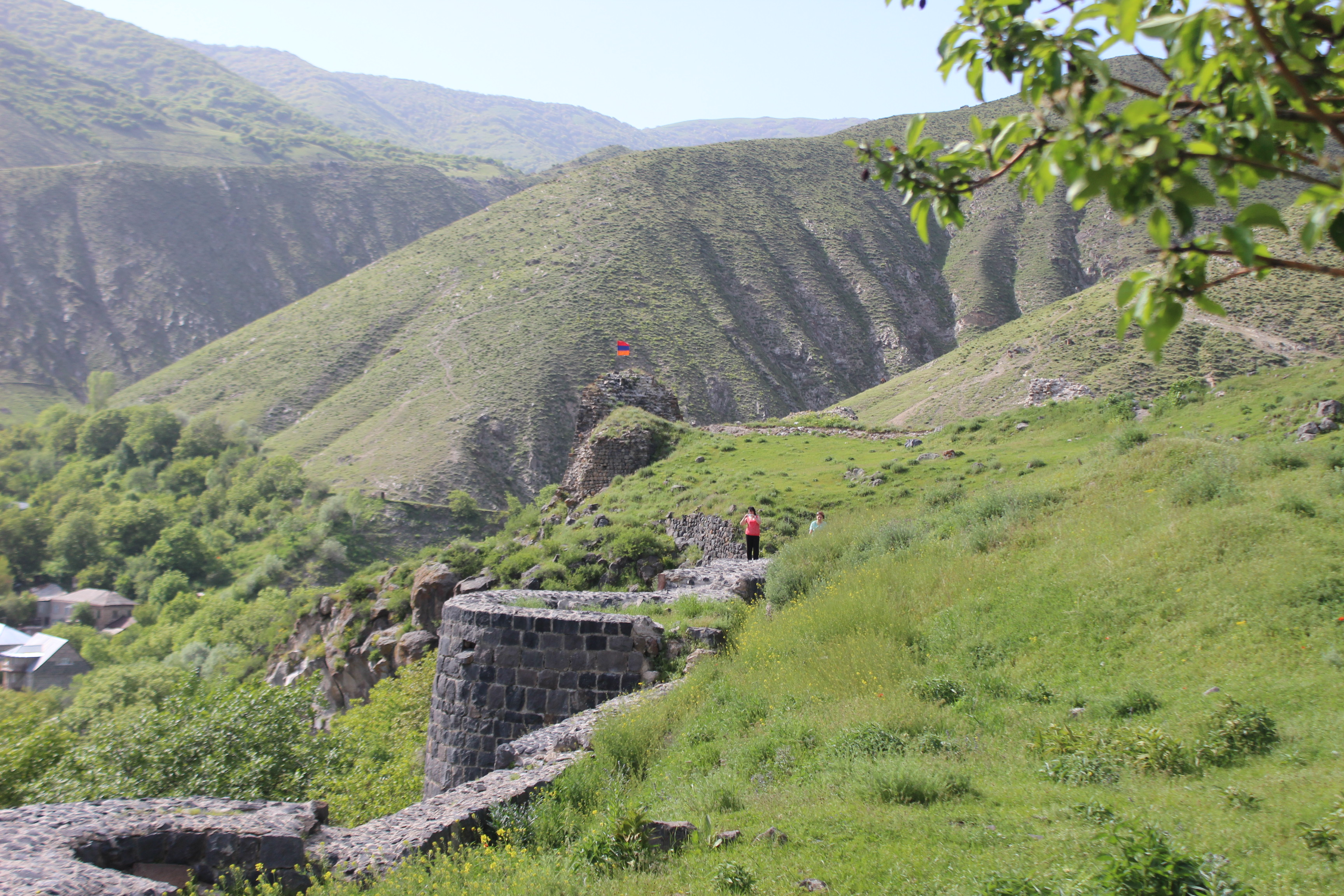

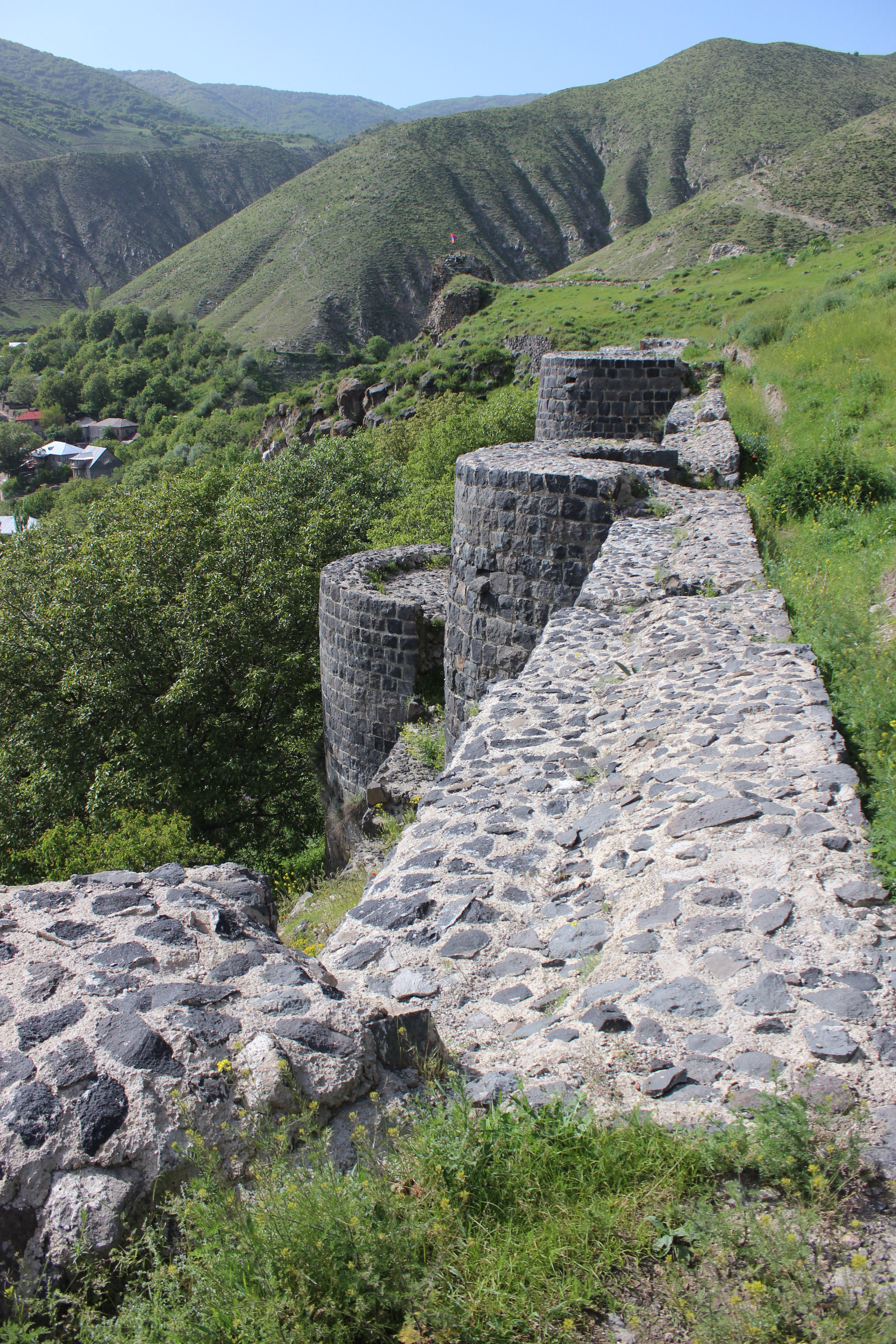

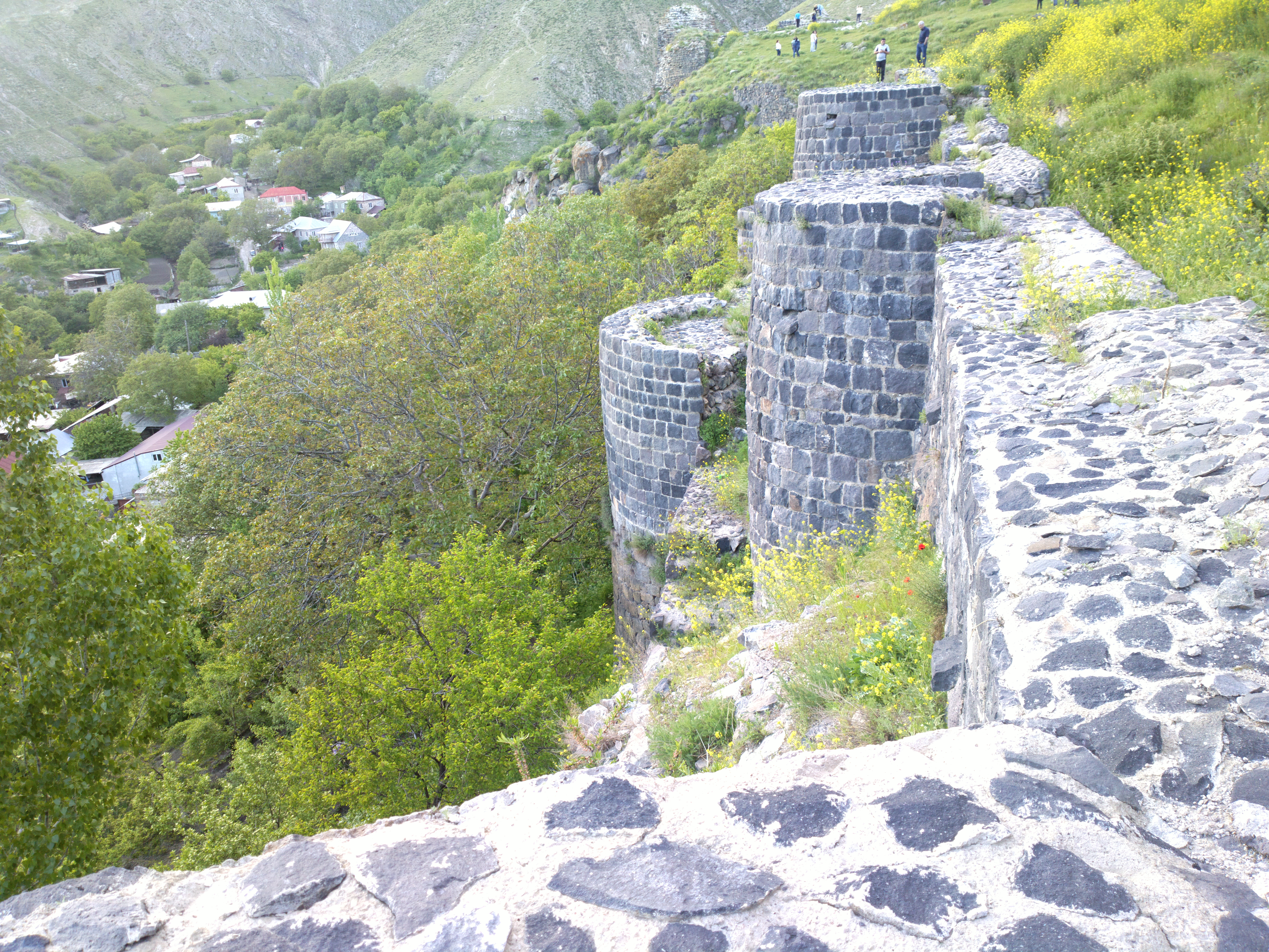

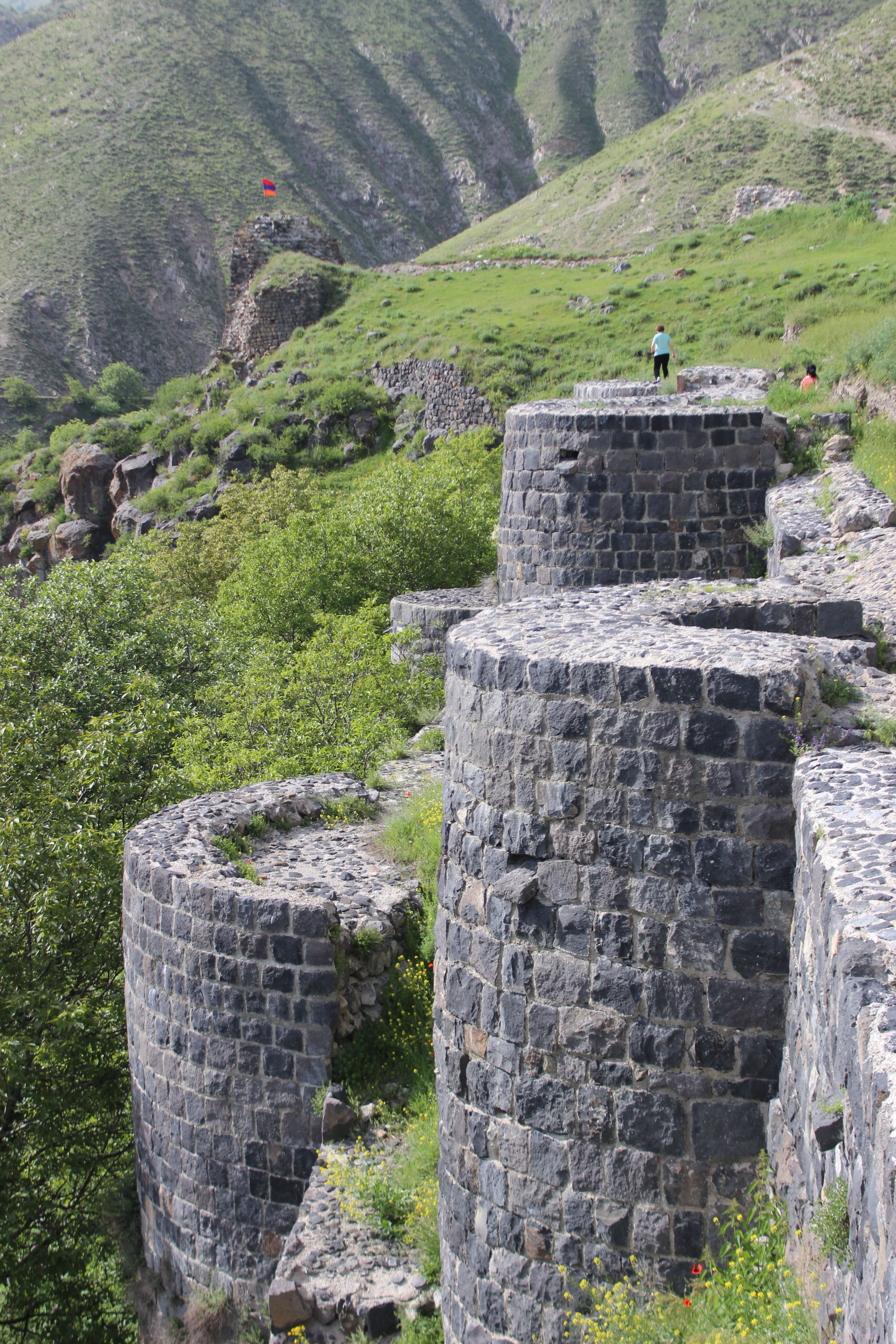

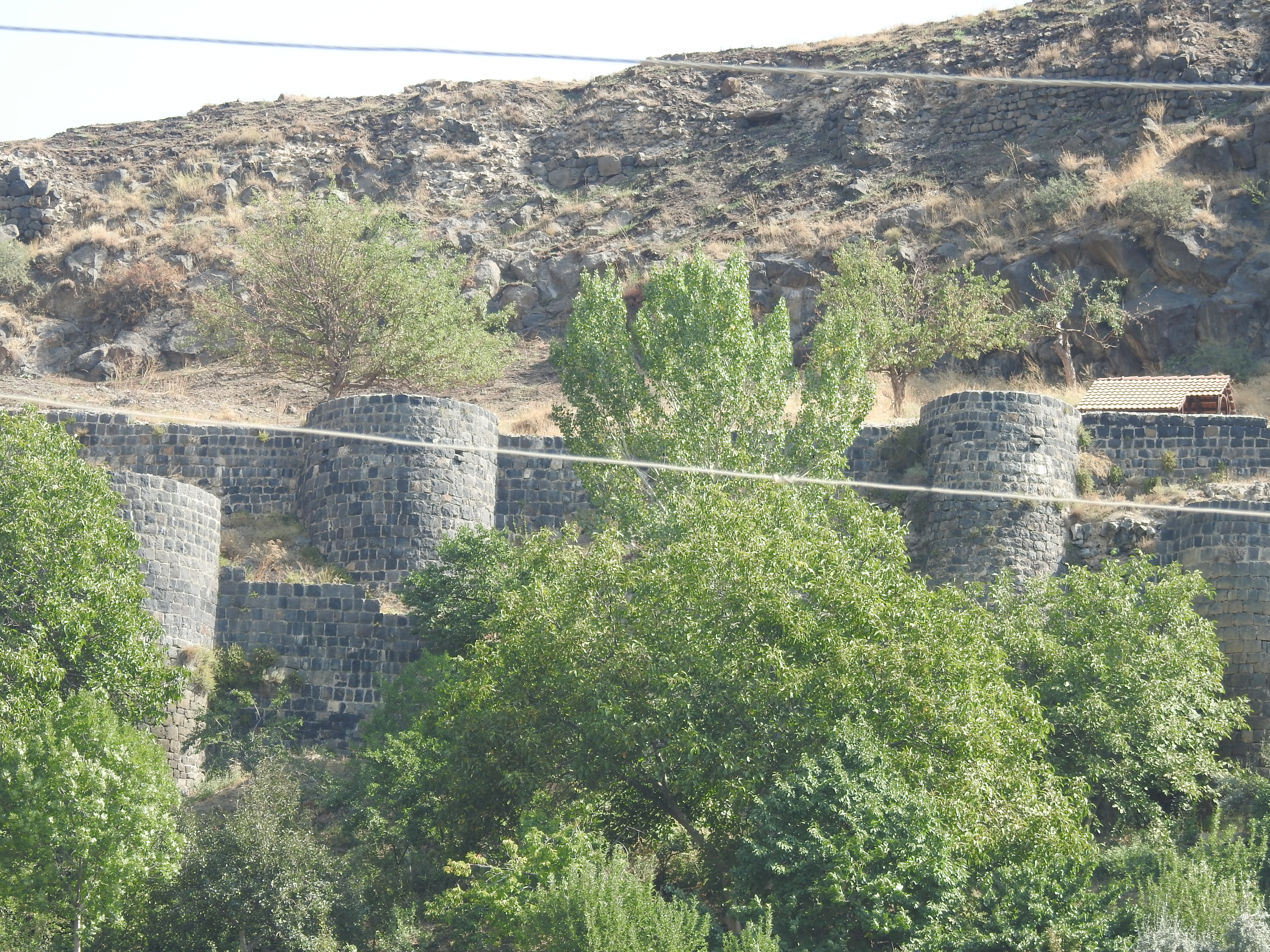

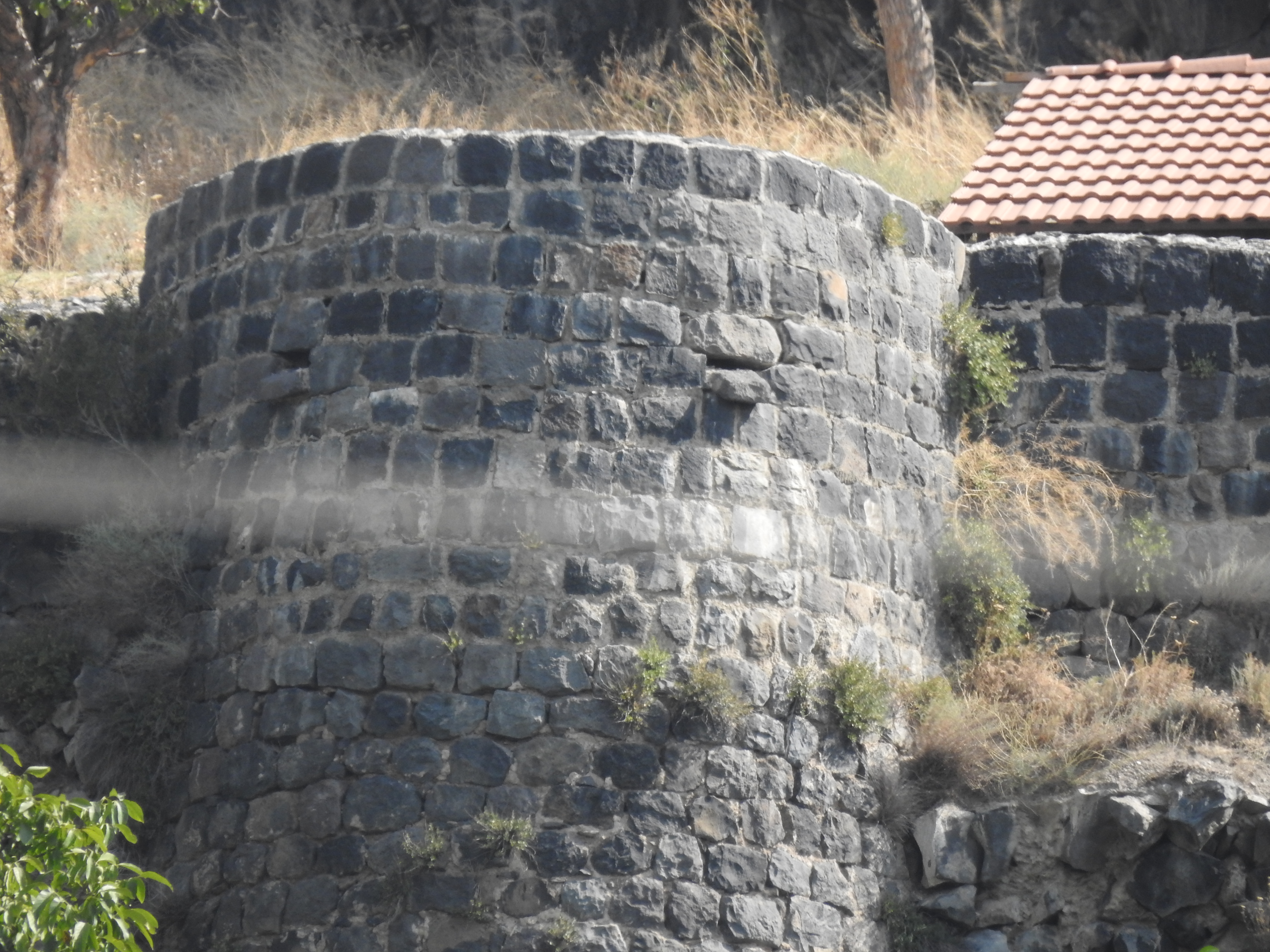

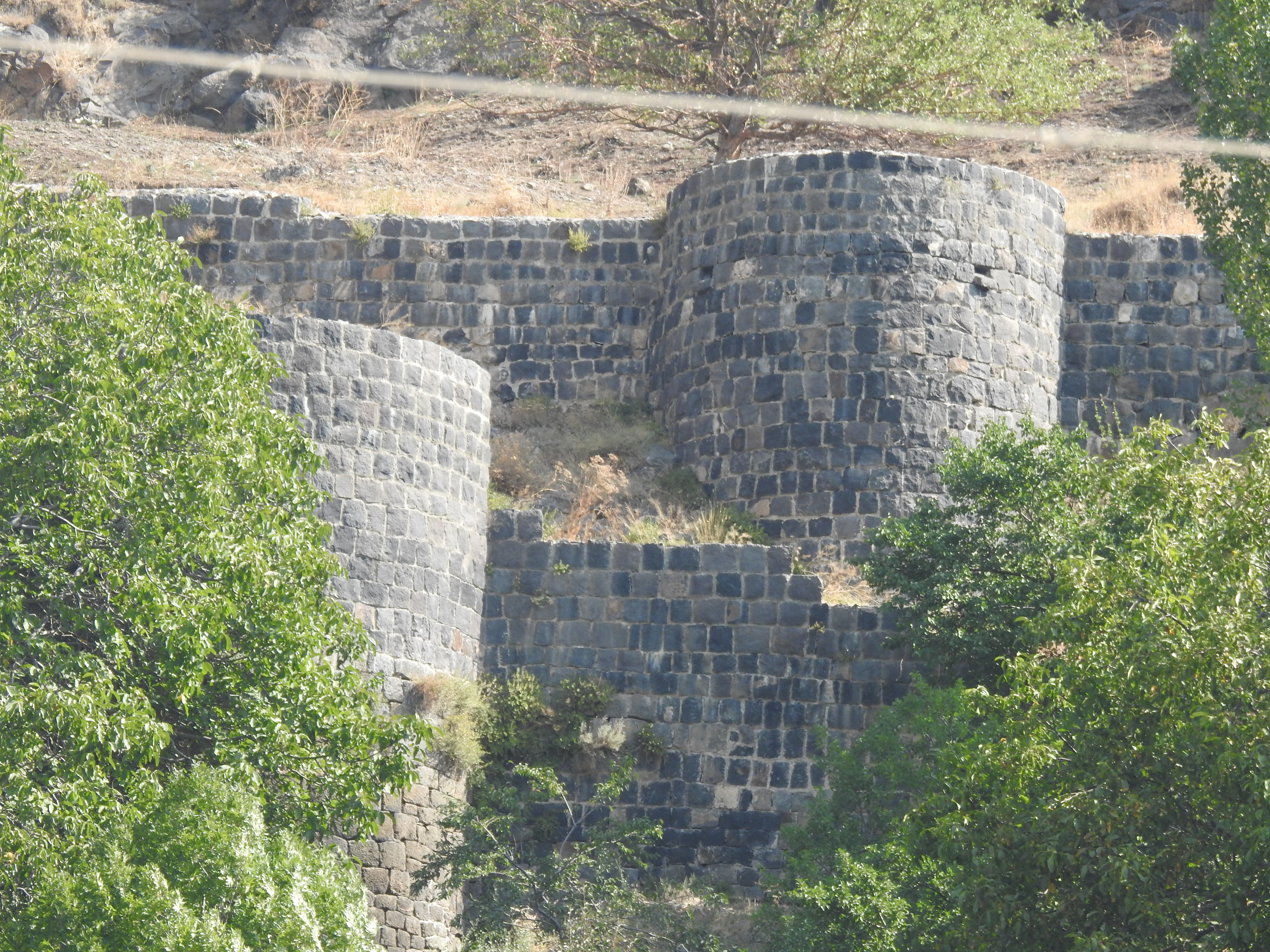

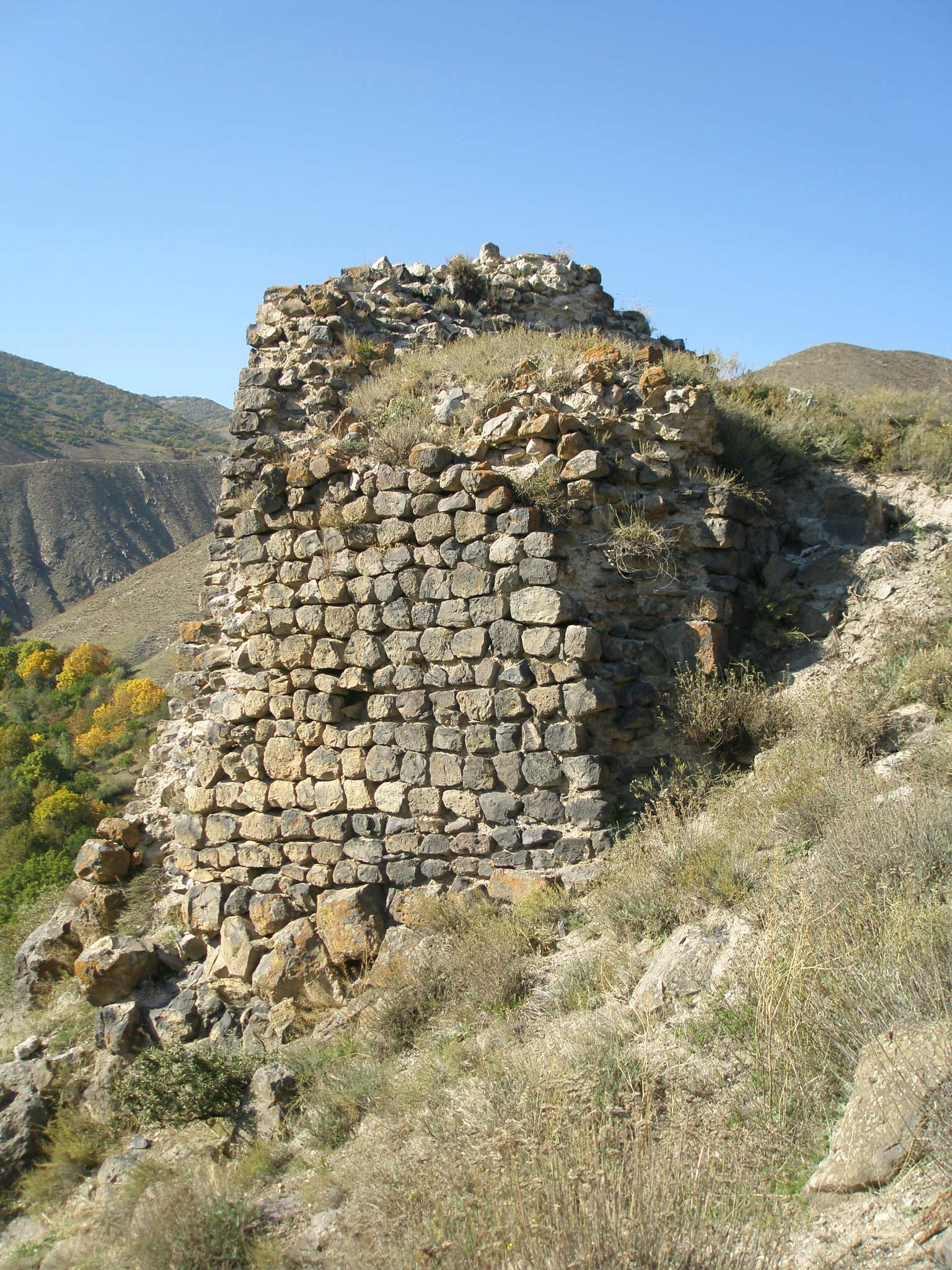
One of the original standing walls of the castle

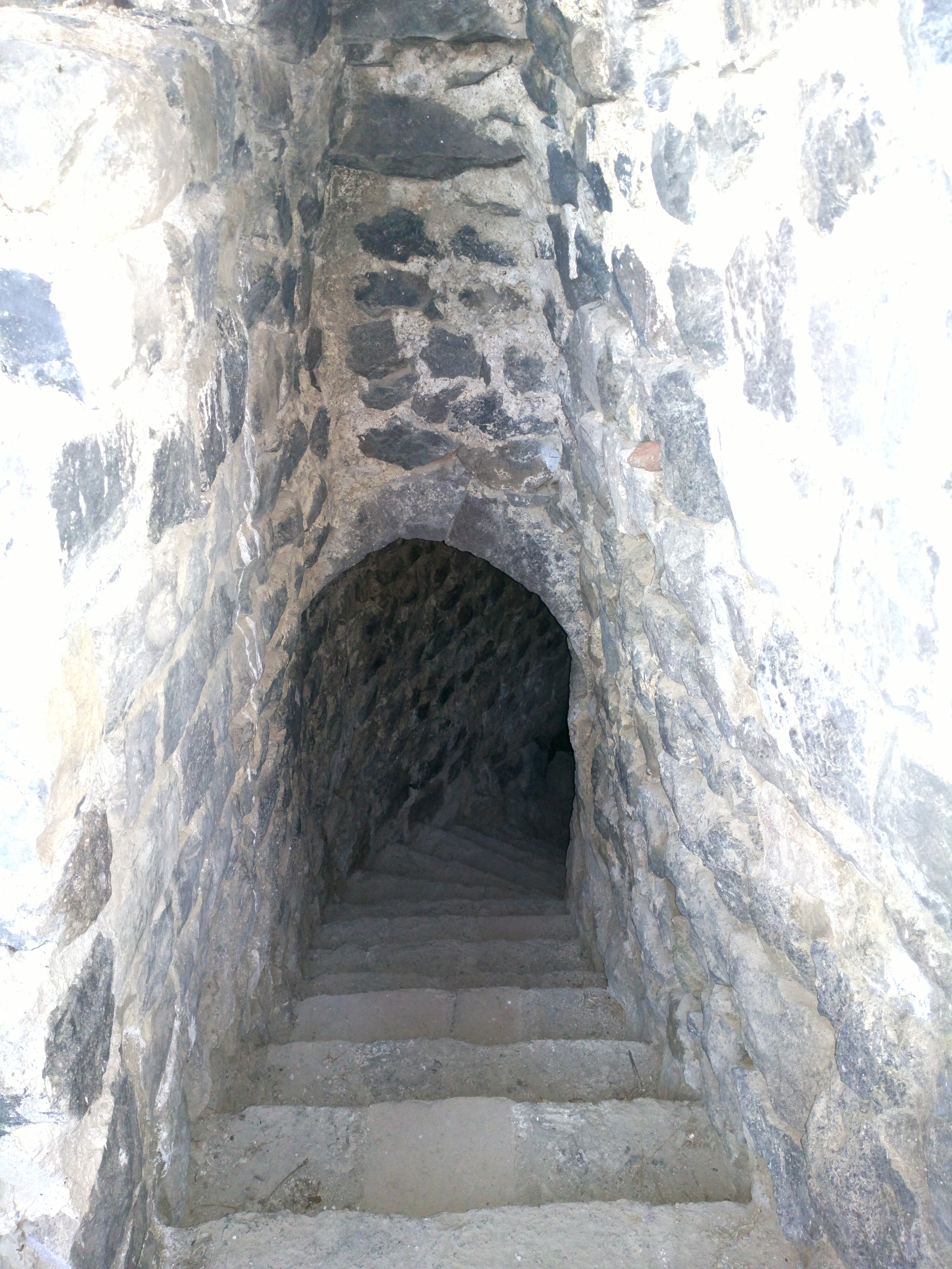
inside the fortress

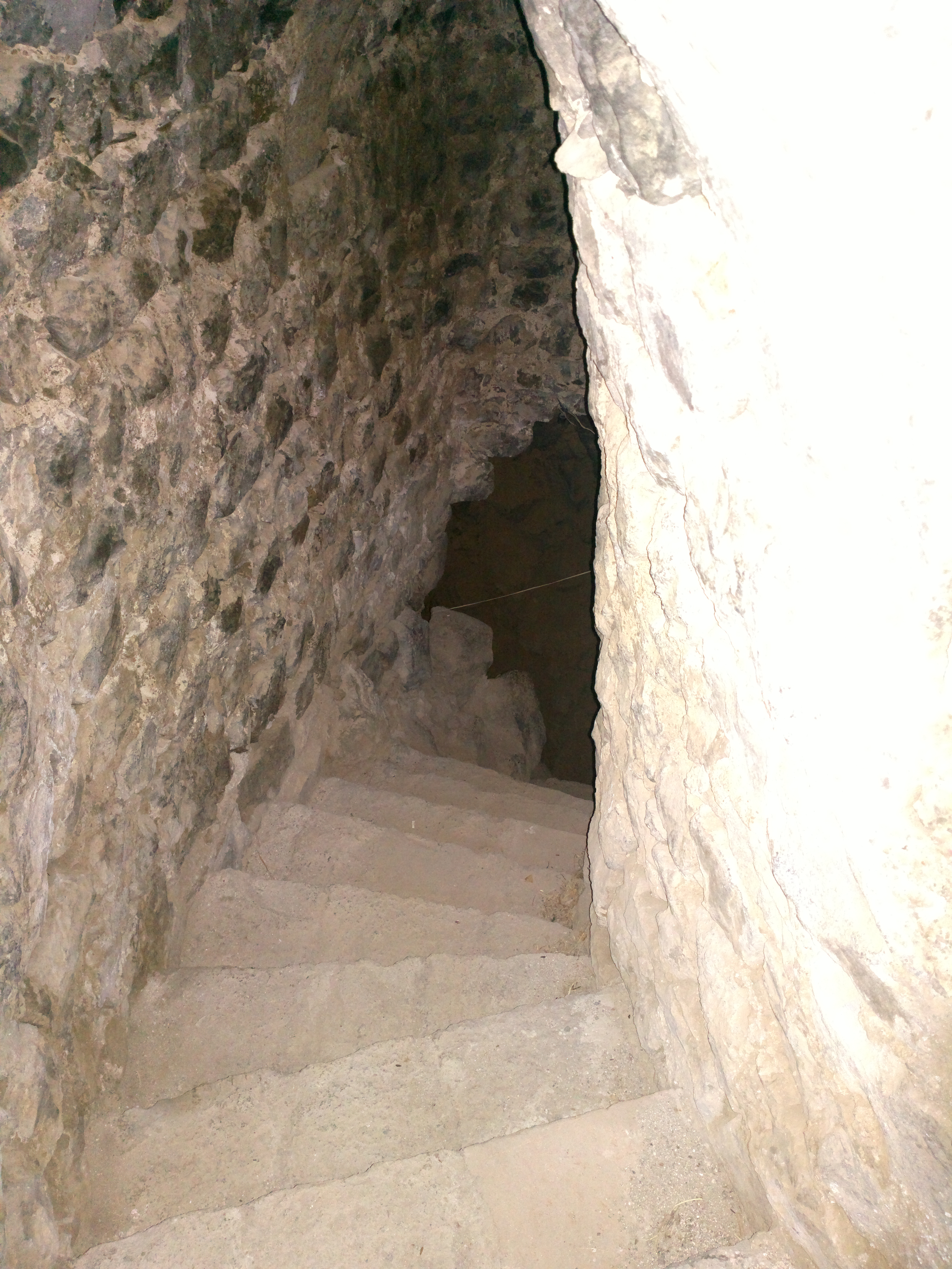

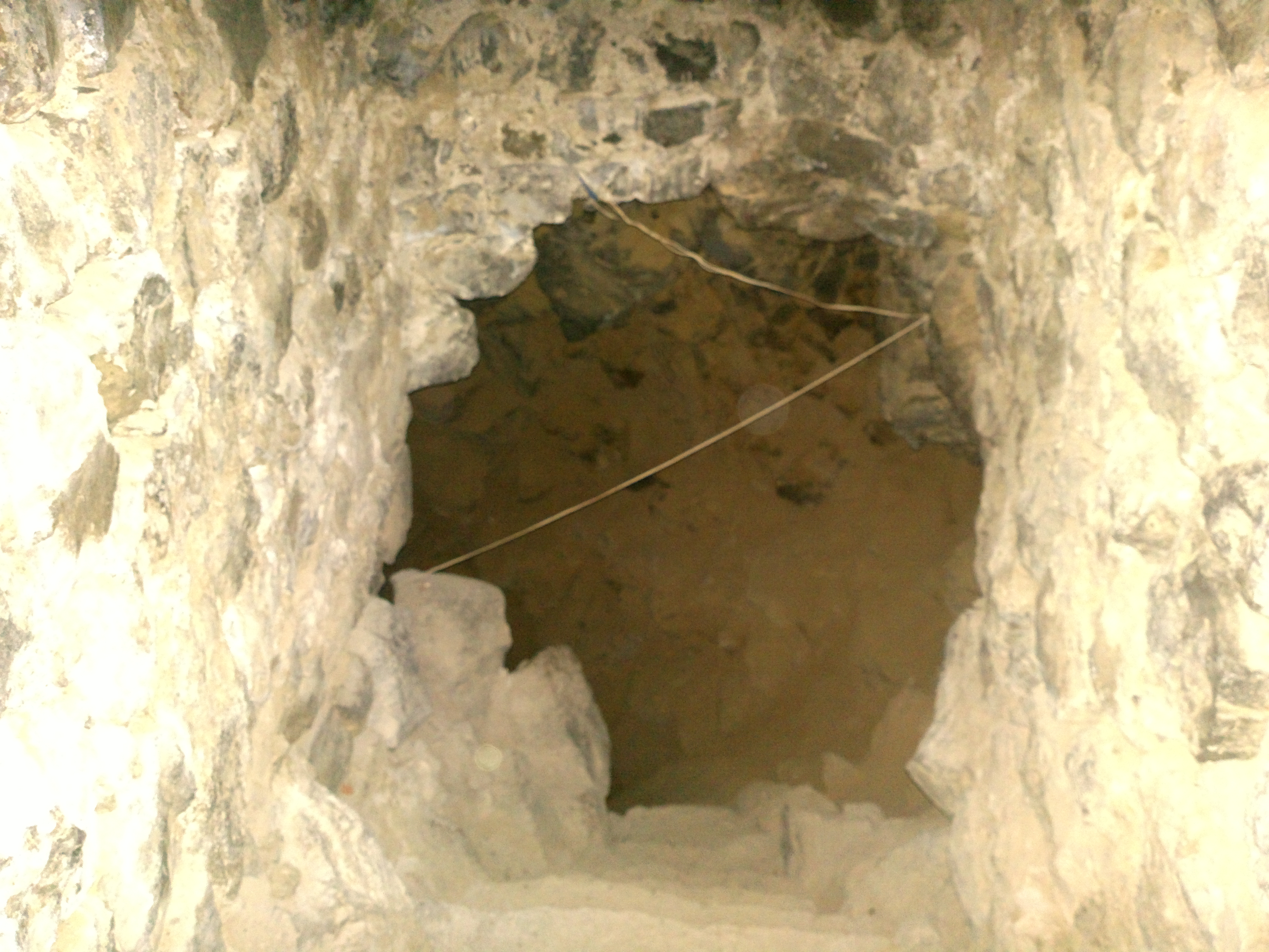

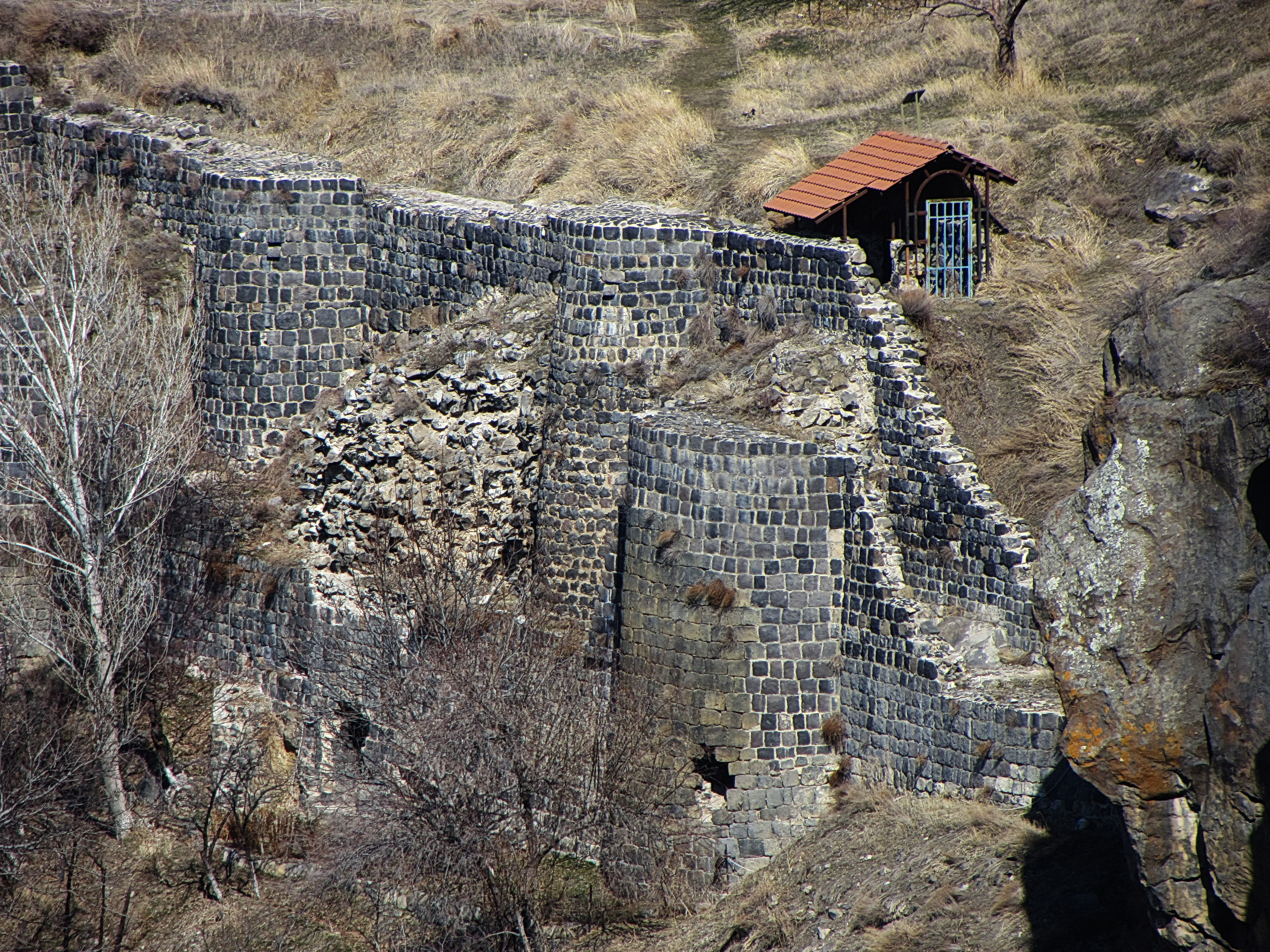

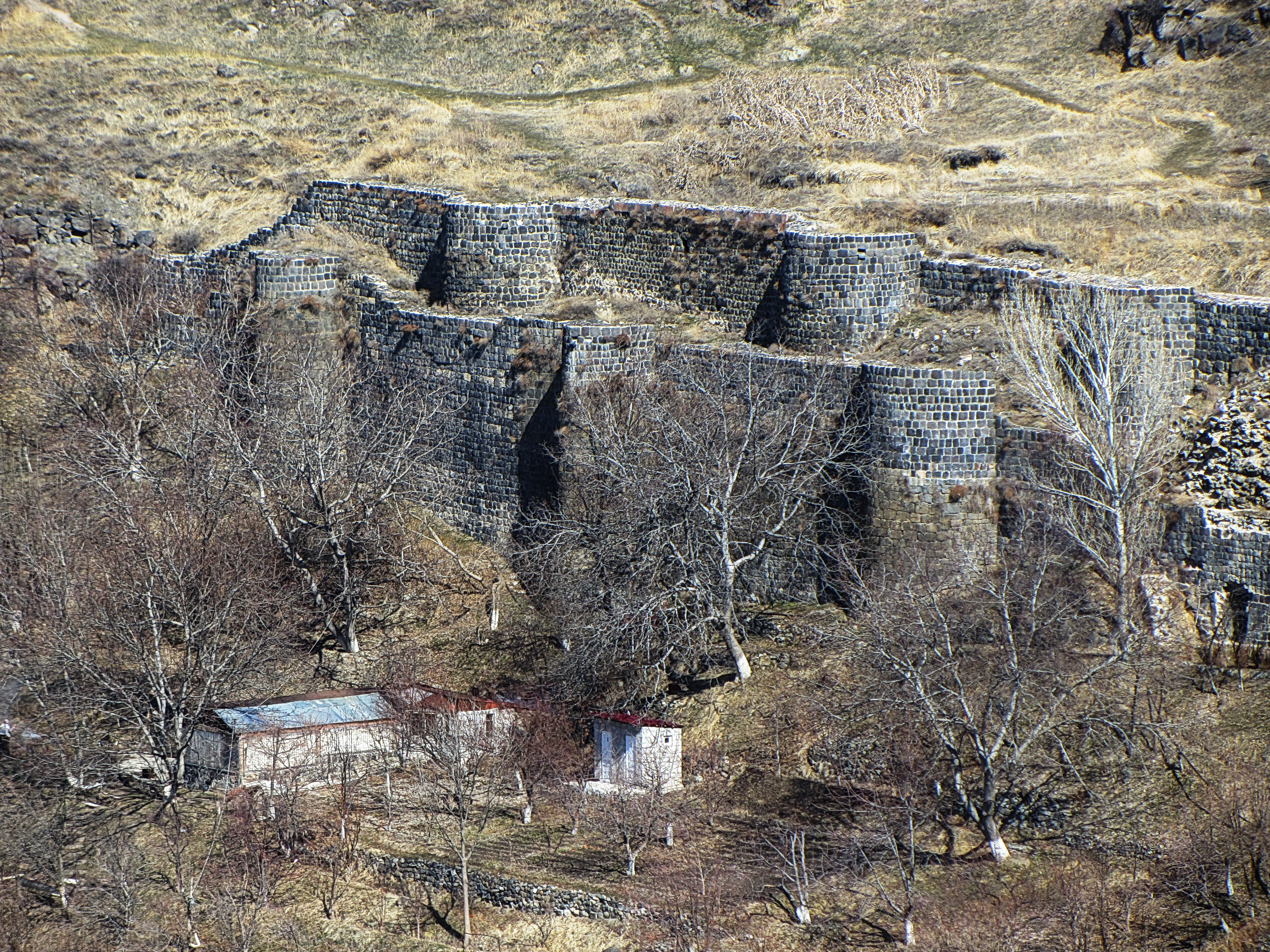

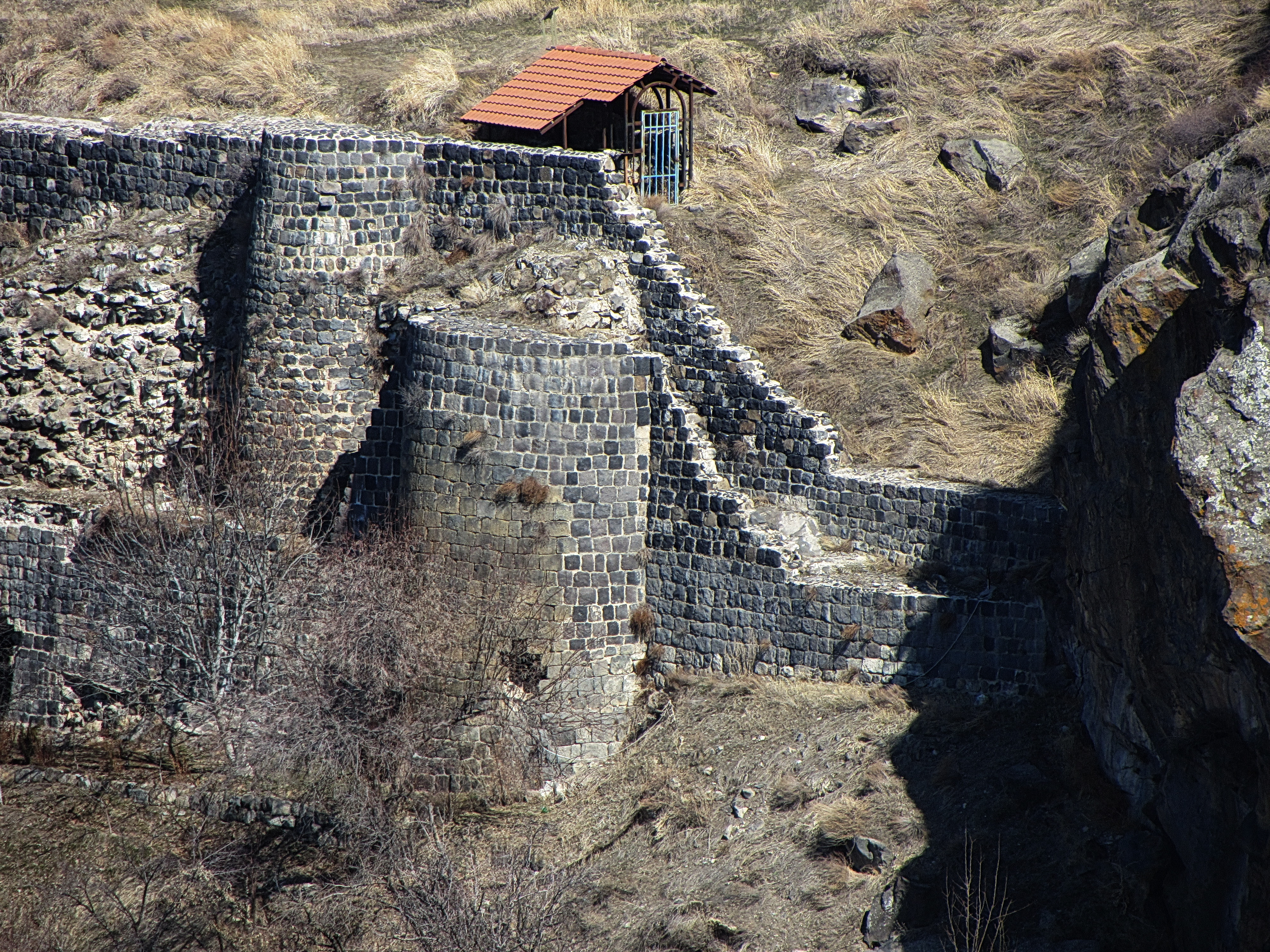

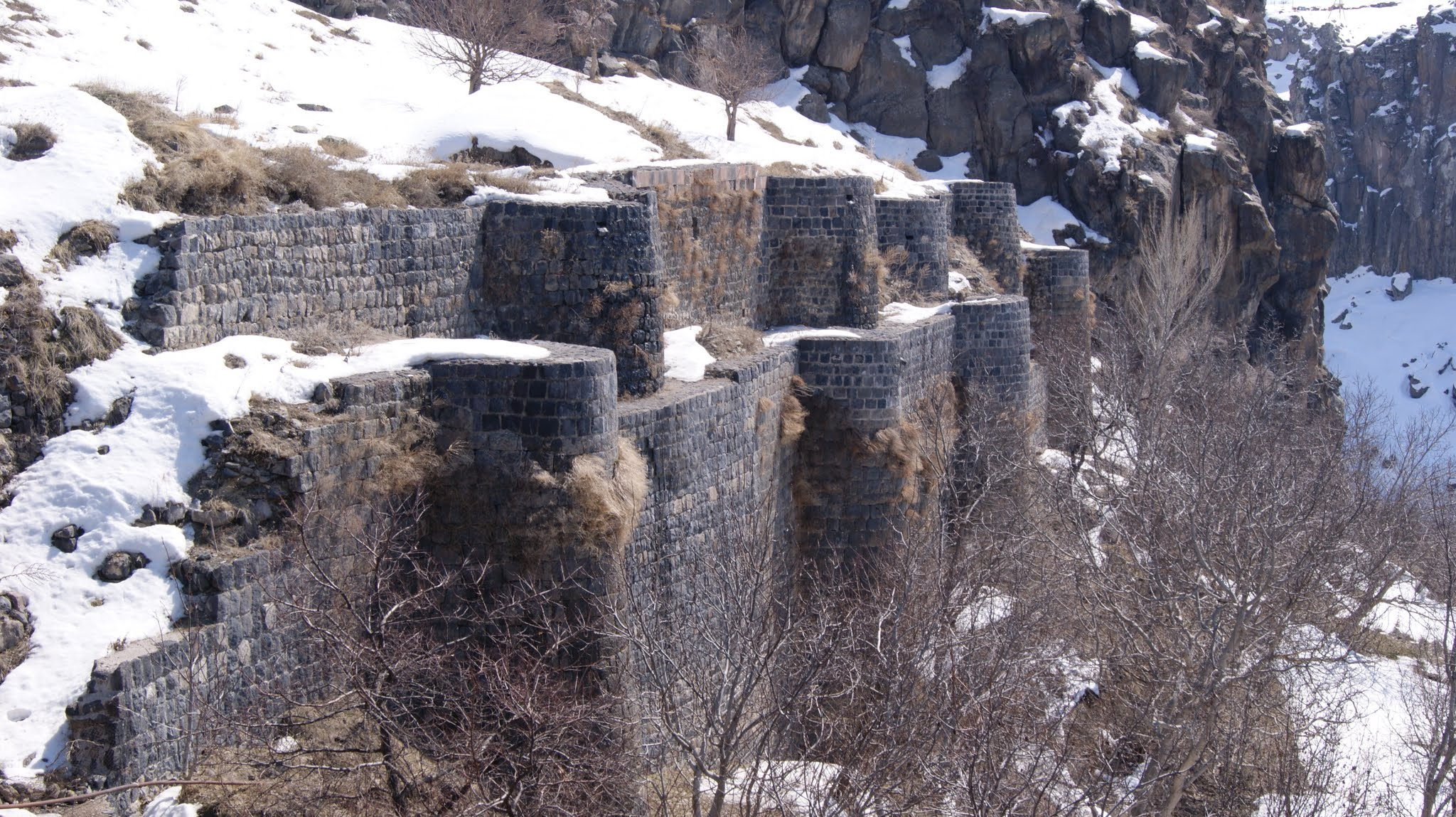
General view in snow winter

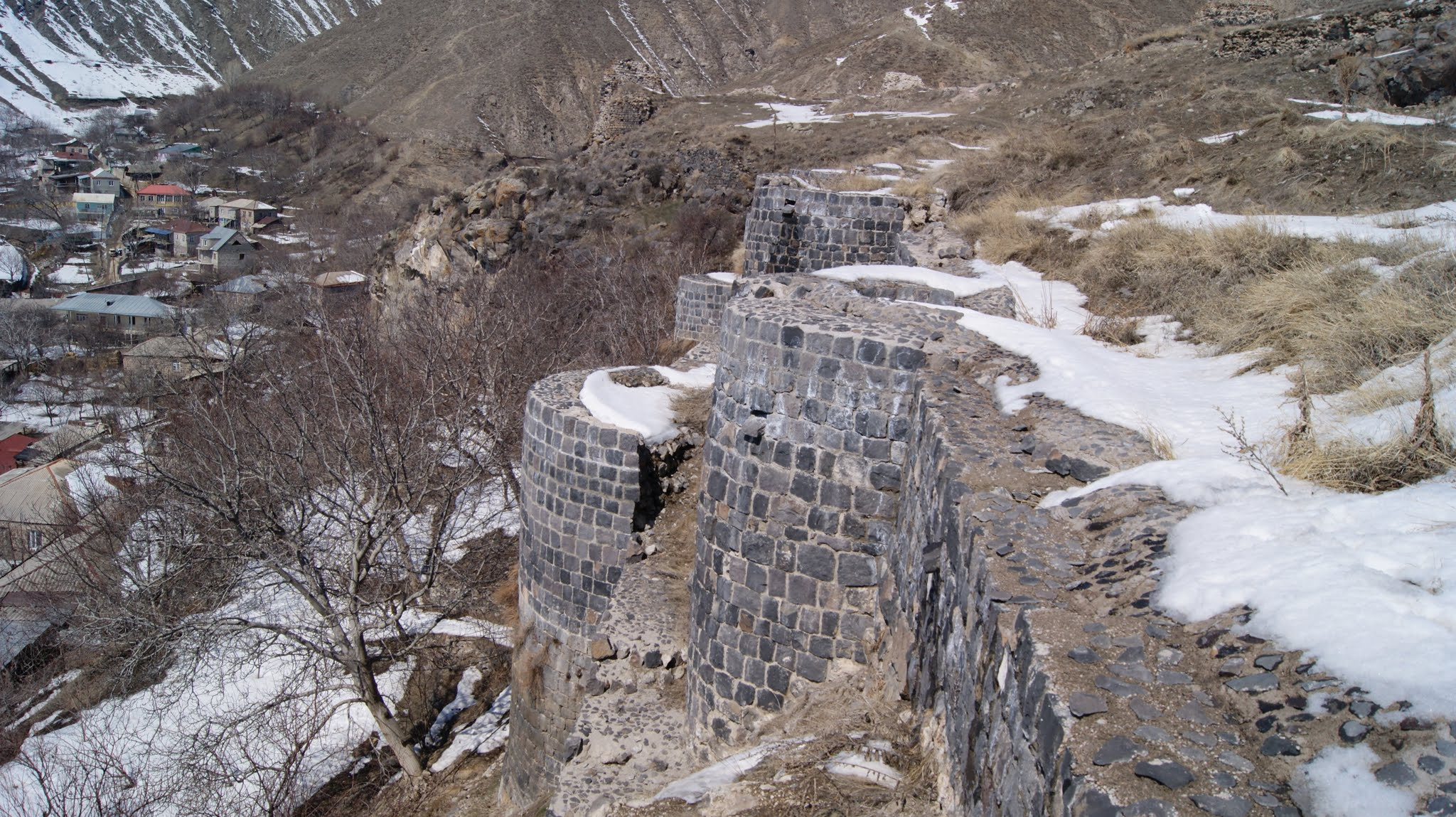

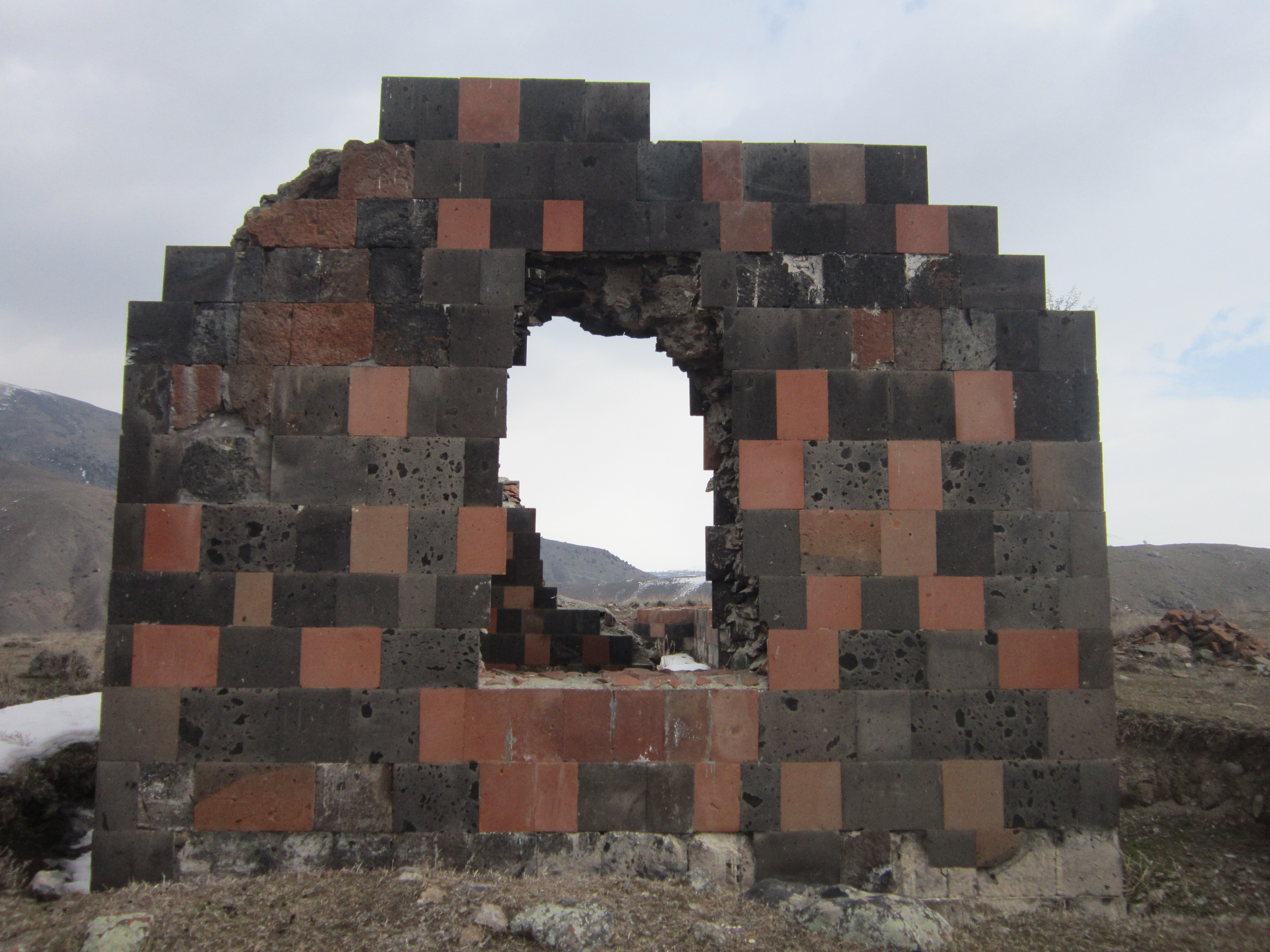

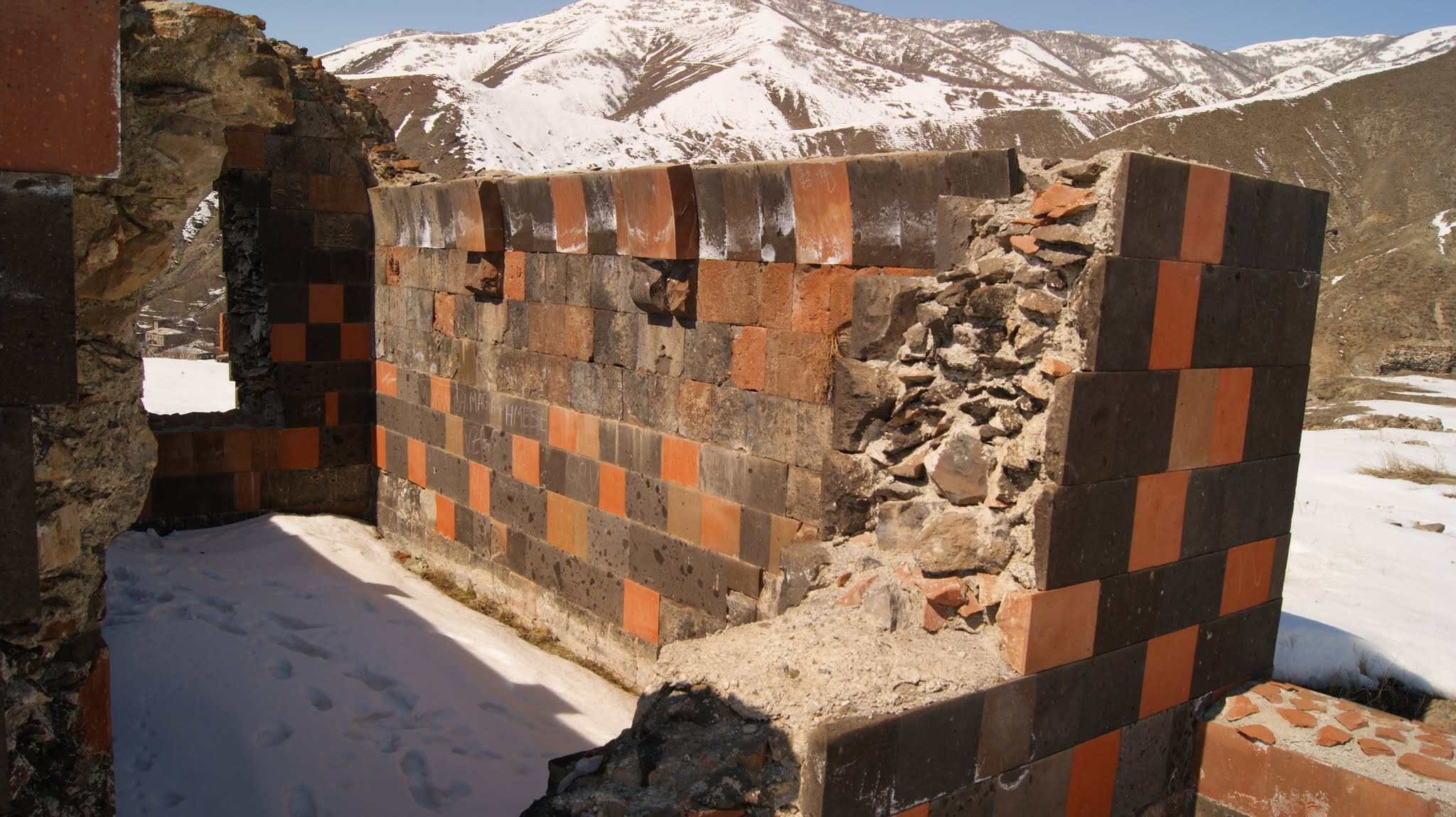
St. Xach church

== See also ==
- Bjni, Armenia
