= Pahlavuni =

Armenian noble family

Pahlavuni Պահլավունի
- Parent house: Kamsarakan
- Founded: After the 8th century
- Cadet branches: Zakarids-Mkhargrzeli; Hethumids

Pahlavuni (Armenian: Պահլավունի; classical orthography: Պահլաւունի) was an Armenian noble family, a branch of the Kamsarakan, that rose to prominence in the late 10th century during the last years of the Bagratuni monarchy.

== Origins ==
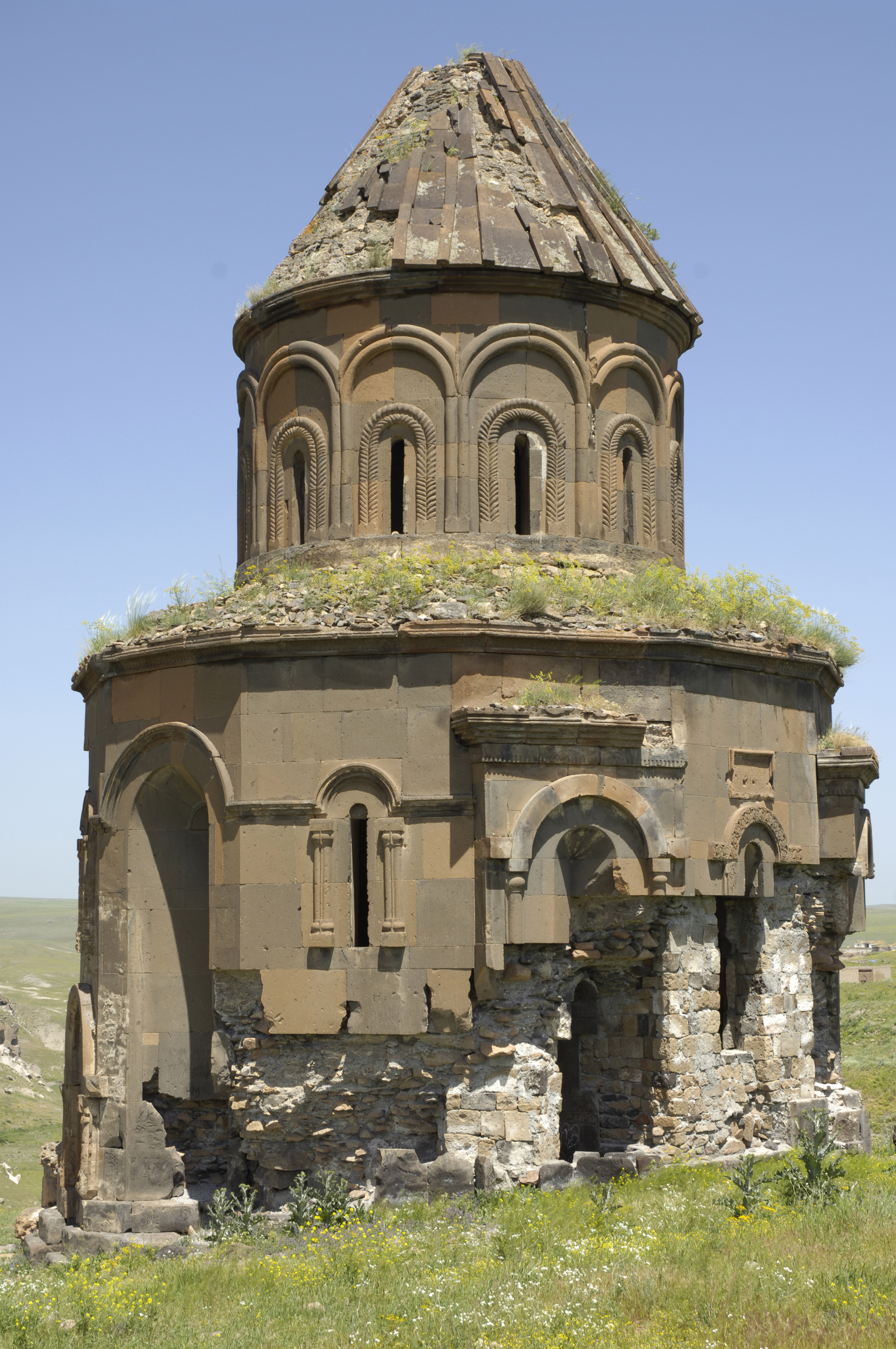
The church of St Gregory of the Abughamrents

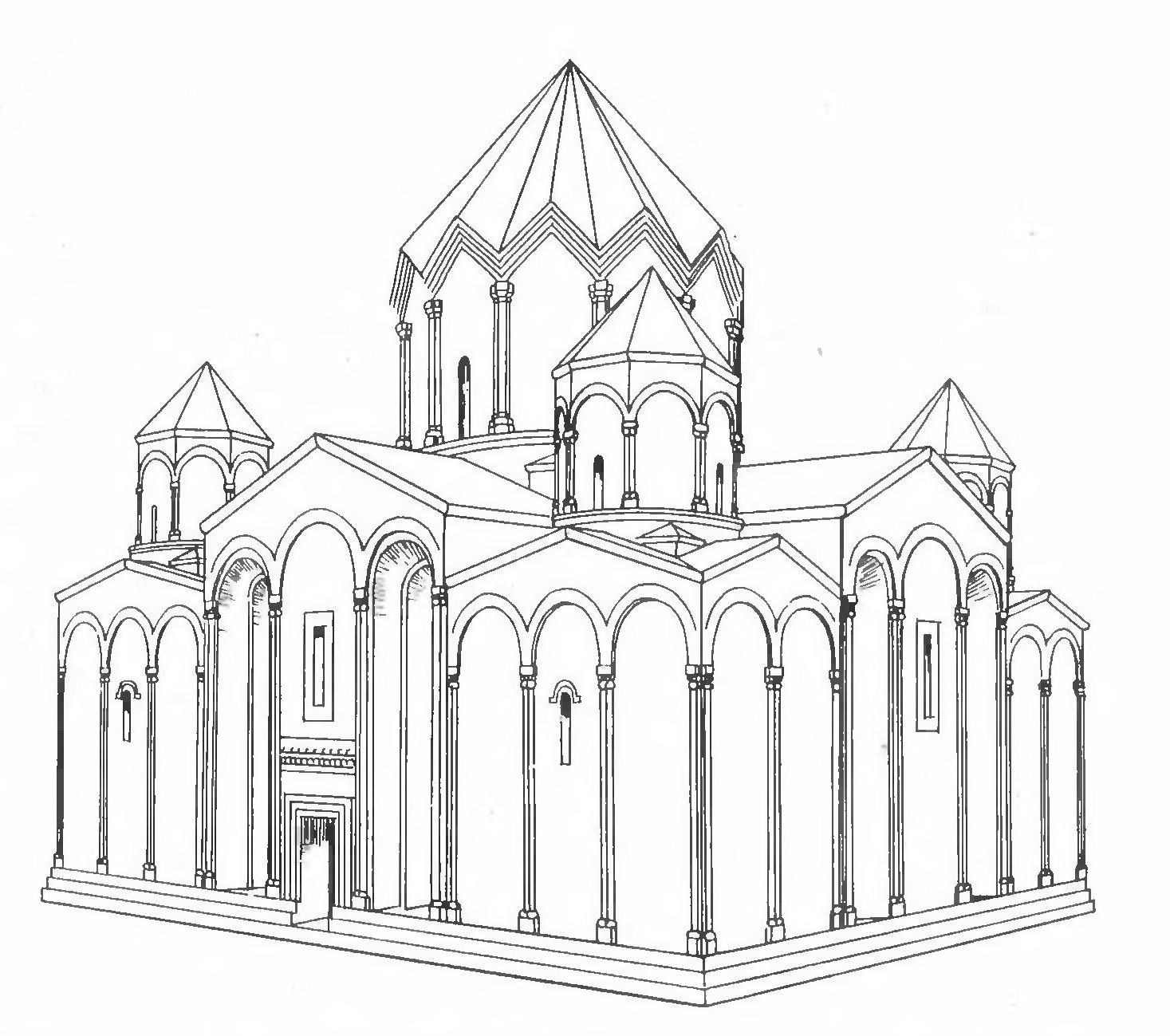
The Church of the Holy Apostles in Ani was dedicated by Abughamir Pahlavuni in 1031

The Pahlavunis (also spelled Pahlavounis) were an offshoot of the Kamsarakan noble house, which had ceased to exist as a result of a failed uprising against the Arab rule in Armenia, in the late 8th century. In 774 the nature of the Arab rule had provoked the Armenian nakharars into a major rebellion which included the Kamsarakans. The defeat of the rebels at the Battle of Bagrevand in April 775 was followed by ruthless suppression of opposition in the years that followed. The power and influence of the Kamsarakans along with other leading nakharar houses such as the Mamikonians and the Gnunis was destroyed for good. Those that survived were either exiles in the Byzantine Empire or dependants of other houses, chiefly the Artsruni and the Bagratuni. They were forced to sell their hereditary principalities to the Bagratunis, such as the regions of Shirak and Arsharunik. The Bagratuni Prince Ashot the Carnivorous bought the former estates of the Kamsarakan family around Arpa River near Mren, 34 km south of Ani which was also a Bagratuni possession.

== Branches ==
In the 11th century the Pahlavunis controlled and built various fortresses throughout Armenia such as Amberd and Bjni and played a significant role in all the affairs of the country. According to Cyril Toumanoff, following the abdication in 1045-46 of Prince Gregory II (who received from the court of Constantinople the rank of magistros and the office of duke of Mesopotamia, Vaspurakan, and Taron) in favor of the emperor, the Pahlavunis, under Oshin of Gandzak, moved to Cilician Armenia, forming the House of Hethumids. Toumanoff also names the Zakarid-Mxargrzeli house as branch of the Pahlavunis.

== Monastic constructions ==
=== Church of St Gregory of the Abughamrents ===
The church of St Gregory of the Abughamrents in Ani was dedicated by the Pahlavunis and probably dates from the late 10th century. It was built as a private chapel for the Pahlavuni family. Their mausoleum, built in 1040 and now reduced to its foundations, was constructed against the northern side of the church. The church has a centralised plan, with a dome over a drum, and the interior has six exedera. The church has an inscription by Vahram Pahlavuni, dated to 1031-1033:

By the will of God, I, Vahram, Prince of Princes, have given the moneys for the soul of my son Apughamr, and I bought two stores from the Ochakanians, those of Loragouyn and Orsaut, and gave them to Saint Gregory, so that the priest of that church must hold a mass office three times a year. And may anyone, among kin or foreigners, who opposes this, be dammned by the Father, the Son and the Spirit, as well as the 318 Fathers, and be held accountable before God of the sins of Apughamr

— Dedicatory inscription, Church of St Gregory of the Abughamrents.

=== Church of the Holy Apostoles ===
The Church of the Holy Apostles in Ani was dedicated by Abughamir Pahlavuni in 1031.

== Sources ==
- Toumanoff, C. (2010). "KAMSARAKAN". In Yarshater, Ehsan (ed.). Encyclopædia Iranica. Vol. XV/5: Ḵamsa of Jamāli–Karim Devona. London and New York: Routledge & Kegan Paul. pp. 453–455. ISBN 978-1-934283-28-8.
