= Bjni =

Bjni Բջնի
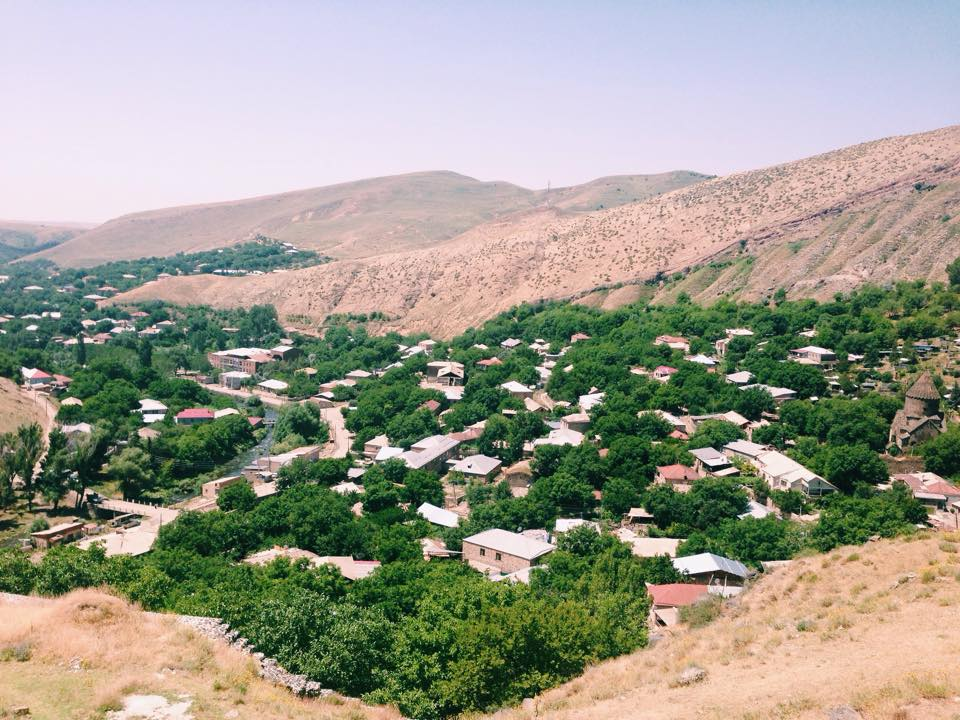

- Location within Armenia
- Coordinates: 40°27′34″N 44°38′55″E
- Country: Armenia
- Province: Kotayk
- First Mentioned: Ghazar Parpetsi

Government
  - Mayor: Armen Matevosyan
- Elevation: 1,550 m (5,090 ft)

Population (2011)
  - Total: 2,547

Bjni (Armenian: Բջնի), is a village in the Kotayk Province of Armenia. It is situated in a valley between canyon walls and a small river. The village is one of the prominent centers of education and culture of ancient and medieval Armenia. It is the birthplace of the 11th-century scholar Grigor Magistros.

== History ==
The first recorded mention of the village was by the 5th- to 6th-century chronicler and historian Ghazar Parpetsi.

In the 11th century, the lands of Bjni were passed to the Pahlavuni family and played a significant role in Armenian life during the Bagratuni dynasty. Around this time, King Hovhannes-Smbat made the decision that the lands should become an Episcopal settlement. In 1066, the election for the Patriarch took place in Bjni. At the beginning of the 13th century, the lands were passed on to the Zakharyan family. A century later in the years 1387-1388 the Turko-Mongol conqueror Timur Lenk destroyed the village of Bjni. The French traveler Jean Chardin visited the village in 1673, and in 1770 it was visited by the traveler Tournefort.

The remains of the 9th- to 10th-century Bjni Fortress of the Pahlavuni family sit along the top and sides of a mesa that divides the village almost in half. The larger portion of the village is located west of the mesa and curves south, while a smaller portion is east. The walls of the fortress may only be seen from the western side of the village, and are easiest reached via a dirt road that forks (take the left fork) and goes up the side of the hill. At the top of the mesa, there are some sections of walls still preserved, traces of where foundations had once been, the stone foundation of a church from the 5th century, a medieval structure that still stands (currently being rebuilt), two cisterns one with vaulting still partially intact, and a covered passage that leads to the river.

Bjni is home to other churches as well. The largest of the churches is Surb Astvatsatsin built in 1031, which sits within the village just west of the mesa. To the south of the church a few houses down, there is the small church of Surb Gevorg built in the 13th century. Some nice khachkars are built into the walls of the structure. On the eastern portion of the village atop a rock outcrop next to a modern cemetery is the church of Surb Sarkis built in the 7th century. It is the smallest of all of the churches. There are supposedly three other chapels/shrines in the vicinity, one of which sits between the fortress and the village and is constructed of very large stones.

Many manuscripts from Bjni dated to the 12th to 17th centuries have survived.

== Gallery ==
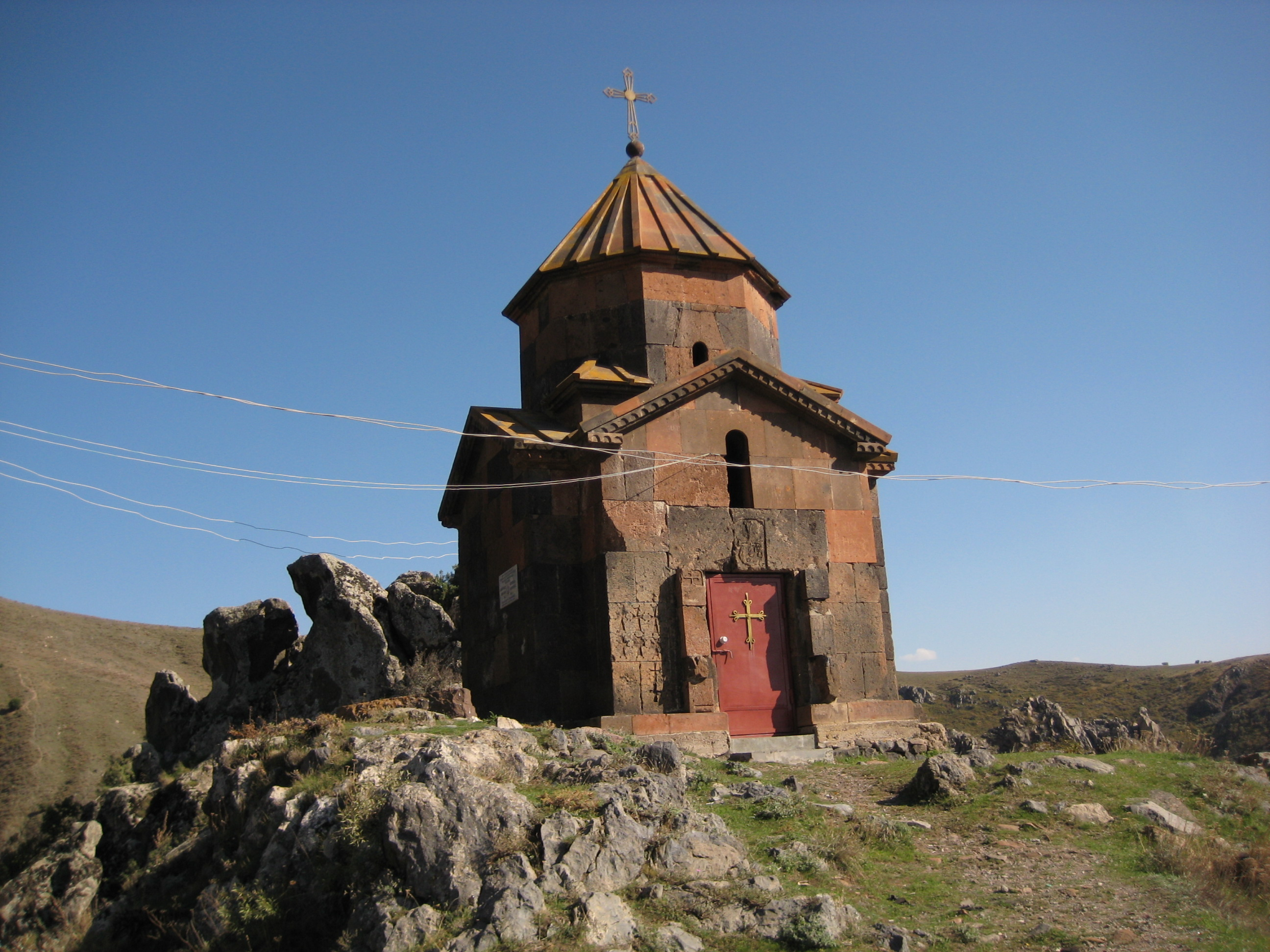
Church of Saint Sargis atop a stone outcrop in the middle of the village east of the fortress.

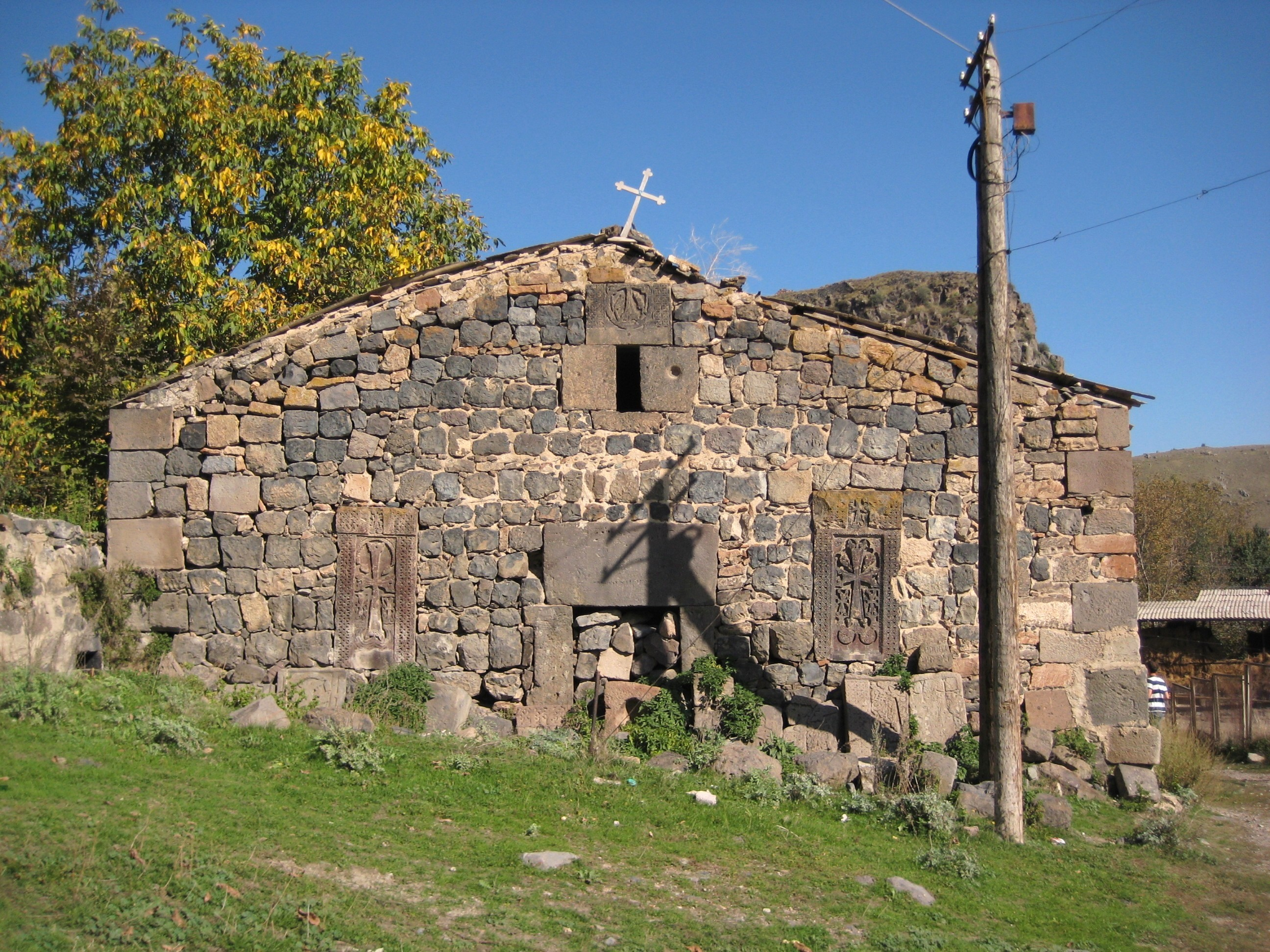
The church of Surb Gevorg (Saint George) built in the 13th century sits just a couple houses away from Bjni Church.

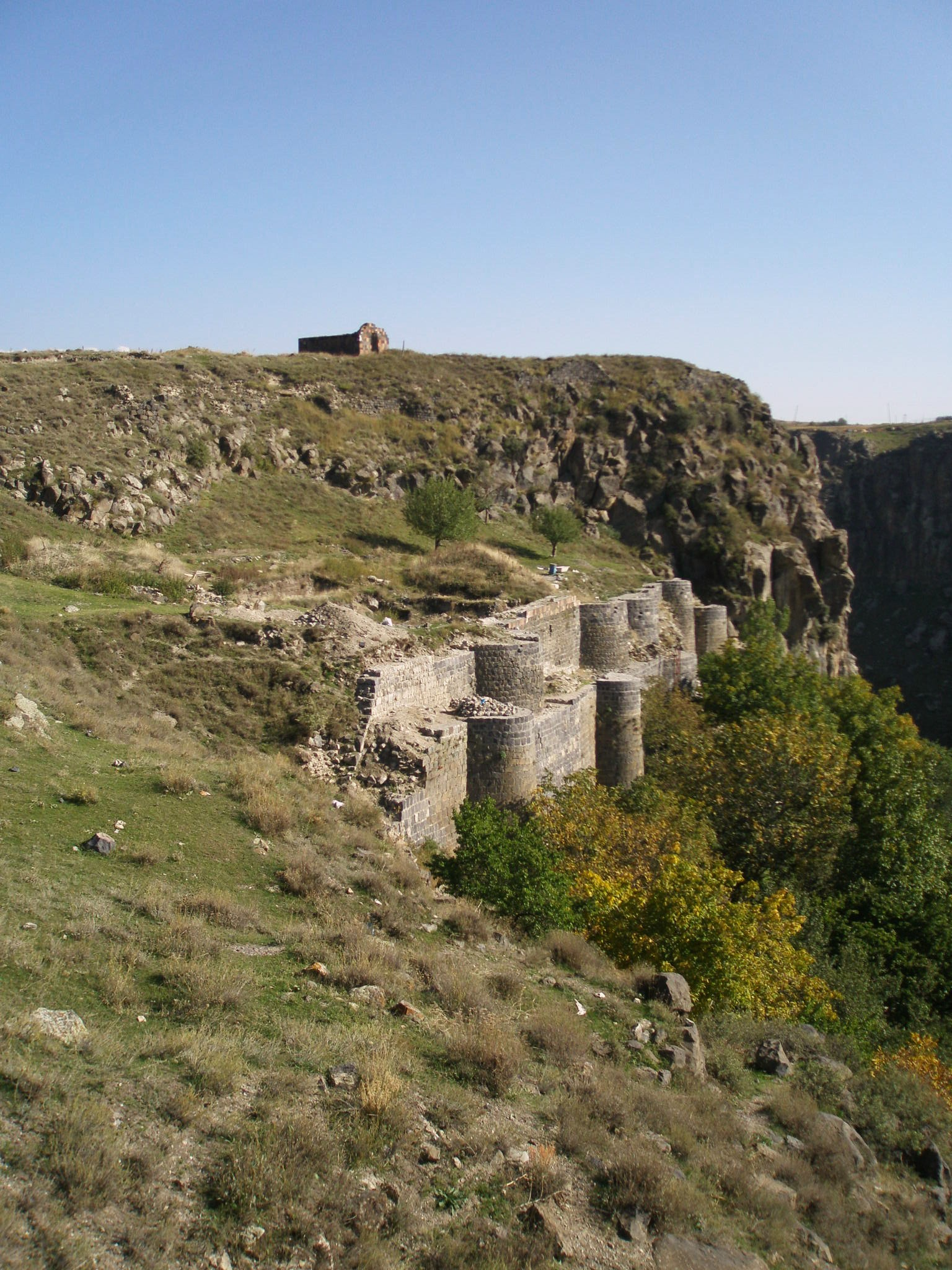
Remains of Bjni Fortress with a medieval structure being rebuilt upon the plateau.

Tsaytaghbyur in Bjni

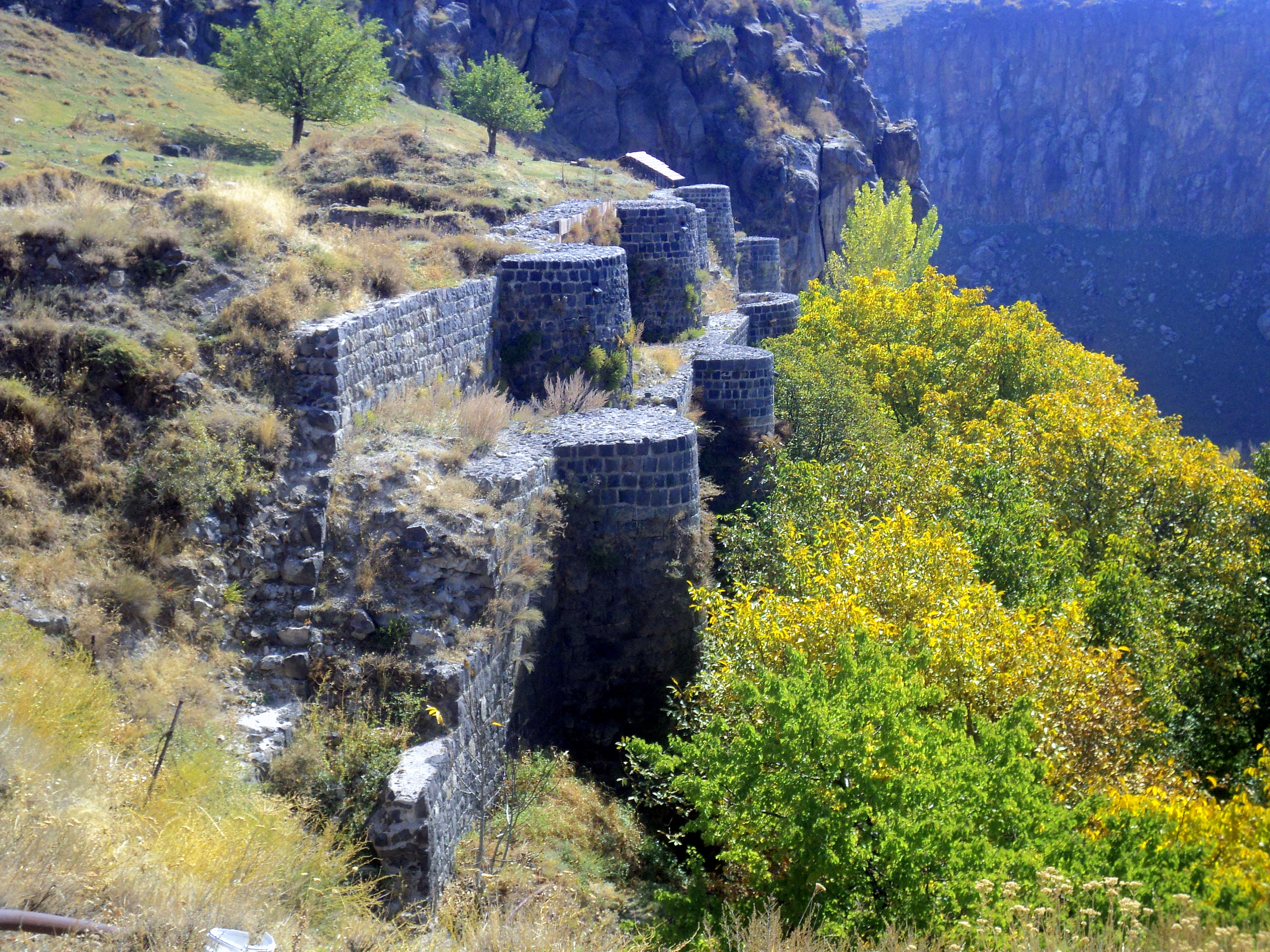
The remains of Bjini castle

== See also ==
- Kotayk Province
