= Arsharunik =

Coordinates: 40°25′54″N 43°31′01″E

Arsharunik was a historical district in Armenia, part of the province of Ayrarat, north of the river Araxes. Earlier in its history, the area was known as Eraskhadzor, and the important castle of Artagerk (Artageras of Strabo) was located there.
