= Stelter =

Stelter is a surname. Notable people with the surname include:

- Bernd Stelter (born 1961), German comedian and writer
- Brian Stelter (born 1985), American journalist
- Roland Stelter (born 1953), German author, visual artist, and designer

== See also ==
- Stetler
