= Lepsiushaus =

Coordinates: 52.4184°N 13.0637°E

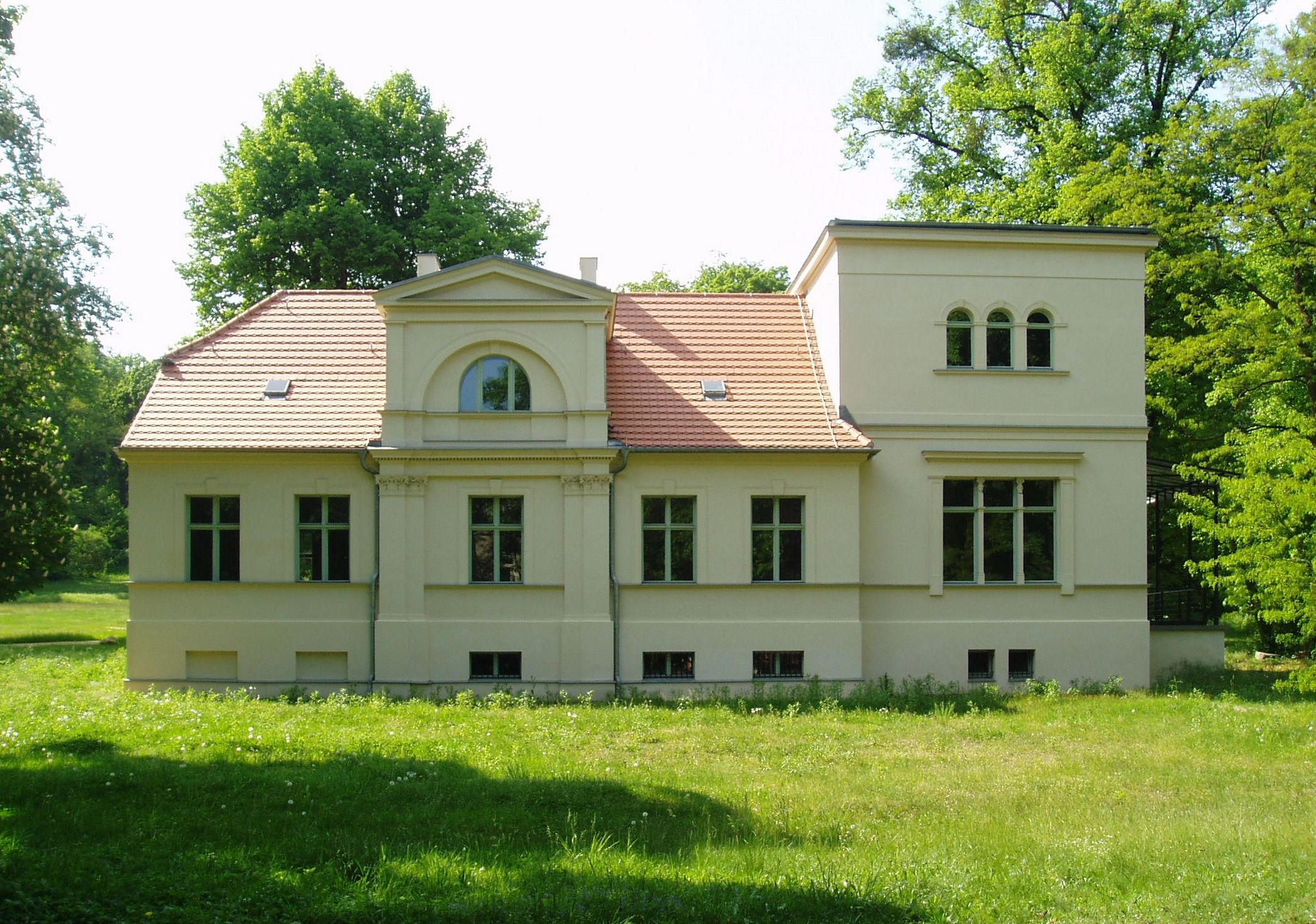
Lepsiushaus

Lepsiushaus is a house museum in Potsdam, Germany.

Johannes Lepsius was a German humanist, philosopher, historian, and Armenian human-rights activist. Lepsiushaus is the house where he lived from 1908 to 1926.

During the Cold War, this building in East Germany was abandoned. In 1998 the Ministry of Culture in Germany started the renovation of the building with the help of some private donations. The renovated Lepsiushaus was opened to the public as a "Research Center for Genocide Studies" in May 2011.

In 2015 the mayor of Potsdam, the minister of science, research and culture in Brandenburg, the Armenian ambassador to Germany, the representative of the Prussian Palaces and Gardens Foundation of Berlin-Brandenburg, and the publicist Rolf Hosfeld inaugurated in the park of the Lepsius Villa the marble sculpture «Civil Courage» by the sculptor Roland Stelter. The sculpture memorializes Johannes Lepsius, and "symbolizes the commitment to civil action against genocide and war crimes." (Jan Jacobs, mayor of Potsdam).

== Sources ==
- Official page
