= Johannes Lepsius =

German Protestant missionary (1858–1926)

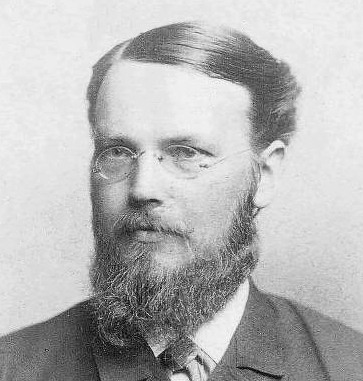
- Born: 15 December 1858; Potsdam, Kingdom of Prussia
- Died: 15 December 1926 (aged 68); Meran, Kingdom of Italy
- Occupations: Pastor, Missionary, Christian evangelist

Johannes Lepsius (15 December 1858 – 3 February 1926) was a German Protestant missionary, Orientalist, and humanist with a special interest in trying to prevent the Armenian genocide in the Ottoman Empire. He initially studied mathematics and philosophy in Munich and a PhD in 1880 with an already award-winning work. Lepsius was one of the founders and the first chairman of the German–Armenian Society.

During World War I he published his work "Bericht über die Lage des armenischen Volkes in der Türkei" ("Report on the situation of the Armenian People in Turkey") in which he meticulously documented and condemned the Armenian genocide. A second edition entitled "Der Todesgang des armenischen Volkes" ("The way to death of the Armenian people") included an interview with Enver Pasha, one of the chief architects of the genocide. Lepsius had to publish the report secretly because Turkey was an ally of the German Empire and the official military censorship soon forbade the publication because it feared that it would affront the strategically important Turkish ally. However Lepsius managed to distribute more than 20,000 copies of the report.

In his novel The Forty Days of Musa Dagh ("Die vierzig Tage des Musa Dagh") the Austrian-Jewish author Franz Werfel portrayed Lepsius as a "guardian angel of the Armenians". The intellectual heritage of Johannes Lepsius was collected by the German church historian Hermann Goltz, who installed the "Johannes Lepsius Archive" in Halle upon Saale with Martin Luther University of Halle-Wittenberg. Several documents and journals from the archive were published as microfiche.

== Family ==
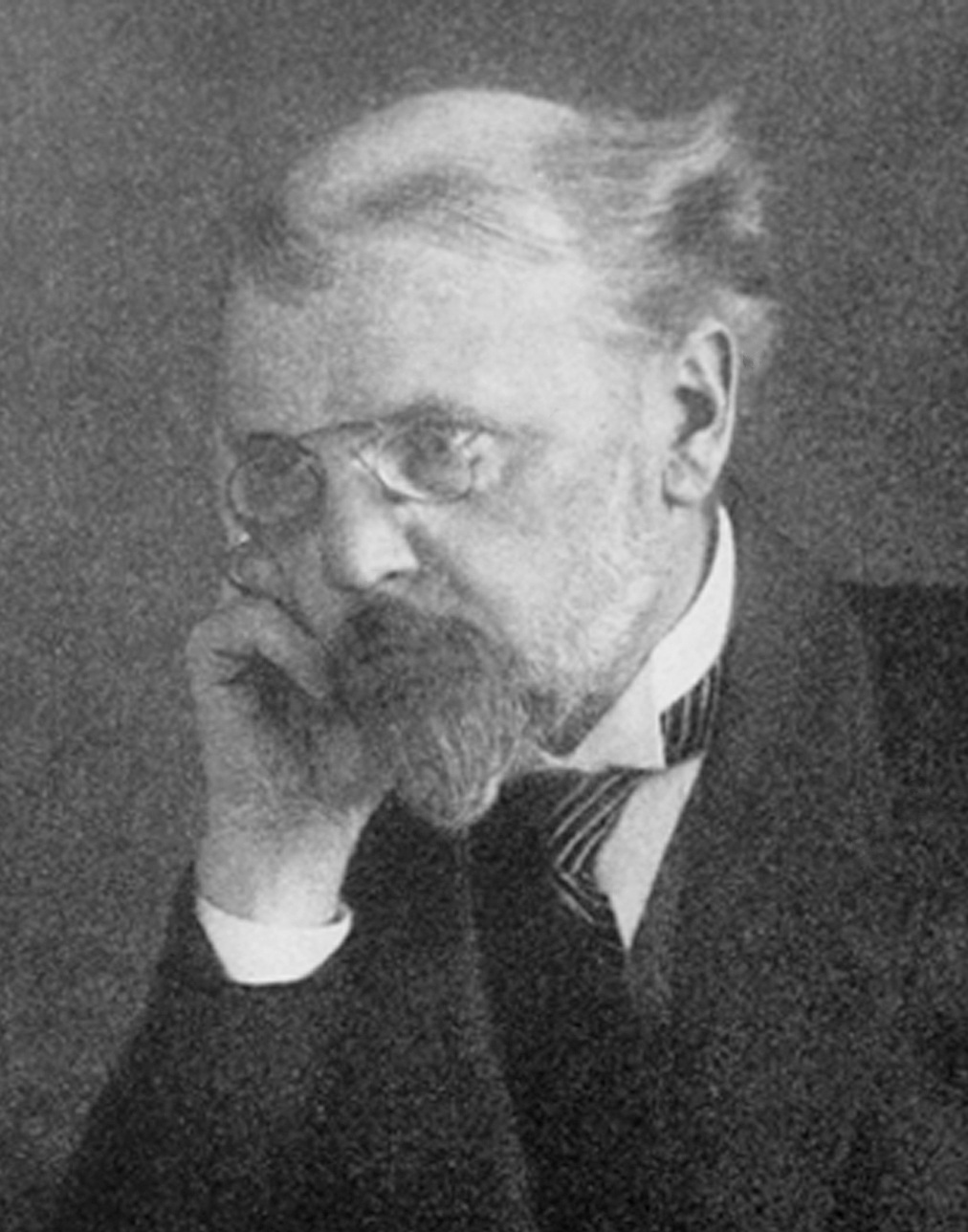
Johannes Lepsius

Johannes Lepsius was born in Potsdam, Kingdom of Prussia, the youngest son of the founder of Egyptology in Germany, the Egyptologist Carl Richard Lepsius and his wife Elisabeth Klein (1828–1899), a great-granddaughter of Friedrich Nicolai. Johannes' parents grew up in a house with a great intellectual horizon. In this house, Johannes met many important personalities of the empire, from politics to culture to religion. There were six siblings, including the geologist and Rector of the Technische Universität Darmstadt Richard Lepsius (1851–1915), the chemist and director of the Chemical Factory Griesheim Bernhard Lepsius (1854–1934) and the portrait painter and member of the Prussian Academy of Arts (as of 1916) Reinhold Lepsius (1857–1929).

His grandfather was the Naumburg County Commissioner Peter Carl Lepsius (1775–1853), his great-grandfather Johann August Lepsius (1745–1801) was Mayor of Naumburg upon Saale.

His wife was Margaret (Maggie) Zeller. She came from the internationally known missionary family, the Württembergian Zellers. Her father was Reverend Johannes Zeller (1830–1902), leader of the Gobat School (est. in 1847) in Jerusalem, directed by the Church Missionary Society since 1877. Through her mother Maggie Zeller was a granddaughter of Jerusalem's Bishop Samuel Gobat and a niece of Dora Rappard. Maggie and Lepsius met in Ottoman Jerusalem. Johannes, who was on the board of the Syrian Orphanage from 1884 to 1886, met many problems in Jerusalem due to massacres inflicted on the Christian population in 1860.

Johannes Lepsius house museum - Lepsiushaus was opened in 2011, Potsdam, Germany, in the house where Lepsius lived from 1908 to 1926. It is also a "Research Center for Genocide Studies".

== The Armenian genocide ==
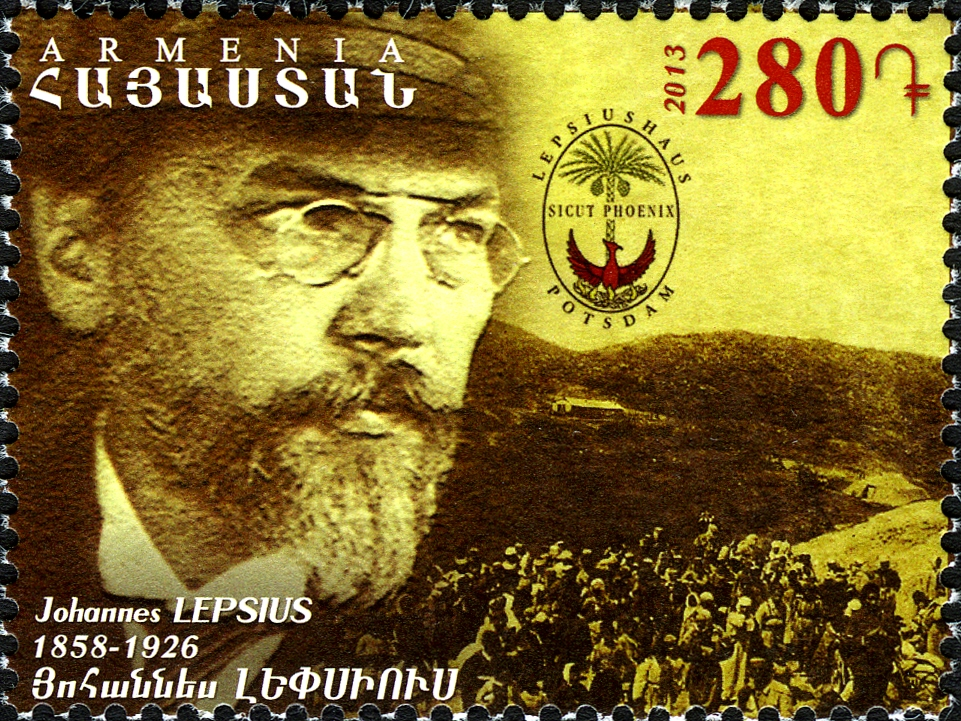
Johannes Lepsius on a 2013 Armenian stamp

Johannes Lepsius encouraged Josephina Zürcher to set up a clinic for the Armenians in Urfa in 1897.

In 1914, Lepsius, Paul Rohrbach and Avetik Isahakyan created the German–Armenian Society, with Lepsius becoming the first chairman. Lepsius campaigned for the plight of Armenians to such an extent that by January 1916, mere mention of his name excited a disturbance in the Reichstag and "Lepsius' very name had become a synecdoche for embarrassing information".

Lepsius is known for his documentation of the Armenian genocide. His work, "Report on the situation of the Armenian people in Turkey", was censored on 7 August 1916, however 20,000 copies were sent throughout Germany before the censorship was enforced. Another edition of the documentation is an interview with Enver Pasha in 1915 that bears the title "The death corridor of the Armenian people".

In 1909 the Armenians of the Ottoman Empire had high expectations from the Young Turk movement which brought Abdul Hamid's regime to an end. Yet during the opening months of the First World War, there were mass arrests, deportations, and massacres of Armenians living in Eastern Anatolia. During this time, Lepsius founded humanitarian relief activities, and tried (unsuccessfully) to influence Germany, the Ottoman Empire's ally, which had thousands of soldiers and officers stationed throughout the Ottoman Empire. According to Ernst Jaeckh "At the time of World War I he introduced the Armenian protagonist. Dr. Lepsius, to the Turkish Generalissimo Enver Pasha, and through the author's [Jaeckh's] intervention the lives of many Armenians, particularly women and children, were saved."

One of Lepsius' most important works is Germany and Armenia 1914–1918: Collection of Diplomatic documents, which later became considered as "the main document on the Armenian genocide." Later, in The Forty Days of Musa Dagh, Franz Werfel attributes two chapters to the description of Lepsius' struggle and his negotiations with Enver Pasha.<ref>"Franz Werfel, Les Quarante Jours du Musa Dagh, traduction de Paule Hofer-Bury, Albin Michel, 2015, p.159-198<ref>

== See also ==
- Witnesses and testimonies of the Armenian genocide
- German–Armenian Society
- Lepsiushaus

== Literature ==
- Troeger, Brigitte, Brennende Augen, Brunnen-Verlag, (2008), ISBN 3-7655-1904-9
- Edition of the Documents and Periodicals of the Johannes Lepsius Archive

It is made up of three parts – 1) Catalogue, 2) Microfiche edition, 3) Thematical lexicon

- Part 1: Katalog. Dokumente und Zeitschriften aus dem Dr. Johannes-Lepsius-Archiv – Zusammengestellt und bearbeitet von Hermann Goltz und Axel Meissner. – XXVIII, 622 Seiten – K. G. Saur Verlag München – ISBN 3-598-34407-4
- Part 2: Mikrofiche-Edition of the Documents and Periodicals of the Johannes Lepsius Archive. Bearb. von Hermann Goltz und Axel Meissner. Unter Mitarbeit von Ute Blaar and others. – 317 Silberfiches inkl. Begleitheft. Lesefaktor 24 X. – K. G. Saur Verlag München – ISBN 3-598-34408-2
- Part 3: Thematisches Lexikon zu Personen, Institutionen, Orten, Ereignissen – Zusammengestellt und verfasst von Hermann Goltz und Axel Meissner. XIII, 605 Seiten. – K. G. Saur Verlag München – ISBN 3-598-34409-0
