= Kenan Kolat =

Turkish-German politician (born 1959)

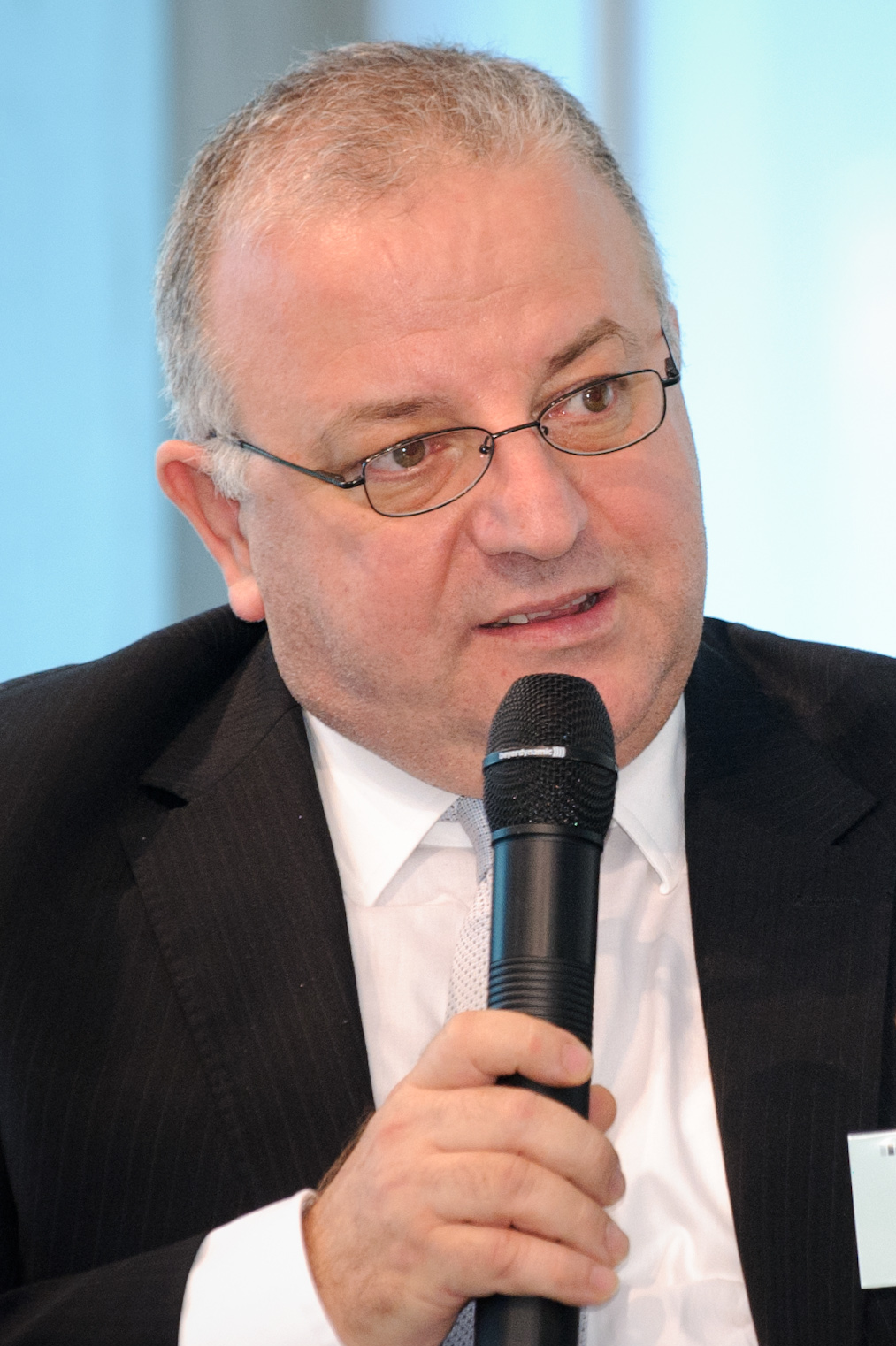
Kolat in 2011

Kenan Kolat (born August 24, 1959, in Istanbul) was the federal chairman of the Turkish Community in Germany e. V. (TGD) from 2005 to 2014. The Diplom-Ingenieur (Maritime Engineering (Marine Transport) holds German and Turkish citizenship. Kolat is a member of the SPD.

== Life ==
Kolat came to Berlin at the age of 21. He was married to Dilek Kalayci until 2017. Dilek Kolat became Senator for Labor, Integration, and Women of the State of Berlin in 2011. To avoid conflicts of interest after his wife became a senator, Kenan Kolat resigned from his position as paid managing director of the Turkish Federation in Berlin-Brandenburg at the end of 2011.

== Federal Chairman of the Turkish Community in Germany (TGD) ==
Kolat assumed the office of Federal Chairman of the TGD on October 22, 2005, succeeding Hakkı Keskin, and resigned on May 10, 2014, citing health reasons. On April 8, 2015, it was revealed that Kolat had been pressured by the Berlin state association not to run for re-election due to alleged financial irregularities. In March 2015, Kolat reported himself to the Berlin Public Prosecutor's Office, which subsequently initiated an investigation for breach of trust. The proceedings were discontinued in April 2015 due to minor culpability.

== Positions and statements ==
In early 2008, Kolat described the campaign style of the Hessian Minister-President Roland Koch as "political arson." Kolat expressed his "deep disappointment" with Chancellor Angela Merkel and the Federal Government Commissioner for Migration, Refugees and Integration Maria Böhmer, both of whom had sided with the Hessian CDU leader.

In a newspaper interview with the Berliner Zeitung on October 13, 2009, Kolat stated that, with regard to immigrants of Turkish origin in Germany, the term "participation" should be preferred over "integration." "Integration is understood by the majority as complete adaptation to the majority society and, in some respects, as assimilation. Participation, on the other hand, is taking part in all possible areas of life. Both sides are then called upon to participate," he continued, adding: "The native German population must also engage with the immigrants."

In addition to the German Integration Summit, Kolat also participated in the German Islam Conference, which was founded in 2006 by the then Minister of the Interior, Wolfgang Schäuble. The results of the Islam Conference 2011 chaired by Federal Minister Hans-Peter Friedrich were criticized by Kolat.

In 2009, Kolat criticized the inclusion of the topics of the Armenian Genocide and its denial in the Curriculum and textbooks of the state of Brandenburg, as well as a then-planned memorial for Johannes Lepsius, and announced a corresponding letter of complaint to Chancellor Merkel. He stated that these "historical events" had been "treated inadequately and one-sidedly so far," that the topic "endangered the inner peace" of Turkish students, and could put them under "psychological pressure." The Frankfurter Allgemeine Zeitung (FAZ) assessed Kolat's intervention as a "discriminatory attempt to disenfranchise Turkish students."

In July 2013, Kolat criticized the violent actions of the Erdoğan III cabinet against demonstrators during the 2013 protests in Turkey and called for a postponement of Turkey's accession negotiations with the European Union. Kolat described the behavior of Turkish Prime Minister Recep Tayyip Erdoğan during the protests against him as "fascist" and "arbitrary." He argued that Erdoğan's use of force to pursue his own interests was fascist.

Following the 2013 federal election, Kolat stated during a TGD meeting in Baden-Württemberg that dual citizenship was "the most important item on the TGD's agenda." "The SPD promised it to us. If the SPD breaks its promise a second time and disappoints voters of Turkish origin, the Turks will not forget it." In this context, he pointed out that 35% of the population in Germany under the age of six has a migration background.

"In twenty years, this proportion will be even higher. In some cities, it has already grown to over 75%. Germany must face this reality." These people will govern and lead Germany, Kolat emphasized.

== Awards ==
- 2013 "Estrongo Nachama Prize for Civil Courage and Tolerance" from the Berlin-based Meridian Foundation
