= German–Armenian Society =

The German–Armenian Society (Armenian: Գերմանահայկական Հասարակություն, Germanahaykakan Hasarakut’yun; German: Deutsch-Armenische Gesellschaft, DAG) is a German–Armenian association, which is active above all in the promotion of the mutual understanding between Germans and Armenians and the keeping of the interests of Armenians living in Germany. The society also supports the rights and interests of Armenian minorities in Turkey and other countries of the Near East.

== History ==
The German–Armenian Society was created 1914 by Johannes Lepsius, Paul Rohrbach and Avetik Isahakyan in Berlin. Lepsius was a first chairman of the association. The initiative for its establishment was the worsening situation of Armenians in the Ottoman Empire; one year later the Armenian genocide would begin. The society pursued the goal of independence and/or autonomy for the Armenian people. After the death of the later chairman Paul Rohrbach in 1956, the society was dissolved. In 1972 the society was revived in Frankfurt am Main. Today the society includes 274 members.

Since 1973 the association has published the quarterly magazine Armenisch-Deutsche Korrespondenz ("Armenian-German Correspondence"). The society has also published a number of books, including: 75 Years of the German-Armenian Society (Mainz, 1989), Phoenix From the Ashes: Armenia 80 Years After the Genocide (Frankfurt am Main, 1996), Armenia: History and Survival in a Difficult Environment (Frankfurt am Main, 1998), and Regarding Some Political and Legal Aspects of the Nagorno-Karabakh Problem (Frankfurt am Main, 1999).

The German–Armenian Society organizes various conferences and lectures and is member of the Association for the Study of Nationalities in the United States and the Institut für Auslandsbeziehungen in Stuttgart. The present chairman is Dr. Raffi Kantian.

== See also ==
Armenians in Germany
