= Statue of Avetik Isahakyan =

Statue of Avetik Isahakyan (Gyumri)
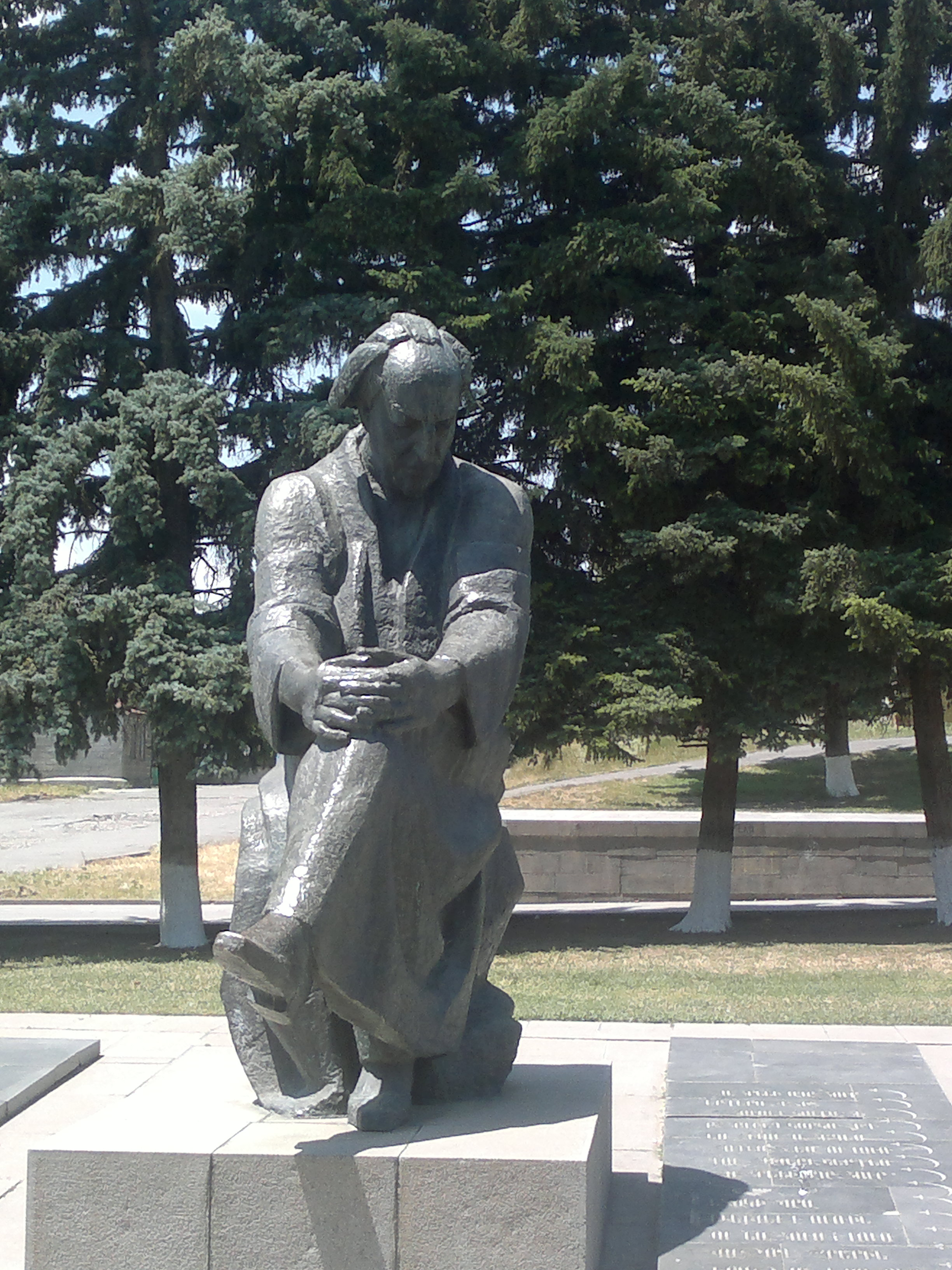
- Statue of Avetik Isahakyan (Gyumri)

- Location within Armenia
- 40°47′25″N 43°50′45″E
- Location: in front of the Gyumri theater in Gyumri, Armenia

History
- Built: 1975

Site notes
- Architect: Jim Torosyan
- Sculptor: Nikolay Nikoghosyan

Statue of Avetik Isahakyan (Armenian: Ավետիք Իսահակյանի հուշարձան) is a monumental statue. It is situated in front of the Gyumri theater in Gyumri theater square in Shirak Province, Armenia.

== History ==
The statue was built by sculptor Nikolay Nikoghosyan the memory of Avetik Isahakyan, a famous Armenian poet, writer, academician, member of the Armenian Academy of Sciences and a prominent public figure and was built in 1988.

== Description ==
The monument is situated in front of the Gyumri theater in Gyumri theater square in Shirak Province, Armenia. It is mainly made of bronze. Another statue of Avetiq Isahakyan can be found in the Circular Park in Yerevan.

== Gallery ==
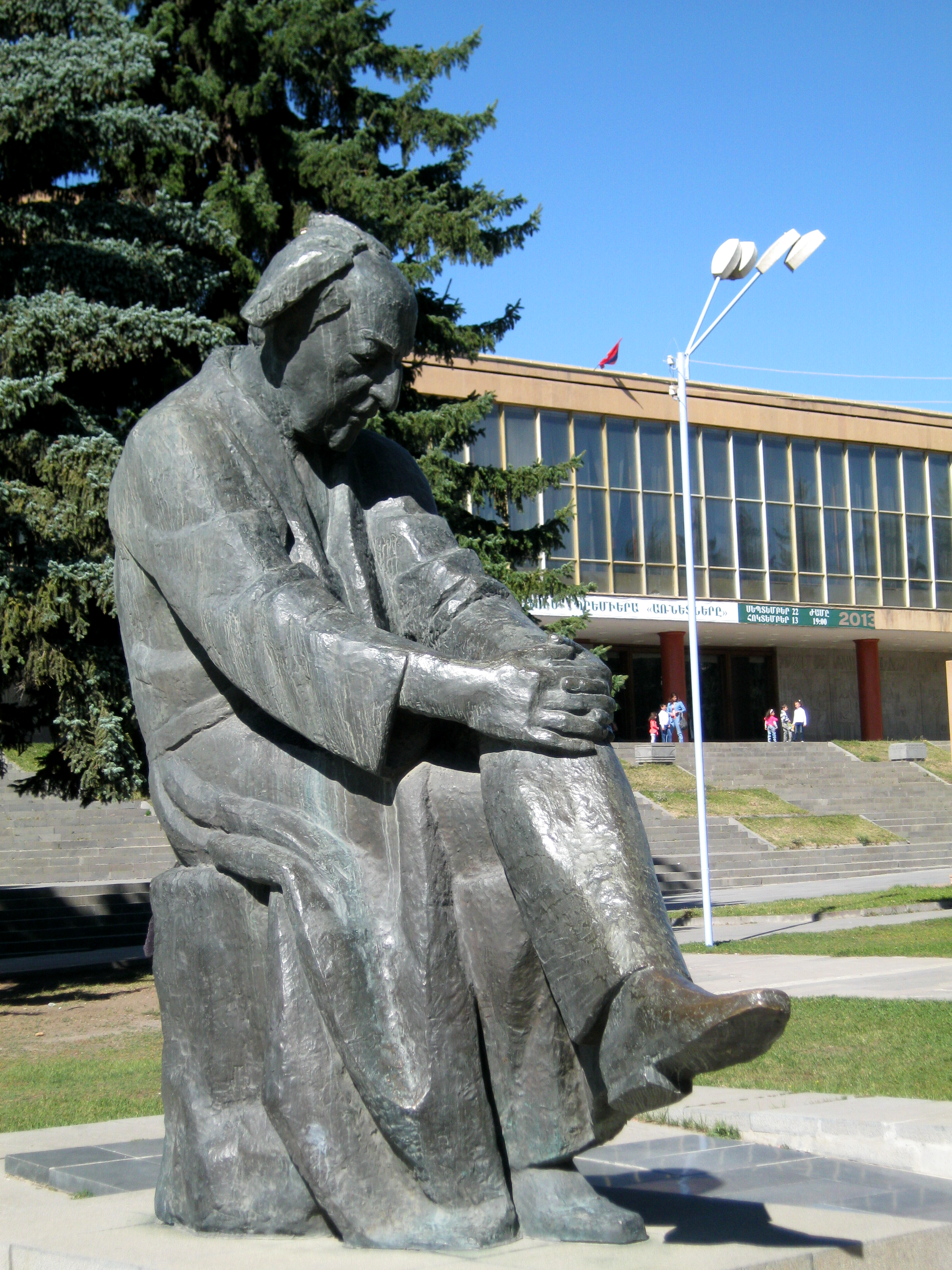

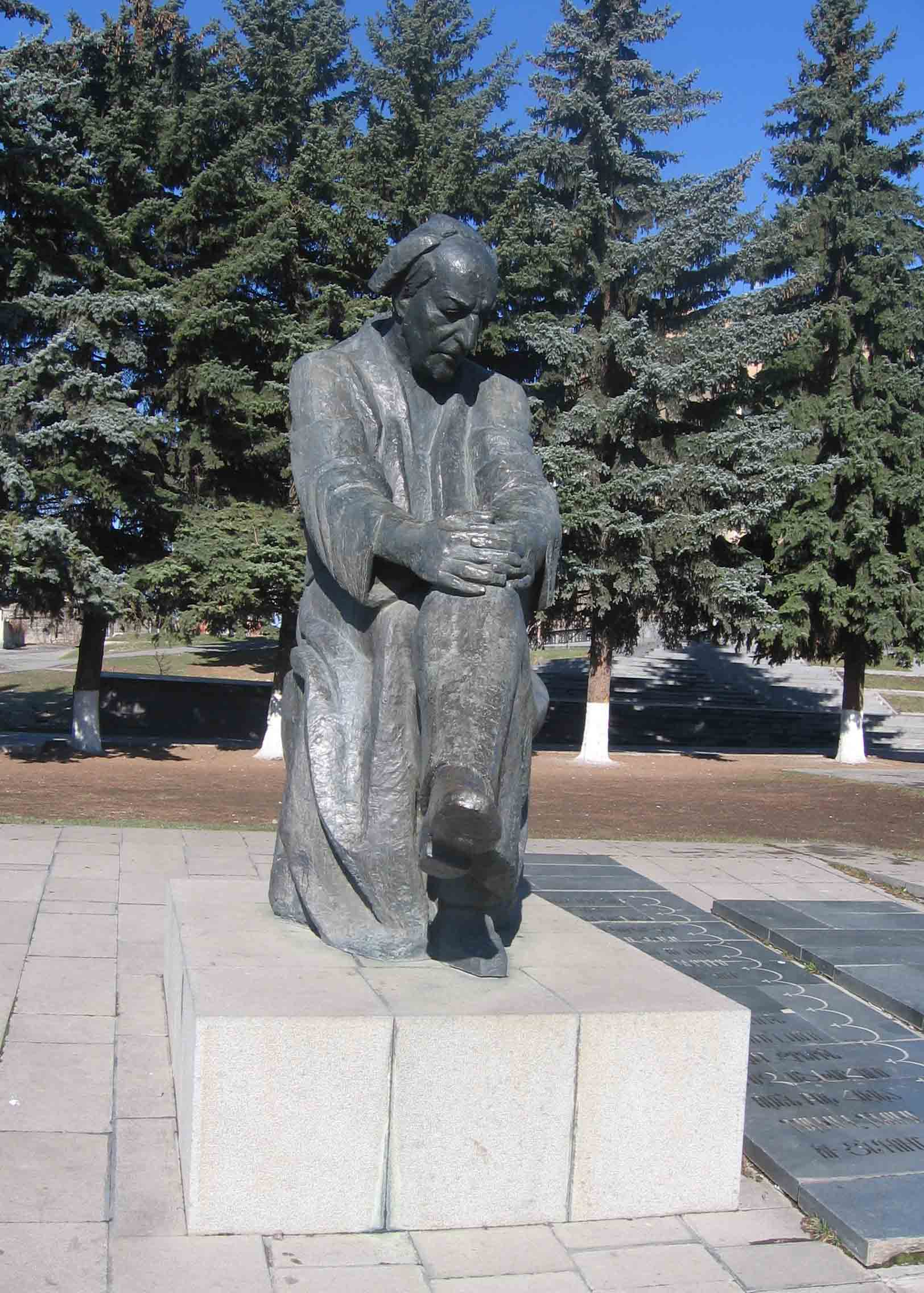
