= Roland Stelter =

German author, artist and designer

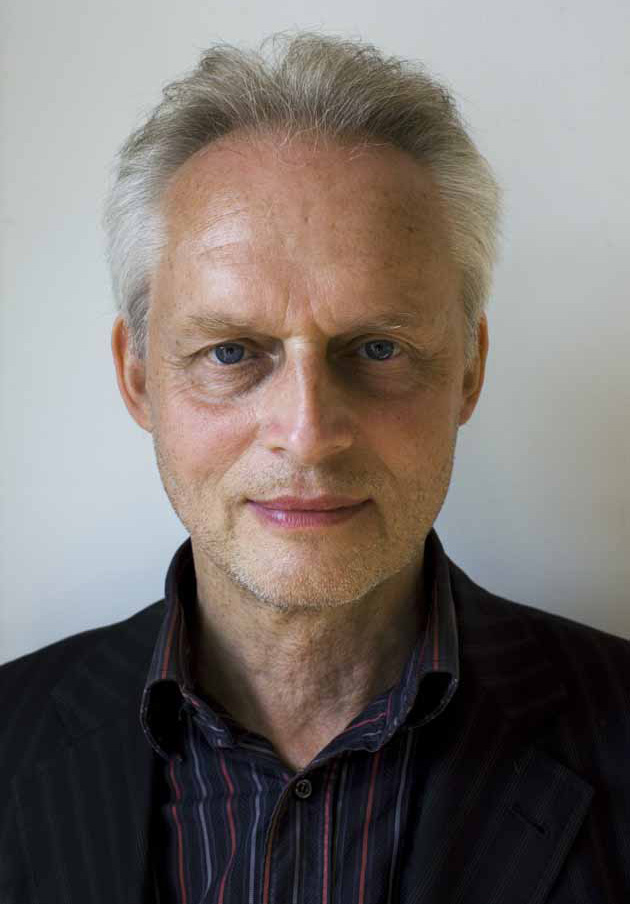
Roland Stelter 2013

Roland Stelter (born in Berlin in 1953) is a German author, visual artist and designer.

== Education ==
Stelter grew up in the Wedding area of Berlin. His mother was a seamstress and his father owned a small corner store. He attended the Diesterweg Gymnasium where he studied art and design under Horst Henschel. He then studied sociology under Professor Urs Jaeggi at the Free University of Berlin, earning a master's degree. At the Berlin University of the Arts in Berlin in the 1980s, he studied life drawing under Professor Peter Müller. Stelter has also worked as a newspaper boy, a packer, a gardener, a house painter and as a labourer in the metal and construction industries. Since the 1970s he managed cultural exchange projects. He also worked as an academic tutor for Professor Wolfgang Fritz Haug at the Free University Berlin.

== Cultural and political activities ==
In the 1980s Stelter wrote for the arts sections of Berlin newspapers such as Berliner Extradienst, Die Neue and die Tageszeitung. He was CEO and editor-in-chief of the cultural journal omnibus published by the Akademie der Künste in Berlin, the Hochschule der Künste, the Deutsche Oper Berlin, the Berliner Schaubühne, the Freunde der Deutschen Kinemathek and other major West Berlin cultural institutions. In the 1990s Stelter worked as a designer, content manager and copywriter for advertising agencies. In the late 1990s he was head of public relations for Germany's largest city planner at that time, the development agency Bornstedter Feld. Stelter co-founded the Galerie Augustus in the Mitte area of Berlin in beginning of the 1990s. The gallery exhibited the works of artists such as Kerstin Grimm, Melanie Manchot, Martin Parr, Eva Rubinstein, Ransome Stanley and Emilio Vedova. Stelter also participated in the launch and organisation of many other cultural and political projects while continuing to work as an author, journalist, painter, sculptor and photographer. In 1983 he co-founded the 'Aktives Museum Faschismus und Widerstand in Berlin', serving together with Heinz Schilling as deputy chairman of the board of executives under Gerhard Schoenberner. He was one of the founders of the major project "1933–1983". The project was the first to bring together all of West Berlin's democratically oriented political groups for a critical re-evaluation of the Nazi period in Germany. After the fall of the Berlin Wall in 1993, he launched the major project 'Upheaval – Chaos and Hope' ('Umbruch – Chaos und Hoffnung') with the support of the Senate of Berlin and the Treuhand, among others. His experiences with the "new Europe" were the inspiration of his international exhibition project 'My Europe' ('Mein Europa'), ongoing since the year 2000.

=== Reception ===
June Carolyn Erlick wrote about the project Umbruch – Chaos und Hoffnung in the New York magazine ARTnews in October 1993:

The innovative exhibition "Upheaval – Chaos and Hope" also underlined Berlin's provocative role as a stage for art, reminding visitors of the country's Communist and Nazi past. It set out to expose layers of Germany's recent history with a three-building show.

Ulrich Roloff-Momin, Senator for Cultural Affairs Berlin, in the preface to the catalog "Umbruch – Chaos und Hoffnung" ("Upheaval – Chaos and Hope" [transl.]). Berlin 1993:

It is not enough to wait for better times. Anyone who wants more than just the incorporation of East Berlin into West Berlin has to take action. With artworks and an exhibition, the project "Umbruch – Chaos und Hoffnung" ("Upheaval – Chaos and Hope" [transl.]) provides the opportunity to reflect on a period of German history at a location which epitomizes Berlin.

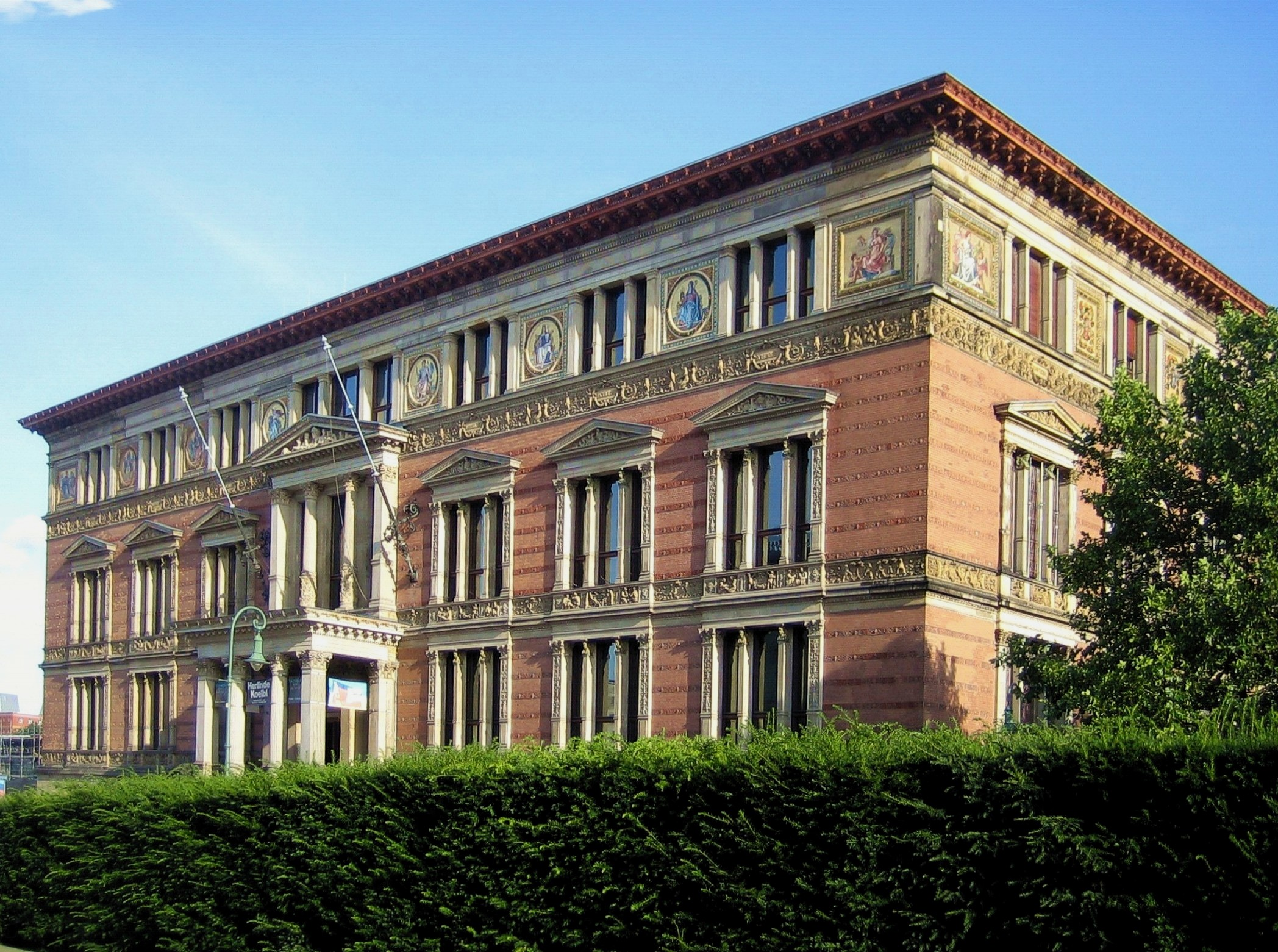
Martin-Gropius-Bau, from north west

Karen E. Till‚ The New Berlin. Memory, Politics, Place. University of Minnesota Press. Minneapolis 2005:

At a public hearing sponsored by the Academy of Arts about the future of the Martin Gropius Bau in 1983, Roland Stelter recalled standing in front of the rubble of the former Gestapo building after the war as a child. Only later did he find out what had actually happened in that building. He stated that, one cannot so easily, when one speaks about a Museum of German History, move away [from the reality of] where this Gropius-Bau stands: namely, right next to the prison cells where witnesses were persecuted during this time, many of whom are still living.

== Work as a visual artist ==
Roland Stelter has worked primarily as an author, painter, sculptor and photographer since the 1990s. His painting, drawing and sculpture are strongly influenced by post-war abstract modernism. Stelter met Emilia Vedova in the early 1990s. He and Vedova both participated in group exhibitions in the Galerie Augustus in Berlin and the Yavneh Art Workshop Gallery in Israel. Stelter's photography strictly follows the principles of classical composition. He typically uses only natural light and avoids effects. Stelter's work has been included in numerous exhibitions in Germany and around the world. He collaborated with Lutz Dölle on the prize-winning, large-scale sculpture 'Fragment des Regens' ('Fragment of Rain'). He collaborated with a biotechnology company in 1999 to create an exhibit on genetic engineering that included paintings, large-scale photographs and a video installation. His photography and text exhibition 'Ms Zhuk and her granddaughter' ('Frau Zhuk und ihre Enkelin') was shown in the 'Topography of Terror – documentation center forced labor memorial' in Berlin ('Topographie des Terrors – Dokumentationszentrum NS-Zwangsarbeit') from fall of 2010 until summer of 2011. The exhibition was about the life of Ms Zhuk, a Ukrainian survivor of Nazi forced labour and concentration camps who was persecuted by the KGB after her return. Large-scale sculptures by Stelter stand in the American Academy of Berlin's private park and in the city centre of Osnabrück.

Following his wish, to show political responsibility as an artist, he carried out the photo exhibition «Memories of Europe« in the Chernigov Art Museum M. Galagan in Ukraine in 2014.

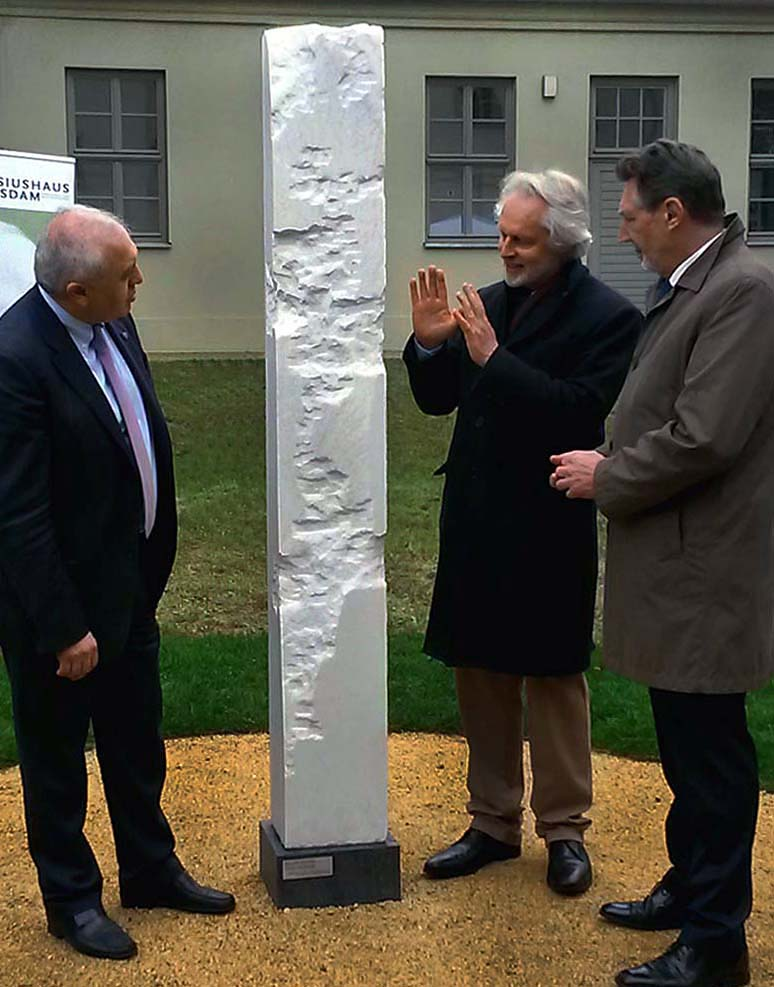
Achot Sempadian, Armenian ambassador to Germany, Roland Stelter, artist and Jann Jakobs, mayor of Potsdam at the inauguration of Stelter's sculpture "Civil Courage", in 2015 in Potsdam (from left to right)

In 2015 the mayor of Potsdam, the minister of science, research and culture in Brandenburg, the Armenian ambassador to Germany, the representative of the Prussian Palaces and Gardens Foundation of Berlin-Brandenburg, and the publicist Rolf Hosfeld inaugurated Roland Stelter's marble sculpture "Civil Courage." The sculpture memorializes Johannes Lepsius, and "symbolizes the commitment to civil action against genocide and war crimes." (Jan Jacobs, mayor of Potsdam). It was placed in the park of the Lepsius Villa in Potsdam, in the former military zone No. 7 where the KGB was based in the GDR, now the home of the Prussian Palaces and Gardens Foundation of Berlin-Brandenburg. The location is also within a UNESCO world heritage site including a former KGB prison, the Neuer Garten park with the castle Cecilienhof where the Potsdam Conference was held in August 1945, the Belvedere of Sanssouci castle, and the Villa Henkel.

=== Reception ===
The artery magazine about Roland Stelter's paintings and sculptures: [Gemälde und Steinskulpturen von Roland Stelter" ("Painting and stone sculptures by Roland Stelter" [transl.]), in artery June 1994]

His work gives the impression of being influenced by American Abstract Expressionism, a distinct classical aesthetic language in conjunction with a most subjective psychological expression. Nonetheless Stelter's work captures a specific physical presence.

Peter Herbstreuth wrote in the Berlin newspaper Der Tagesspiegel [in: Der Tagesspiegel on 4 July 1994]:

Roland Stelter ... works with marble blocks and blue stone, bringing both materials into a fragile balance. Constructive forms are inspired by the concept that the stone figures have to lose their weight and float in front of your eyes.

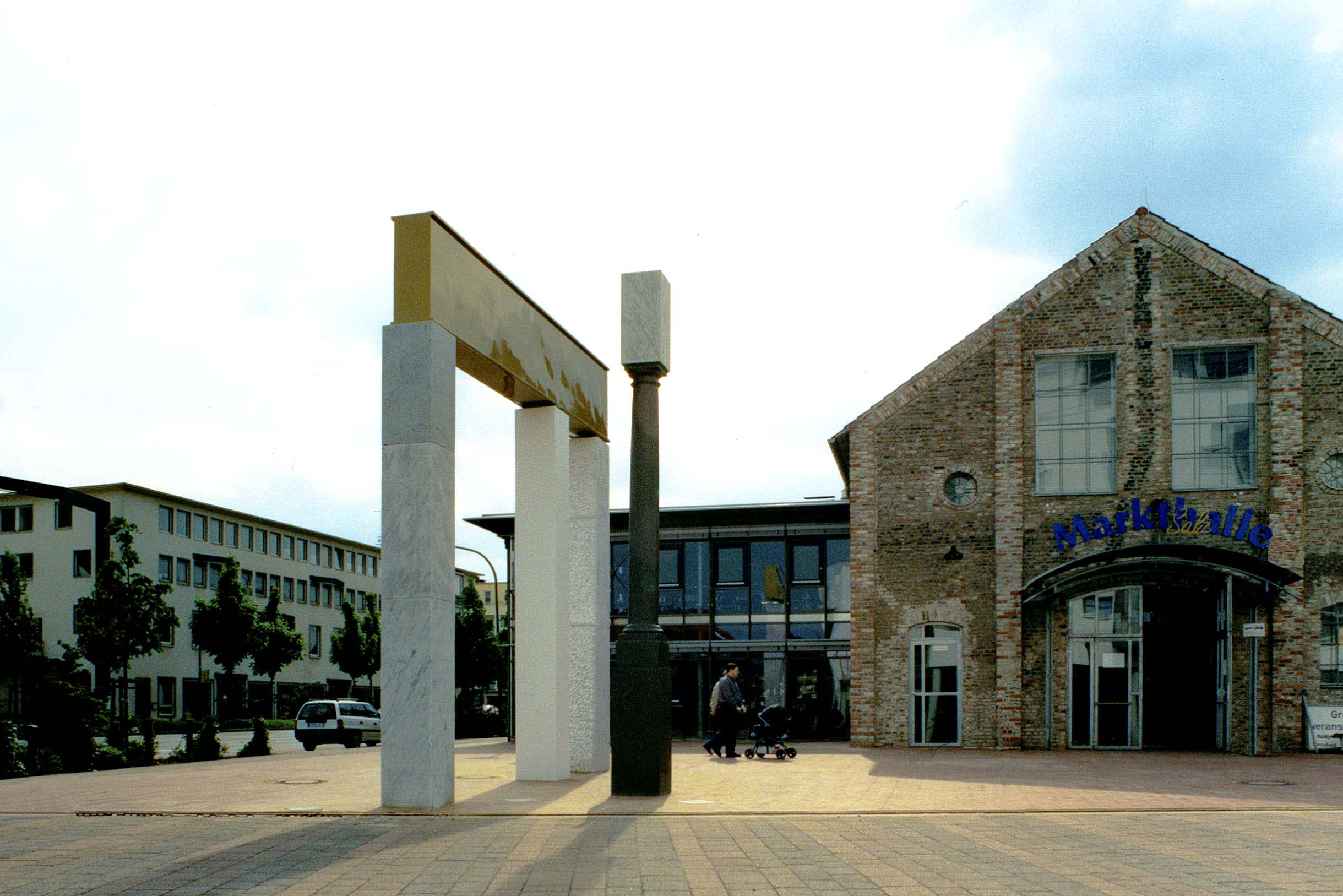
Fragment des Regens (1999)

Tom Bullman in the Neue Osnabrücker Zeitung on the public sculpture 'Fragment des Regens' ('Fragment of Rain' [transl.])., May 8, 1999:

The inner link of antiquity and modernity, the confrontation of nature and high-tech as well as the adjustment to the historical preconditions of the location are all captured by this sculpture.

Simone Reber in the radio transmission "Galerie Rundgang" for Radio Kultur of SFB and ORB about the photo exhibition "Mythos Moscow" by Roland Stelter in the Gallery Blickensdorf Berlin, April 24, 2001:

The most beautiful are the photos of a hotel room with a wine-red velvet blanket on top of the bed and an art deco lamp, as if time has stopped. Roland Stelter makes prints himself in which the colors turn out very soft, very cosy, very close to painting.

Klaus Jörg Schönmetzler, Rosenheim's cultural attaché, said in a speech at the Galerie's Christmas exhibition of the 'Gallery of the Kunst und Kultur zu Hohenaschau e.V.' in 2008:

In his case I am somewhat in favor of talking of a murderous aesthetics. For what he creates are pictures which almost always tell of something else than what they show on the first look.

Julia Brodauf. 'Frau Zhuk und ihre Enkelin' ('Ms. Zhuk and her granddaughter' [transl.]), in: magazine 'Junge Kunst', Nr. 86, June 2011:

A series of quiet portraits was created ... of women, landscapes and cities. Summery pictures, flooded with light, almost casual in their expression, revealing past and present pain only on a second or third view ... Roland Stelter has selected a visual language which is documentary but not journalistic ... The work fits well into his entire oeuvre of different art media ..., which was shaped and is shaped to a high extent by abstract form. Psychological elements like strong facial expressions or gestures he leaves in the background; instead he relies on a stringently worked out composition, and he relies on a lyrical interpretation of the half hidden.

Bogdan Gulyay in the Ukrainian internet magazine „Gorod.cn.ua – Portal Tschernigova (Portal Çernigova)" at August 10, 2014 about the Open Air – Vernissage of the exhibition «Memories of Europe« by Roland Stelter of the Art Museum Chernigov M. Galagan, Ukraine:

An exhibition of the well-known photographer from Germany here in our place, in Chernigov on the "Green Stage"! – I was thinking when I crossed the Red Square. How, by any chance, did he come here to this withdrawn place – forgotten by the Gods. I was even more surprised, when I saw the landscapes, interiors, and people from Germany, France, Poland, Ukraine, Belarus, and Russia some minutes later.

Krikor Amirzayan wrote: "On April 28, 2015, in the heart of the Johannes Lepsius house museum in Potsdam (Germany), the inauguration of a work by the German sculptor Roland Stelter was held ... A number of prominent figures attended the inaugural ceremony. Among them were the mayor of Potsdam Jan Jacobs, the director of the Johannes Lepsius museum Rolf Hosfeld and the Armenian ambassador to Germany Achot Sempadian." The Focus magazine wrote: "A new monument in Potsdam memorializes the theologian Johannes Lepsius ... The German minister Sabine Kunst (SPD) reminded the audience that civil courage begins with the individual ... The German government at the time partially enabled these deportations and massacres by tolerating them and looking the other way."

The mayor of Potsdam Jan Jacobs in his address at the inauguration of the sculpture "Civil Courage":

The marble sculpture "Civil Courage" by Roland Stelter symbolizes the commitment to civil action against genocide and war crimes exemplified by Johannes Lepsius ... Carrara marble from the famous Italian region Massa-Carrara was used for this sculpture not, as so often, for figurative purposes. Instead the material was used here as a design element in itself. The material effectively symbolizes the concept of civil courage, which are acts of individual bravery necessary to safeguard our freedom ... Traditionally in sculpture, a marble monument also symbolizes the immortality of the visual arts. Here in particular the marble serves as a lasting reminder of the extraordinary civil commitment of a single individual for an entire people – a commitment that should never be forgotten. A universal theme here powerfully evoked by a critically astute artistic act.

Isabel Fannrich-Lautenschläger:

The white marble stone has a "broken character" – partially polished smooth, partially hatched and almost scaled using a hammer and hook ... In the middle of the war Lepsius travelled to Istanbul, and in 1916 defied his government by writing his "Report on the condition of the Armenian people in Turkey". The military censor reacted by suppressing the report. Lepsius quickly self-published 20,500 copies of the report. Because he of the ban on publication, he was forced to live in exile in Holland until the end of the war. "For a father of twelve, the situation was extremely risky for himself and his family," reminded Hosfeld. "I believe Roland Stelter's monument is extraordinary because it reflects the scars that life leaves on us all, no matter how virtuous we are."

Stephan Laude:

At the inauguration, Stelter said that the inspiration for his work is always political. He purposely avoided a figurative approach ... The monument is a reminder. But it also points to the future said Rolf Hosfeld, Lepsius House's academic director ... Potsdam's mayor, Jann Jakobs (SPD), said that ... the monument reaffirms the Lepsius House as a vital site for reflection, discussion and debate.

== Literary work ==
Besides publishing cultural and political articles and essays, Stelter has also written short stories. In 2005 Rotbuch Verlag published his debut novel, Leons Bruder, set during the turbulent times following the end of the Cold War. In recent years he has been working on a second novel about the consequences of the upheaval in the 1990s, particularly for the future. He has participated in the Berlin International Literature Festival, such as when he gave a reading from his novel Leons Bruder or when he took part in the 24-hour global live online reading Authors for Peace on September 21, 2010, the United Nations 'International Day of Peace'.

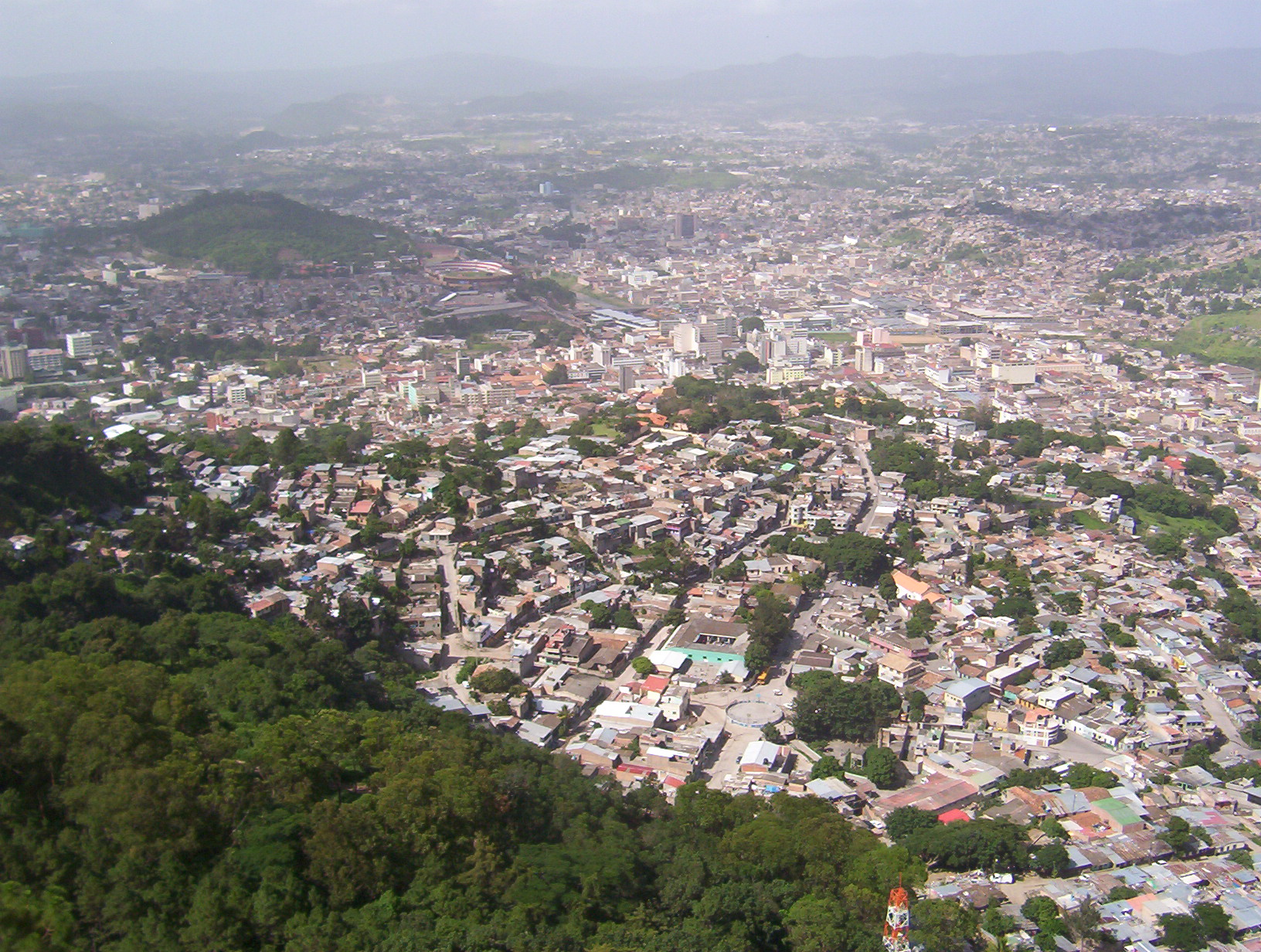
Tegucigalpa, Honduras, one of the places of Stelters novel

=== Reception ===
Tanja Hellwig writes in her article "Sex und Politik im Kalten Krieg" ("Sex and Politics in the Cold War") about the novel Leons Bruder, in: Südkurier, June, 28th, 2005:

A breathless story that discusses the process of writing as it illuminates the connection between the private and the political. Stelter manages to successfully fuse these levels.

Hanno Depner in the catalogue of the 5th International Literature Festival, Berlin 2005:

Leons Bruder: Roman einer Zeitenwende (2005) tells the life story of a restless artist traveling between America, Germany, France, and Russia, and so sketches a complex historical panorama of the second half of the 20th Century.

== Work as a designer and lecturer ==
Besides working as an author, visual artist and designer, Stelter has also served periodically since 2010 as an adjunct professor of photography, design and professional writing at Webster University Vienna and in Amsterdam/Leiden. Together with his son Julian Stelter he ran the agency and international platform 'forum bmp – communication design art in international partnership' (2010–2016). In a nature reserve in the north-eastern part of Germany he restored in cooperation with his son Benjamin Stelter an ensemble of listed buildings from 18th and 19th century and designed it for the purpose of modern living and working.

Stelter has lived for extended periods in the United States, France and Russia. He has two grown sons from his first marriage. He currently lives in Berlin.

== Works ==
=== Exhibitions (selection) ===
- Commerzbank, Berlin: Sales of paintings for interior decoration to Commerzbank, Berlin, 1991
- Gallery Augustus Berlin: Exhibition of drawings, paintings, and sculptures, 1992
- Yavneh Art Workshop Gallery, Israel: Participation in a group exhibition with Richard Long, Emilio Vedova, Tom Wesselmann, et al., 1993
- Gallery Augustus Berlin: Participation in a group exhibition with drawings, paintings, and sculptures, 1995
- Gallery in Samambaia, Paris: Exhibition "Dessins Paris-Berlin", 1996
- Métissage Festival, Paris: Exhibition of bronze sculptures, 1996
- Goethe Institute, Paris: Artist's web site portrait of Roland Stelter, 1998
- Exhibition hall co.don AG, Brandenburg: Art project B-E-I-N-G featuring the theme, 'Human identity and biotechnology'. Works included large-scale photography, paintings, an electronic installation and texts. In cooperation with the biotechnological company 'co.don AG'. Supported by Deutsche Bank AG. Inaugurated by the Prime Minister of Brandenburg, Manfred Stolpe, 1999
- Museum Dominikaner Kloster Osnabrück, Germany: Presentation of photos, paintings, and sculptures, in cooperation with the Gallery Blickensdorff Berlin, 1999
- Museum St. Marienkirche, Frankfurt/Oder, Germany: Participation in the exhibition 'BauArt' ('ArchitectureArt'), 1999
- Gallery Blickensdorff Berlin: Exhibition 'Mythos Moskau' ('Mythos Moscow'), 2001
- International photography festival 'About Visions', Nishnij Novgorod, Russia: Invitation to the international photography festival by the city of Nishnij Novgorod, Russia. With the support of the city and of the Goethe Institute, Moscow, 2002
- Gallery OGI–Lisa Plavinskaja, Moscow: Exhibition 'Mythos.City.Europe', 2002
- Geschichtswerkstatt, Minsk, Belarus: "My Europe" photography exhibition of and lecture at the 'Geschichtswerkstatt Minsk' supported also by the Association for International Education and Exchange (IBB) of the German state of North Rhine-Westphalia, the Goethe Institutes of Minsk and Moscow, and the Embassy of the Federal Republic of Germany in Belarus as part of "Kulturmomente 2007", 2007
- Museum in the castle Hartmannsberg/Germany: Exhibition of the photography and text artwork 'Die Würde des Menschen ist unantastbar' in an exhibition of contemporary art inspired by the German constitution, 2008
- Gallery 'Kunst und Kultur zu Hohenaschau e.V.', Aschau/Chiemgau, Germany: Participation in the group exhibition with the photography exhibition ‚Between La Sarthe and Volga River', 2009
- Serendipity Gallery, Kunsthaus Acud Berlin, 'Artwork of 20 Years 1991–2011', 2011
- Memorial Museum "Gedenkstätte NS-Zwangsarbeit Berlin-Schöneweide": Photography exhibition 'Ms. Zhuk and her granddaughter', 2010/11
- The May Gallery, Webster University, St. Louis, USA: Participation in the Photography Faculty Show, 2012
- Art Museum Chernigov M. Galagan, Ukraine: Photo Exhibition Memories of Europe, 2014

=== Public sculpture ===
- 1999 – Fragment of Rain/Fragment des Regens (Osnabrück, Germany)
- 2001 – City of Heroes (Heldenstadt) (Parc of the American Academy in Berlin)
- 2015 − Zivilcourage (Lepsius-Haus, Potsdam)

=== Publications ===
- Various articles on cultural politics and short stories in the newspapers Berliner Extradienst, Die Neue and Die Tageszeitung. 1973–1988
- Various articles in the Berlin cultural magazine omnibus. Eds.: Akademie der Künste Berlin, Hochschule der Künste, Deutsche Oper Berlin, Berliner Schaubühne, Freunde der Deutschen Kinemathek et al. 1973–1988
- Co-author of the catalog for the cultural and political project "1933–1983". Berlin 1983
- Co-author of the brochure for the "Topographie des Terrors" ("Topography of Terror" [transl.]) of the Aktives Museums Faschismus und Widerstand in Berlin e.V., Berlin 1984
- Essay in cultural politics in: Anja Dau und Roland Stelter (Eds.). "Umbruch – Chaos und Hoffnung" ("Upheaval – Chaos and Hope" [transl.]). Berlin 1993. (As part of the project of the same name; in cooperation with Treuhandanstalt Deutschland, the Berlin Senator for Cultural Affairs and the Gesellschaft Hackesche Höfe Berlin.)
- Essay "Der Künstler. Die Kunst." ("The Artist. The Art." [transl.]) in: "Roland Stelter. Gemälde Skulpturen Zeichnungen" ("Painting Sculptures Drawings" [transl.]) . Berlin 1996
- Essay and poem "B-E-I-N-G", in: "B-E-I-N-G". co.don+ART. Berlin 1998
- Essay "Ransome Stanleys Werk" ("Ransome Stanley's Creation" [transl.]), in: "Ransome Stanley". München. 1998
- Essay "Felix Müller ist ein Künstler" ("Felix Müller is an artist" [transl.]) in: "Felix Müller". Galerie Völcker und Freunde. Berlin. 2000
- Novel "Leons Bruder"("Leon's brother"). Rotbuch Verlag/Europäische Verlagsanstalt. Hamburg. 2005

• Essay "Ein Stil entsteht – Felix Müller" ("A Style Develops – Felix Müller" [transl.]), in: Felix Müller. Arbeiten/Works//2002-2006. Berlin 2006

- Essay "Kunst ist kein Comic – alle Kunst ist abstrakt" ("Art is not a comic – all art is abstract" [transl.]), in "Ransome Stanley. Abb. 2002–2007". München. 2007
- Online publication."11 Countries – Photos Literature Sculptures of Cities and Landscapes from East and West at the Beginning of the 21st Century." Berlin 2007
- Essay "Ein Europa der zwei Europa – Deutschland und Belarus im Blick des Künstlers und Schriftstellers Roland Stelter" ("One Europe of two Europes – Germany and Belarus viewed by the artist and writer Roland Stelter" [transl. from Russian]) in the catalog of the photo exhibition, Geschichtswerkstatt Minsk (Ed.). 2007
- Essay "Kolyma – Ort verlorener Zeit" ("Kolyma – A Place of Lost Time") in: "Sarah Schoenfeld". Galerie Kunstagenten. Berlin 2008.
