= Armenians in Germany =

- Distribution of Armenian citizens in Germany (2021)

Total population
- 80,000 – 100,000

Regions with significant populations
- North Rhine-Westphalia, between the cities of Cologne and Düsseldorf, Hesse (here majority of Armenians living in Frankfurt) and Hamburg, Sufficiently strong Armenian community in Berlin (about 6,000 people) and Munich, which are also fairly typical places of residence immigrants.

Languages
- Armenian and German

Religion
- Armenian Apostolic, Armenian Catholic

Related ethnic groups
- Armenian diaspora
- All figures from

Armenians in Germany (Armenian: Հայերը Գերմանիայում, romanized: Hayery Germaniayum; German: Armenier in Deutschland) are ethnic Armenians living within the modern republic of Germany. Like much of the Armenian diaspora, most Armenians immigrated to Germany after the Armenian genocide of 1915. Others came later, fleeing conflicts in places like Iran, Azerbaijan and Lebanon. Another influx came fleeing nationalist persecution in Turkey. After World War II, many Soviet Armenians, former POWs in particular, fled to the American occupied areas of Germany. While many traveled on, some settled in the country, providing a base for later asylum-seekers.

== History ==
The first recorded settlement of Armenians in Germany took place during the middle ages. These Armenian communities would cluster in major cities, such as Hamburg, Berlin, Munich, Stuttgart, and Frankfurt. In neighboring Poland-Lithuania, on the other hand, there were larger Armenian communities in important commercial cities, namely also in the northern cities Gdańsk and Toruń. In the course of several Partitions of Poland at the end of the 18th century, areas with an Armenian minority also came under Prussian control. In the course of the Napoleonic conquests, the Prussian territory shrank again, but was able to expand again after the Congress of Vienna in 1815, also at the expense of Poland. In the Historical-statistical overview of all provinces and components of the Prussian monarchy from 1820, for example, it is subsequently reported that "in the eastern provinces" of Prussia there were also Armenians, albeit "in scattered residences [...] without to form their own communities".

A few well-known Germans were (in part) of Armenian descent as early as the 19th and 20th centuries. These include the orientalist Friedrich Carl Andreas (1846–1920), whose father came from an Armenian family of minor princes and gave up his family name Bagratuni, or the co-founder of the Tchibo group Carl Tchilling -Hiryan (1910–1987), whose Armenian father was born in Aydın in western Turkey. There is already an Armenian descent legend for the early 18th century: According to a baptismal certificate, the founder of the Bavarian noble family Aretin, Johann Baptist Christoph Aroution Caziadur, is said to have been born in 1706 as the son of the Armenian petty prince Baldazar, who had fled from the Persians Caziadur and his wife Gogza of the House of the Princes of Qarabagh, to have been born in Constantinople.

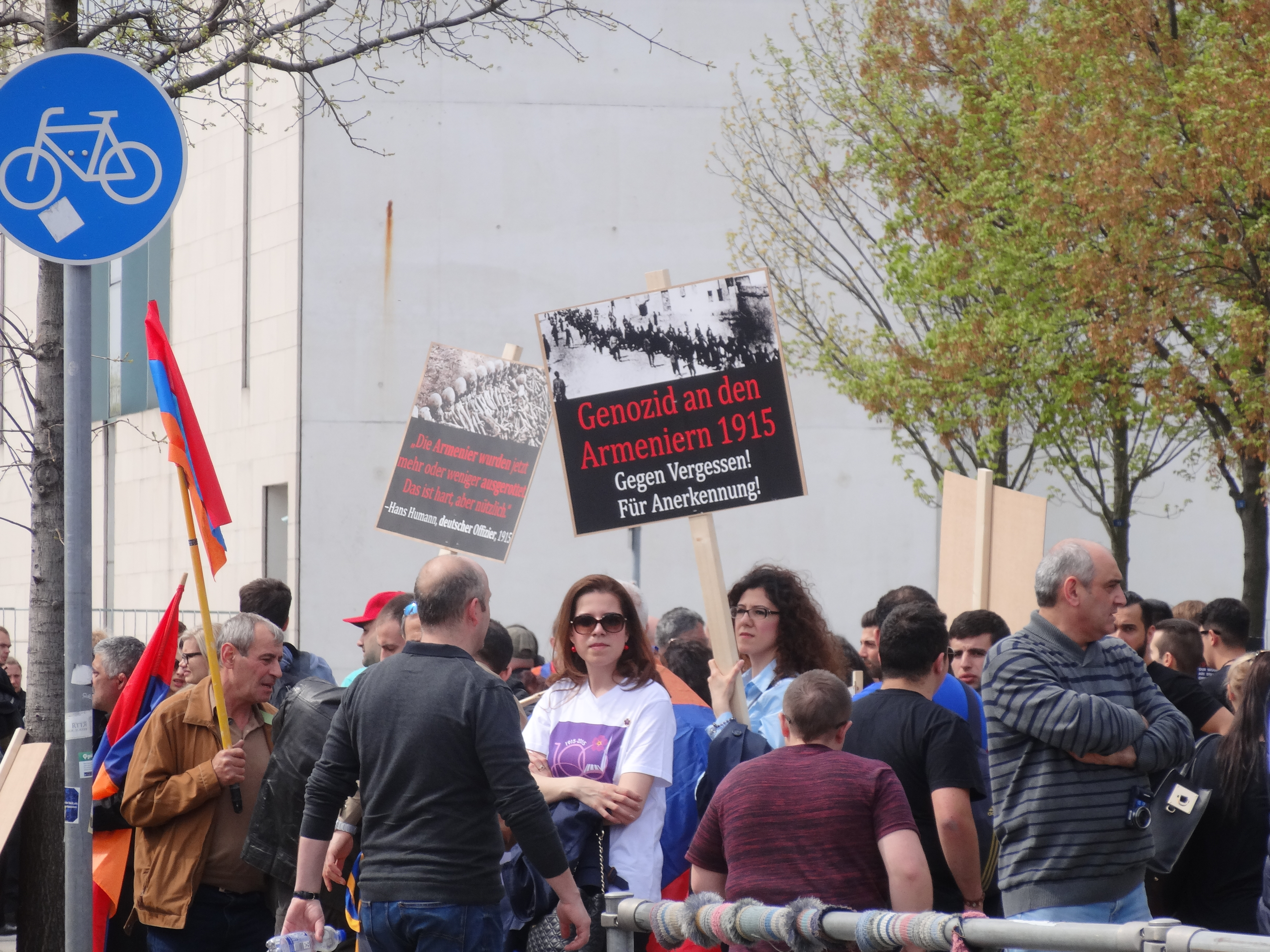
Armenians in Berlin protest on the Armenian Genocide Remembrance Day for its recognition by Germany

The first Armenian organization in Germany was the Armenian Colony of Berlin, founded around 1923. Until 1975, Armenian associations in Hamburg, Berlin, Cologne, Frankfurt am Main, Stuttgart and Munich established. In the 1980s other associations in Bremen, Braunschweig, Bielefeld, Duisburg, Neuwied, Bonn, Hanau, Eppingen, Nuremberg, Kehl and other places throughout Germany.

More than 25,000 naturalized Armenians and 15,000 Armenians seeking asylum are currently living in the Federal Republic of Germany. They focus on Mecklenburg-Vorpommern, as well on Schleswig-Holstein, many of whom are Armenian asylum seekers coming directly from Armenia and for whom the Armenian Apostolic Church services, baptisms, Bible readings and provides community assistance. The Diocese of Germany bears the costs of assisting Armenians from post-Soviet Armenia and considers these services part of its mission.

In 2025 the ethnic Armenian population can be moderately estimated at a total of about 100,000 people, 32,815 Armenian nationals from the Armenian republic, 30,000 with roots in Turkey (for a long time the biggest Armenian group in Germany), 10,000 Iran, 10,000 Ukraine and Russia, 5,000 Syria, 5,000 Bulgaria and Romania, 3,000 Lebanon, 2,000 Iraq, 2,000 Western nations like France and the United States.

The Armenian Apostolic Church in Germany seated in Cologne currently has 17 church communities all around the country. Furthermore, many cultural clubs and organisations exist.

== See also ==
- Armenia–Germany relations
- Armenian diaspora
- German-Armenian Society
