= Stetler =

Stetler is a surname. Notable people with the surname include:

- Bob Stetler (1952–1990), American soccer player
- Stephen Stetler (born 1949), American politician

== See also ==
- Stelter
