= Paul Rohrbach =

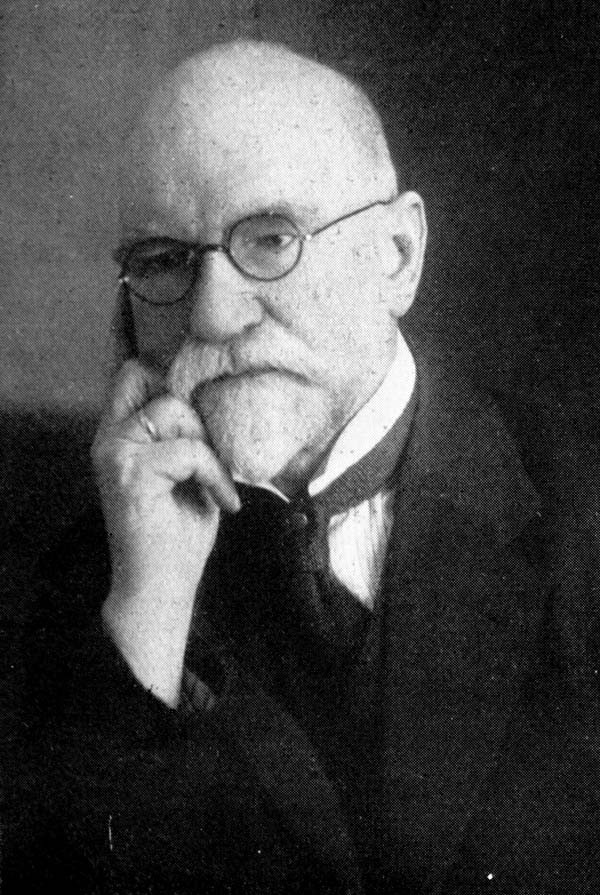
Paul Rohrbach in 1931

Paul Rohrbach (29 June 1869 – 19 July 1956) was a Baltic German writer, concerned with "world politics." He was born at Irgen manor, Raņķi parish, Skrunda Municipality, in the Courland Governorate (then part of the Russian Empire). Between 1887 and 1896 he attended the universities of Dorpat, Berlin, and Strasbourg.

== Biography ==
Rohrbach traveled extensively in Asia (especially China) and Africa, and in 1903-06 he was Settlement Commissioner to Southwest Africa. After returning to Berlin, he became a lecturer of colonial economy at the Handelshochschule Berlin.

His writings include many books on political conditions in the countries visited by him, with much attention to the effects of German colonization and interests. His Der deutsche Gedanke in der Welt was translated into English by Edmund von Mach as German World Policies (1915), and Der Krieg und die deutsche Politik (1914) appeared in an English translation by P. H. Phillipson as Germany's Isolation: An Exposition of the Economic Causes of the Great War (1915). Most of the latter book was written before the start of the First World War.

Rohrbach was an unapologetic racist and a vocal supporter of German colonial expansion. He unequivocally asserted that Black societies in Africa were racially incapable of creating advanced cultures and sophisticated political structures. From this premise he concluded that Germans were justified in seizing and developing 'underused' land and labor in Africa.

In practice, he endorsed brutal systems of compulsory labor for native Africans in Germany's colonies. He also encouraged colonial governments to expropriate indigenous lands for distribution to white settlers. Rohrbach considered the African labor extremely valuable to colonial economies, and wanted to preserve indigenous populations. However, he recommended that settlers and colonial states freely employ violence to suppress and deter native resistance. He also sanctioned eradicating rebellious African tribes.

== Works ==
Rohrbach wrote more broadly on German foreign policy, particularly during the First World War. He became an influential public voice in Germany's debate over war aims, and contributed directly to discussions over objectives within the German government. Rohrbach strongly favored projecting German power into Eastern Europe at the expense of the Russian Empire. However, he did not believe that colonial structures would be appropriate for governing the spaces and populations of Eastern Europe. Rohrbach proposed that the German Empire directly annex the Russian governorates along the Baltic Coast (Kovno, Vilna, Courland, Livonia, and Estonia), and recommended using education and settlement policy to gradually Germanize their Estonian, Latvian, Lithuanian, and White Ruthenian populations. He also strongly supported establishing German control over Congress Poland, but believed that the political and cultural sophistication of the Polish nation effectively prohibited annexation and Germanization. He instead supported the creation of an autonomous Polish state, which would govern its own domestic affairs, but accept the German Empire's direction of a common foreign policy and military affairs. The German Empire pursued this imperial policy in 1916 when it established the Kingdom of Poland.

== See also ==
- German–Armenian Society
