= Moral courage =

Courage to take action for moral reasons

Moral courage is the courage to take action for moral reasons despite the risk of adverse consequences. Courage is required in order to take action when one has doubts or fears about the consequences. Moral courage, therefore, involves deliberation or careful thought. Reflecive actions or dogmatic fanaticism do not involve moral courage because such impulsive actions are not based upon moral reasoning. Moral courage may also require physical courage when the consequences are punishment or other bodily peril. Moral courage has been seen as the exemplary modernist form of courage.

== Parenting approach ==
Incorporating moral courage into parenting can affect the self-expression of the child during late adolescence. It is more likely for a person to exemplify moral courage in adulthood if they were raised receiving respect and compassion from their parents than if they were raised in a violent environment. Parents teaching moral values such as empathy, justice, equality, and a caring focus on others are indicative of the development of moral courage. The development of moral courage within parenting is not only affected by the parent's passed-down moral values but the children's autonomy on how to perceive and practice their moral values. Those who incorporate the practice of their moral values into their everyday lives engage in moral courage to protect those values as well.

== Examples of moral courage ==
Moral courage can be shown through selfless actions aimed at diminishing or eliminating discrimination. A study used qualitative research methods to analyze the process of how and why individuals become allies to LGBTQ people. The study mentions how human resources development play a role to help prevent LGBTQ discrimination in the workplace.

Moral courage is demonstrated when individuals stand up for moral principles, even if it puts them in danger or the violation of those principles does not directly affect them. During the Holocaust, many non-Jews demonstrated moral courage by risking their lives to save and help rescue Jews, often individuals and families they had never met. The likelihood of this kind of moral courage is less determined by external situational factors and more indicative of the internal traits and qualities of the individuals rescuing Jews. Some traits that drive people to exhibit this kind of moral courage include empathy, a sense of social responsibility, strong ethical standards such as justice and equality, advanced moral judgment, and the openness to take risks.

== Moral courage anonymity ==
Many different aspects can contribute to moral courage. Something that may inhibit moral courage however, is the undesirable consequences in their personal, social, and work life. A way of counteracting those adverse consequences and increasing moral courage may be by adding anonymity. In a study on online moral courage, they found that moral courage and anonymity online had a positive correlation. Moral courage was also correlated with gender, age, and education levels, therefore, those who are older, male, and have lower levels of education are more likely to perform acts of moral courage when they perceive that they are acting anonymously compared to those who are young, female, and have higher levels of education. Even when controlling those factors, there is still a positive correlation.
