= Rolf Hosfeld =

German historian

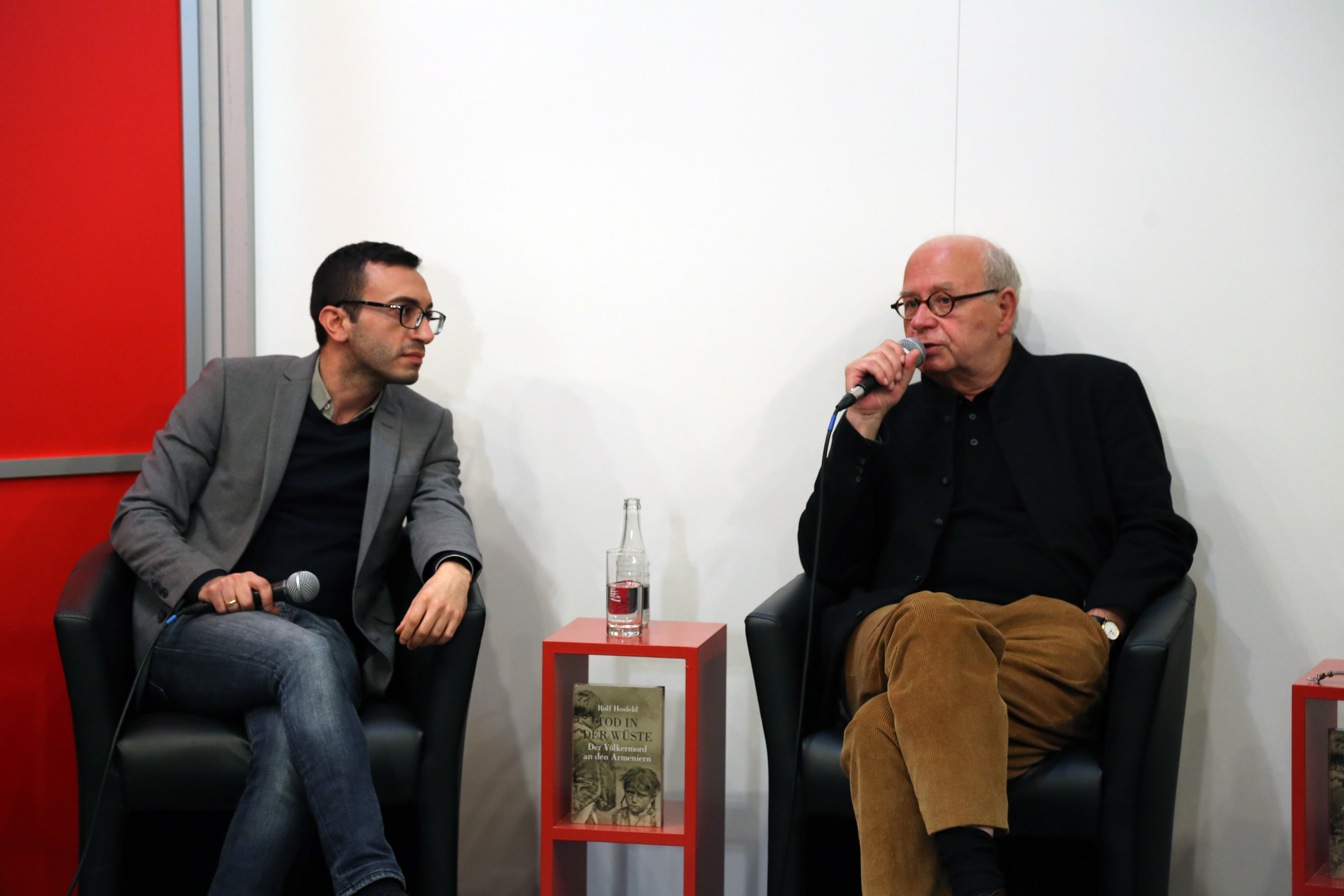
Mike Josef und Rolf Hosfeld at the Frankfurt Book Fair 2015 (presenting: Tod in der Wüste. Völkermord an den Armeniern by Rolf Hosfeld)

Rolf Hosfeld (22 June 1948 – 23 July 2021) was the Academic Director of the Lepsiushaus, a Research Center for Genocide Studies in Potsdam Germany, and worked as an independent writer and historian.

== Life ==
After graduating the Johannes Althusius Gymnasium in Bad Berleburg, Hosfeld was trained in journalism at the newspaper Westfälische Rundschau. He studied German language and literature, political science, modern history, and philosophy in Frankfurt and West Berlin, completing an M.A. in West Berlin in 1976 and going on to earn a doctoral degree there. His doctoral dissertation on Heinrich Heine is widely considered to have paved the way for a new, postmodern approach to Heine, on whom he has continued to publish.

Hosfeld has worked as a lecturer at Free University of Berlin, editor of the reviews konsequent and omnibus, editor at a Berlin publishing house, member of the editorial board of the monthly Merian, deputy editor-in-chief of the monthly Der Feinschmecker, chief editor of the feature pages of the Hamburg weekly Die Woche, editor-in-chief of the book series Kulturverführer, and as a film and television producer in Berlin. He has produced some fifty films, directing fifteen himself, among them a four-part series on fascism as a pan-European phenomenon and a three-part series on post-1945 civil wars in Eastern Europe.

Hosfeld has been member of the Verband deutscher Schrifsteller (VS, the German Writers’ Union) since 1982 and has served on the board of directors of the Peter Weiss Foundation for Art and Politics since 2002. In addition to extensive journalism, essays, and travel writing, he has produced numerous scholarly articles, films, and television and radio programs, as well as some twenty books on modern culture and modern and contemporary history. Since 2004, he has been active essentially as an independent author and historian.

His history of the Armenian genocide (2005) continues to generate broad public discussion. His most ambitious project to date has been a four-volume History of the Germans 1815–2007, with accompanying DVDs by Hermann Pölking. Besides this he has published a history of the GDR and a biography of the Jewish-German writer and satirist Kurt Tucholsky. The social-democratic Friedrich Ebert Foundation awarded him its prize “Das politische Buch” (the political book) in 2010 for his book Karl Marx: An Intellectual Biography (German title: Die Geister, die er rief. Eine neue Karl-Marx-Biographie), that has already been translated into several languages.

Rolf Hosfeld lived in the countryside near Potsdam and died July 2021.
