= Avetik Isahakyan =

Armenian writer and activist (1875–1957)

- Ավետիք Իսահակյան
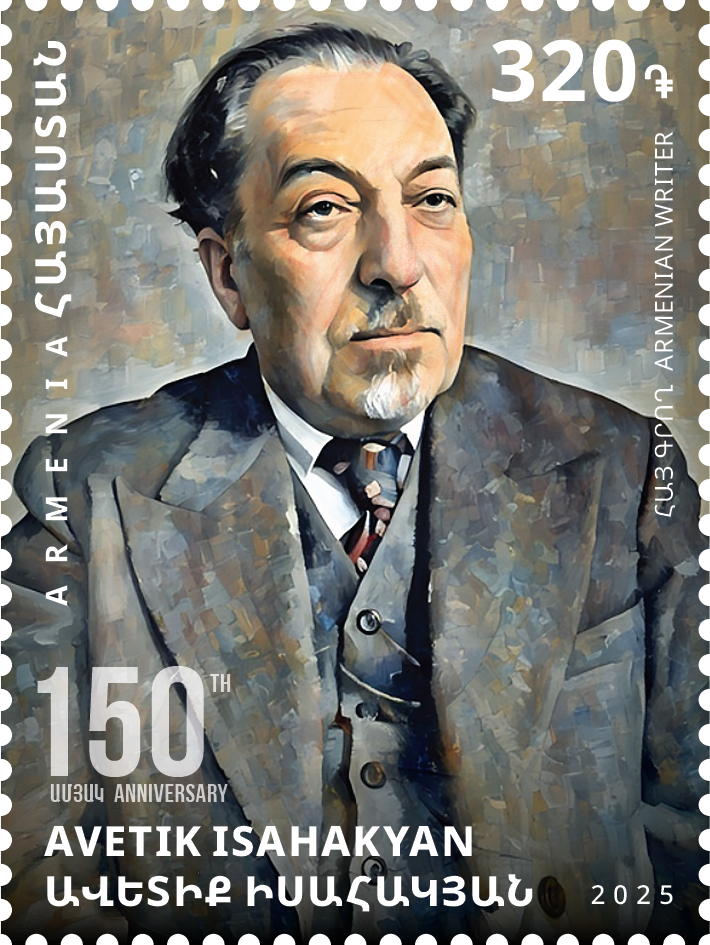
- Isahakyan on a 2025 stamp of Armenia
- Born: October 30, 1875; Alexandropol, Erivan Governorate, Russian Empire (now, Gyumri, Armenia)
- Died: October 17, 1957 (aged 81); Yerevan, Armenian SSR, Soviet Union
- Resting place: Komitas Pantheon
- Education: Gevorgian Seminary; Leipzig University
- Occupations: Poet, novelist
- Spouse: Sophia Kocharian
- Writing career
- Language: Armenian
- Notable awards: Stalin State Prize; Order of Lenin (2)

Avetik Sahaki Isahakyan (Armenian: Ավետիք Սահակի Իսահակյան; October 30, 1875 – October 17, 1957) was an Armenian lyric poet, writer and public activist.

== Biography ==
Isahakyan was born in Alexandropol (present-day Gyumri, Armenia) in 1875. He was educated at the Gevorgian Seminary in Etchmiadzin, and later at the University of Leipzig, where he studied philosophy and anthropology. He started his literary as well as political careers in his early youth. Upon his return from Leipzig in 1895 he entered the ranks of the newly established Alexandropol committee of the Armenian Revolutionary Federation. Through his activities he supported armed groups and financial aid sent to Ottoman Armenia from Alexandropol. He was arrested in 1896 and spent a year in Yerevan’s prison.

Later Isahakyan went abroad, attending literature and history of philosophy classes at the University of Zurich. He returned to his homeland in 1902, and then moved to Tiflis (modern-day Tbilisi).

Together with 158 other Armenian intellectuals, he was arrested in 1908 and after spending half a year in Tiflis's Metekha prison (just like Hovhannes Tumanyan), he was freed on bail. Staying in the Caucasus was no longer possible, and by 1911 Isahakyan had emigrated.

Isahakyan did not believe the promises made by the government of the Young Turks regarding self-government and autonomy of Ottoman Armenia. Assured that the danger of Pan-Turkism (which he believed was aimed at the total extinction of Armenians) could be prevented by Turkey’s supporter, Germany, Isahakyan went to Berlin. There, together with a number of German intellectuals, he participated in the German-Armenian movement, and edited the group’s journal Mesrob and co-founded German–Armenian Society. The start of World War I and the horrifying massacres confirmed his gruesome predictions about the annihilating nature of the Young Turks government's policies. After the war and the Armenian genocide, Isahakyan described through his compositions the Armenians' sorrowful destiny and their heroic struggle for freedom. The poet put forward the genocide accusations, the worst part of which had taken place between 1915 and 1922, in "The White Book". During that period, Isahakyan expressed his ideas mainly through his social and political articles, in which he discussed the topics of the Armenian cause, reunification of Armenia and the restoration of the Armenian government. The images of the massacres are persistent in his poems, such as "Snow has Covered Everything...", "To Armenia...", and "Here Comes Spring Again".

Korney Chukovsky met him in Kislovodsk in 1926 and wrote in his diary:

I've just had a visit from four Armenians, one of whom, Avetik Isaakyan, is a well-known poet. I can't tell you what a nice man he is: modest, quiet, completely unaffected. He spent a fortnight here without anyone's knowing who he was. Yet his fame is such that when I mentioned him to our Armenian barber, he immediately beamed and started reciting his poetry in Armenian. The shoeshine man had the same reaction: "Avetik! Avetik!" He has a sad, absent look about him. They say the regime (which pays him a small pension) won't let him visit his family abroad. I was surprised to find that he was unable to recite even four lines of his verse in Armenian when I asked him to: he's forgotten everything. And when we had an Armenian evening and his poems were read from the podium he just sat there in the audience, hunched forward, his hands over his face. He refused to go out on the podium or utter a single word.

Isahakyan again went abroad in 1930 and lived in Paris, but returned permanently to Soviet Armenia in 1936. During Joseph Stalin's Great Purge, the poet fell "under the suspicion of the local [Armenian] NKVD," but avoided arrest due to the intervention of Anastas Mikoyan.

Isahakyan was elected to the Academy of Sciences of the Armenian SSR in 1943 and became president of the Writers Union of the Armenian SSR in 1944. He was awarded the Stalin State Prize in 1946, served as a member of the Soviet Committee for Protection of Peace, and was a deputy of the II-IV Supreme Soviets of the Armenian SSR. He was awarded the Order of Lenin twice and decorated with other medals.

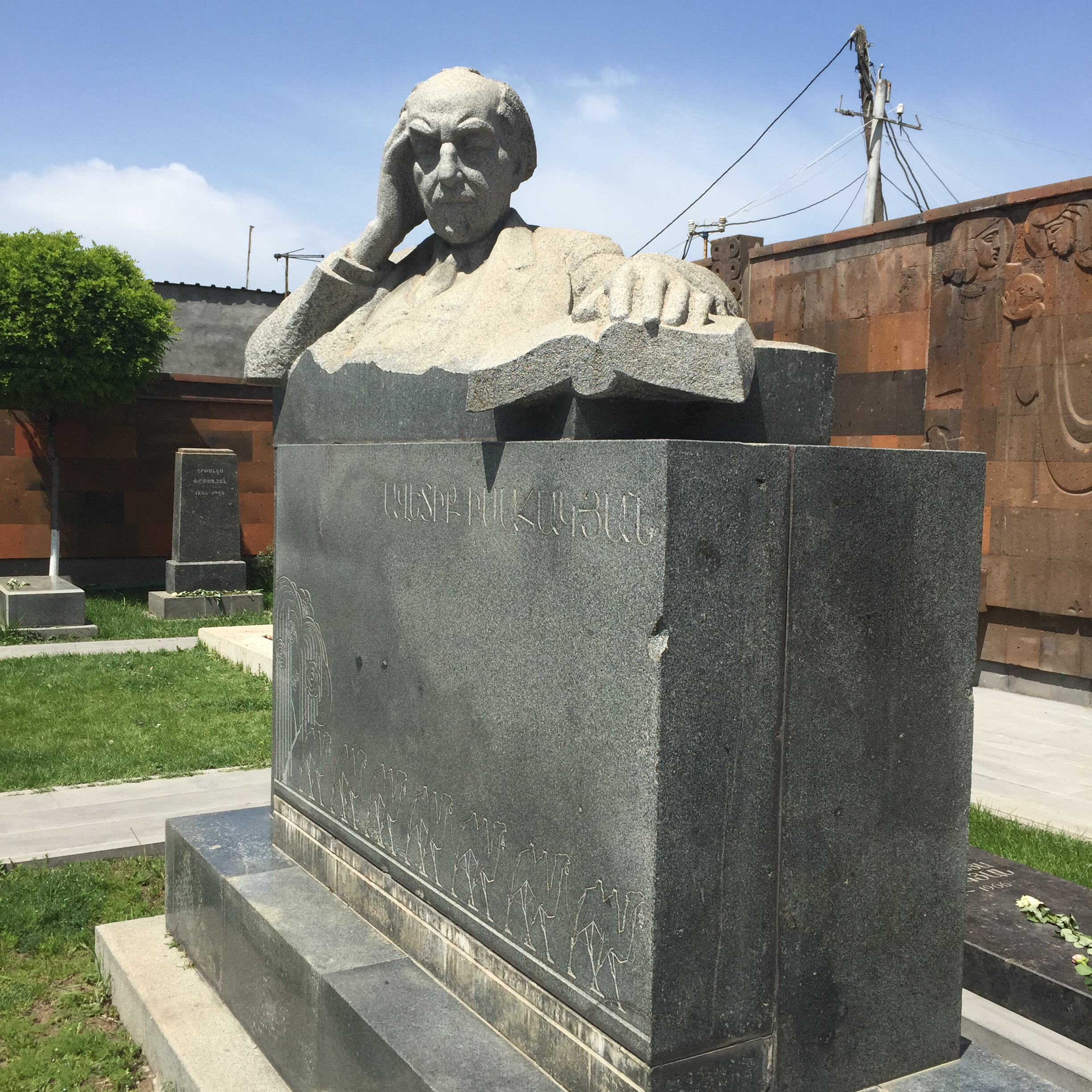
Isahakyan's tomb at Yerevan's Komitas Pantheon

Seeing that Gyumri's famous satirist Poloz Mukuch did not have a tombstone twenty years after his death, Isahakyan ordered one, with the side of the tombstone reading "To Poloz Mukuch (Mkrtich Ghazarosi Melkonyan); and the other side: "A memento from the poet Avetik Isahakyan."

Isahakyan died in Yerevan on October 17, 1957. He is buried at Komitas Pantheon, which is located in the city center of Yerevan.

== Works ==
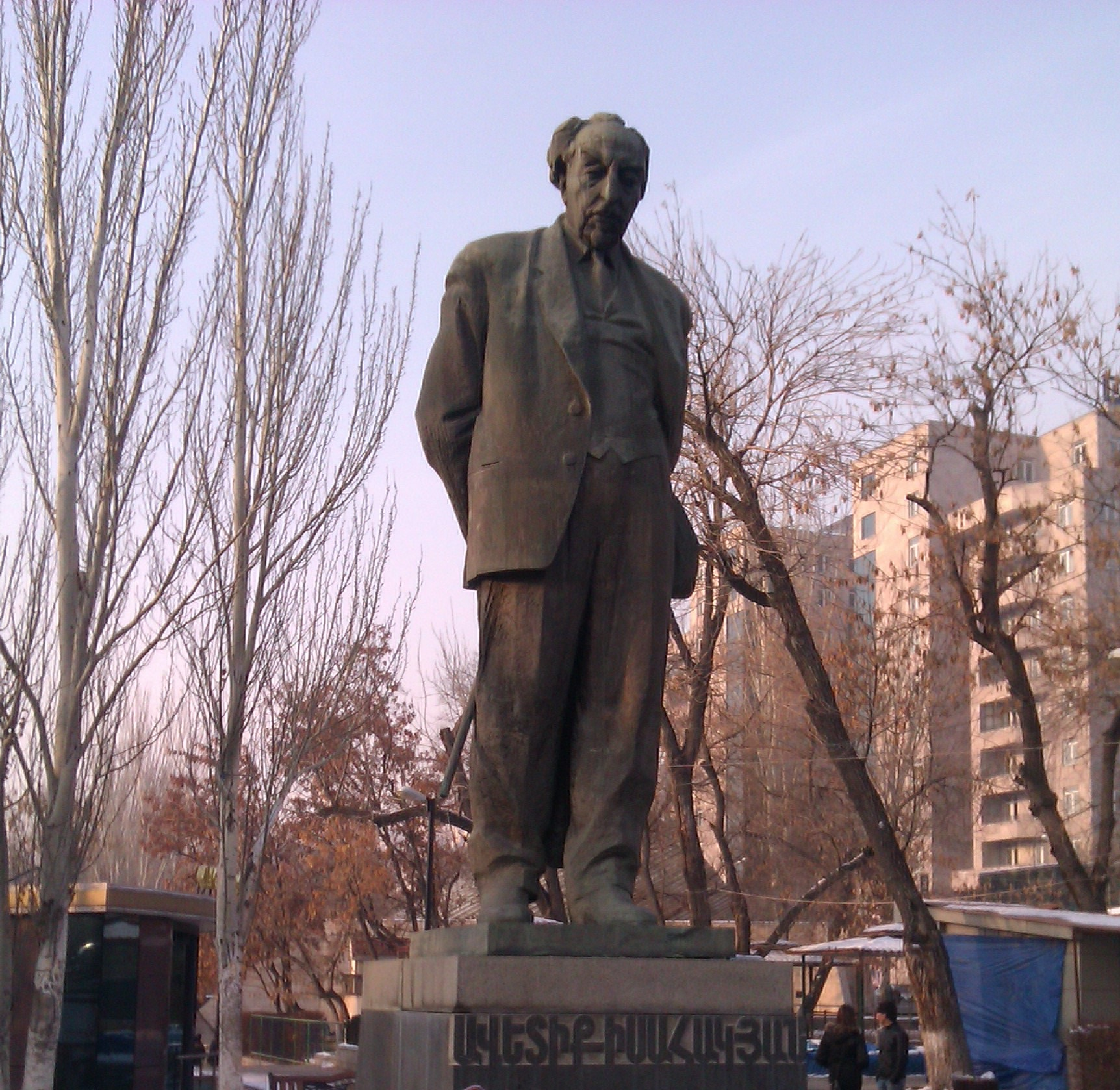
The bronze-granite statue of Isahakyan in Circular Park in Yerevan, by sculptor Sargis Baghdasaryan and architect Liparit Sadoyan, 1965

Upon his release from the prison, 1897, he published first compilation of his poems "Songs and Wounds", however soon was arrested again for his activities "against Russia's Tsar" and sent to Odessa. The lyricism, emotional charge and melody of his poems earned him immediate popularity. His best works are filled with sorrow and lament meditations about the fate of the humanity, injustice of life. His compositions are penetrated with love to one's motherland and people.

Between 1899 and 1906 he wrote "The Songs of Haiduks", a compilation of poems that became the first creation within classical Armenian poetry dedicated to the Armenian freedom struggle.

A symbolic story portraying the Armenian politics and Armenian cause of the 19th early 20th centuries must have been "Usta Karo", an unfinished novel, the work on which had accompanied the writer through all his life. "Usta Karo will be done on the day when the Armenian cause is resolved", the master himself used to say. Ishakyan could not get used the idea of a dismembered Armenia. With a deep emotional pain and bitterness in his heart he continued to believe that a time would come when the Armenian people would return to their native shores.

Isahakyan returned to the Soviet Armenia in 1926 where he published a new collection of his poems and stories (e.g. "A Pipe of Patience" – 1928). Between 1930 and 1936 he lived abroad where he acted as a friend of the Soviet Union. He later had finally moved back to Armenia where he continued his enormous social work. Among his works of that time are famous "Our historians and Our Minstrels" (1939), "To my Motherland" (1940), "Armenian Literature" (1942) or "Sasna Mher" (1937).

His poems are those of love and sorrow. One of his best known works is the philosophical poem "Abu-Lala Mahari" (1909–1911), while his other well-known works include "Songs and Novels" and "The Mother's Heart". Being a romantic, Isahakyan was best known for his verse "On the Bridge of Realto" dedicated to his first love. During the Second World War of 1941–1945, he wrote patriotic poems like "Martial Call" (1941), "My Heart is at the Mountains' Top" (1941), "To the Undying Memory of S. G. Zakyan" (1942), "The Day of the Great Victory" (1945) and many other. The Great Soviet Encyclopedia characterized his creative work as "filled with humanism, and a great respect for human dignity" and "deeply connected with the history and culture of the Armenian people, embracing the best traditions of Russian and world literature." The Russian poet Alexander Blok characterized him as a "first class poet, fresh and simple, whom one, perhaps, cannot find in Europe anymore."

Isahakyan's works have been translated in many languages and his poems have been used as lyrics for songs.

== Legacy ==
Upon Isahakyan's death in 1957, Anastas Mikoyan wrote that the poet "sacredly preserved the best traditions of the centuries-old culture of old Armenia and, through his tireless creative work, made an invaluable contribution to the construction of a new socialist culture in Armenia." One of the busiest streets of Yerevan, stretching for 1.1 km from Nalbandyan Street to Baghramyan Avenue, was named after Isahakyan. The bronze-granite statue of Isahakyan by sculptor Sargis Baghdasaryan and architect Liparit Sadoyan was opened in 1965 in Yerevan's Circular Park.

The first public library of Yerevan opened on Amiryan Street in 1935 was named after Isahakyan in 1955, on his 80th birthday. Isahakyan's portrait appears on the Armenian 10,000 dram bill. It was also featured on an Armenian postage stamp in 2000 and a Soviet postage stamp in 1975.

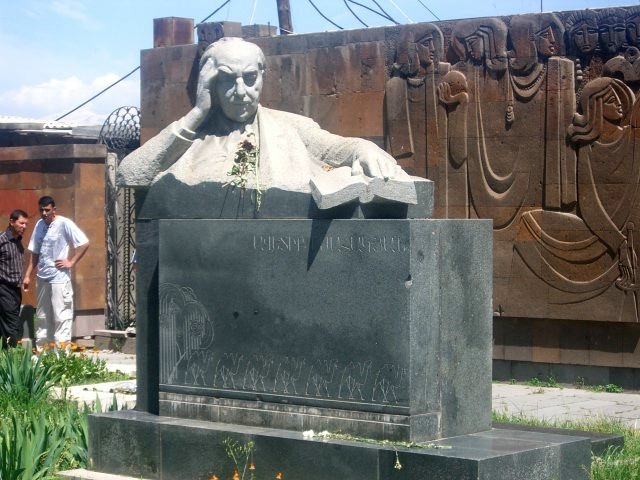
Tomb of Isahakyan in Yerevan

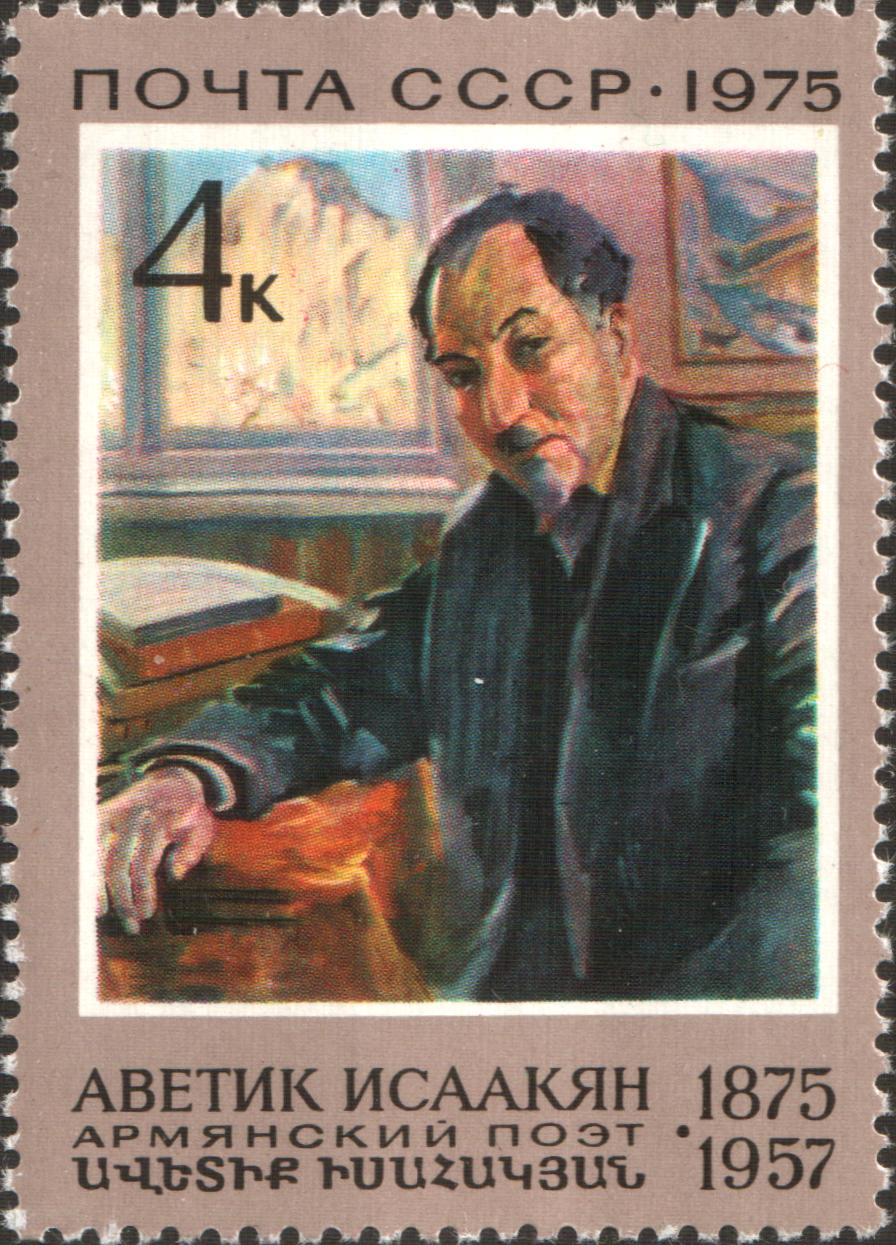
Isahakyan on a 1975 Soviet postage stamp.

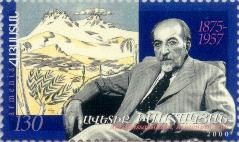
Isahakyan on a 2000 Armenian postage stamp.

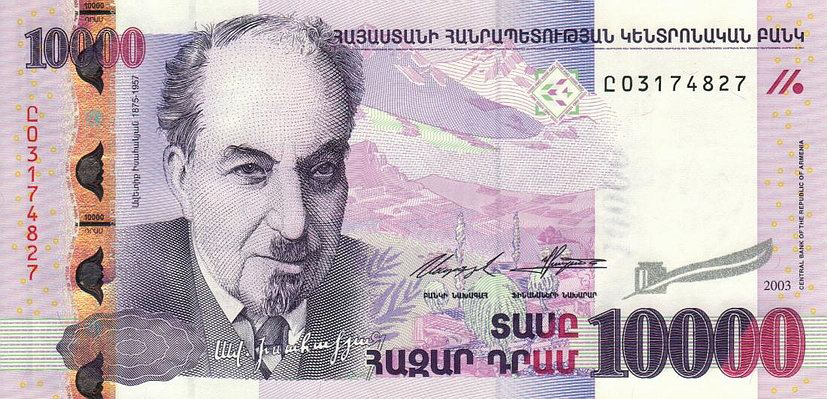
Isahakyan on an Armenian 10,000-dram banknote.

== See also ==
- Statue of Avetik Isahakyan
