= 1965 Yerevan demonstrations =

Protests marking the 50th anniversary of the Armenian genocide

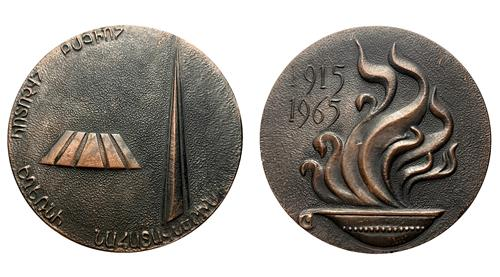
- Medal created in Soviet Armenia. Obverse: "Eternal Memory to the Martyrs of the Holocaust" in Armenian. Dually dated 1915 and 1965. View of the Armenian Genocide Memorial in Tsitsernakaberd. Reverse: Flame in urn, 1915/1965 to upper left
- Date: 24 April 1965
- Location: Yerevan, Armenian SSR, Soviet Union
- Goals: Commemoration and recognition of the Armenian genocide Calls for unification of Nagorno-Karabakh and Nakhichevan with Soviet Armenia
- Result: Construction of Tsitsernakaberd

Parties
Protesters

Lead figures
No leadership; Paruyr Sevak	

Number
20,000 to 200,000	

The 1965 Yerevan demonstrations were illegal political demonstrations that took place in Yerevan, Soviet Armenia on 24 April 1965, on the 50th anniversary of the Armenian genocide. Historians of Armenia regard the event as the first step in the struggle for the recognition of the Armenian genocide of 1915, and a significant precursor to the Karabakh movement of 1988. The events were the first such demonstration in the entire Soviet Union, and marked "the first time that [the genocide] was publicly commemorated in Soviet Armenia."

== Background ==
On 11 March 1954, Anastas Mikoyan gave a speech in Yerevan, where he called for the rehabilitation of the poet Yeghishe Charents and urged Armenians to reaffirm their national identity. The speech marked the beginning of the Khrushchev Thaw in Soviet Armenia. In this more open environment, the Armenian government of Yakov Zarobyan, with the approval of Moscow, decided to organize an official commemoration of the Armenian genocide on its 50th anniversary in 1965. The event would be held at the Yerevan Opera Theatre and involve "public officials, representatives of the Armenian Apostolic Church, and diaspora representatives." In addition, on 15 February 1965, the Armenian authorities adopted a resolution to complete a memorial honoring the 1.5 million Armenians who perished in the genocide.

== Demonstrations ==
The official event took place at the Opera Theatre on 24 April 1965. At the same time, a large group of protestors numbering approximately 20,000 held an illegal commemoration at the city's Lenin Square before splitting into separate groups and then moving toward the Opera. Among the participants in the demonstrations were Levon Ter-Petrosyan and Vazgen Manukyan, both future leaders of the Karabakh movement.

The aim of the demonstrators "was not to challenge the authority of the Soviet government." Instead, they demanded that the USSR officially recognize the genocide of 1915, on "a square that fused territorial claims, national culture, and history with revolution, class struggle, and internationalism." To the shouts of "our lands, our lands" (referring to Western Armenia), many also called for the unification of Nagorno-Karabakh and Nakhichevan with Soviet Armenia.

The crowds "demanded access" to the official ceremony held at the Opera Theatre, and some "three hundred hooligans" even broke into the building. The Soviet Armenian authorities "hastily evacuated the theater and broke up the demonstration." Water cannons were used to disperse some protestors, while Armenian Catholicos Vazgen I, who was present at the official event, "managed to calm" others.

== Aftermath ==
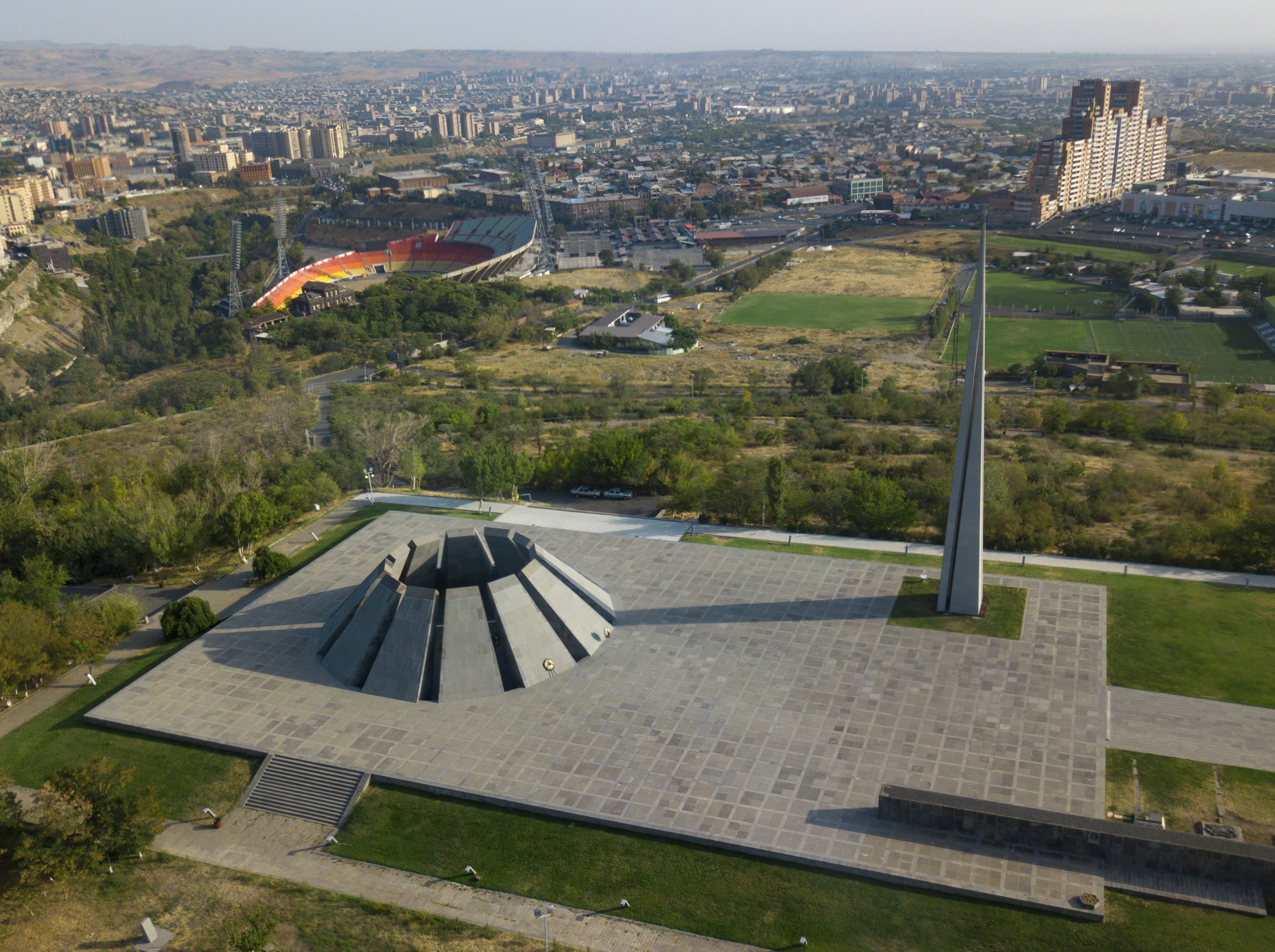
Tsitsernakaberd Memorial

In 1966, following another unauthorized demonstration in Moscow involving Silva Kaputikyan, Soviet authorities decided to encourage the construction of the genocide memorial. Originally planned for completion in 1965, the genocide memorial was officially finished in November 1967 at Tsitsernakaberd hill, just in time for the 53rd anniversary of the genocide. The completion of the Tsitsernakaberd memorial was the first step in honoring important events and figures in Armenia's long history. Since that time, Armenians (and many people from the post-Soviet space and all over the world) visit Tsitsernakaberd to honor the victims of the 1915 genocide.

In the aftermath of the demonstrations, Zarobyan was made Soviet Deputy Minister for Electrification, effectively a demotion. Although Zarobyan's dismissal is often associated with the 1965 protests, Yeghishe Astsatryan attributed his departure more to "backstage Soviet political intrigues." In September 1966, Zarobyan's successor, Anton Kochinyan, together with Badal Muradyan, appealed to Moscow for the unification of Nagorno-Karabakh with Soviet Armenia. Their request followed an appeal on the issue signed by 1,906 Soviet Armenian intellectual and cultural figures, including Martiros Saryan, Yervand Kochar, Hamo Sahyan, and Paruyr Sevak. However, the proposal was vetoed by the government of Soviet Azerbaijan, "reportedly with backstage support from Mikhail Suslov."

== Bibliography ==
- Atabaki, Touraj; Mehendale, Sanjyot (2004). Central Asia and the Caucasus: Transnationalism and Diaspora. London: Routledge. ISBN 9781134319947.
- Lehmann, Maike (2015). "Apricot Socialism: The National Past, the Soviet Project, and the Imagining of Community in Late Soviet Armenia". Slavic Review. 74 (1): 9–31.
- Malkasian, Mark (1996). Gha-ra-bagh!: The Emergence of the National Democratic Movement in Armenia. Detroit: Wayne State University Press. ISBN 0-8143-2605-6.
- Mithander, Conny; Sundholm, John; Holmgren Troy, Maria (2007). Collective Traumas: Memories of War and Conflict in 20th-Century Europe. Bruxelles: P.I.E.P. Lang. ISBN 9789052010687.
- Panossian, Razmik (2006). The Armenians: From Kings and Priests to Merchants and Commissars. New York: Columbia University Press. ISBN 978-0231139267.
- Saparov, Arsène (2018). "Re-negotiating the Boundaries of the Permissible: The National(ist) Revival in Soviet Armenia and Moscow's Response". Europe-Asia Studies. 70 (6): 862–883.
- Shakarian, Pietro A. (2025). Anastas Mikoyan: An Armenian Reformer in Khrushchev's Kremlin. Bloomington: Indiana University Press. ISBN 978-0253073556.
- Suny, Ronald Grigor (1993). Looking toward Ararat: Armenia in Modern History. Bloomington: Indiana University Press. ISBN 978-0-253-20773-9.
