= Ghukas =

Ghukas is an Armenian masculine given name, equivalent to English Luke. Notable people with the surname include:

- Ghukas Chubaryan (1923–2009), Armenian sculptor
- Ghukas Karnetsi (1722–1799), Armenian religious leader
- Ghukas Madoyan (1906–1975), Soviet military officer
- Ghukas Poghosyan (born 1994), Armenian footballer
