= Yakov Zarobyan =

Soviet Armenian politician (1908–1980)

- Յակով Զարոբյան
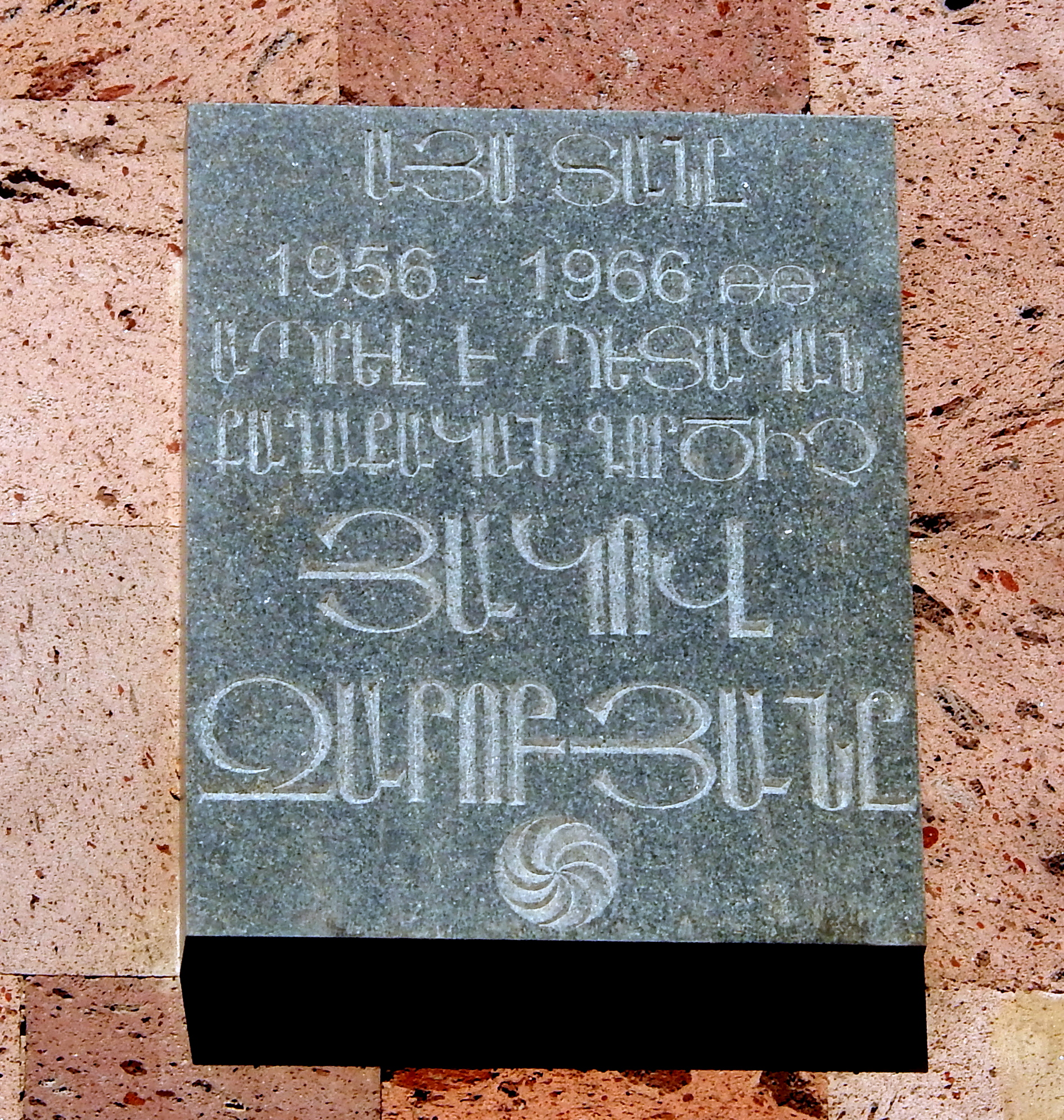
- Yakov Zarobyan's plaque in Yerevan

First Secretary of the Communist Party of Armenia
- In office 1960–1966
- Preceded by: Suren Tovmasyan
- Succeeded by: Anton Kochinyan

First Deputy Premier of the Armenian SSR
- In office June 1953 – July 1958

Deputy Minister of Security of the Armenian SSR
- In office April 1952 – 1953

Personal details
- Born: Hakob Nikitayi Zarobyan; September 25, 1908 Artvin, Batum oblast, Russian Empire (now in Turkey)
- Died: April 11, 1980 (aged 71) Moscow, Russian SFSR, Soviet Union
- Party: CPSU / Communist Party of Armenia
- Occupation: politician

Yakov Nikitayi Zarobyan (Armenian: Յակով Նիկիտայի Զարոբյան; 25 September 1908 – 11 April 1980) was a Soviet Armenian politician who served as the First Secretary of the Communist Party of Armenia from 1960 to 1966.

== Early life and career ==
Zarobyan was born in 1908 in Artvin, then in the Russian Empire, now in Turkey. Together with his family, he moved to Rostov-on-Don with the onset of World War I. In 1925, he moved to Kharkov and became a factory worker. In 1932, he joined the Communist Party and became the party secretary of the main Kharkov factory in 1939. In 1940, he became the secretary of the Stalin District of Kharkov and remained in that post until the start of the Great Patriotic War when the Germans captured the city. An active participant in the war, Zarobyan served as deputy secretary for the defense industry of the Omsk Oblast from 1942 to 1947. After the war, he became the third secretary of the Omsk Oblast.

== Career in Armenia ==
In 1949, Zarobyan moved to Soviet Armenia and held various positions in the republic's leadership, including Second Secretary of the Yerevan City Committee (1950–1952), Secretary of the Central Committee for Industry (1953–1958), First Deputy Premier (1958–1960), and Second Secretary (1960). In 1960, he succeeded Suren Tovmasyan as Armenia's First Secretary and oversaw the latter half of the Khrushchev Thaw in the republic.

As Armenia's first secretary, Zarobyan expanded relations with the Armenian diaspora, and played a key role in persuading Nikita Khrushchev to support the Arpa–Sevan tunnel, with advice from Anastas Mikoyan. Zarobyan also organized the 50th anniversary commemorations of the Armenian genocide in the republic and weathered the huge demonstrations in Yerevan of April 1965.

In 1966, Zarobyan was made Soviet Deputy Minister for Electrification, effectively a demotion, and was succeeded by Anton Kochinyan. Although Zarobyan's dismissal is often associated with the 1965 Yerevan demonstrations, Yeghishe Astsatryan attributed his departure more to "backstage Soviet political intrigues." Zarobyan died in Moscow in 1980 and was buried in Yerevan. The Arpa–Sevan tunnel was named in his honor in 2010.

== Bibliography ==
- Grybkauskas, Saulius (2020). Governing the Soviet Union's National Republics: The Second Secretaries of the Communist Party. London: Routledge. ISBN 978-1138391758.
- Lehmann, Maike (2015). "Apricot Socialism: The National Past, the Soviet Project, and the Imagining of Community in Late Soviet Armenia". Slavic Review. 74 (1): 9–31.
- Saparov, Arsène (2018). "Re-negotiating the Boundaries of the Permissible: The National(ist) Revival in Soviet Armenia and Moscow's Response". Europe-Asia Studies. 70 (6): 862–883.
- Shakarian, Pietro A. (2025). Anastas Mikoyan: An Armenian Reformer in Khrushchev's Kremlin. Bloomington: Indiana University Press. ISBN 978-0253073556.
