= Vardanashen =

Village in Armavir, Armenia

Vardanashen Վարդանաշեն
- Location within Armenia
- Coordinates: 40°03′06″N 44°11′26″E
- Country: Armenia
- Marz (Province): Armavir

Population (2011)
  - Total: 824
- Time zone: UTC+4 (AMT)

Vardanashen (Armenian: Վարդանաշեն; formerly, Chibukhchi) is a village in the Armavir Province of Armenia.

== Notable people ==
- Badal Muradyan (1915–1991), Soviet Armenian politician

== See also ==
- Armavir Province
