= Emblem of the Armenian Soviet Socialist Republic =

- Armiger: Armenian Soviet Socialist Republic
- Adopted: 1922/1937
- Motto: Պրոլետարներ բոլոր երկրների, միացե'ք (Armenian) «Пролетарии всех стран, соединяйтесь!» (Russian) ("Proletarians of the world, unite!")
- Earlier version

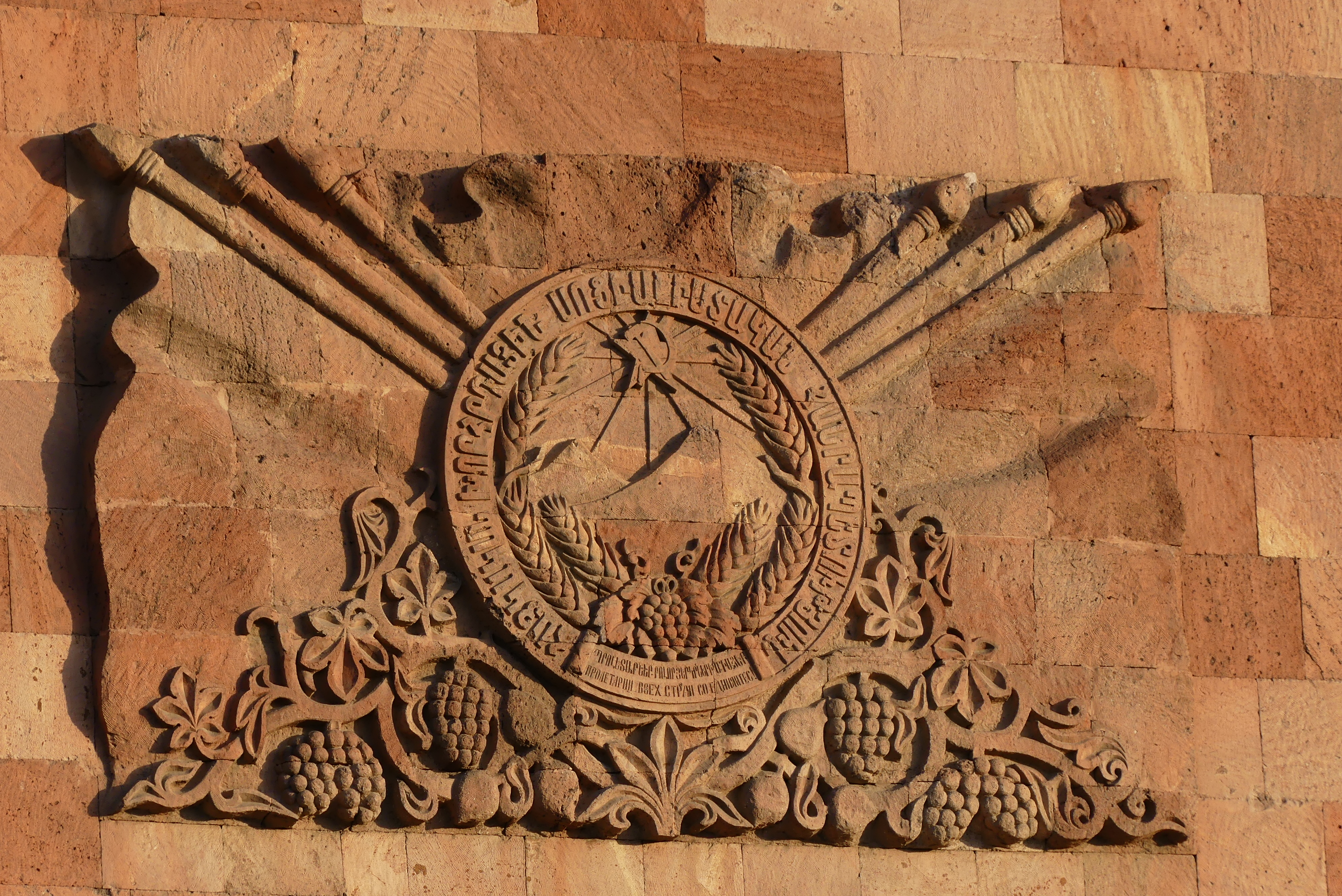
The emblem on the Armenian government building on Republic Square, Yerevan.

The Emblem of the Armenian Soviet Socialist Republic was devised from an initial prototype sketch by Martiros Saryan, a famous Armenian painter, and was adopted in 1922 by the government of the Armenian SSR.

== Overview ==
The emblem prominently features Mount Ararat, regarded as the national symbol of Armenia. The white grapes shown immediately beneath Ararat represent the traditional Biblical account of the first vineyard that Noah planted upon his descent from his ark as a sign of rebirth of humanity. The inner rim on the sides of the grapes includes wheat, symbolic of the land and natural resources of Armenia. Above Mount Ararat is the hammer and sickle with the red star behind it.

Printed on the outer rim are the words "Armenian Soviet Socialist Republic" in Armenian (Հայկական Սովետական Սոցիալիստական Հանրապետություն Haykakan Sovetakan Sots’ialistakan Hanrapetut’yun) while in the center outer rim is the motto "Workers of the world, unite!" in both Armenian (Պրոլետարներ բոլոր երկրների, միացե՜ք Proletarner bolor yerkrneri, miats’ek’!) and Russian (Пролетарии всех стран, соединяйтесь! Proletarii vsekh stran, soyedinyaytes′!).

According to an account (anecdote) widely reported since the 1920s, Turkey (Note: Variously identified as Turkish ambassador, Turkish Foreign Minister, or İsmet İnönü (Ismet Pasha).) raised the issue (Note: At Lausanne Conference of 1922–1923 according to an early source.) of Ararat being on Soviet Armenia's coat of arms with the Soviet Union. The Soviet response, attributed to Foreign Commissar Georgy Chicherin, pointed out that Turkey's flag features a crescent moon despite Turkey not owning the moon. Later sources described it as likely apocryphal. The account is mentioned in the memoirs of Nikita Khrushchev.

The emblem was changed in 1992 to the present coat of arms of Armenia which partially retains the Soviet one, in this case, the Mount Ararat.

== History ==
=== First revision ===
The Constitution of the Armenian SSR, adopted by the First Congress of the Soviets of Armenia on February 2, 1922, approved the description of the coat of arms of Armenian SSR. The emblem was an image of the ridges of the Greater and Lesser Masis (Ararat), over which, in the rays of the rising sun, there was a sickle and a hammer, at the foot - a bush of grapes with vines and leaves, ears of wheat, olive branches. Around the coat of arms on the margins there were inscriptions in Armenian "The Socialist Soviet Republic of Armenia" and "Proletarians of all countries, unite!"

The name of the republic in Armenian on the coat of arms of 1922 was read as "Hayastani Socialist Khordhayin Hanrapetutiun" (Socialist Soviet Republic of Armenia).

The image of the arms was made by Martiros Saryan and Hakob Kojoyan.

On banknotes of the Socialist Soviet Republic of Armenia in 1922, the version of the emblem was depicted. The abbreviation of the republic's name was placed in the upper part of the emblem in the rays of the sun, below the background of the mountains a sickle and a hammer, under them is the motto. On banknotes of 5.000.000 rubles of the same year, 1922, the image of a round coat of arms was used as a background, where the hammer and sickle were already depicted above the mountains.

Another revision on the emblem can be found on the Constitution of Armenian SSR, which was created on 26 May 1926 and approved by the 5th Congress of the Soviets of the USSR, April 3, 1927. The coat of arms is described as:

The State Emblem of the Socialist Soviet Republic of Armenia consists of images of the Greater and Little Ararat, under which, in the rays of the rising sun, there are a hammer and a sickle, placed cross-on-the-cross, handles knieu, at the foot of a vineyard bush with vines and leaves, grain ears, a little higher - olive branches. Around the coat of arms on the margins inscription "SSRA" and "Workers of all countries, unite!"

— Constitution of the Armenian SSR (1926), Chapter 105

=== Second revision ===
In 1927, the order of words in the name of the republic changed. The "Socialist Soviet Republic of Armenia" was replaced by the "Armenian Socialist Soviet Republic".

=== Third revision ===
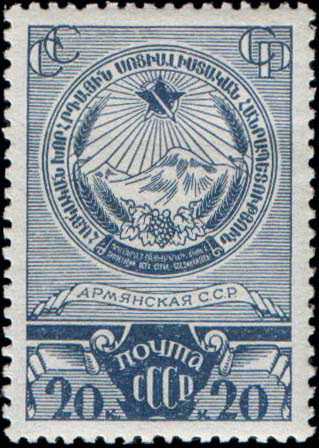
Emblem of the Armenian SSR on a 1937 postage stamp

The extraordinary IX Congress of Soviets of the Armenian SSR adopted on March 23, 1937, a new Constitution. The coat of arms was changed: an olive wreath was replaced with grain ears, the disk of the rising sun and its rays were removed from the picture, the sickle and hammer were illuminated with a five-pointed star, the inscription "Armenian Soviet Socialist Republic" ("Hayastani Socialist Khordhayin Hanrapetutiun", HSKH in Armenian) and "Workers of all countries, unite!" (in Armenian and Russian languages).

=== Fourth revision ===
The decree of the Presidium of the Supreme Soviet of the Armenian SSR of September 6, 1940, established a new translation of the words "countries" in the Armenian language in the motto of the emblem, and on March 29, 1941, the design of the emblem with the new version of the motto was approved.

On the coat of arms, the Armenian words of "Soviet" and "republic" were changed. A new version of the name of the republic in Armenian: "Haykakan Sovetakan Sotsialistakan Respublika" (HSSR).

=== Fifth revision ===
Since 1966, the word "Republic" has been translated again into the old language until the end of the Armenian SSR and for the first time, the Republic of Armenia had the inscription "Haykakan Sovetakan Socialistan Hanrapetutiun" (HSSH) on the coat of arms.

Article 120 of the Constitution of the Armenian SSR described the arms of the Republic as follows:

The state emblem of the Armenian Soviet Socialist Republic consists of the image of the Great and Lesser Ararat, a sickle and a hammer on top of a five-pointed star surrounded by rays, at the foot of the mountains a bush of vineyard with vine and leaves, wheatears and wheat on the right and left.

"Armenian Soviet Socialist Republic"

Below, on a red background, an inscription on a red background in Armenian and Russian "Proletarians of all countries, unite!"

In the Constitution of 1977 it was specified that the rays on the coat of arms are sunny.

== See also ==
- Coat of arms of Armenia
- Flag of the Armenian Soviet Socialist Republic
