= Yeghishe Astsatryan =

Soviet Armenian politician (1911–2008)

- Եղիշե Ասծատրյան
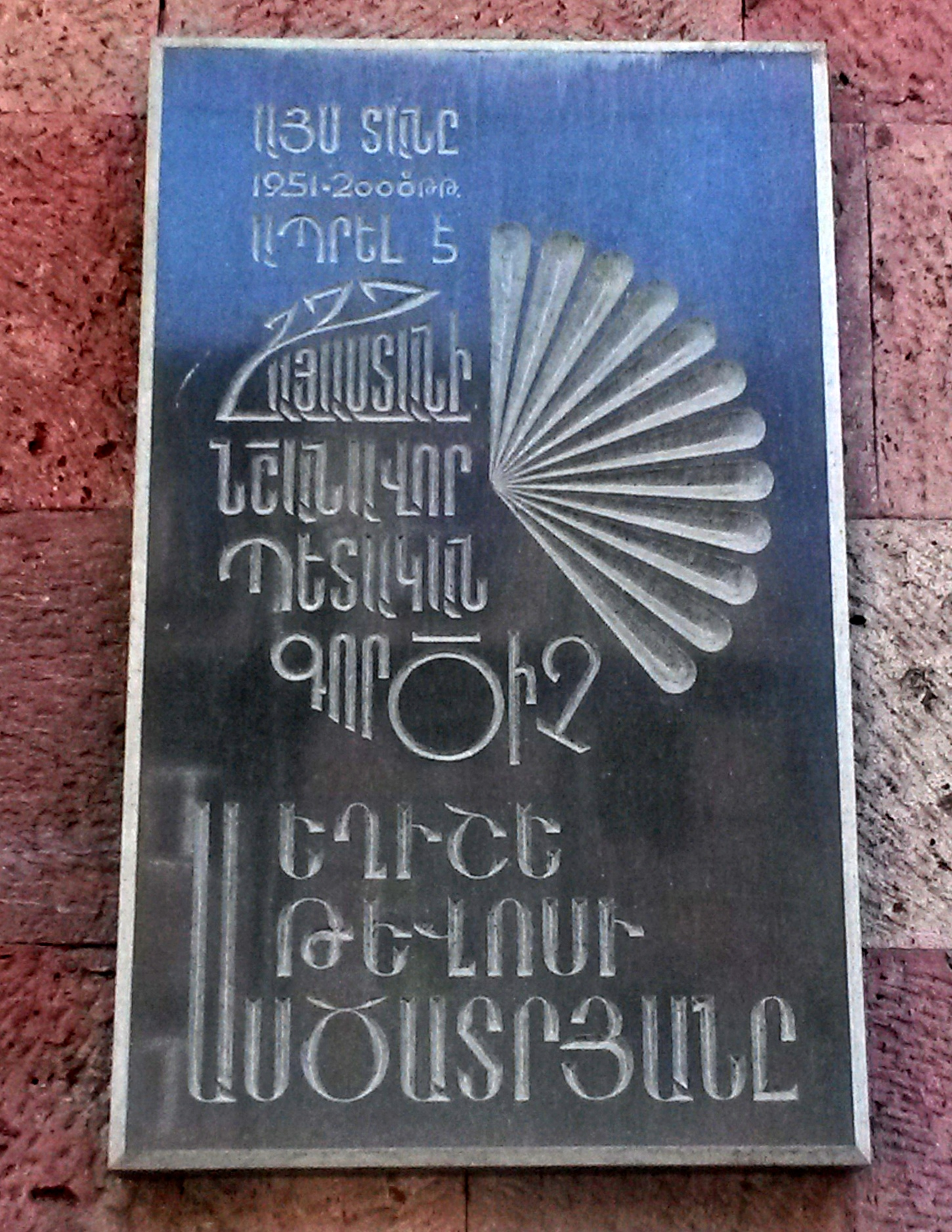
- Yeghishe Astsatryan's plaque at 24 Mashtots Avenue in Yerevan

Deputy Chairman of the Council of Ministers of the Armenian SSR
- In office December 1962 – 23 December 1965

Secretary of the Central Committee of the Communist Party of Armenia
- In office 24 December 1962 – 5 February 1966

Personal details
- Born: Yeghishe Tevosi Astsatryan; 2 September 1911 Chartar, Shusha uezd, Elizavetpol Governorate, Russian Empire
- Died: 2 December 2008 (aged 97) Yerevan, Armenia
- Party: CPSU / Communist Party of Armenia
- Education: Tbilisi Industrial Institute
- Occupation: politician, statesman

Yeghishe Tevosi Astsatryan (Armenian: Եղիշե Թևոսի Ասծատրյան; 2 September 1911 – 2 December 2008) was a Soviet Armenian politician and statesman who served as Deputy Chairman of the Council of Ministers of Armenia under First Secretary Yakov Zarobyan. A native of Chartar village in Nagorno-Karabakh, Astsatryan was a prominent figure in Armenia during the Khrushchev Thaw. He maintained close ties with Anastas Mikoyan and regularly consulted with him on affairs in Soviet Armenia and the Nagorno-Karabakh Autonomous Oblast (NKAO). He was a recipient of the Order of Lenin and a two-time recipient of the Order of the Red Banner of Labour, as well as the Order of St. Mesrop Mashtots.

== Memoirs ==
- Astsatryan, Yeghishe T. (2004). XX դար. Հայաստանի կառուցման ճանապարհին (in Armenian). Yerevan: Edit Print. ISBN 99941-36-61-5.
