= Flag of the Armenian Soviet Socialist Republic =

Armenian Soviet Socialist Republic
- Use: Civil and state flag, civil and state ensign
- Proportion: 1:2
- Adopted: 17 December 1952
- Relinquished: 24 August 1990
- Design: Red with a horizontal blue stripe with a gold hammer and sickle and gold-bordered red star in its upper canton.
- Reverse flag
- Use: Civil and state flag, civil and state ensign
- Armenian: Եռագույն (Yeřaguyn)
- Flag of the Armenian SSR (1990–1991) and the Republic of Armenia (1991–)
- Use: National flag
- Proportion: 1:2
- Adopted: 24 August 1990
- Design: A horizontal tricolour of red, blue, and orange.
- Designed by: Stepan Malkhasyants

The flag of the Armenian Soviet Socialist Republic was adopted on 17 December 1952 by the government of the Armenian SSR. The flag is similar to the flag of the Soviet Union but has a ¼-width horizontal blue stripe in the middle. The red represents the "revolutionary struggle of the working masses" and the golden hammer and sickle represents the peasants' and workers' union.

== History ==
The first flag of the Armenian SSR was introduced in the constitution, accepted on 2 February 1922 by the First Congress of Soviets of the Armenian SSR. The 1922 flag was red with the Cyrillic characters ССРА (SSRA for Социалистическая Советская Республика Армения, Sotsialisticheskaya Sovetskaya Respublika Armeniya) in the upper left corner.

That flag existed only for a month, because on March 12 the Armenian SSR united with the Georgian SSR and the Azerbaijan SSR under the Transcaucasian SFSR (TSFSR), that was split again into these three republics in 1936.

Between 1936 and 1940, the flag was red with the gold hammer and sickle in the top left hand corner. The Armenian characters ՀԽՍՀ (HKSH for Հայկական Խորհրդային Սոցիալիստական Հանրապետություն, Haykakan Khorhrdayin Sotsialistakan Hanrapetutiun) were in gold beneath the hammer and sickle.

Between 1940 and 1952, after reforms on Armenian language, the Armenian characters in the top left hand corner beneath the hammer and sickle were changed to ՀՍՍՌ (HSSR for Հայկական Սովետական Սոցիալիստական Ռեսպուբլիկա, Haykakan Sovetakan Sotsialistakan Respublika) staying in gold.

The 1952 flag was replaced in 1990 by the tricolor flag of Armenia based on the 1918 flag of the first Republic of Armenia.

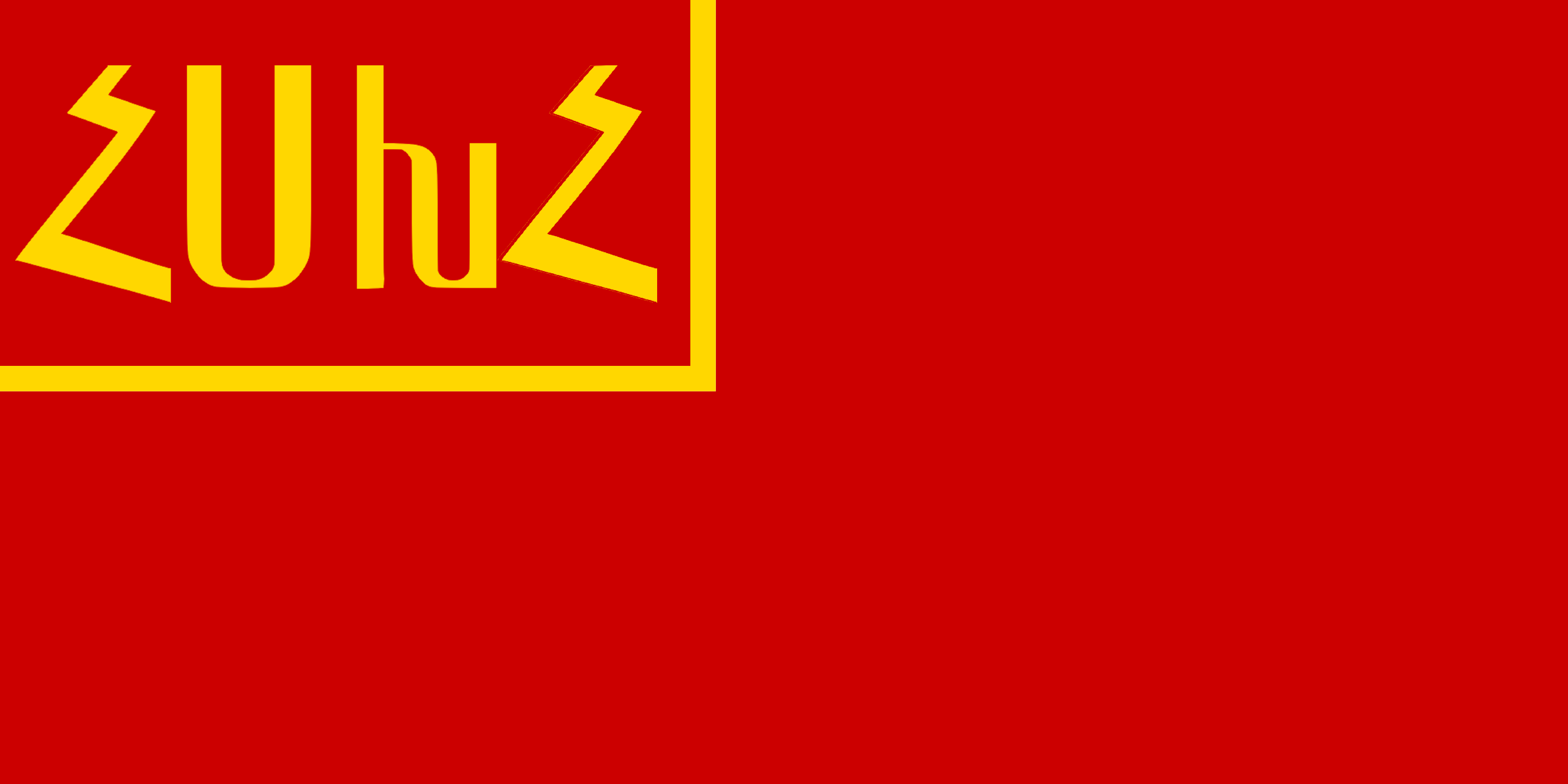
1921 - 1922

1922

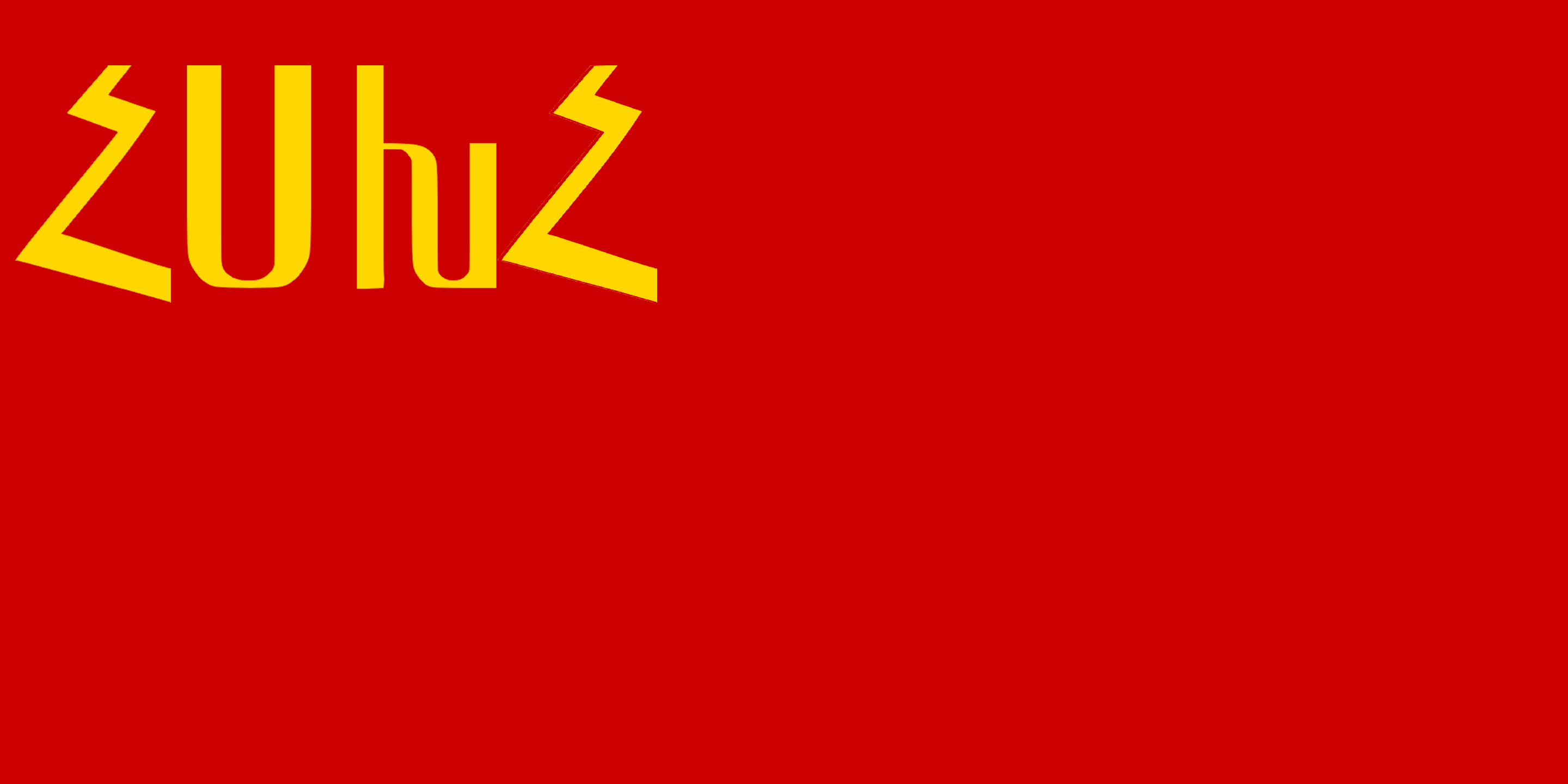
1922 - 1937

1936 - 1940

1940 - 1952

== See also ==
- Flag of the Soviet Union
- Flag of Armenia
- Coat of arms of the Armenian SSR
