= List of Armenian Heroes of the Soviet Union =

This article contains a list of recipients of the title Hero of the Soviet Union who were of Armenian ethnicity. At all from all Soviet Union the titles of Hero of the Soviet Union were awarded 107 soldiers and officers of armenian nationality.

- Gazaros Avakyan
- Grant Avakyan
- Hunan Avetisyan
- Temik Avtandylyan
- Goga Agamirov
- Grigory Ayrapetyan
- Armen Ayriev
- Georgy Akopyants
- Ruben Akopyan
- Ashot Amatuni
- Avak Antinyan
- Suren Arakelyan
- Guren Arzumanov
- Georgy Arustamov
- Aydin Arutyunyan
- Ashot Asriyan
- Eduard Ayanyan
- Hamazasp Babadzhanian
- Agvan Babyan
- Hmayak Babayan
- Grant Babayan
- Semyon Bagdasaryan
- Ruben Bagirov
- Ivan Bagramyan
- Grigory Bagyan
- Garegin Balayan
- Miran Bastandzhyan
- Sergey Burnazyan
- Vachagan Vantsyan
- Garnik Vartumyan
- Gevork Vartanyan
- Yervand Garanyan
- Sergey Grigoryan
- Yeremy Danilyants
- Levon Darbinyan
- Nshan Darbinyan
- Tatevos Yegiazaryan
- Eduard Yelyan
- Vaginak Zakharyan
- Vladimir Ionosyan
- Ivan Isakov
- Liparit Israelyan
- Ashot Kazaryan
- Hamayak Kazaryan
- Andranik Kazaryan
- Ashkharbek Kazaryan
- Grigory Kalustov
- Rafail Kaprelyan
- Askanaz Karapetyan
- Gurgen Karapetyan
- Jahan Karakhanyan
- Ashot Kasparov
- Suren Kasparyan
- Garush Konstantinov
- Vayk Levonyan
- Ghukas Madoyan
- Isak Manasyan
- Akop Manukyan
- Sarkis Martirosyan
- Arutyun Meletyan
- Khachatur Melikyan
- Andrey Melkonyan
- Gedeon Mikaelyan
- Stepan Mikoyan
- Samson Mkrtumov
- Arutyun Mkrtchyan
- Aleksandr Mnatsakanov
- Andranik Muradyan
- Aleksandr Murdugov
- Martiros Nagulyan
- Konstantin Nazarov
- Vazgen Oganesov
- Grant Oganyants
- Mikhail Parsegov
- Suren Petrosyan
- Aramais Pogosyan
- Apoven Rostomyan
- Vardkes Rustamyan
- Ishkan Saribekyan
- Armais Sarkisov
- Fyodor Sarkisov
- Vasily Sarkisyan
- Suren Sarkisyan
- Aram Safarov
- Karapet Simonyan
- Hamayak Snoplyan
- Vladimir Tambiev
- Arsen Ter-Oganov
- Horen Hachatryan
- Arutyun Chakryan
- Lazar Chapchakhov
- Saribek Chilingaryan
- Mikhail Shalzhiyan
- Ivan Shaumyan
- Vladimir Yavrumov
- David Yazydzhan
