= Armenian Soviet Socialist Republic =

Soviet republic from 1920 to 1991

Coordinates: 40.23°N 44.57°E

Armenian Soviet Socialist Republic (Note: Historical names: 1920-1936: Socialist Soviet Republic of Armenia (Armenian: Հայաստանի Սոցիալիստական Խորհրդային Հանրապետություն Russian: Социалистическая Советская Республика Армения)) (1920–1922) (1936–1990) Հայկական Սովետական Սոցիալիստական Հանրապետություն (Armenian) Армянская Советская Социалистическая Республика (Russian) Republic of Armenia (1990–1991) Հայաստանի Հանրապետություն (Armenian) Республика Армения (Russian)
- 1920–1991 (Note: Part of the Transcaucasian Socialist Federative Soviet Republic from 1922–1936.)
- Flag (1952–1990) State emblem (1937–1991)
- Motto: Պրոլետարներ բոլոր երկրների, միացե՜ք (Armenian); Proletarner bolor erkrneri, miac'ek' (transliteration) "Proletarians of all countries, unite!"
- Anthem: Հայկական Սովետական Սոցիալիստական Հանրապետություն օրհներգ Haykakan Sovetakan Soc'ialistakan Hanrapetut'yun òrhnerg "Anthem of the Armenian Soviet Socialist Republic" (1944–1991)
- Location of Armenia (red) within the Soviet Union
- Status: 1920–1922: Independent state 1922–1936: Part of the Transcaucasian SFSR; 1936–1990: Union republic of the Soviet Union; 1990–1991: Union Republic with priority of the Armenian legislation September–December 1991: De facto independent state
- Capital and largest city: Yerevan
- Official languages: Armenian (state language); Russian (official)
- Religion: Secular state (de jure); State atheism (de facto); Armenian Apostolic (majority)
- Demonyms: Armenian; Soviet
- Government: 1920–1990: Unitary communist state; 1990–1991: Unitary parliamentary republic; November–December 1991: Unitary semi-presidential republic
- First Secretary
  - 1920–1921 (first): Gevorg Alikhanyan
  - 1990 (last) (Note: On 4 August 1990, article 6 on the monopoly of the Communist Party of Armenia on power was excluded from the Constitution of the Armenian SSR.): Vladimir Movsisyan
- Head of state
  - 1920–1921 (first): Sarkis Kasyan
  - 1990–1991 (last): Levon Ter-Petrosyan
- Head of government
  - 1921–1922 (first): Alexander Miasnikian
  - 1991 (last): Gagik Harutyunyan
- Legislature: Supreme Soviet
- History
  - Republic proclaimed: 29 November 1920
  - Becomes part of the Transcaucasian SFSR: 30 December 1922
  - Re-established: 5 December 1936
  - Karabakh movement: 13 February 1988
  - Independence declared, Renamed Republic of Armenia: 23 August 1990
  - Independence referendum: 21 September 1991
  - Independence recognized: 26 December 1991
  - Soviet government abolished: 5 July 1995

Population
  - 1989 census: 3,287,677
- HDI (1991): 0.648 medium
- Currency: Soviet ruble (Rbl) (SUR)
- Calling code: +7 885
Preceded by
1920: First Republic of Armenia
1921: Republic of Mountainous Armenia
1936: Transcaucasian Socialist Federative Soviet Republic
Succeeded by
1922: Transcaucasian Socialist Federative Soviet Republic
1991: Armenia
- Today part of: Armenia

The Armenian Soviet Socialist Republic (ArSSR), (Note: Armenian SSR: Armenian: Հայկական Սովետական Սոցիալիստական Հանրապետություն, romanized: Haykakan Sovetakan Socʼialistakan Hanrapetutʼyun, IPA: [hɑjkɑˈkɑn sovetɑˈkɑn sot͡sʰiɑlistɑˈkɑn hɑnɾɑpetuˈtʰjun]; Russian: Армянская Советская Социалистическая Республика, romanized: Armyanskaya Sovetskaya Sotsialisticheskaya Respublika, IPA: [ɐrˈmʲanskəjə sɐˈvʲetskəjə sətsɨəlʲɪˈsʲtʲitɕɪskəjə rʲɪˈspublʲɪkə]) also known as the Armenian SSR, Soviet Armenia, (Note: Armenian: Սովետական Հայաստան, romanized: Sovetakan Hayastan; Russian: Советская Армения, romanized: Sovetskaya Armeniya) or simply Armenia, (Note: /ɑːrˈmiːniə/; Armenian: Հայաստան, romanized: Hayastan, IPA: [hɑjɑsˈtɑn]; (Note: Standard pronunciation is in Eastern Armenian ([hɑjɑsˈtɑn]). Western Armenian: [hɑjɑsˈdɑn].) Russian: Армения, romanized: Armeniya, IPA: [ɐrˈmʲenʲɪjə]) was one of the constituent republics of the Soviet Union, located in the Caucasus region of Eurasia. Soviet Armenia bordered the Soviet republics of Azerbaijan and Georgia and the independent states of Iran and Turkey. The capital of the republic was Yerevan, and it contained 37 districts (raions). Other major cities in the Armenian SSR included Leninakan, Kirovakan, Hrazdan, Ejmiatsin, and Kapan. The republic was governed by Communist Party of Armenia, a branch of the Communist Party of the Soviet Union.

Soviet Armenia was established on 29 November 1920, with the Sovietisation of the short-lived First Republic of Armenia. Consequently, historians refer to it as the Second Republic of Armenia. It became part of the Transcaucasian Socialist Federative Soviet Republic (TSFSR) along with neighboring Georgia and Azerbaijan, which comprised one of the four founding republics of the Soviet Union. When the TSFSR was dissolved in 1936, Armenia became a constituent republic of the Soviet Union.

As part of the Soviet Union, Armenia experienced stabilization and security from hostile neighbors as well as notable economic, cultural, and educational advancements. During its 71-year history, the republic was transformed from a largely agricultural hinterland to an important industrial production center, while its population almost quadrupled from around 880,000 in 1926 to 3.3 million in 1989 due to natural growth and large-scale influx of Armenian genocide survivors and their descendants.

Soviet Armenia flourished during Vladimir Lenin's New Economic Policy, but suffered during the Great Purge of Joseph Stalin. The republic contributed significantly to the Soviet victory in the Great Patriotic War and experienced a period of liberalization under Nikita Khrushchev's Thaw. Following the Brezhnev era, Mikhail Gorbachev's reforms of glasnost and perestroika saw the rise of the Karabakh movement in 1988. Local authorities declared state sovereignty on 23 August 1990 and boycotted the March 1991 referendum on the New Union Treaty. An independence referendum held on 21 September 1991 was supported by more than 99% of voters. With the dissolution of the Soviet Union on 26 December 1991, the Armenian SSR ceased to exist, and Armenia became an independent state.

== Formal name ==
Following the Sovietization of Armenia, the republic became officially known as the Socialist Soviet Republic of Armenia. After the dissolution of the TSFSR in 1936, the name was changed to the Armenian Soviet Socialist Republic, which was used until 1991.

In Armenian, the official name had been variously changed since the creation of the ArSSR. It was initially "Hayastani Socʼialistakan Xorhrdayin Hanrapetutʼyun" (Հայաստանի Սոցիալիստական Խորհրդային Հանրապետություն, Socialist Soviet Republic of Armenia). The second name, in accordance to the then latest Soviet Constitution, was adopted on 5 December 1936 as Haykakan Xorhrdayin Socʻialistakan Hanrapetutʻyun (Հայկական խորհրդային Սոցիալիստական Հանրապետություն, Armenian Soviet Socialist Republic), with the term haykakan (հայկական, "Armenian") replacing Hayastani (Հայաստան, "Armenia"), and transposing the second (սոցիալիստական, socialist) and third (Խորհրդային, soviet) words. It was ratified by the ninth All-Armenian Extraordinary Congress of Soviets on 23 March 1937.

Thereafter, direct borrowings of soviet (սովետական, sovetakan) and republic (ռեսպուբլիկա, ṙespublika) were included in the formal name on 22 August 1940, in accordance with a regulation approved by the People's Commissariat of Enlightenment of the Armenian SSR. In 1966, the original term for republic was restored.

On 25 June 1989, the Supreme Council of the Armenian SSR passed the bill that constitutionally restored the 1936 name, as well as in other legislative acts. After declaring the sovereign polity, the Supreme Council adopted the Declaration of Independence in which the formal name was declared Hayastani Hanrapetut'yun (Հայաստանի Հանրապետություն, Republic of Armenia) on 23 August 1990.

== History ==
=== Background ===
Prior to the Soviet era, Eastern Armenia had been part of the Russian Empire since the 1813 Treaty of Gulistan and 1828 Treaty of Turkmenchay. Marxism did not emerge among Armenian intellectuals until the end of the 19th century and eventually developed into the Union of Armenian Social Democrats, co-founded by Stepan Shaumian in Tiflis in 1902. However, it remained a minority movement until 1917.

After the October Revolution, the Bolshevik government led by Vladimir Lenin announced that non-Russian nationalities could pursue a course of self-determination, and in April 1918, the major national groups of Russian Transcaucasia declared independence as the Transcaucasian Democratic Federative Republic. By May 1918, this entity split into three independent states: the Democratic Republic of Georgia, the Azerbaijan Democratic Republic, and the First Republic of Armenia. The latter was governed by the Armenian Revolutionary Federation (ARF, Dashnaksutiun) and suffered from major socioeconomic difficulties, including a large population of refugees from the 1915 Armenian genocide.

=== Sovietization ===
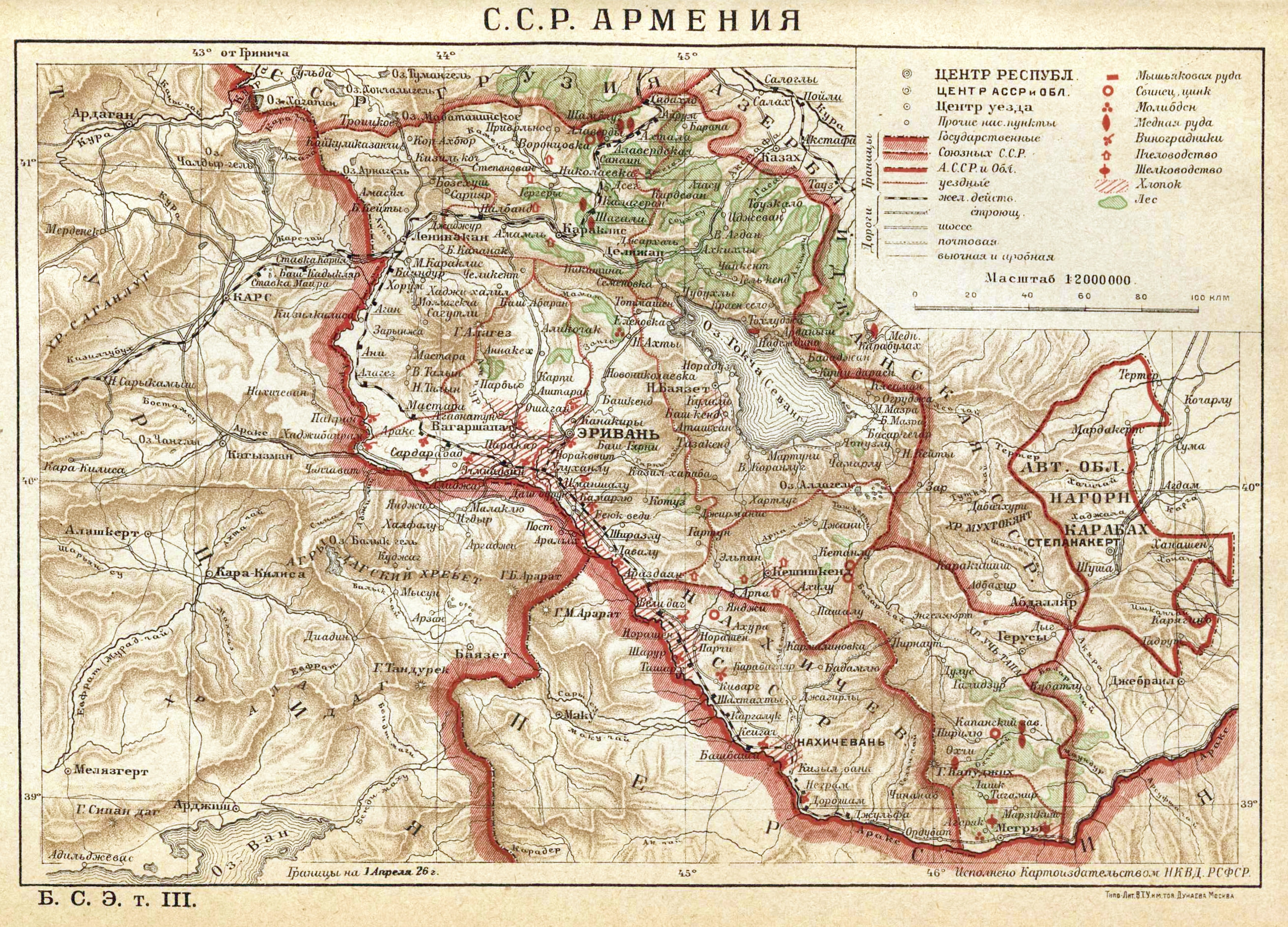
Map of Soviet Armenia and the Nagorno-Karabakh Autonomous Oblast in 1926

By April 1920, the Red Army had gained the upper-hand in the Russian Civil War and overthrew the Azerbaijan Republic, thus establishing Soviet Azerbaijan. Azerbaijan's Sovietization had a "strong ripple effect in Transcaucasia and emboldened the Bolsheviks of Armenia to unfurl the flag of revolt." Although a minority, the Armenian Bolsheviks were vocal and persuasively appealed to the severe socioeconomic situation in the country. In May 1920, they led an uprising at Alexandropol, then the largest city in Eastern Armenia, demanding the establishment of a Soviet republic. The revolt was violently suppressed by the Armenian government, with its leaders executed or exiled.

By September 1920, Turkish forces had invaded Armenia and soon recaptured most of the historical Armenian territories that the Ottomans controlled before 1878. Concerned by the rapid advance of the Turkish nationalists, the Bolshevik government in Moscow approached Yerevan and offered to intervene on its behalf. However, "the Turks rejected any Russian interference." By the end of November, the 11th Red Army had entered the Armenian republic and announced that "Armenia's salvation lay in becoming a Bolshevik state" and "cutting its ties to the West." Faced with a dire situation, the Yerevan government instructed Alexander Khatisian to open talks with the Turks at Alexandropol and to appoint a team headed by General Drastamat Kanayan to transfer political power to the Bolsheviks.

On 2 December, Yerevan signed a short-lived pact with Moscow, securing Armenian statehood as a Soviet republic. The Bolsheviks promised to "restore Armenia's pre-September 1920 borders" and to grant amnesty to Dashnak and non-Dashnak officials. A few days later, however, the Armenian Bolshevik Revkom, led by Sarkis Kasyan and Avis Nurijanyan, arrived in Yerevan with the Red Army. Violating the agreement, they arrested several Dashnak leaders and "wreaked havoc for the next two months."

The war communism policies of the Armenian Revkom were implemented in a high-handed manner and failed to take into account the poor conditions of the republic and the general exhaustion of the population after years of conflict and civil strife. As the Soviet Armenian historian Bagrat Borian wrote in 1929, the Revkom engaged in "a series of indiscriminate seizures and confiscations, without regard to class, and without taking into account the general economic and psychological state of the peasantry." Such was the degree of the requisitioning and terror imposed by the local Cheka that in February 1921 the Armenians, led by the former leaders of the First Republic, rose up in revolt and briefly unseated the new Soviet government in Yerevan. The Red Army, which was campaigning in Georgia at the time, had to return to suppress the revolt.

=== New Economic Policy ===
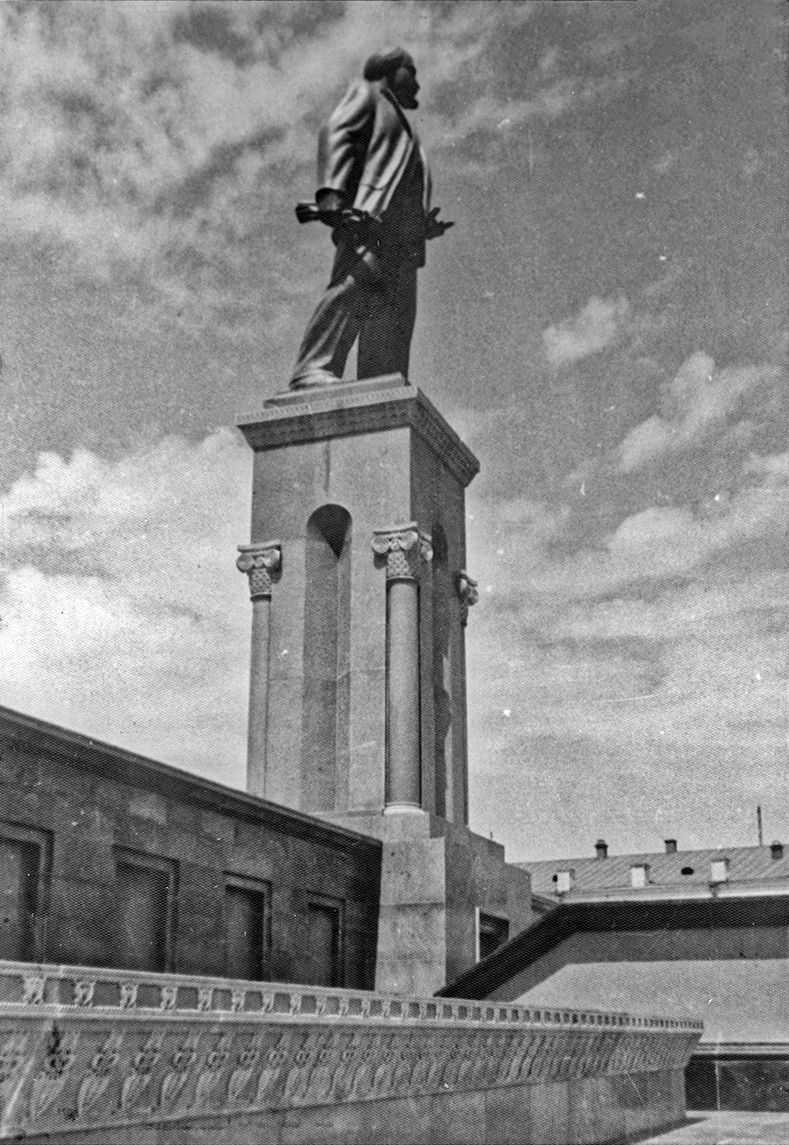
Lenin Monument on Yerevan's Lenin Square (today Republic Square)

Convinced that the heavy-handed tactics of the Revkom were the source of popular discontent in Armenia, in 1921, Lenin appointed Alexander Miasnikian, an experienced administrator, to carry out a more moderate policy and one better attuned to Armenian national sensibilities. With the introduction of the New Economic Policy (NEP), Armenians began to enjoy a period of relative stability in contrast to the turbulent years of the First Republic. Alexander Tamanian began to realize his city plan for Yerevan, and the population received medicine, food, as well as other provisions from Moscow. Garegin Nzhdeh's anti-Soviet rebellion, centered on mountainous Zangezur, was defeated and its leaders were driven out of Armenia, across the Araks River into Iran on 15 July 1921.

From March 1922 to December 1936, Soviet Armenia formed part of the Transcaucasian SFSR (TSFSR), together with Soviet Georgia and Soviet Azerbaijan. In 1921, one year before the founding of the TSFSR, Moscow had finalized negotiations with Turkey over the borders of Transcaucasia. In the Treaty of Moscow and the Treaty of Kars, Turkey renounced its claims on Batumi to Georgia in exchange for the Armenian regions of Kars, Ardahan, and Surmalu, all of which had been under Turkish military control since the Turkish invasion of Armenia in 1920. The treaties also granted the district of Nakhichevan to Soviet Azerbaijan as an autonomous republic.

The territory ceded to Turkey included the medieval Armenian capital Ani and Mount Ararat, the national symbol of the Armenian people. During the Kars negotiations, the Soviet side "attempted to retain at least Ani and a concession on the salt-mining town of Koghb, in Surmalu, for Soviet Armenia." However, Turkey rejected any border changes, "much to the disappointment of the Soviet side." Earlier, during the talks at Alexandropol, Alexander Khatisian also tried to convince the Turkish Nationalists to leave Ani and Surmalu within Armenia, but in vain.

Additionally, despite opposition from Miasnikian, the Soviet Kavbiuro granted majority-Armenian Nagorno-Karabakh to Soviet Azerbaijan in July 1921, as the Bolsheviks did not have direct control over the region at the time and were primarily concerned with restoring regional stability. In his speech at the First Congress of the Armenian Communist Party in January 1922, Miasnikian further divulged that "Baku had threatened to halt kerosene supplies to Armenia if Yerevan did not relinquish its claims to Mountainous Karabakh."

Prior to his debilitating illness, Lenin encouraged the policy of korenizatsiya or "nativization" in the republics which essentially called for the different nationalities of the Soviet Union to "administer their republics", establishing native-language schools, newspapers, and theaters. In Armenia, the Soviet government directed all illiterate citizens up to the age of 50 to attend school and learn to read Armenian, which became the official language of the republic. The local government also implemented an orthography reform to facilitate the growth of literacy. Throughout the Soviet era, the number of Armenian-language newspapers (Sovetakan Hayastan), magazines (Garun), and journals (Sovetakan Grakanutyun, Patma-Banasirakan Handes) grew significantly. A Kurdish newspaper, Ria Taza (The New Path), was established in Armenia in 1930.

The NEP period saw a cultural revival in Armenia. An institute for culture and history was created in 1921 at Ejmiatsin, and the Yerevan Opera Theatre and a dramatic theater in Yerevan were built and established in the 1920s and 1930s. Popular works in the fields of art and literature were produced by Martiros Saryan, Yeghishe Charents, Axel Bakunts, Avetik Isahakyan, and Shushanik Kurghinian, all of whom adhered to the Soviet dictum of creating works "national in form, socialist in content." Armenkino released the first Armenian feature film, Namus (Honor) in 1925 and the first Kurdish film, Zare, in 1926. Both were directed by Hamo Beknazarian, who would later direct the first Armenian sound film Pepo, released in 1935.

The Armenian diaspora was divided about the new Soviet government in Yerevan. Supporters of the Dashnaksutiun continued to oppose the Bolsheviks and refused to support Soviet Armenia. By contrast, supporters of the Armenian General Benevolent Union (AGBU) were more accepting of the newly founded Soviet republic.

=== Stalinism and the Great Purge ===
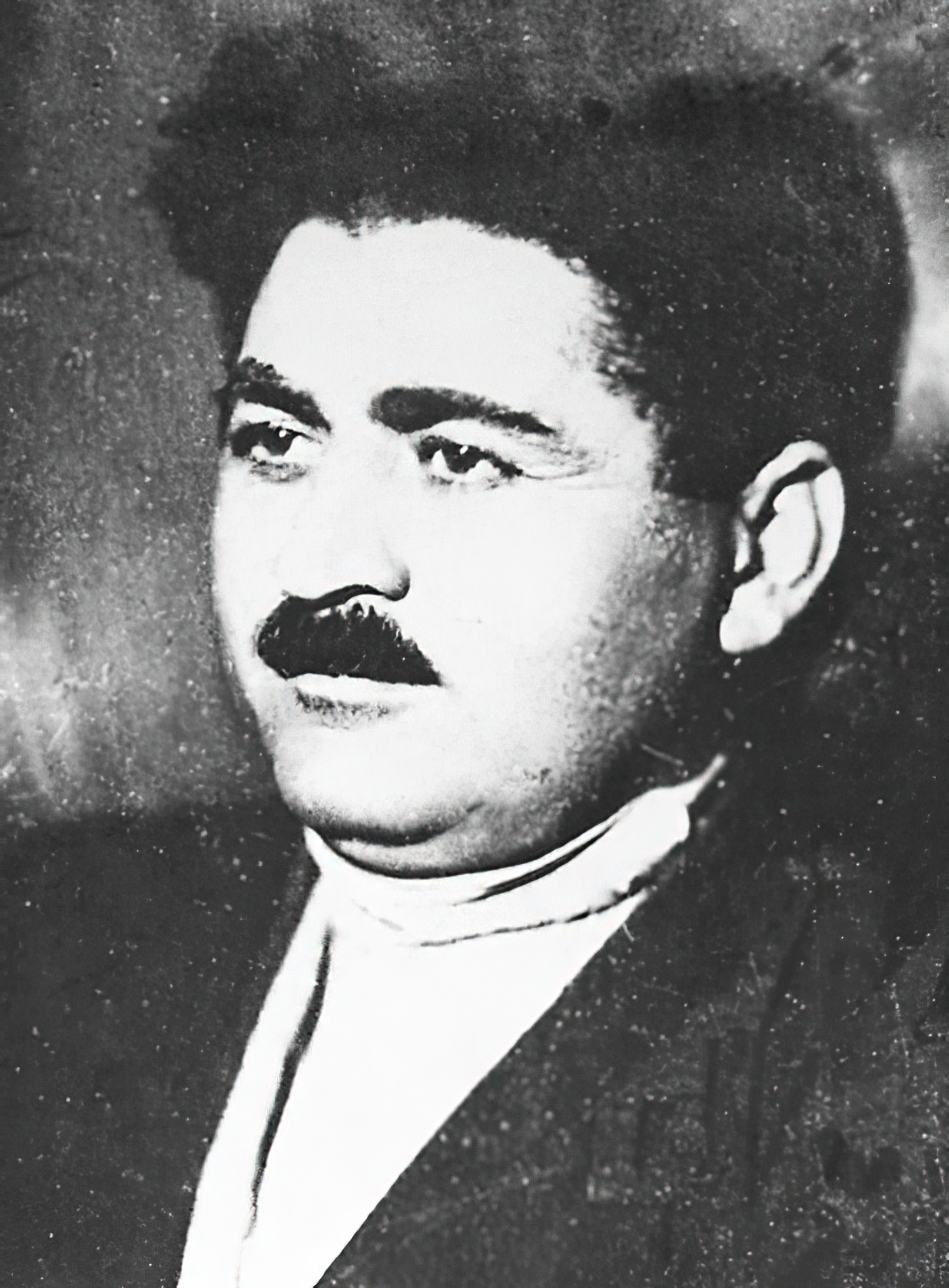
First Secretary Aghasi Khanjian, a native of Van, was killed in 1936 by Lavrentiy Beria

The situation in Armenia and the USSR significantly changed after the death of Lenin and the rise of Joseph Stalin to the Soviet leadership. Under Stalin, privately owned farms in Armenia were forcibly collectivized and placed under the directive of the state, a move that was met with resistance from the peasantry, especially in the mountainous regions of Lori, Daralagiaz, and Zangezur. Politically, Stalin's ally in Georgia, Lavrentiy Beria, sought to consolidate his control over the Caucasus, resulting in a power struggle with Armenian First Secretary Aghasi Khanjian. The struggle culminated in Khanjian's assassination by Beria in Tiflis (Tbilisi) on 9 July 1936, beginning the Great Purge in Armenia. At first, Beria framed Khanjian's death as "suicide," but soon condemned him for abetting "rabid nationalist elements among the Armenian intelligentsia."

After Khanjian's death, Beria promoted his loyalists in Armenia—Amatuni Amatuni as Armenian First Secretary and Khachik Mughdusi [hy] as chief of the Armenian NKVD. Under the command of Beria's allies, the campaign against "enemies" intensified. Expressions of "nationalism" were suspect, and many leading Armenian intellectuals were arrested, including Charents, Bakunts, Vahan Totovents, Zabel Yesayan, Nersik Stepanyan [hy], and others. According to Amatuni in a June 1937 letter to Stalin, 1,365 people were arrested in the ten months after the death of Khanjian, among them 900 "Dashnak-Trotskiites."

The death of Sahak Ter-Gabrielyan in August 1937 was a turning point in the repressions. While being interrogated by Mughdusi's men, Ter-Gabrielyan "either jumped or was pushed from the third-floor window" of the NKVD building in Yerevan. Stalin was angered that Mughdusi and Amatuni neglected to inform him about the incident. In response, in September 1937, he sent Georgy Malenkov, Mikhail Litvin [ru], and later Anastas Mikoyan to oversee a purge of the Communist Party of Armenia. During the trip, Mikoyan tried, but failed, to save one individual (Danush Shahverdyan) from the repressions. More than a thousand people were arrested and seven of nine members of the Armenian Politburo were sacked from office. The trip also resulted in the appointment of a new Armenian Party leadership, headed by Grigory Arutinov, who was approved by Beria.

The Armenian Apostolic Church was not spared from the repressions. Soviet attacks against the Church under Stalin were known since 1929, but momentarily eased to improve the Soviet Union's relations with the Armenian diaspora. In 1932, Khoren I became Catholicos of All Armenians and assumed the leadership of the Church. However, in the late 1930s, the Armenian NKVD, led by Mughdusi and his successor Viktor Khvorostyan [ru], renewed the attacks against the Church. These attacks culminated in the 1938 murder of Khoren and the closing of the Catholicate of Ejmiatsin, an act for which Beria is usually held responsible. However, the Church survived and was later revived when Stalin eased restrictions on religion at the end of World War II.

=== Great Patriotic War ===
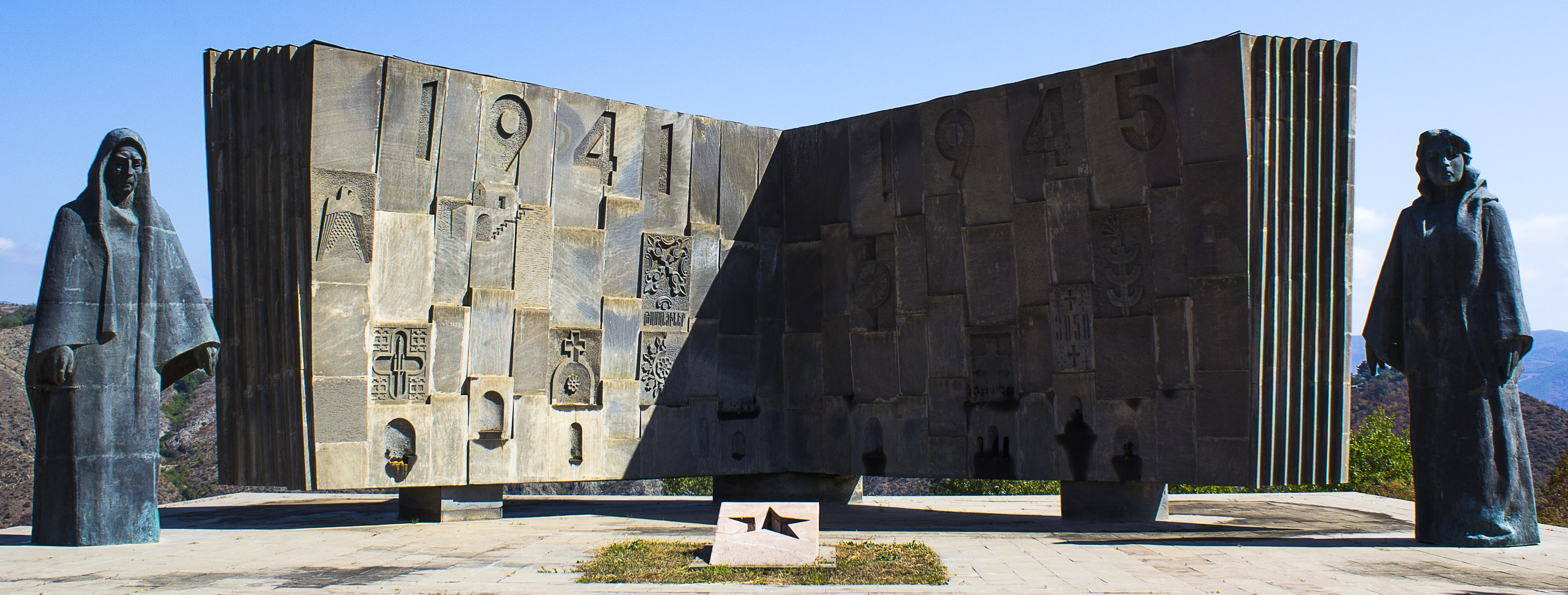
Great Patriotic War memorial near Kapan

Armenia was spared the devastation and destruction that wrought most of the western Soviet Union during the Great Patriotic War of World War II. The Wehrmacht never reached the South Caucasus, which they intended to do in order to capture the oil fields of Baku. Still, Armenia played a valuable role in the war in providing food, manpower, and war material. An estimated 300–500,000 Armenians served in the war, almost half of whom did not return. Many attained the highest honor of Hero of the Soviet Union. Over 60 Armenians were promoted to the rank of general, while one attained the rank of Admiral (Ivan Isakov) and three achieved the rank of Marshal of the Soviet Union (Ivan Bagramyan, Hamazasp Babadzhanian, and Sergei Khudyakov). Additionally, aircraft designer Artem Mikoyan, the brother of Anastas, co-founded the Soviet MiG fighter jet design bureau.

In an effort to shore up popular support for the war effort, the Soviet government allowed certain expressions of nationalism with the publication of Armenian novels such as Derenik Demirchian's Vardanank, the production of films like David Bek (1944), and the easing of restrictions placed against the Church. Stalin temporarily relaxed his attacks on religion during the war. This led to the election of bishop Gevorg in 1945 as Catholicos Gevorg VI. He was subsequently allowed to reside at Ejmiatsin.

At the end of the war, after the capitulation of Nazi Germany, the Soviet government attempted to annul the Treaty of Kars, allowing it to regain the provinces of Kars, Ardahan, Artvin, and Surmalu. On 7 June 1945, Soviet Foreign Minister Vyacheslav Molotov informed the Turkish ambassador in Moscow that the disputed provinces should be returned to Soviet Union in the name of both the Armenian and Georgian Soviet Republics. Turkey was in no condition to fight a war with the Soviet Union, which had emerged as a superpower after the Second World War. The Soviet territorial claims were supported by the Armenian Catholicos and by all shades of the Armenian diaspora, including the anti-Soviet Dashnaksutiun. However, with the onset of the Cold War, especially the Truman Doctrine in 1947, Turkey strengthened its ties with the West. The Soviet Union relinquished its claims over the lost territories, and Ankara joined the anti-Soviet NATO military alliance in 1952.

=== Armenian repatriation ===
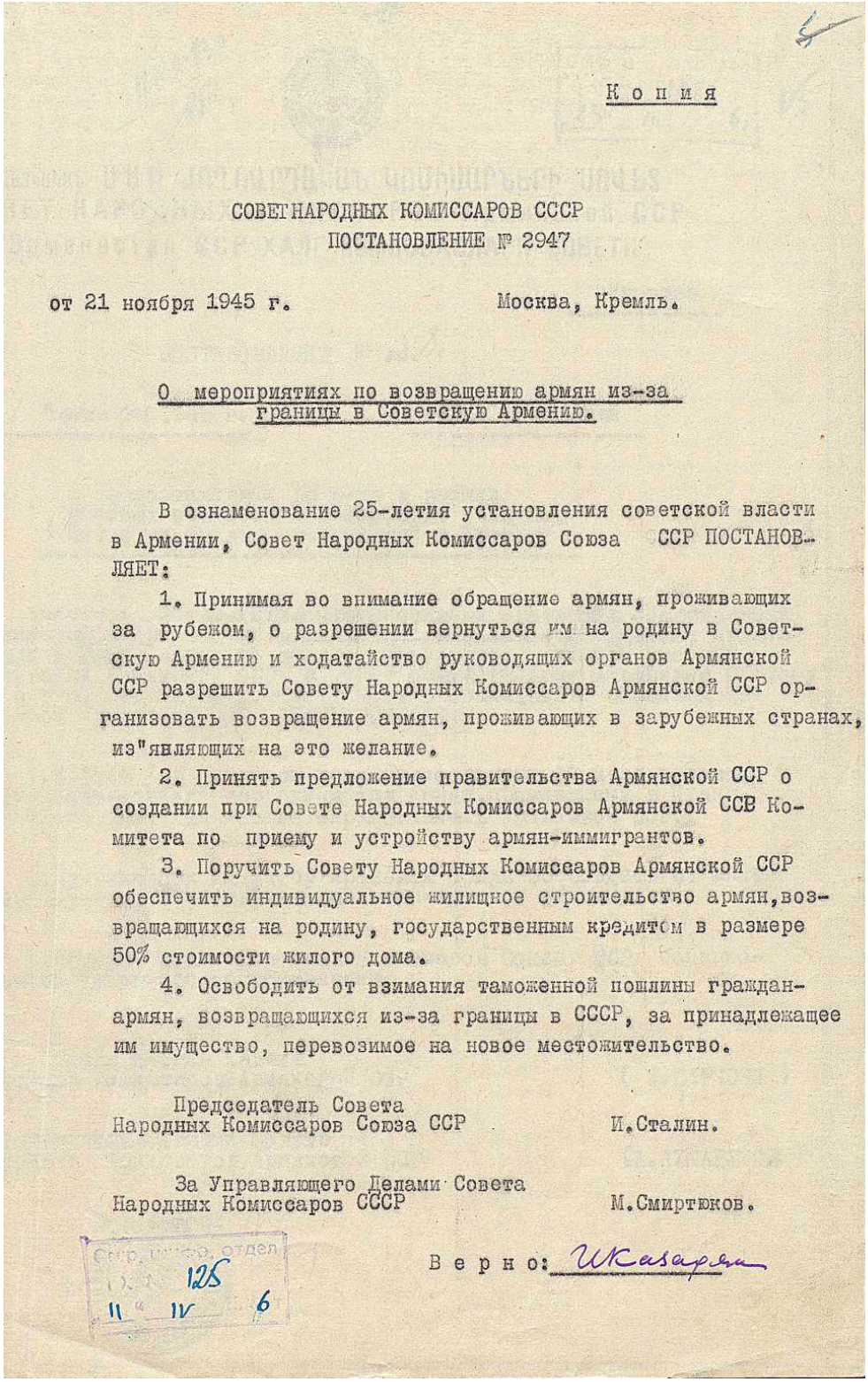
1945 decree signed by Stalin on the repatriation of Armenian diasporans to Soviet Armenia

With the republic suffering heavy losses after the war, Stalin allowed an open immigration policy in Armenia; the diaspora were encouraged to repatriate to Armenia (nergaght) and revitalize the population and bolster the workforce. Armenians living in countries such as Cyprus, France, Greece, Iraq, Lebanon, and Syria were primarily the survivors or the descendants of the genocide. Offered an expenses paid return, an estimated 150,000 Armenians arrived in Soviet Armenia between 1946 and 1948, settling in Yerevan, Leninakan, Kirovakan, and other towns.

Lured by numerous incentives such as food coupons, better housing and other benefits, they were received coldly by many Armenians living in the republic upon their arrival. The repatriates spoke the standardized Western Armenian dialect, instead of the Eastern Armenian prevalent in Soviet Armenia. They were often addressed as aghbars ("brothers") by Armenians living in the republic, due to their different pronunciation of the word. Initially humorous in tone, its usage evolved and began to carry a more pejorative connotation.

Thousands of Armenians were forcibly exiled to the Altai Krai in 1949. Many were repatriated Armenians who had arrived from the Armenian diaspora but who were suspected of being Dashnak party members. Repatriates such as Lazare Indjeyan and Armand Maloumian chronicled their experiences in, and eventual escapes from, the Gulag. American-Armenian repatriate, Tom Mooradian, published a memoir describing life in Soviet Armenia as a basketball player, and the challenges of adapting to life under Stalin. Other repatriates explored family memories of the 1915 genocide and their later resettlement in the Soviet Union.

=== Khrushchev Thaw ===
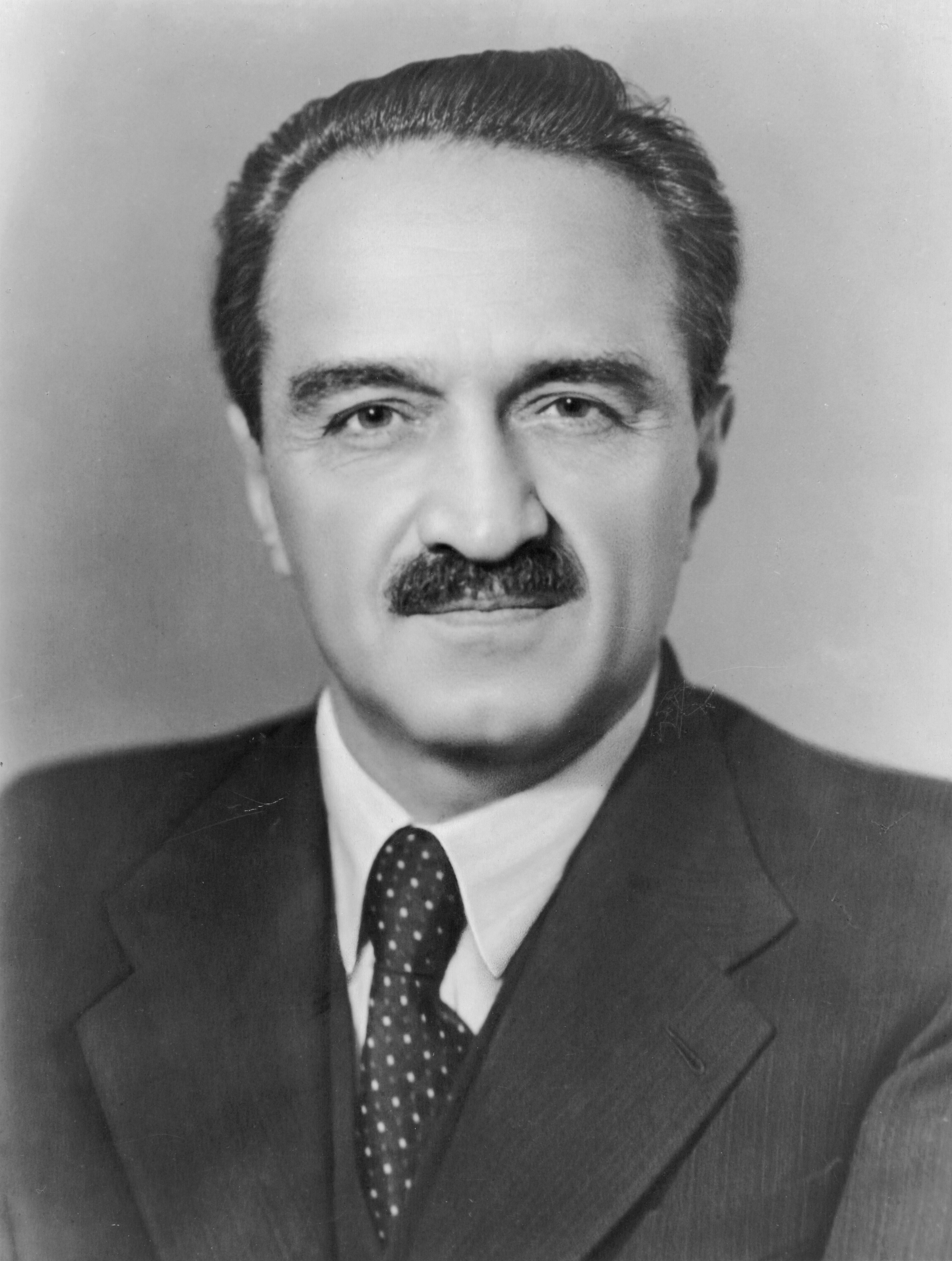
In a speech in Yerevan in 1954, Anastas Mikoyan called for the rehabilitation of Yeghishe Charents, beginning the Khrushchev Thaw in Soviet Armenia.

Armenia underwent significant social and cultural change in the aftermath of Stalin's death in 1953 and the emergence of Nikita Khrushchev as the new Soviet leader. One of Khrushchev's advisers and close friends, Armenian Politburo member Anastas Mikoyan, urged Armenians to reaffirm their national identity. On 11 March 1954, two years before Khrushchev denounced Stalin, Mikoyan gave a speech in Yerevan where he encouraged the rehabilitation of Charents, the republication of the writers Raphael Patkanian and Raffi, and the revival of the memory of Miasnikian. Behind the scenes, he personally assisted Soviet Armenian leaders in the rehabilitation of former "enemies" in the republic, such as Khanjian and Shahverdyan. Another prominent Armenian figure, Lev Shaumyan, the son of Stepan Shaumian, also played an important role in assisting Mikoyan and Khrushchev on rehabilitations.

Khrushchev, in his "Secret Speech" delivered before the 20th Party Congress in 1956, sharply denounced Stalin and his crimes. At the same congress, Armenia's new First Secretary, Suren Tovmasyan, praised Charents and "recalled the poet's quote casting Moscow as the 'center of the world.'" During the unfolding Khrushchev Thaw, the Soviet leadership loosened political restrictions and began a campaign of de-Stalinization. Thousands of political prisoners were released from the Gulag and victims of the Great Purge, such as Charents, Bakunts, and Totovents, were posthumously rehabilitated. Religious freedom, to a limited degree, was granted to Armenia when Catholicos Vazgen I assumed office in 1955. In 1962, the massive statue of Stalin that towered over Yerevan was pulled down from its pedestal by troops and replaced in 1967 with that of Mother Armenia.

Khrushchev's union-wide economic reforms, emphasizing the consumer economy, positively impacted Armenia. Mikoyan frequently advised Armenian leaders on major economic projects in the republic, such as the Arpa–Sevan tunnel. Under Stalin, hydroelectric projects had resulted in the dramatic lowering of Lake Sevan's water levels. During the Thaw, the government of Yakov Zarobyan, advised by Mikoyan, persuaded Khrushchev to support the construction of the Arpa–Sevan tunnel to save the lake.

In 1959, the Matenadaran was opened in Yerevan as an archive to house the nationalized monastic collections of Ejmiatsin, and to encourage preservation of the manuscripts and to promote historical research. The Soviet government likewise approved the creation of sculptures honoring popular Armenian figures, such as Yervand Kochar's sculpture of the Armenian folk hero David of Sassoun. Contacts between Armenia and the diaspora were revived, and Armenians from abroad were able to visit the republic more frequently. At the same time, the Armenians of the Nagorno-Karabakh Autonomous Oblast (NKAO) became more vocal about their grievences with Soviet Azerbaijan. In 1962, Karabakh Armenian residents appealed to Khrushchev, "enumerating their grievances with official Baku and requesting the transfer of their territories from the jurisdiction of Soviet Azerbaijan to that of either Soviet Armenia or the Russian SFSR."

=== Brezhnev era ===
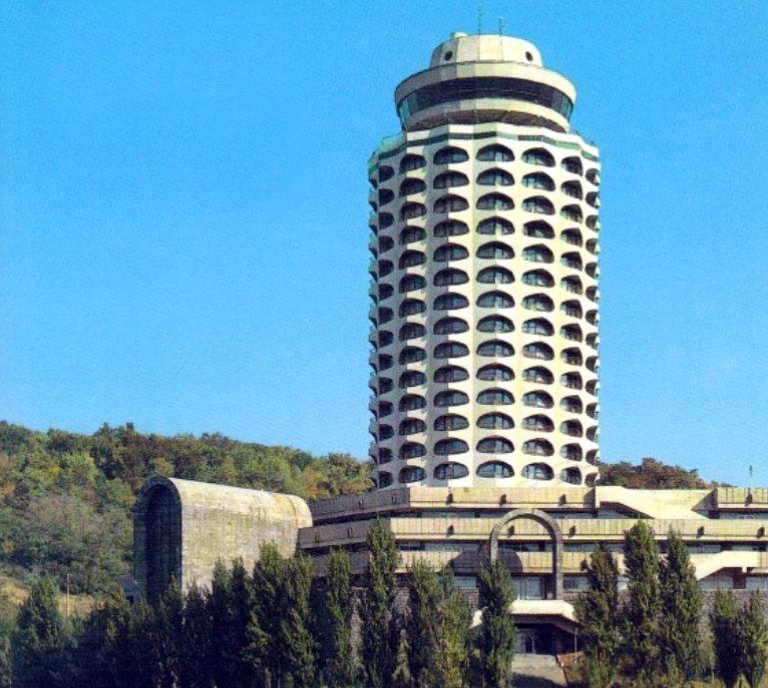
Yerevan Youth Palace

After Leonid Brezhnev assumed power in 1964, Khrushchev's reforms were partly curtailed. However, while the Soviet state remained ever wary of the potential resurgence of Armenian nationalism, it did not impose the sort of restrictions seen during Stalin's time. On 24 April 1965, thousands of Armenians demonstrated in the streets of Yerevan during the 50th anniversary of the Armenian genocide. In the aftermath of these demonstrations, the memorial in honor of the genocide victims was erected at the Tsitsernakaberd hill above the Hrazdan gorge in Yerevan in 1967.

Armenian First Secretary Anton Kochinyan sought to further accommodate Armenian national sentiments. Together with Badal Muradyan, he unsuccessfully appealed to Moscow for the unification of the NKAO with Soviet Armenia in September 1966, in response to appeals from Karabakh Armenian activists and Armenian intellectuals. Kochinyan also encouraged the construction of major national monuments, such as Rafayel Israyelian's 1968 memorial to the Battle of Sardarabad. His tenure saw the 2,750th anniversary of Yerevan, and the victory of FC Ararat Yerevan in the 1973 Top League and Soviet Cup.

During the Brezhnev years, the Soviet Union began to see the rise of corruption and shadow economy. Materials allocated for the building of new homes, such as cement and concrete, were diverted for other uses, and bribery and a lack of oversight produced shoddily built and weakly supported apartment buildings. The impact of this problem was later evidenced during the 1988 Armenian earthquake—when the earthquake hit, the Brezhnevka apartments were the most susceptible to collapse, while the older buildings better withstood the quake. When compared to other parts of the Soviet Union, the republics of Transcaucasia and Central Asia had the highest levels of corruption.

A new intelligentsia emerged in Armenia that rejected the prevailing situation, and felt that "the corruption, emigration of talented individuals, pollution and general loss of ethics" had put the republic "on the road to disaster." This sentiment resulted in the removal of First Secretary Kochinyan and the promotion of Karen Demirchyan, whose main prerogative was to "clean up the republic." Demirchyan's promises and activities raised the hopes of those Armenians who demanded concrete changes. His government undertook the battle against corruption and established major construction projects, such as the Yerevan Metro, the Karen Demirchyan Complex, and Zvartnots International Airport. However, some Armenians believed that the Demirchyan government was delivering its promises too slowly.

In 1978, amid discussion over the new Soviet constitution, Moscow considered removing the guarantee enshrining native languages as the official languages of the Caucasus republics. However, the Armenians, alongside the Georgians, fervently protested and defeated this proposal. By the time of the 1979 Soviet census, over 99% of the people of Soviet Armenia (including Kurds, Assyrians, and Azeris) "considered Armenian, rather than Russian, their national language," a much higher number compared to other republics. Additionally, one third of the Armenian population within the USSR lived outside the Armenian republic, primarily in the Georgian SSR, Azerbaijan SSR, and Russian SFSR. In the Azerbaijan SSR, the Armenians of the NKAO continued to unsuccessfully petition Moscow for unification with Soviet Armenia throughout the 1970s.

=== Glasnost and perestroika ===
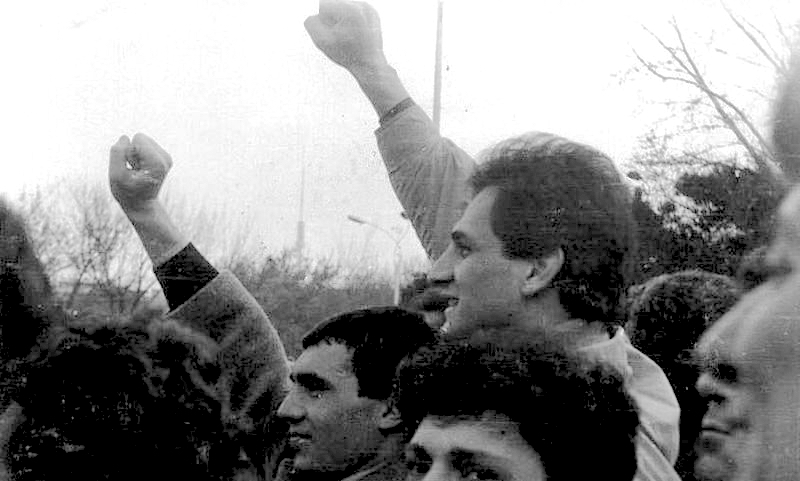
Armenians demonstrating for the unification of the NKAO with Soviet Armenia at Opera Square in Yerevan in the summer of 1988

Mikhail Gorbachev's introduction of the reforms of glasnost and perestroika in the 1980s fueled visions of a better life in the Soviet Union among Armenians. Taking advantage of the new political climate, the Armenians of the NKAO began a democratic movement to unite their region with Soviet Armenia, expressing concern about the forced "Azerification" of their native region by Baku. On 20 February 1988, the Supreme Soviet of the NKAO officially voted to unify with Armenia.

Demonstrations took place in Yerevan in support of the Karabakh Armenians and grew into what became known as the Karabakh movement. By the beginning of 1988, nearly one million Armenians from several regions of the republic engaged in these demonstrations, centered on Yerevan's Theater Square (today Freedom Square). However, in neighboring Azerbaijan, violence against Armenians erupted in the city of Sumgait. Ethnic rioting broke out between Armenians and Azeris, preventing any peaceful resolution from taking place. Armenia's problems were only compounded by the devastating earthquake of 1988 and another major anti-Armenian pogrom in Baku. Armenians became increasingly disillusioned with the Kremlin; Gorbachev, who had until then been viewed favorably in Armenia, saw his standing among Armenians deteriorate significantly.

Tension between the central government in Moscow and the local government in Yerevan heightened in the final years of the Soviet Union. The reasons largely stemmed from Moscow's perceived indecision on the Karabakh question, combined with ongoing difficulties in relief for the 1988 earthquake and general shortcomings in the Soviet economy. On 23 August 1990, the Supreme Soviet of the Armenian SSR adopted the Declaration of Independence of Armenia, declaring the Republic of Armenia to be a subject of international law. On 17 March 1991, Armenia, along with the Baltics, Georgia, and Moldavia, boycotted the union-wide referendum in which 78% of all voters voted for the retention of the Soviet Union in a reformed form. Armenia confirmed its independence in a referendum on 21 September 1991 after the unsuccessful coup attempt in Moscow by Kremlin hardliners. The republic's independence became official with the Belovezha Accords and the formal dissolution of the Soviet Union on 26 December 1991, making Armenia a sovereign, independent state. The constitution of 1978 remained in effect until July 1995, when a new constitution was adopted.

== Politics ==
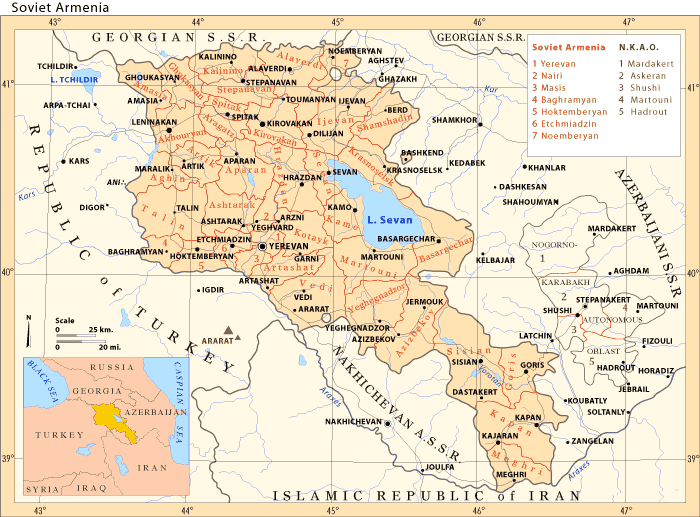
Administrative divisions of the Armenian SSR

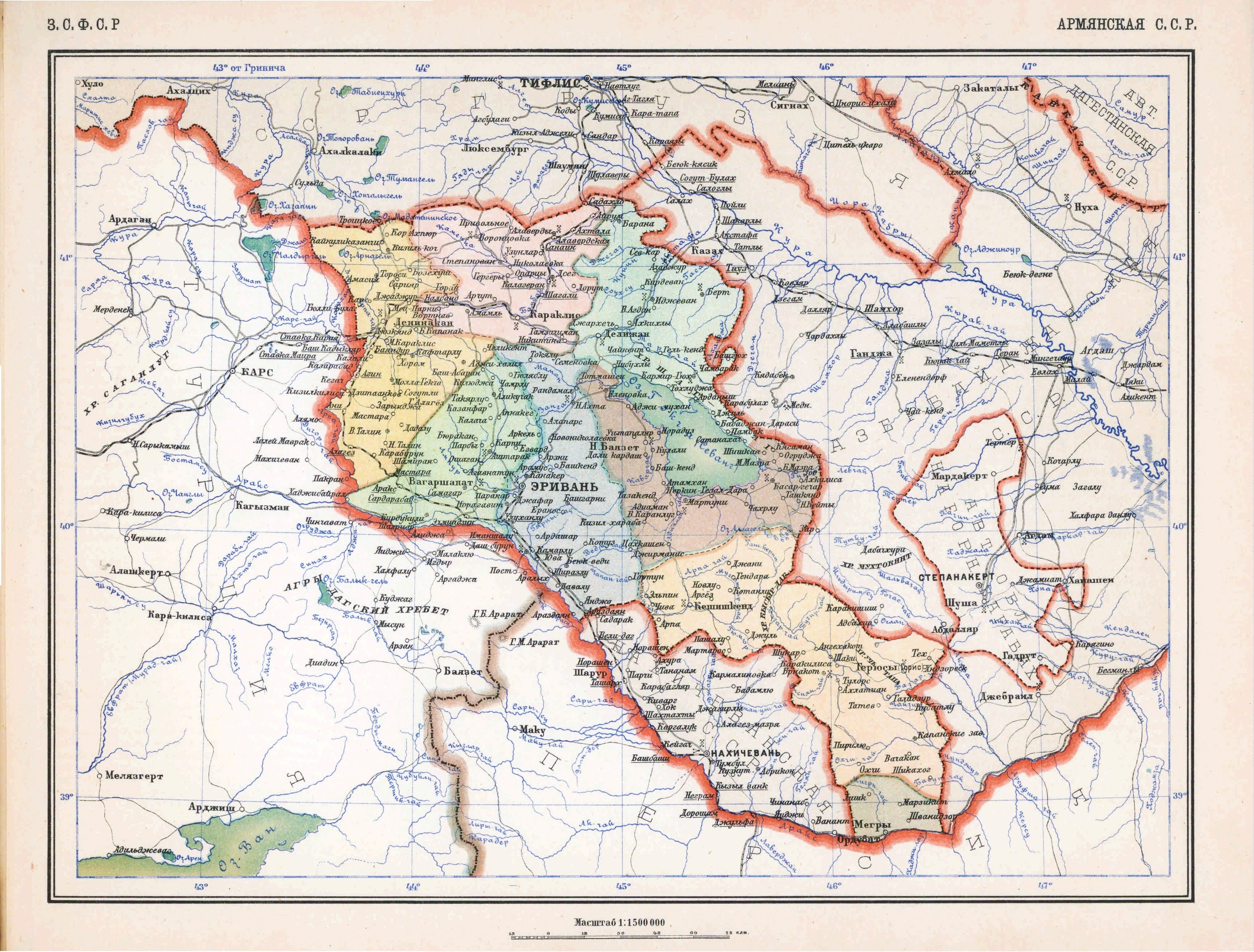
Administrative divisions of the Armenian SSR in 1928

The structure of government in the Armenian SSR was identical to that of the other Soviet republics. The First Secretary was the administrative head of the republic, and the head of government was the Chairman of the Council of Ministers. The republic's legislative body was the Armenian Supreme Soviet, which included the highest judicial branch of the republic, the supreme court. Members of the Supreme Soviet served for a term of five years, whereas regional deputies served for two and a half years. All officials holding office were mandated to be members of the Communist Party of the Soviet Union, and sessions were convened in the Supreme Soviet building in Yerevan. The administrative divisions of the Armenian SSR from 1930 consisted of up 37 raions and 22 city districts. In the aftermath of the dissolution of the Soviet Union, the districts were abolished in 1995 and replaced by larger marzer ("provinces").

Depending on the historical period, Soviet authorities would variously tolerate, co-opt, or openly attack certain currents within Armenian society, such as nationalism and religion, to strengthen the cohesiveness of the union state. In the eyes of early Soviet policymakers, Armenians, along with Russians, Ukrainians, Belarusians, Georgians, Germans, and Jews were deemed "advanced" (as opposed to "backward") peoples and were grouped together with Western nationalities. The Caucasus and particularly Armenia were recognized by academic scholars and in Soviet textbooks as the "oldest civilisation on the territory" of the Soviet Union. By the mid-1970s, Armenian nationalism had resurfaced, mostly directed against NATO member Turkey, and the Demirchyan government allowed a not-too-overt expression of it. More books were published on conditions in the NKAO and the state of historical Armenian monuments in the Nakhichevan ASSR. The "Armenian question" was "raised unofficially in some circles." Armenian Genocide Remembrance Day became officialized as an annual day of mourning.

Like all other Soviet republics, Armenia had its own flag and state emblem. In his memoirs, Khrushchev recounted that the latter became a source of dispute between the Soviet Union and Turkey when Ankara objected to the emblem's inclusion of Mount Ararat, a symbol of deep national and spiritual importance for Armenians. Turkey felt that the presence of such an image implied Soviet designs on Turkish territory, given that Ararat had been part of Turkey since 1921. According to Khrushchev, the Kremlin retorted by asking, "Why do you have a half moon depicted on your flag? After all, the moon doesn't belong to Turkey, not even half the moon. What's going on? Do you want to take over the whole universe, and did you choose the moon as a symbol of that?" Turkey dropped the issue after this.

== Economy ==
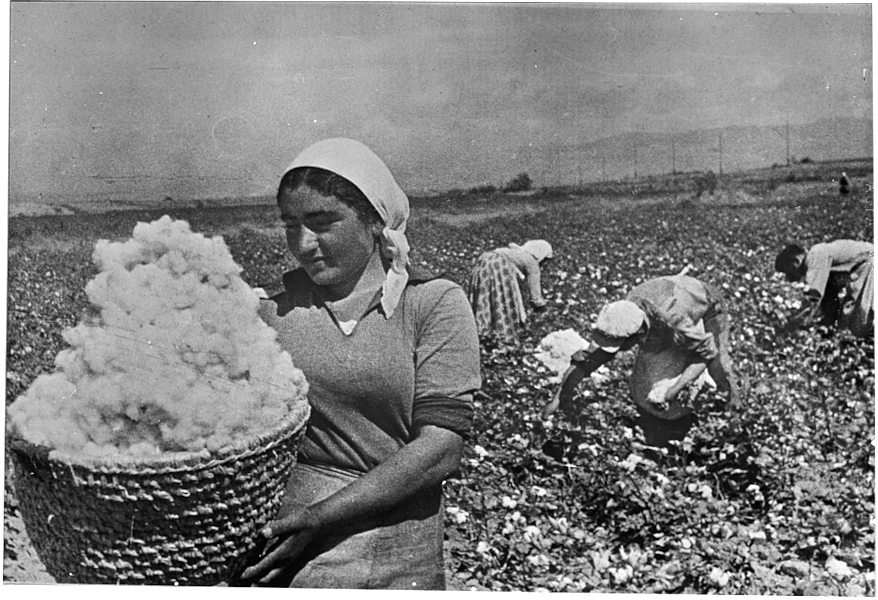
Women harvesting cotton in Soviet Armenia in the 1930s

Beginning under Stalin, Soviet Armenia operated on a planned economy, in which private property was banned. The government collectively owned the means of production, divided into state property and cooperative and collective farm property. The economic life of the republic was determined and guided by the state economic plan.

In the early years of Soviet Armenia, 80% of its population engaged in agriculture. From 1929 to 1936, the government began the process of industrialization, and by 1935, the gross product from agriculture reached the 132% and the gross product from industry reached the 650%, both compared to the production in 1928. The economic revolution of the 1930s, however, came with a cost, breaking up the traditional peasant family and village institution and compelling many living in the rural countryside to settle in urban areas. At the time of the USSR's dissolution, around 80% of Armenia's population lived in urban centers and worked in heavy industry, management, and the service sector.

During Khrushchev's secretaryship, the large collective farms were divided into smaller ones, and farmers were permitted to cultivate small plots for their own personal use. Armenia was permitted to plant other crops besides grain—including the production of tobacco, vegetables, grapes and other fruits—more suitable to Armenia's soil and climate. The newly introduced production of livestock and various irrigation projects increased Armenia's agricultural output. However, the lack of land suitable for farming meant the republic's agricultural output was less compared to other republics.

The Brezhnev era saw the rise of a prospering tourism sector, which constituted a substantial portion of Soviet Armenia's economy. Cultural exchanges were initiated and hotels and museums were opened. Metsamor Nuclear Power Plant was constructed and launched in 1976, satisfying the electricity needs of Armenia, Georgia, and Azerbaijan. During this period, while the industrial output of Armenia rose, the levels of pollution increased, which caused a growth in cancer cases and ecological problems.

== Military forces ==
The military forces of the Armenian SSR were provided by the Soviet Army's 7th Guards Combined Arms Army of the Transcaucasian Military District. It was organized into the following:

- HQ of the 7th Guards Combined Arms Army, Yerevan
- 15th Motor Rifle Division, Kirovakan
- 127th Motor Rifle Division, Leninakan (today the Russian 102nd Military Base)
- 7th Fortified Area, Leninakan – Originally formed as 55th Fortified Region on 4 February 1941 and covered Turkish border during World War II. Became a part of the 7th Guards Army during the late 1980s.
- 9th Fortified Area, Ejmiatsin – Originally formed as 69th Fortified Region at Kazan in April 1942. Fought in Battle of the Caucasus and later transferred to Ejmiatsin as part of the 45th Army. Became a part of the 7th Guards Army during the late 1980s.

== Legacy ==
According to a 2013 poll conducted by Gallup, a majority 66% of Armenians assessed the breakup of the Soviet Union negatively, while only 12% assessed it positively. According to a 2017 poll conducted by the Pew Research Center, 79% of Armenians say that the Soviet dissolution was bad for the country.

== Bibliography ==
- Bournoutian, George A. (2018). Armenia and Imperial Decline: The Yerevan Province, 1900–1914. London: Routledge. ISBN 9781138480575.
- Bournoutian, George A. (2006). A Concise History of the Armenian People (5th ed.). Costa Mesa, CA: Mazda. ISBN 1568591411.
- Corley, Felix (1 March 1996). "The Armenian Church under the Soviet Regime, Part 1: The Leadership of Kevork". Religion, State and Society. 24 (1): 9–53. doi:10.1080/09637499608431724. ISSN 0963-7494.
- Dekmejian, R. Hrair (1997). "The Armenian Diaspora". In Hovannisian, Richard G. (ed.). The Armenian People From Ancient to Modern Times. Vol. 2. New York: St. Martin's Press. pp. 413–444. ISBN 978-0-312-10168-8.
- Grigoryan, Mark V. [in Russian] (2022). Ереван. Биография города [Yerevan: Biography of a City] (in Russian). Moscow: Slovo. ISBN 978-5-387-01752-0.
- Hambardzumyan, Viktor, ed. (1981). "Միկոյան, Արտյոմ Հովհաննեսի" [Mikoyan, Artem Hovhannesi]. Soviet Armenian Encyclopedia (in Armenian). Vol. 7. Yerevan: Armenian Academy of Sciences.
- Hewsen, Robert H. (2001). Armenia: A Historical Atlas. Chicago: University of Chicago Press. ISBN 978-0-226-33228-4.
- Hewsen, Robert H. (1981). "Matenadaran (The Mashtotz Institute of Ancient Manuscripts)". In Wieczynski, Joseph L. (ed.). The Modern Encyclopedia of Russian and Soviet History. Vol. 21. Gulf Breeze, FL: Academic International Press. pp. 136–138. ISBN 9780875690643.
- Hovannisian, Richard G. (1971). The Republic of Armenia. Vol. 1: The First Year, 1918–1919. Berkeley: University of California Press. ISBN 978-0520019843.
- Hovannisian, Richard G. (1996a). The Republic of Armenia. Vol. 3: From London to Sèvres, February–August 1920. Berkeley: University of California Press. ISBN 978-0520088030.
- Hovannisian, Richard G. (1996b). The Republic of Armenia. Vol. 4: Between Crescent and Sickle: Partition and Sovietization. Berkeley: University of California Press. ISBN 978-0520088047.
- Hayrapetyan, Kanakara (2018). "Ամենայն Հայոց Կաթողիկոս Խորէն Ա. Մուրադբեկյանի մահվան առեղծվածի վերլուծությունը պատմագիտության մեջ" [Historiographical Analysis of the Mysterious Death of Khoren I Muradbekyan, Catholicos of All Armenians]. Ejmiatsin (in Armenian). 75 (7).
- Khrushchev, Nikita S. (2004). Sergei Khrushchev (ed.). Memoirs of Nikita Khrushchev: Statesman, 1953-1964. Philadelphia: Pennsylvania State University Press. ISBN 0-271-02935-8.
- Khudaverdyan, Konstantin S. (1984). "Սովետական Միության Հայրենական Մեծ Պատերազմ 1941–45" [The Soviet Union's Great Patriotic War, 1941-1945]. In Hambardzumyan, Viktor (ed.). Soviet Armenian Encyclopedia (in Armenian). Vol. 10. Yerevan: Armenian Academy of Sciences.
- Krikorian, Robert O.; Masih, Joseph R. (1999). Armenia at the Crossroads. Amsterdam: Harwood Academic Publishers. ISBN 978-9057023453.
- Krikorian, Robert O. (2011). "Kars-Ardahan and Soviet Armenian Irredentism, 1945-1946". In Hovannisian, Richard G. (ed.). Armenian Kars and Ani. Costa Mesa, CA: Mazda. pp. 393–410. ISBN 978-1568591575.
- Laycock, Jo (2016). "Survivor or Soviet Stories? Repatriate Narratives in Armenian Histories, Memories and Identities" (PDF). History and Memory. 28 (2): 123–151. doi:10.2979/histmemo.28.2.0123. ISSN 0935-560X. JSTOR 10.2979/histmemo.28.2.0123. S2CID 159467141.
- Lehmann, Maike (2015). "Apricot Socialism: The National Past, the Soviet Project, and the Imagining of Community in Late Soviet Armenia". Slavic Review. 74 (1): 9–31.
- Lehmann, Maike (2012). "A Different Kind of Brothers: Exclusion and Partial Integration After Repatriation to a Soviet "Homeland"". Ab Imperio (3): 171–211. doi:10.1353/imp.2012.0104.
- Malkasian, Mark (1996). Gha-ra-bagh!: The Emergence of the National Democratic Movement in Armenia. Detroit: Wayne State University Press. ISBN 0-8143-2605-6.
- Martin, Terry (2001). The Affirmative Action Empire: Nations and Nationalism in the Soviet Union, 1923-1939. Ithaca, NY: Cornell University Press. ISBN 0-8014-8677-7.
- Matossian, Mary Kilbourne (1962). The Impact of Soviet Policies in Armenia. Leiden: E.J. Brill.
- Mstoyan, M. (1983). "Ռյա Թազա" [Ria Taza]. In Hambardzumyan, Viktor (ed.). Soviet Armenian Encyclopedia (in Armenian). Vol. 9. Yerevan: Armenian Academy of Sciences.
- Panossian, Razmik (2006). The Armenians: From Kings And Priests to Merchants And Commissars. New York: Columbia University Press. ISBN 978-0-231-13926-7.
- Payaslian, Simon (2007). The History of Armenia: From the Origins to the Present. New York: Palgrave Macmillan. ISBN 978-0-230-60858-0.
- Saparov, Arsène (2015). From Conflict to Autonomy in the Caucasus: The Soviet Union and the Making of Abkhazia, South Ossetia and Nagorno Karabakh. London: Routledge. ISBN 978-1-317-63783-7.
- Shakarian, Pietro A. (2025). Anastas Mikoyan: An Armenian Reformer in Khrushchev's Kremlin. Bloomington: Indiana University Press. ISBN 978-0253073556.
- Suny, Ronald Grigor (1993). Looking toward Ararat: Armenia in Modern History. Bloomington: Indiana University Press. ISBN 978-0-253-20773-9.
- Suny, Ronald Grigor (1997). "Soviet Armenia". In Hovannisian, Richard G. (ed.). The Armenian People From Ancient to Modern Times. Vol. 2. New York: St. Martin's Press. pp. 347–388. ISBN 978-0-312-10168-8.
- Tonoyan, Artyom (2021). "Introduction". Black Garden Aflame: The Nagorno-Karabakh Conflict in the Soviet and Russian Press. Minneapolis: East View Press. ISBN 978-1879944558.
- Tsutsiev, Arthur (2014). Atlas of the Ethno-Political History of the Caucasus (PDF). Translated by Nora Seligman Favorov. New Haven: Yale University Press. ISBN 9780300153088. Archived (PDF) from the original on 17 June 2023.
- Tucker, Robert C. (1992). Stalin in Power: The Revolution from Above, 1928–1941. New York: W. W. Norton & Company. ISBN 978-0-393-30869-3. LCCN 89078047. OCLC 26298147.
- Verluise, Pierre; Chorbajian, Levon (1995). Armenia in Crisis: The 1988 Earthquake. Detroit: Wayne State University Press. ISBN 0-8143-2527-0.
- Virabyan, Amatuni [in Armenian] (2001). Հայաստանը Ստալինից մինչև Խրուշչով: Հասարակական-քաղաքական կյանքը 1945-1957 թթ [Armenia from Stalin to Khrushchev: Social-Political Life, 1945-1957] (in Armenian). Yerevan: Gitutyun Publishing.
- Walker, Christopher J. (1990). Armenia: The Survival of a Nation (2nd ed.). New York: St. Martin's Press. ISBN 978-0312042301.
