= Anton Kochinyan =

Soviet Armenian politician (1913–1990)

- Անտոն Քոչինյան
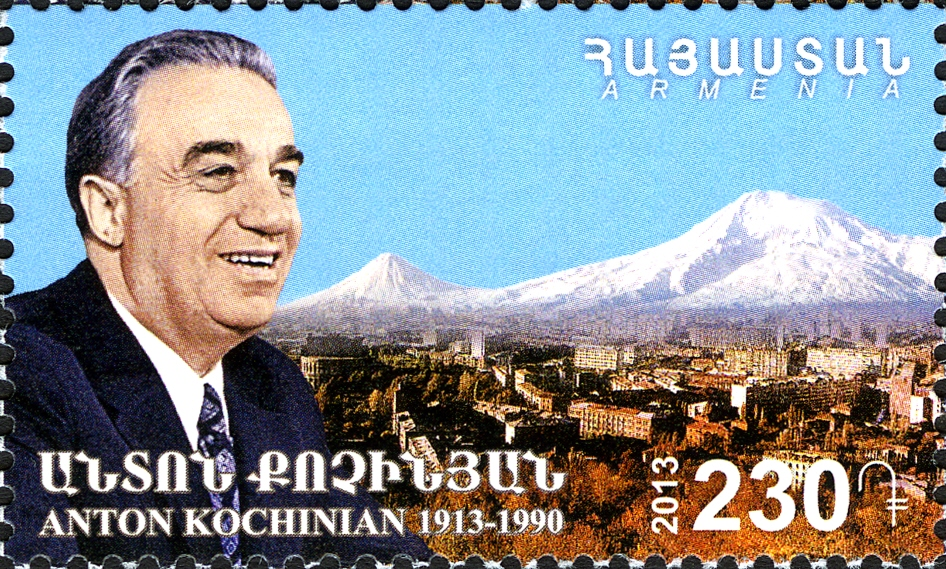
- Kochinyan on a 2013 Armenian stamp

First Secretary of the Communist Party of Armenia
- In office 5 February 1966 – 27 November 1974
- Preceded by: Yakov Zarobyan
- Succeeded by: Karen Demirchyan

Chairman of the Council of Ministers of the Armenian Soviet Socialist Republic
- In office 20 November 1952 – 5 February 1966
- Preceded by: Sahak Karapetyan
- Succeeded by: Badal Muradyan

Minister of Foreign Affairs of the Armenian SSR
- In office 1954–1958
- Preceded by: Gevorg Hovhannisian
- Succeeded by: Balabek Martirosian

Personal details
- Born: Anton Yervandi Kochinyan; October 25, 1913 Shahali, Borchaly uezd, Tiflis Governorate, Russian Empire
- Died: December 1, 1990 (aged 77) Yerevan, Armenian SSR, Soviet Union
- Party: CPSU / Communist Party of Armenia
- Occupation: politician

Anton Yervandi Kochinyan (Armenian: Անտոն Երվանդի Քոչինյան; 25 October 1913 – 1 December 1990) was a Soviet Armenian politician. He served as Chairman of the Armenian Council of Ministers from 1952 to 1966, and as the First Secretary of the Communist Party of Armenia from 1966 until his retirement in 1974.

== Biography ==
In September 1966, Kochinyan, together with Badal Muradyan, unsuccessfully appealed to the Soviet central government in Moscow for the unification of Nagorno-Karabakh with Armenia. Kochinyan was later succeeded as Armenia's first secretary by Karen Demirchyan in 1974.

== Publications ==
- Kochinyan, Anton (1960). Armenia: Big Strides in an Ancient Land. London: Soviet Booklets.
- Kochinyan, Anton (2008). Անավարտ հուշեր. Yerevan: Հեղինակային հրատարակություն. ISBN 978-9939532189.
