= Badal Muradyan =

Soviet Armenian politician (1915–1991)

- Բադալ Մուրադյան
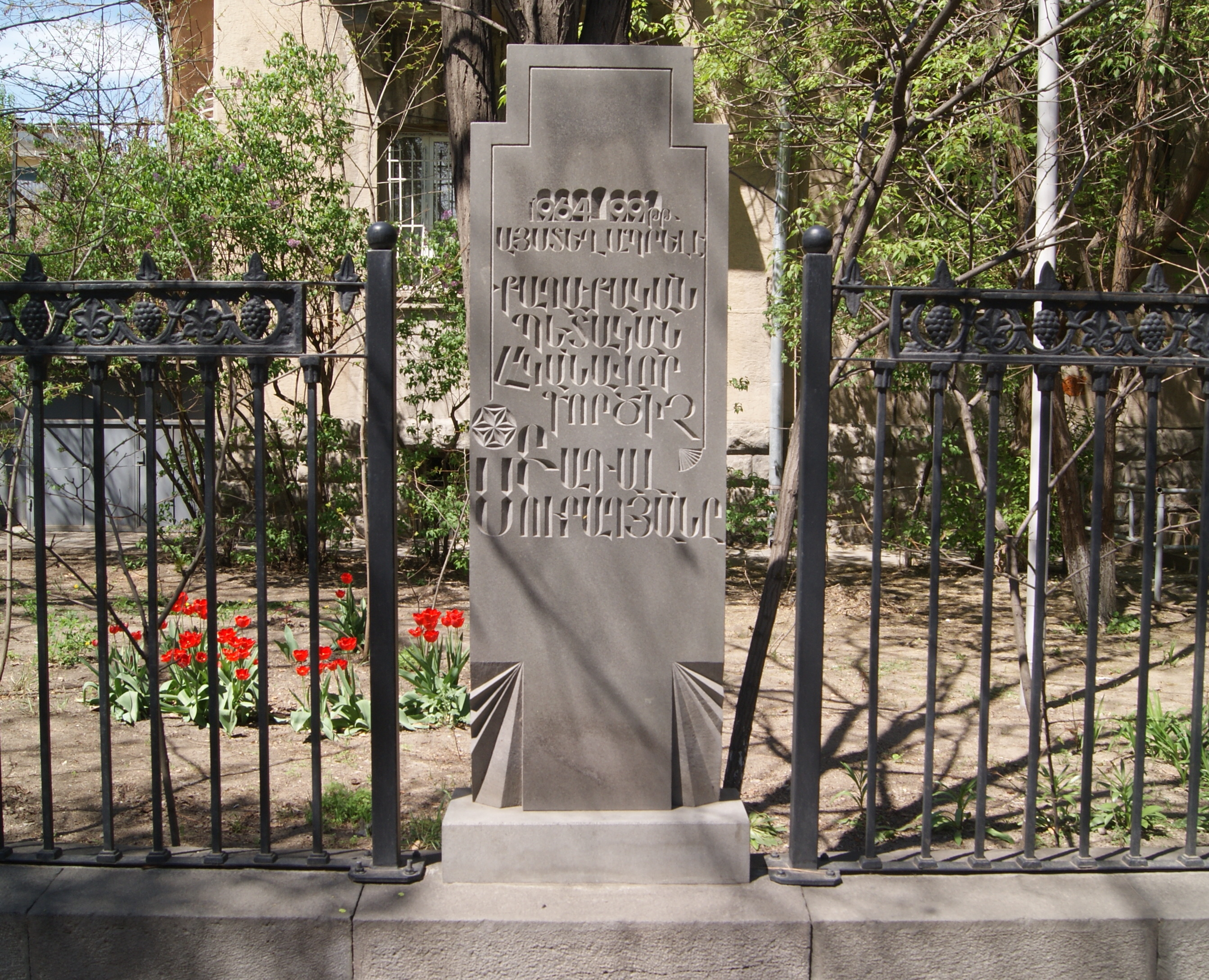
- Badal Muradyan's plaque on Moskovyan Street in Yerevan

Chairman of the Council of Ministers of the Armenian Soviet Socialist Republic
- In office February 5, 1966 – November 21, 1972
- Preceded by: Anton Kochinyan
- Succeeded by: Grigory Arzumanyan

Personal details
- Born: 8 January 1915 Chibukhchi, Etchmiadzin uezd, Erivan Governorate, Russian Empire
- Died: 30 September 1991 (aged 76) Yerevan, Armenia
- Party: CPSU
- Occupation: Chemist, politician

Badal Hmayaki Muradyan (Armenian: Բադալ Հմայակի Մուրադյան; 8 January 1915 – 30 September 1991) was a Soviet Armenian politician who served as Chairman of the Council of Ministers of the Armenian SSR from 1966 to 1972.

== Biography ==
Muradyan was born on 8 January 1915 in the village of Chibukhchi (Vardanashen) in the Etchmiadzin uezd of the Erivan Governorate of the Russian Empire (today the Armavir Province of Armenia). He attended the Yerevan Polytechnic University and became a chemist. Beginning around 1956, he worked as the first secretary of the Armenian Communist Party for the Lenin District of Yerevan. After serving as the director of the Kirov Chemical Plant, he became the first secretary of Yerevan city committee from 1961 to 1966.

On 5 February 1966, Muradyan became the Chairman of the Council of Ministers of Armenia, at the beginning of the Brezhnev era. During his tenure, he was known for his advocacy for the Armenians of the Nagorno-Karabakh Autonomous Oblast (NKAO). In September 1966, Muradyan, together with Armenian First Secretary Anton Kochinyan, unsuccessfully appealed to the Soviet central government in Moscow for the unification of the NKAO with the Armenian SSR. He also worked with Kochinyan and Anastas Mikoyan to organize the festivities marking the centenary of the poet Hovhannes Tumanyan in Yerevan and Dsegh in September 1969.

Muradyan stepped down from his post in November 1972, officially due to the "state of his health." That year, he returned to work at the Kirov Chemical Plant. From 1976 to 1981, he served as the General Director of the Nairit Scientific-Production Association in Yerevan. Muradyan became deputy chairman of the state planning committee of Soviet Armenia in 1981, and eventually became the committee's chief specialist. He died on 30 September 1991. A plaque dedicated to his memory stands on Moskovyan Street in Yerevan. There is also a street named after him in the Armenian capital. He was a recipient of the Order of Lenin.
