= Ghukas Madoyan =

Soviet lieutenant colonel (1906–1975)

- Born: 15 January [O.S. 2 January] 1906; Kers, Kars Oblast, Russian Empire (located within present-day Turkey)
- Died: 11 June 1975 (aged 69); Yerevan, Armenian Soviet Socialist Republic, Soviet Union
- Military career
- Allegiance: Soviet Union
- Branch: Red Army
- Service years: 1920–1925; 1930–1933; 1940–1944
- Rank: Lieutenant Colonel
- Unit: 159th Separate Rifle Brigade
- Conflicts: Russian Civil War; World War II
- Awards: Hero of the Soviet Union

Ghukas Karapetovich Madoyan (Russian: Гукас Карапетович Мадоян; Armenian: Ղուկաս Կարապետի Մադոյան; 15 January [O.S. 2 January] 1906 – 11 June 1975) was a Red Army officer awarded the title Hero of the Soviet Union.

Born in Kars Oblast in modern-day Turkey, Madoyan fought in the Russian Civil War with the Red Army and was demobilized afterwards. He worked in the public catering and cooperative sectors and briefly rejoined the army as an officer in the early 1930s. Madoyan was called up again in 1940 and fought in World War II. For leading a battalion in the defense of a key rail junction during the recapture of Rostov-on-Don in early 1943, he was made a Hero of the Soviet Union. After graduating from the Frunze Military Academy, Madoyan became a regimental commander and was seriously wounded in Poland in late 1944, resulting in his discharge from the army. Postwar, he was active in the Communist Party of Armenia and served as the Minister of Social Welfare of the Armenian Soviet Socialist Republic.

== Early life ==
Madoyan was born on 15 January 1906 in the village of Kers in Kars Oblast (present-day Turkey) to an Armenian peasant family. He received incomplete secondary education and joined the Red Army in 1920, fighting in Armenia and the Red Army invasion of Georgia in 1921. After graduating from an infantry school in 1924, Madoyan was demobilized in 1925. He became a member of the Communist Party of the Soviet Union that year, and until 1928 worked in the cooperative and public catering sector. Between 1928 and 1930, Madoyan was the chief of the industrial department of a worker cooperative in Yerevan. In 1930, he rejoined the army, serving as a company commander in the Armenian Rifle Regiment for the next three years. Madoyan was head of the Yerevan weapons trade department between 1933 and 1937, and head of a department of the Yerevan Main Deli from then until 1940, when he rejoined the army. He graduated from the Vystrel refresher courses in 1940.

== World War II ==
Madoyan fought in World War II starting in June 1941 after the German invasion of the Soviet Union. He became a company commander and fought in the Battle of Stalingrad in late 1942. In December, he took command of the 3rd Battalion of the 159th Separate Rifle Brigade. In early February 1943, the brigade, attached to the 28th Army, fought in the North Caucasian Strategic Offensive, whose objective was to recapture the North Caucasus from retreating German troops. On the night of 8 February, his battalion captured Rostov's railway station, one of the first units to advance into the city. In the morning, then-Senior Lieutenant Madoyan took command of consolidated units from the brigade, and defended the station for six days until reinforcements arrived on 14 February. According to Soviet reports, the troops repulsed 32 German counterattacks, killed up to 300 soldiers, and destroyed a tank and three firing positions. On 31 March, Madoyan was awarded the title Hero of the Soviet Union and the Order of Lenin for "exemplary leadership, courage, and heroism". On 6 January 1944, he was awarded the United States Army Distinguished Service Medal for his actions at Rostov.

Madoyan continued to fight in combat, and was promoted to Lieutenant Colonel on 15 May 1944. In the same year, he graduated from the Frunze Military Academy, after which he took command of the 359th Rifle Division's 1194th Rifle Regiment, part of the 38th Army on the 1st Ukrainian Front. In October, he was seriously wounded in battles near the city of Dębica, and subsequently discharged from the army due to his injury. During the war, Madoyan was wounded a total of three times and concussed once. He was awarded the Order of Alexander Nevsky on 30 November 1944 and the Medal "For Battle Merit" on 30 April 1945.

== Postwar ==
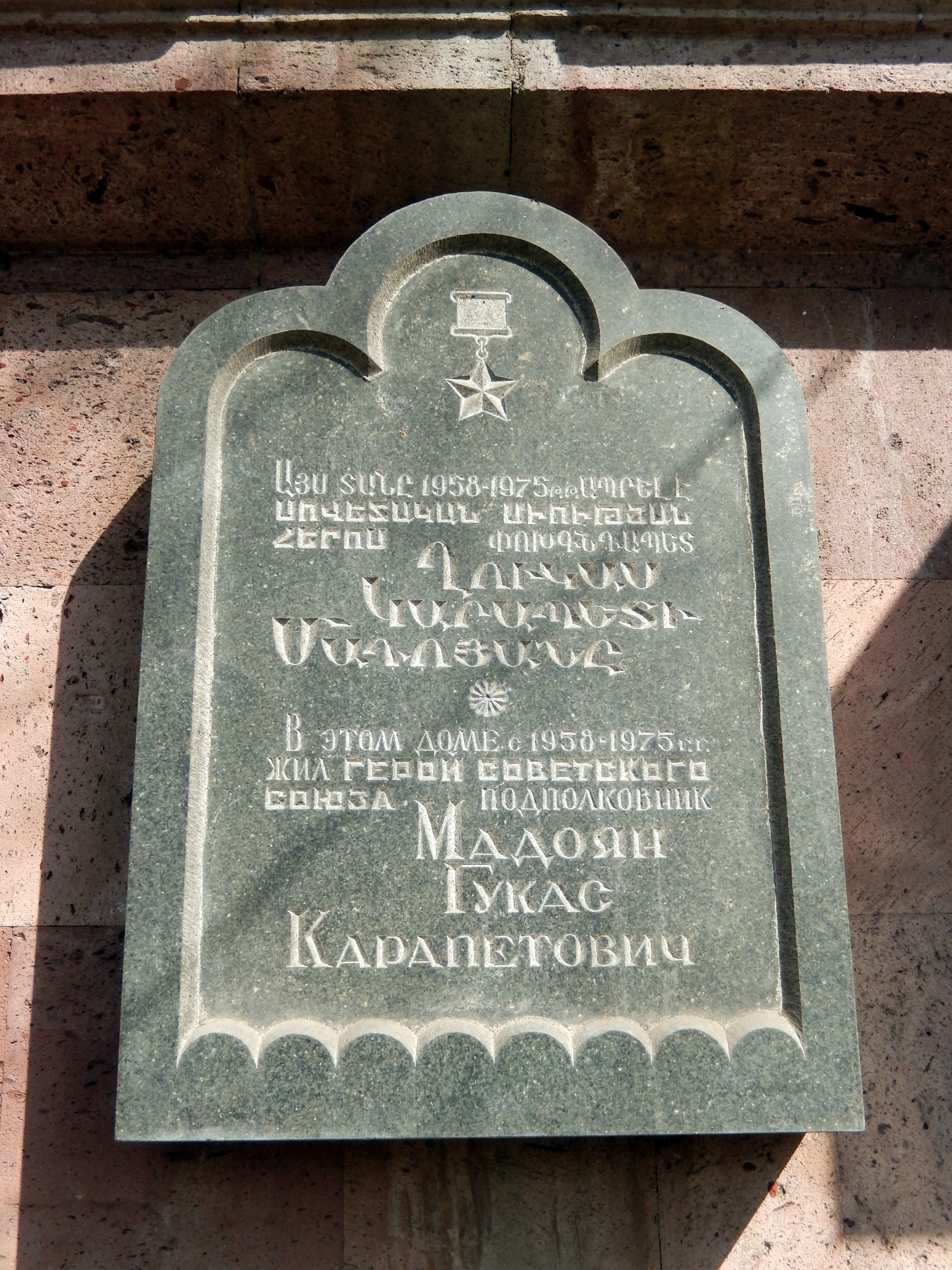
A plaque in honor of Madoyan in Yerevan

Madoyan returned to Yerevan and in 1945 became a department head in the city's council of deputies. In 1946, he became deputy trade minister of the Armenian Soviet Socialist Republic and graduated from a party school in the same year. Madoyan became deputy Minister of Social Welfare in 1948 and in 1952 became the Minister of Social Welfare of the Armenian SSR. In 1961, he became an adviser to the Chairman of the Council of Ministers of the Armenian SSR. He was a deputy of the Supreme Soviet of the Armenian SSR during its second, third, fourth, and fifth convocations between 1946 and 1963. On 28 October 1967, he was awarded the Order of the Badge of Honour. In 1968, Madoyan was made an honorary citizen of Rostov-on-Don. He died in Yerevan on 11 June 1975.

A street in Rostov-on-Don was named for him.

== Awards ==
- Hero of the Soviet Union (31 March 1943)
- Order of Lenin (31 March 1943)
- Order of Alexander Nevsky (30 November 1944)
- Order of the Badge of Honour (28 October 1967)
- Medal "For Courage"
- Medal "For Battle Merit"
- Medal "For the Defence of Stalingrad"
- Army Distinguished Service Medal (United States)
