= Hrazdan Gorge Aqueduct =

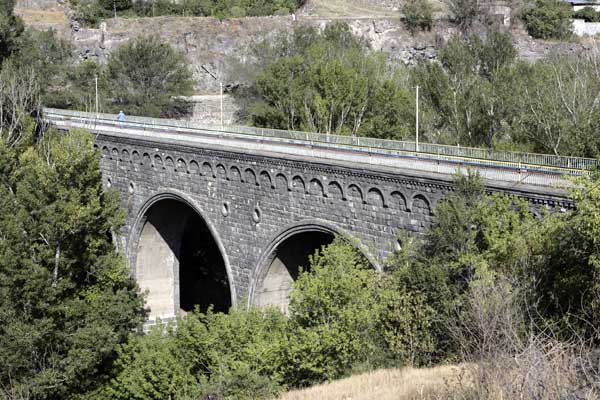
- Hrazdan Gorge Aqueduct
- Coordinates: 40°10′44″N 44°29′54″E
- Crosses: Hrazdan River
- Locale: Yerevan

Characteristics
- Design: aqueduct bridge
- Total length: 100 m (328.1 ft)
- Width: 5 m (16.4 ft)

History
- Opened: 1950

Hrazdan Gorge Aqueduct (Armenian: Հրազդանի Ձորի ջրանցույց) is an aqueduct bridge across the Hrazdan River in the Armenian capital of Yerevan. It was designed by architect Rafael Israelyan and completed in 1949–1950. It was built with grey-coloured basalt stones. The aqueduct has a length of 100 metres and a width of 5 metres.
