= Musaler =

Village in Armavir, Armenia

Musaler Մուսալեռ
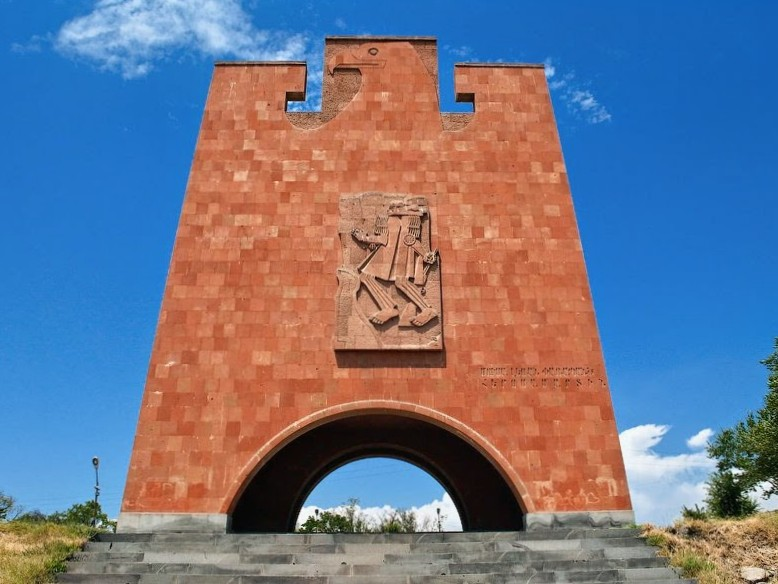
- Memorial to the Musa Dagh resistance.

- Location within Armenia
- Coordinates: 40°09′16″N 44°22′40″E
- Country: Armenia
- Marz (Province): Armavir
- Elevation: 850 m (2,790 ft)

Population (2011)
  - Total: 2,641
- Time zone: UTC+4 ( )
  - Summer (DST): UTC+5 ( )

Musaler, previously known as Ginevet (Armenian: Մուսալեռ), is a village in the Armavir Province of Armenia. The village was renamed in 1972 after Musa Ler, the site of Armenian resistance in 1915.

== Population ==
Part of the population was repatriated from Lebanon, Syria, Egypt and the villages of Musa Ler in Cilicia in 1946.

Historical population
Year	Pop.	±% p.a.
1926	57	—
1939	565	+19.30%
1959	1,260	+4.09%
1970	3,114	+8.57%
1979	2,197	−3.80%
1989	2,378	+0.79%
2001	2,534	+0.53%
2011	2,641	+0.41%

== Harisa Festival ==
Every mid-September, people gather near the memorial of the Musa Dagh resistance in Musaler to participate in the Harisa festival that aims to celebrate the resistance that took place in 1915. During the festival, volunteers cook harisa, traditional Armenian food that is said to be cooked by Armenian refugees during the 40 days of resistance on Musa Dagh.

== Musa Dagh Memorial ==
The Musa Dagh Memorial is dedicated to the heroic battle of Musa Dagh. The monument's architect was Rafayel Israyelian and its sculptor was Ara Harutyunyan. The monument was built with the financial resources and direct participation of Musa Dagh residents of Armenia and the Armenian diaspora. The monument that resembles an impregnable fortress was made to symbolize the stubborn and unbreakable will, the spirit of liberation, masculinity and courage of the participants in the heroic battle of Musa Dagh. Next to the monument, at the foot of the hill, are also the graves of Musa Dagh residents who died in the First Nagorno-Karabakh War.

== Holy Savior Church ==
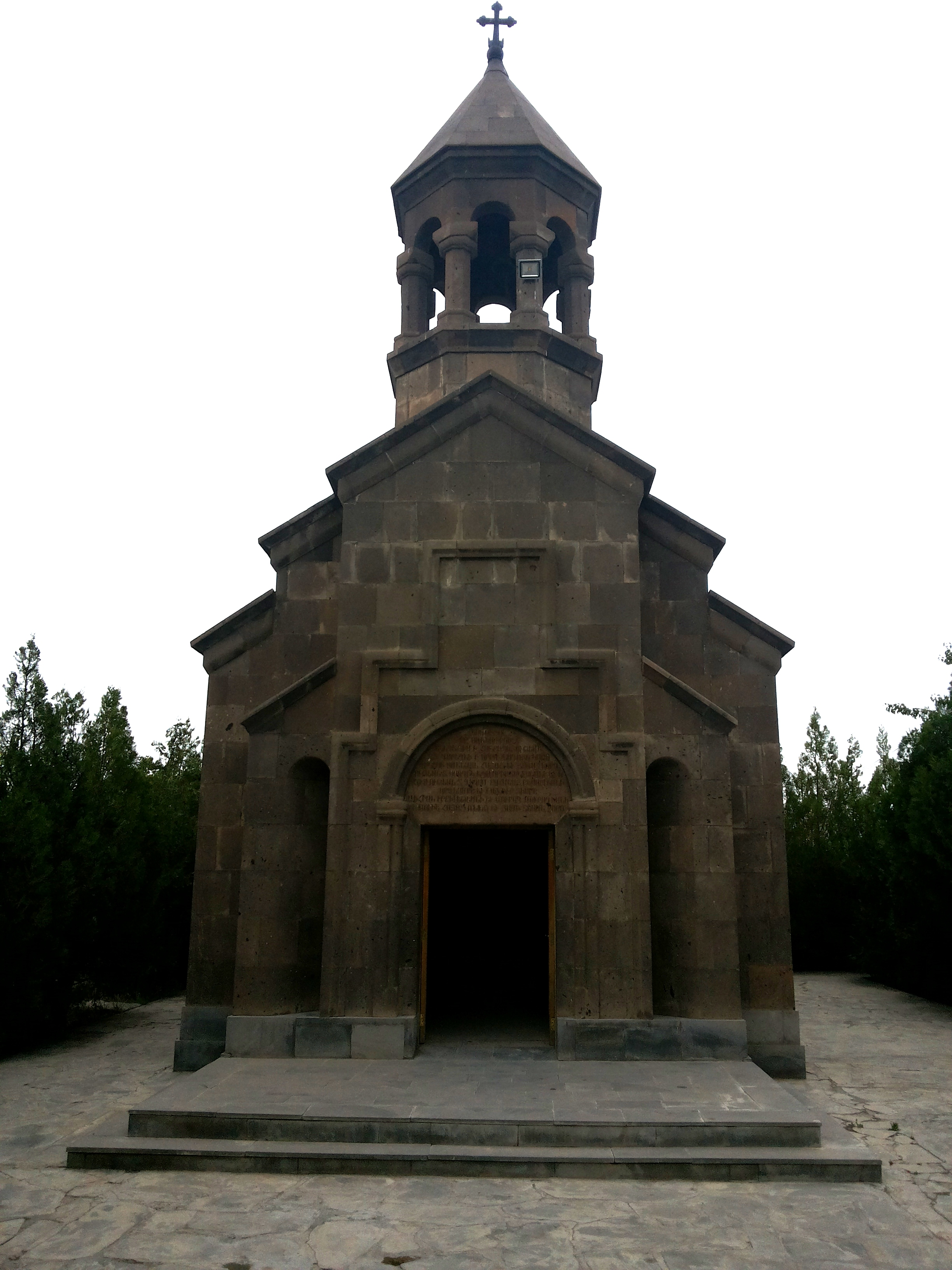
Holy Savior Church (Musaler)

The Holy Savior Church in Musaler was consecrated in 2000 and is the only church in Musaler. The sister church of the Holy Savior Church is the Saint Gevorg Church, in Glendale, California. The benefactors of the church are Murad Muradyan and Mihran Erkiletyan.

== Gallery ==
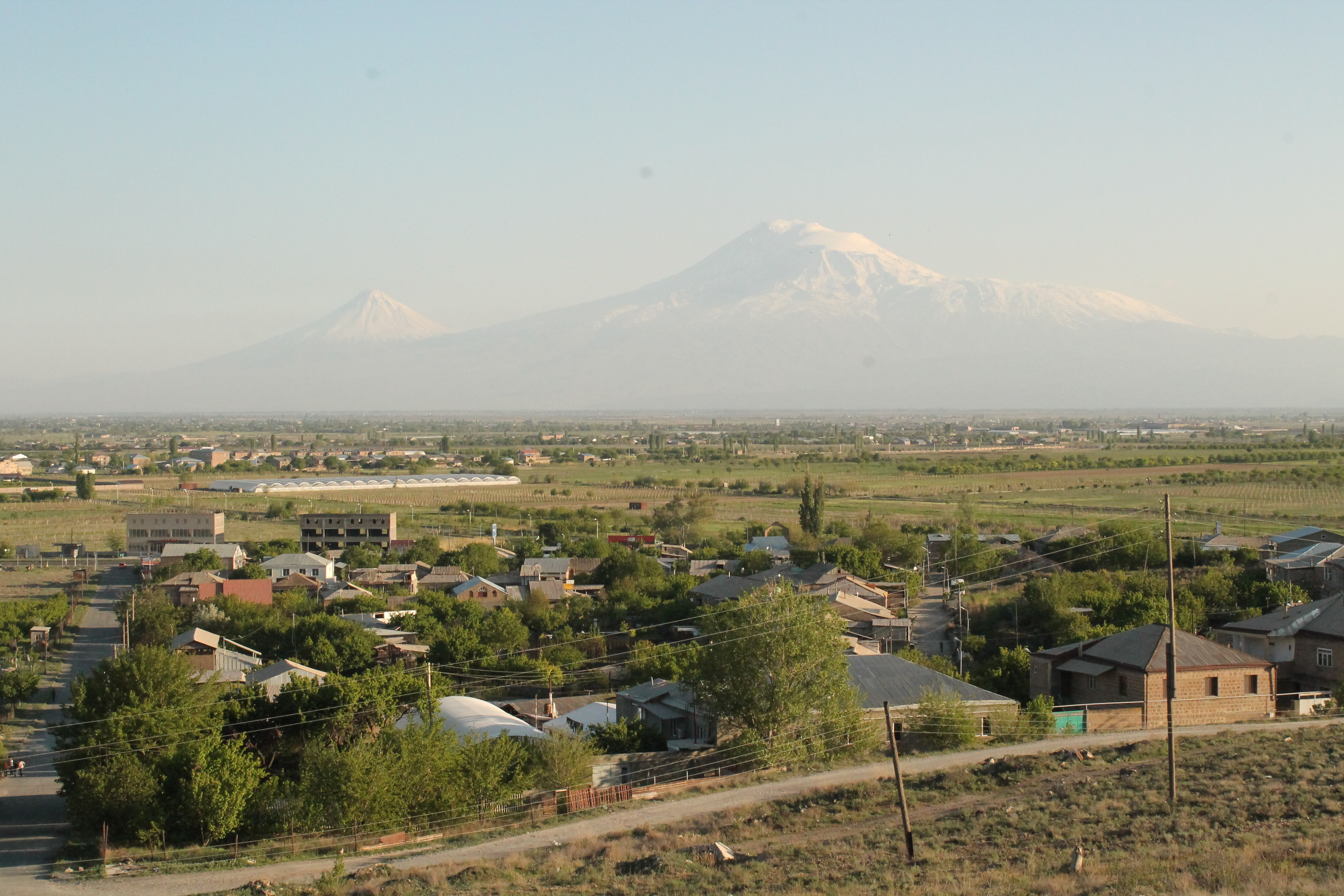
Musaler village

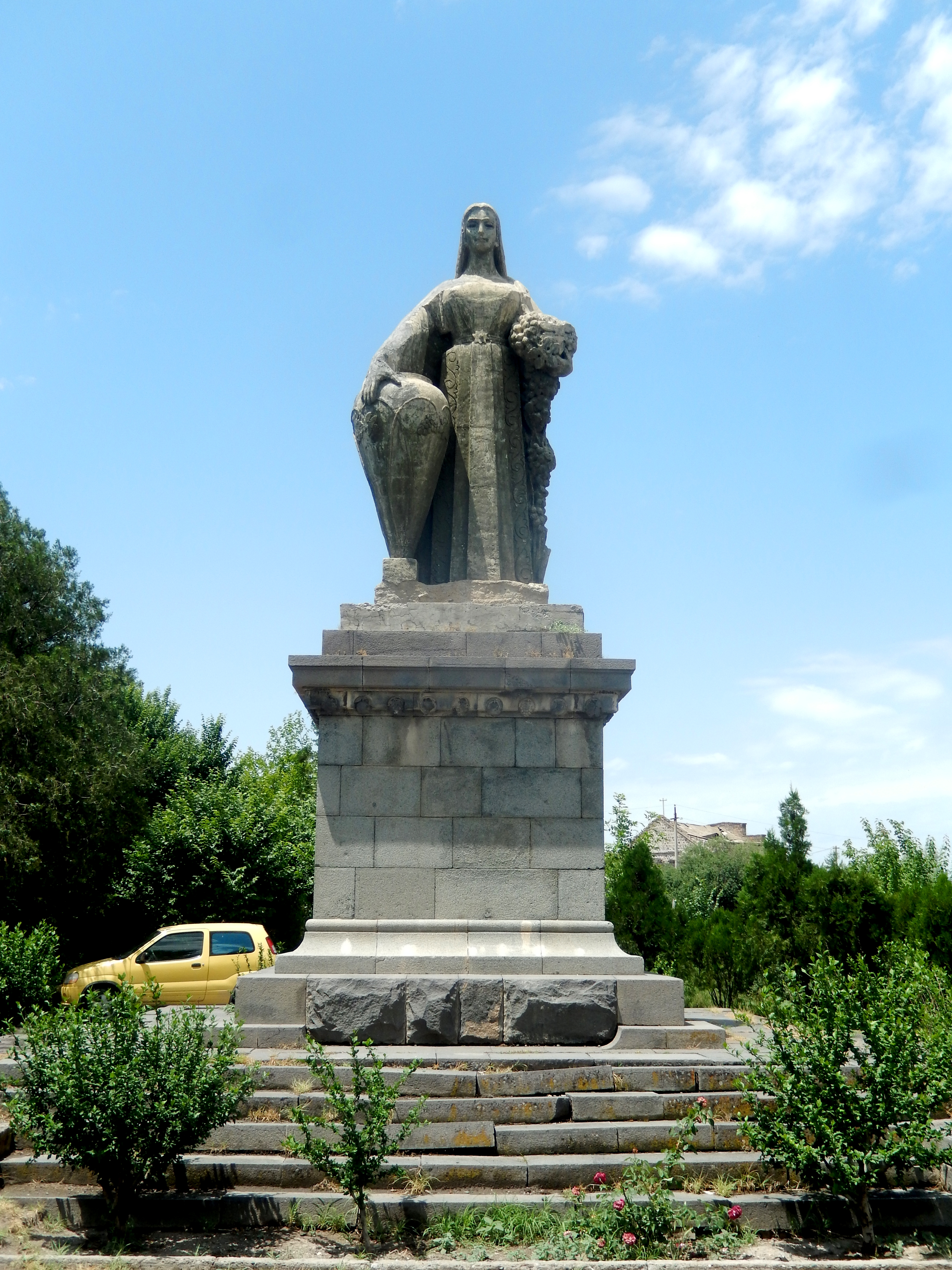
Monument in Musaler

== See also ==
- Armavir Province
