= Rafayel Israyelian =

Armenian architect (1908–1973)

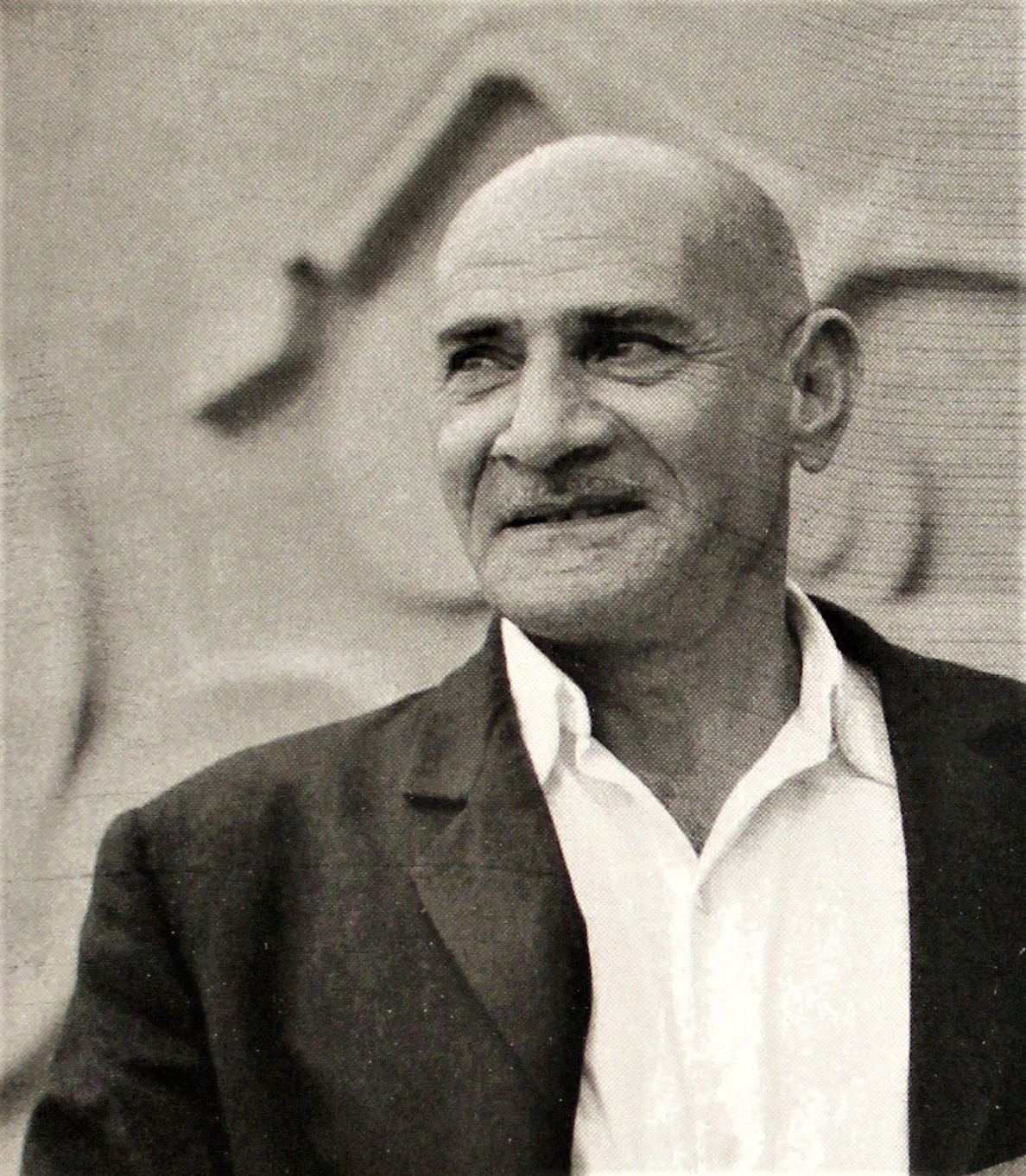
- Born: 17 September [O.S. 4 September] 1908; Tiflis, Russian Empire
- Died: September 8, 1973 (aged 64); Yerevan, Soviet Armenia, USSR
- Education: Ilya Repin Leningrad Institute for Painting, Sculpture and Architecture (1936)
- Occupation: Architect
- Years active: 1936–1973
- Notable work: List
- Spouse: Sofia Muradyan (m. 1934)
- Children: 2 sons (Vahagn, Areg); 3 daughters
- Awards: List
- Website: www.rafaelisraelyan.com

Rafayel "Rafo" Israyelian (Armenian: Ռաֆայել Իսրայելյան; 17 September [O.S. 4 September] 1908 – 8 September 1973) was a Soviet Armenian architect.

Seen as a follower of Alexander Tamanian, Israyelian designed some of Soviet Armenia's most prominent structures, including the Sardarapat Memorial, the Yerevan Wine Factory and several churches, both in Armenia and abroad, most notably St. Sargis in Yerevan and St. Vartan in New York.

== Life ==
Israyelian was born in Tiflis (modern-day Tbilisi, capital of Georgia), then part of the Russian Empire, on 17 September [O.S. 4 September] 1908 to Armenian parents. His father, Sargis, was a philologist and folklorist born in Shusha (Shushi), Karabakh, while his mother, Mariam (née Hakhnazarian) was a teacher, originally from Nakhichevan.

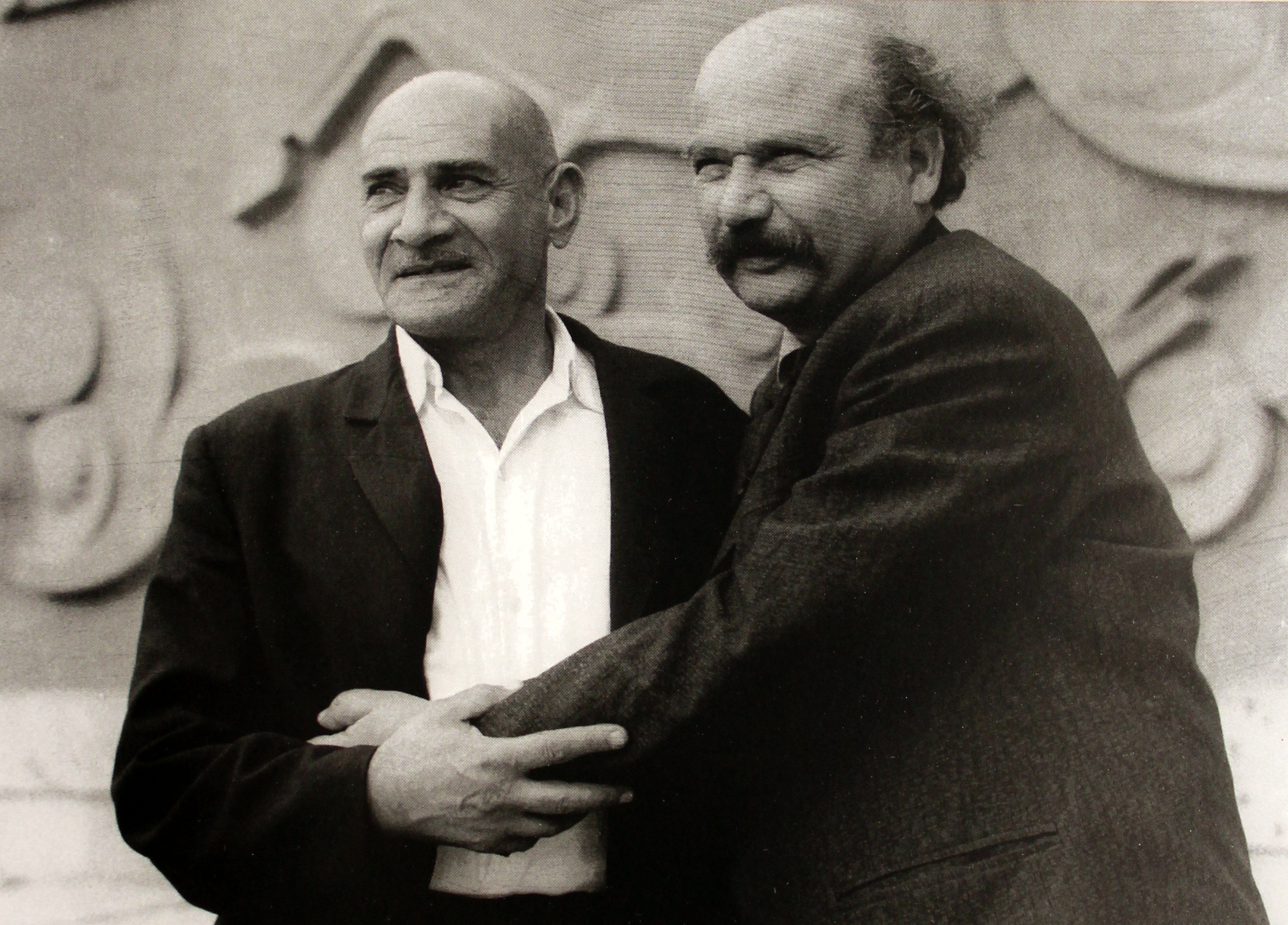
Israyelian with long-time collaborator Ara Harutyunyan, a sculptor.

He attended an Armenian school in Tiflis and continued his education at the State Academy of Arts of Georgia, from which he graduated in 1928 as an architect. He later moved to Leningrad, where he studied at the Leningrad Institute of Communal Building from 1929 to 1932. He thereafter continued his education at the Ilya Repin Leningrad Institute for Painting, Sculpture and Architecture (formerly the Imperial Academy of Arts) until 1936.

Israyelian moved to Yerevan, Soviet Armenia in 1936 and worked at different state-run architectural organizations. He taught at the Yerevan Polytechnic Institute from 1941 to 1963. In 1936–41, Israyelian worked at the Haypetnakhagits (Armenian State Project) Institute for urban planning. He completed a number of projects there, including the retirement home in Nor Kharberd and the dormitory of the Metallurgical Technical College in Yerevan. Israyelian then worked at the Yerevan Polytechnic Institute first as a lab technician, then as an assistant, and after 1947, as an associate professor.

From 1942, Israyelian started working in the Committee for the Protection of Monuments of Armenia, whose chairman was academician Hovsep Orbeli. Because of the war, there were no funds for the restoration of the monuments, thus the committee engaged in research instead. During these years Israyelian toured the entire territory of Armenia on foot. At that time, he thoroughly studied the khachkars, drew sketches authored a large volume of research. His research on khachkars was published posthumously in the Etchmiadzin magazine in 1977. It was the first thorough study of khachkars. During World War II, Israyelian also served in an anti-aircraft defense unit based in Yerevan.

In 1947, at the conference of young architects held in Moscow, Israyelian's works won the first prize. At that time, he was already working on the Victory Monument the construction of which was completed in 1950. In 1952, after defending a thesis at the Leningrad Academy of Fine Arts, the topic of which was "My architectural works", he received the scientific degree of candidate of architecture. Israyelian was also designing a number of residential houses at the time. In addition to architectural works, he made sketches for applied art, some of which were accepted for wide production. He closely worked with the Armenian Apostolic Church, under Catholicos Vazgen I and was part of the architectural committee of the Mother See of Holy Etchmiadzin from 1956 to 1972. He extensively studied khachkars and his studies were published in Etchmiadzin magazine posthumously in 1977.

Israyelian died on September 8, 1973, aged 65, at his Yerevan home, after a long illness.

=== Family ===
Israyelian married Sofia Muradyan in 1934. They had two sons and three daughters. His first son, Vahagn (b. 1937), is a geologist and second son, Areg (1939–2001), was an architect, who completed some of his father's unfinished works.

=== Personality ===
Varazdat Harutyunyan wrote that Israyelian had a peculiar character and a "fondness for drinking". Catholicos Vazgen I was "particularly warm" towards him and "highly valued his generous talent". When he became seriously ill, the Catholicos had medicine supplied to him, and when his condition became terminal, he personally visited Israyelian's home. After his death, Vazgen performed a memorial service at Etchmiadzin Cathedral and spoke warmly in his memory.

== Style ==
Israyelian was inspired by traditional Armenian architecture, especially church architecture. He utilized many traditional designs in his projects. His work combined traditional and modern architecture. In this aspect, he is seen as a follower of the neoclassical architect Alexander Tamanian. In the 1960s he revived Tamanian's neo-Armenian style; Israyelian, "while employing the stylistic principles of medieval as well as vernacular Armenian architecture, was able to re-examine its aesthetic through a functional-constructivist prism." Israelyan thus emerged as a leading figure in the reemergence of a national "school" of architecture by the 1970s. As "a politically bold architect of talent", he used his projects "to reassert Armenian traditions of heavy mass, natural stone, small cleancut apertures and bas relief decoration."

He also borrowed from the architecture of Mesopotamia (Sumer, Babylon, and Assyria).

In their 1986 book on Soviet Armenian architecture, Artsvin Grigoryan and Martin Tovmasyan commended Israelyan's work, namely the Victory Monument and the Museum of Armenian Ethnography. They found the monument to be a masterful resolution of complex scaling challenges and praised the choice of black tuff. The museum, in their view, represented one of the most outstanding works of Soviet Armenian architecture, demonstrating a profound understanding of museum design through its innovative use of natural light. They saw this as a groundbreaking reinterpretation of traditional Armenian architectural elements.

== Works ==
=== Memorials ===
Israyelian created two memorials dedicated to the victims of the Armenian genocide, when its 50th anniversary was commemorated in 1965. The better known monument is located at Mother See of Holy Etchmiadzin and was inaugurated on April 24, 1965. It features several crosses inspired by traditional khachkars and a sword and shield, symbolizing Armenian self-defense efforts during the genocide. The second memorial is located Yerevan's Erebuni District. The latter was sculpted by Ara Harutyunyan.

Israyelian's best-known memorial is the Sardarapat Memorial, near Araks, Armavir, completed in 1968 and inaugurated on May 25 of that year. It is dedicated to the 1918 Battle of Sardarabad, in which the Armenian forces stopped the advantage of Turkish forces towards Yerevan. He also designed memorials dedicated to self-defenses during the Armenian Genocide. The monument to 1915 Defense of Hachn, was erected in Nor Hachn in 1974 and the memorial of Musa Dagh in Musaler in 1976. The latter was sculpted by Ara Harutyunyan. The memorial of the 1918 Battle of Bash-Aparan was erected in Aparan in 1979.

In 1967 a memorial designed by Israyelian was erected in the Armenian-populated village of Banants (Bayan) in Azerbaijan dedicated to the villagers killed in World War II. The memorial was demolished around 1990 during the Nagorno-Karabakh conflict.

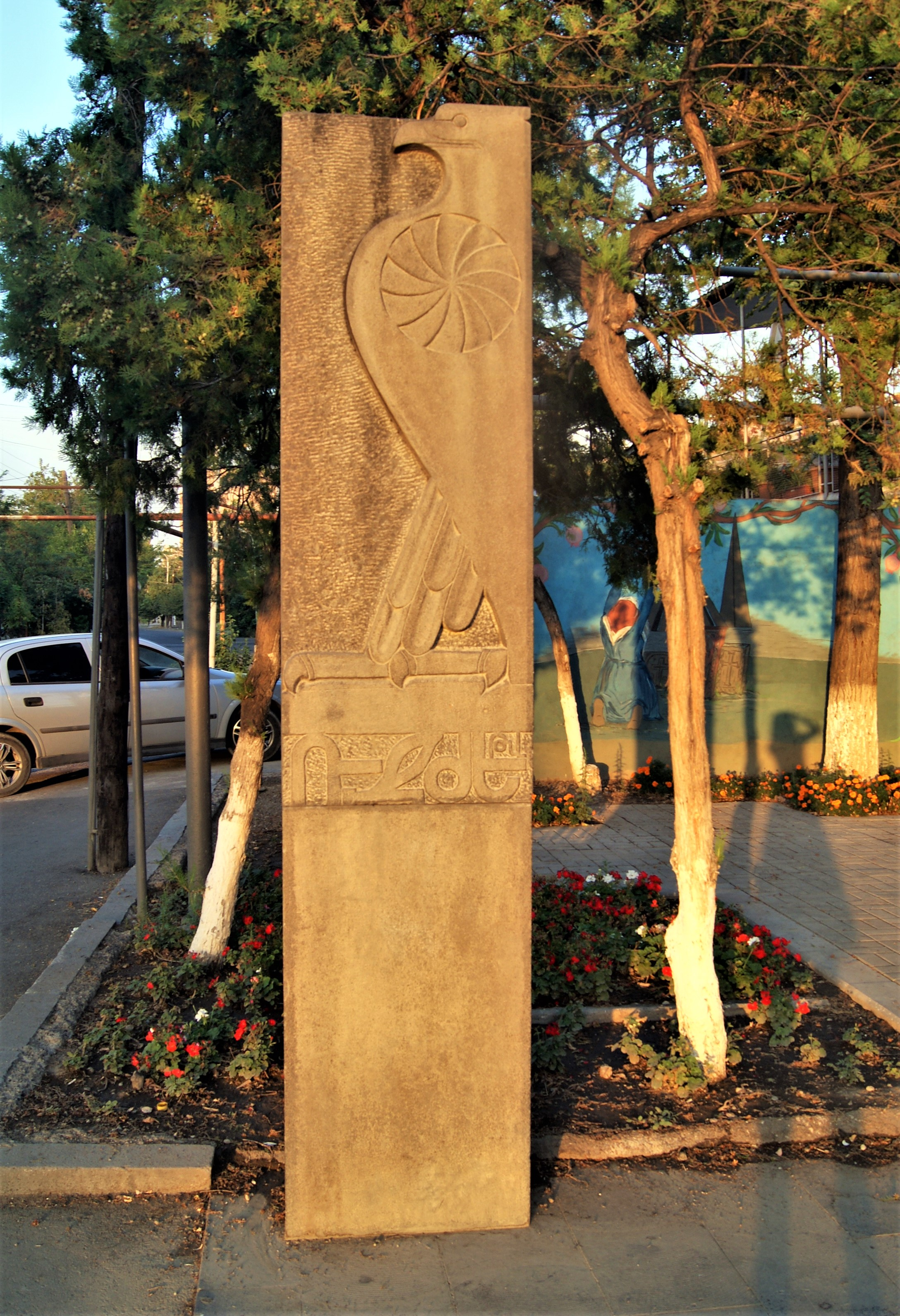
Genocide memorial in Yerevan (1965)

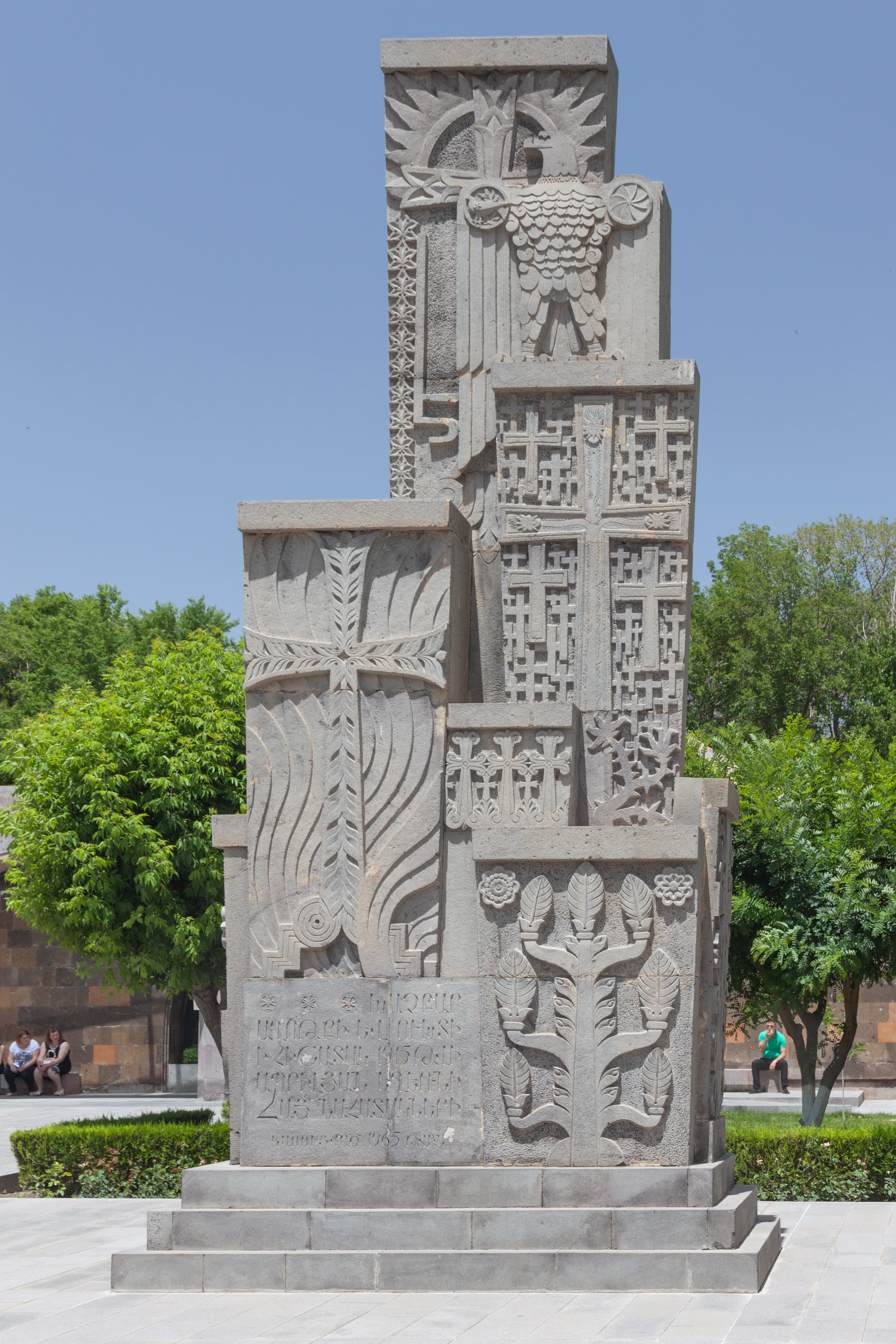
Genocide memorial in Ejmiatsin (1965)

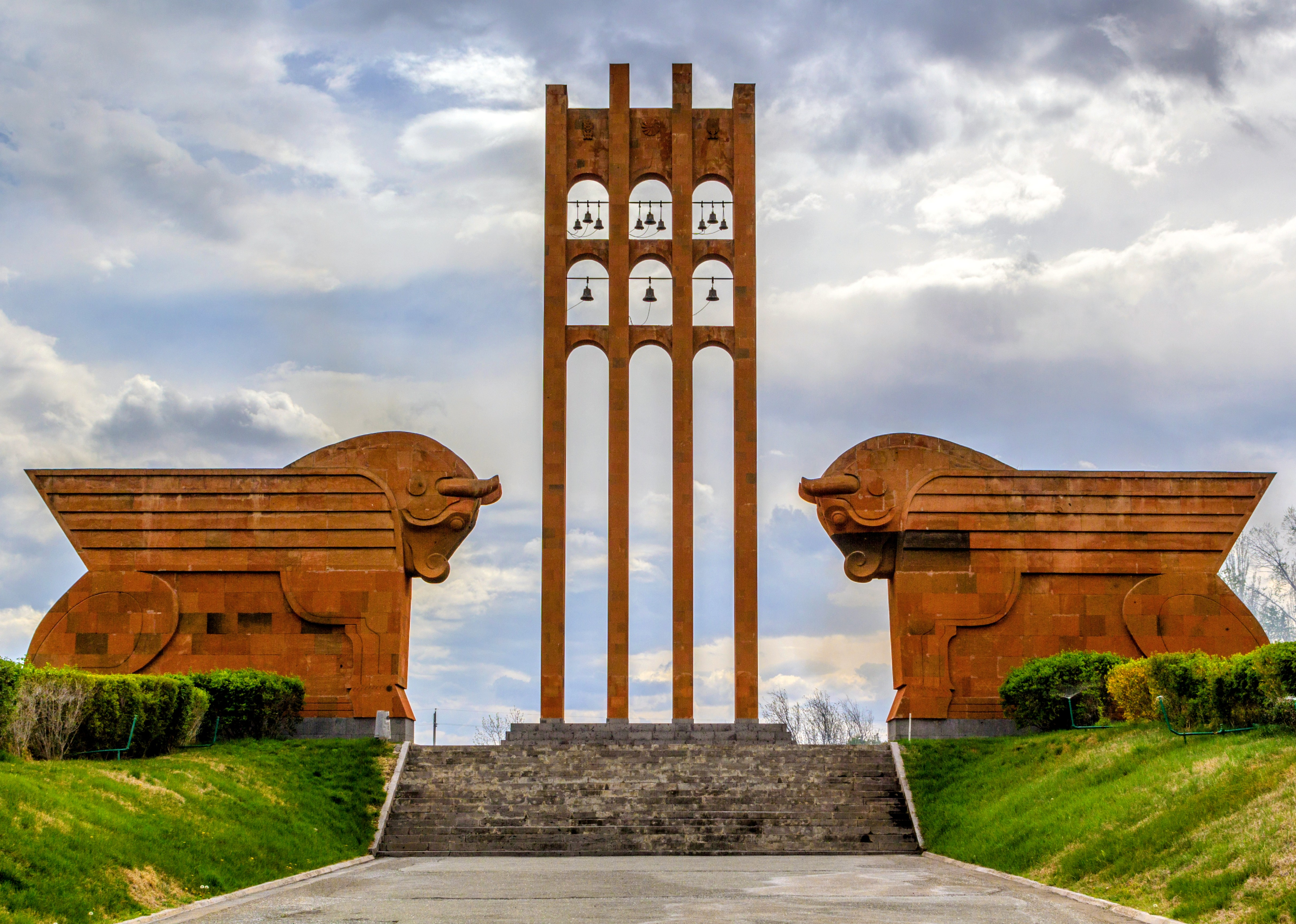
Sardarapat Memorial (1968)

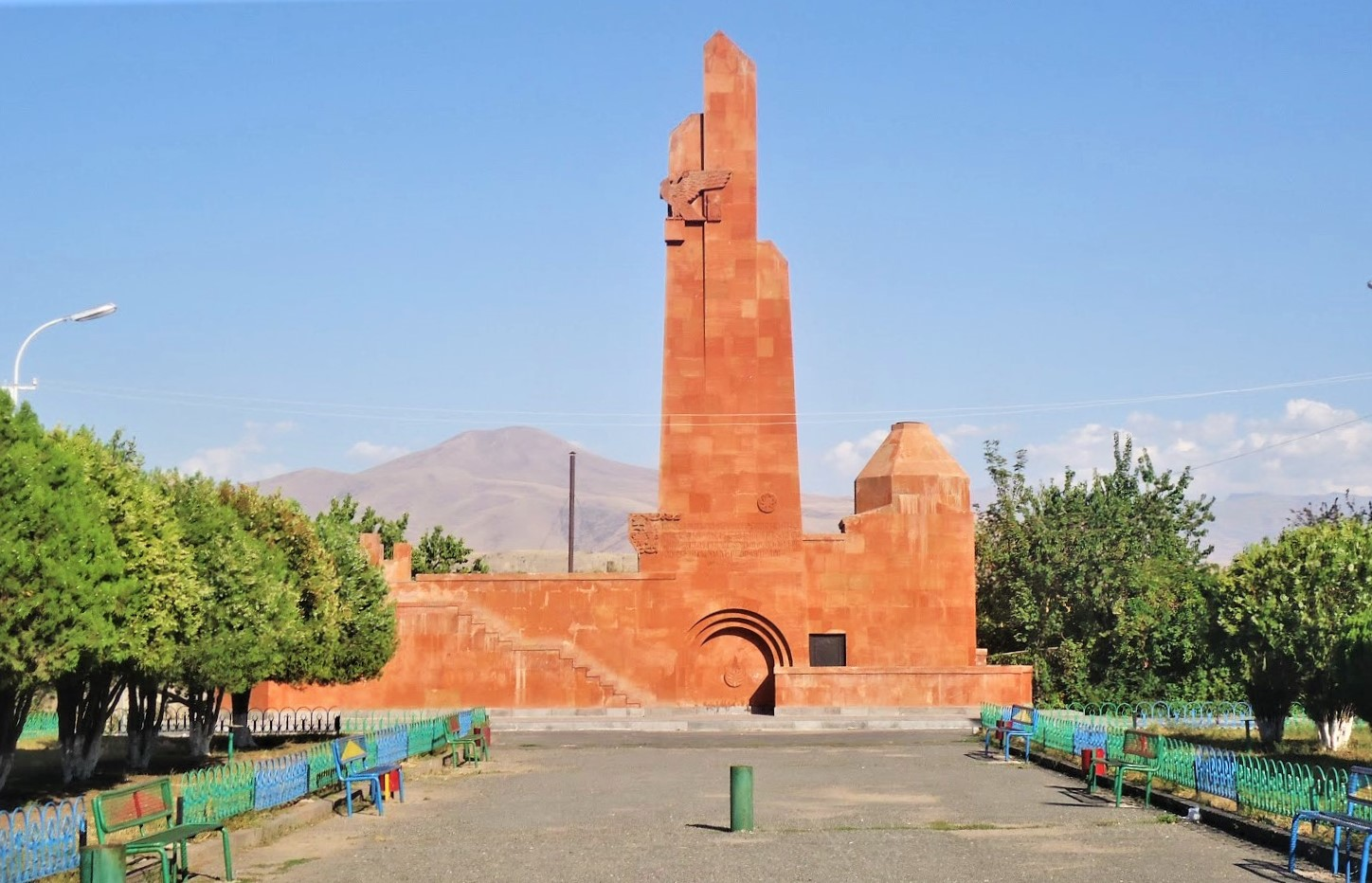
Nor Hachn Memorial (1974)

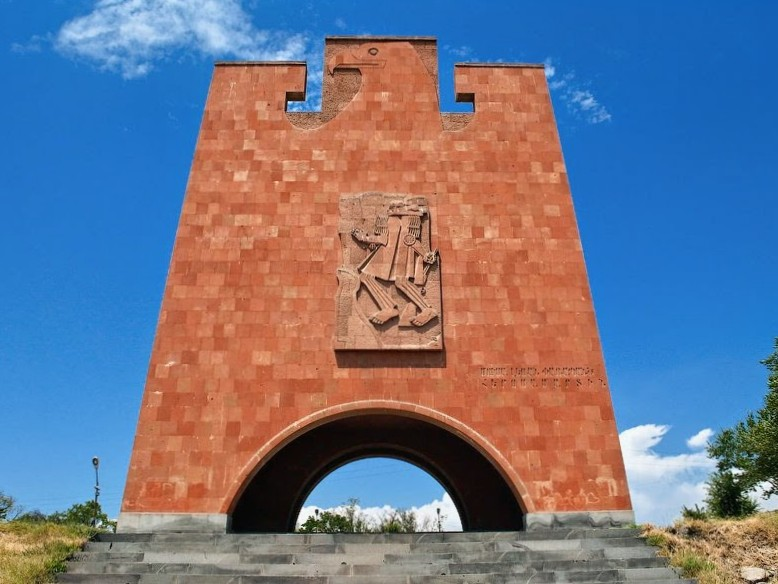
Musa Dagh (Musa Ler) Memorial (1976)

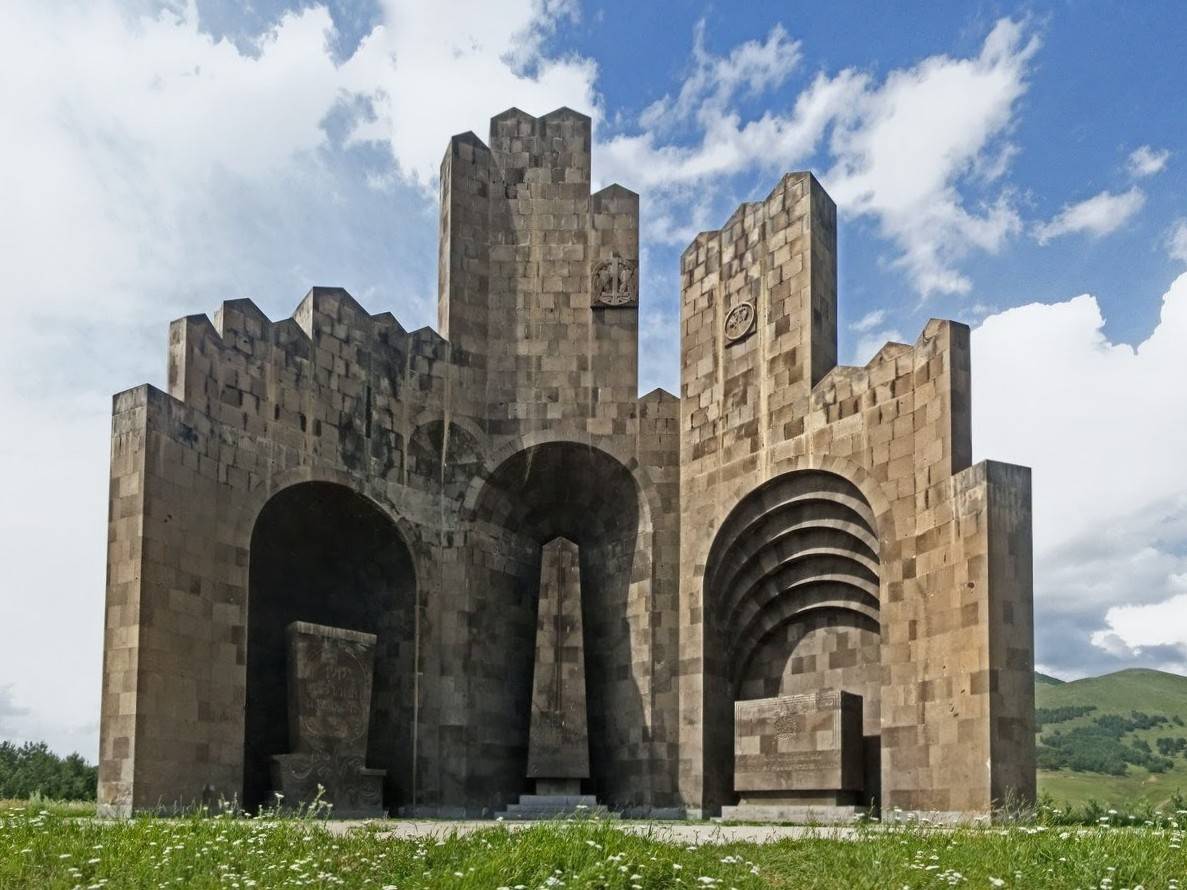
Bash-Aparan Memorial (1979)

=== Religious ===
Israyelian designed two altars for Etchmiadzin Cathedral, Armenia's mother church: the Main Altar (1958) and the Altar of Descent (1962).

From 1969 to 1972 or 1973 the summer residence of the Catholicos of All Armenians, known as Haykashen, was built in Byurakan according to Israyelian's design. The Catholicos often hosted guests at the residency.

Israyelian designed several Armenian churches both in Armenia and abroad. In Yerevan he designed reconstructions of two churches: St. Sargis and Saint John the Baptist. Both were completed after Israyelian's death. St. Sargis, which was entirely reconstructed, was completed in 1976. Architect Artsrun Galikyan further contributed to the design after Israyelian's death. The reconstruction of Saint John the Baptist church, designed by Israyelian, was completed in the 1980s. The reconstruction works were further developed by Baghdasar Arzoumanian and engineer Avetik Teknejian.

Israyelian designed and co-designed three churches in the Armenian diaspora: Holy Forty Martyrs Church in Milan, Italy (1958), St. Vartan Armenian Cathedral in New York City (1968), and Surp Nerses Shnorhali Cathedral in Montevideo, Uruguay (1968). The church in Milan was co-designed with Armenian-American architect Zareh Sourian, while the church in Montevideo with Varazdat Harutyunyan.

St. Vartan is the first Armenian cathedral built in the U.S. It is based on classical Armenian church architecture, namely Saint Hripsime Church in Ejmiatsin. According to some sources, it was designed by Walker O. Cain, however, the Armenian church publication indicates Israyelian as its architect. Varazdat Harutyunyan noted that Israyelian's design was only modified slightly. According to the website dedicated to Israyelian, it was designed by Israyelian, but because he could not travel to the US, its construction was supervised by Édouard Utudjian.

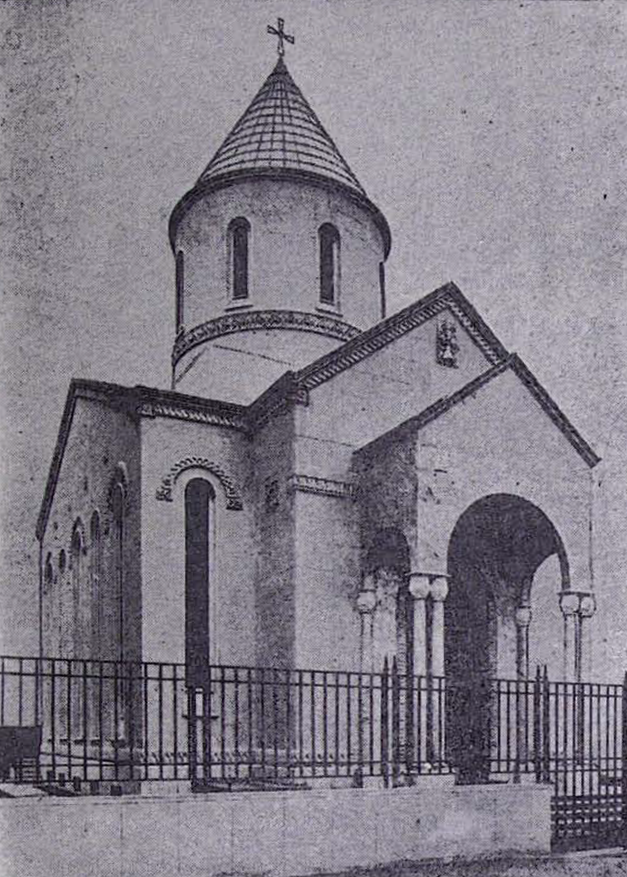
Forty Martyrs Church in Milan (1958)

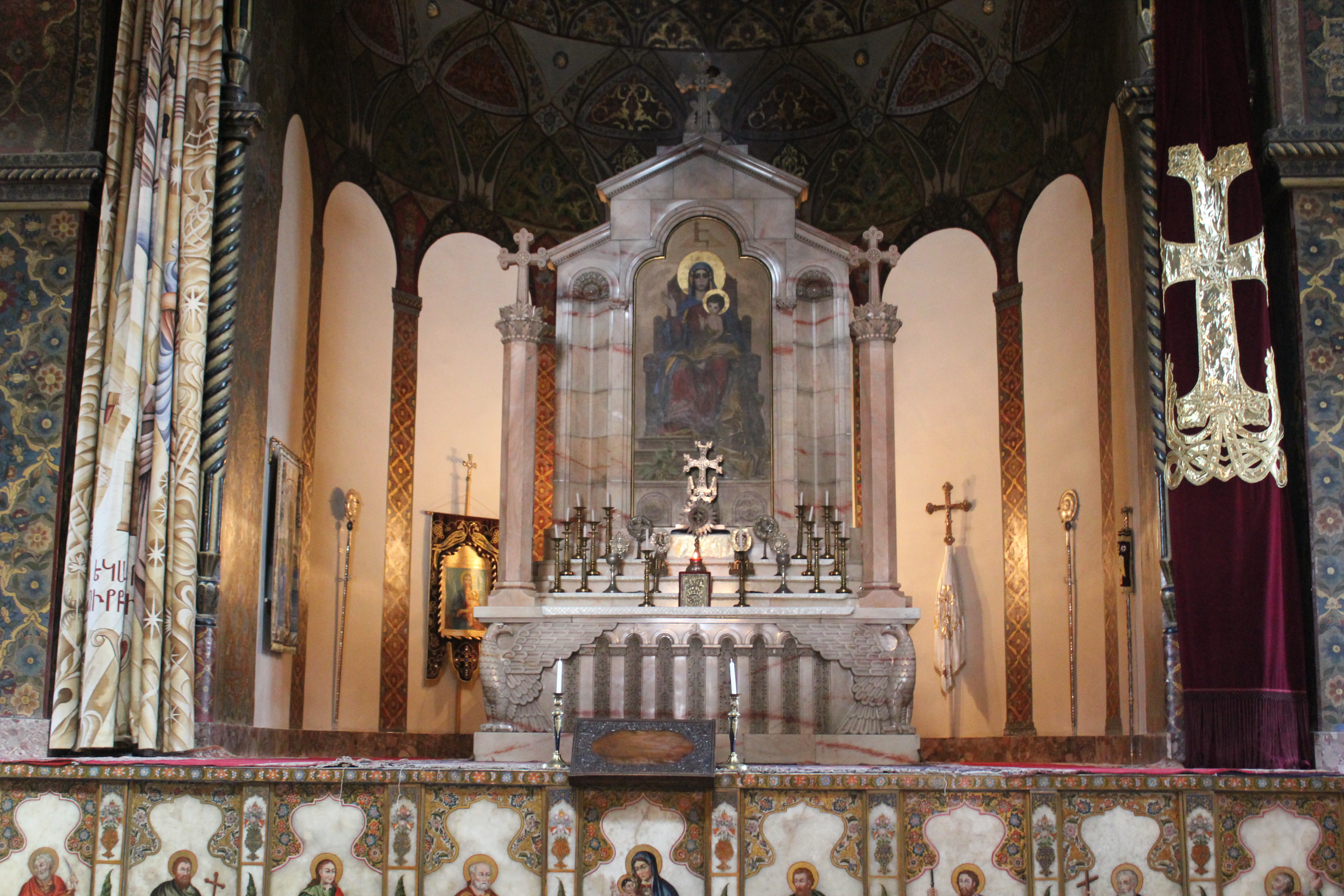
Main Altar of Etchmiadzin Cathedral (1958)

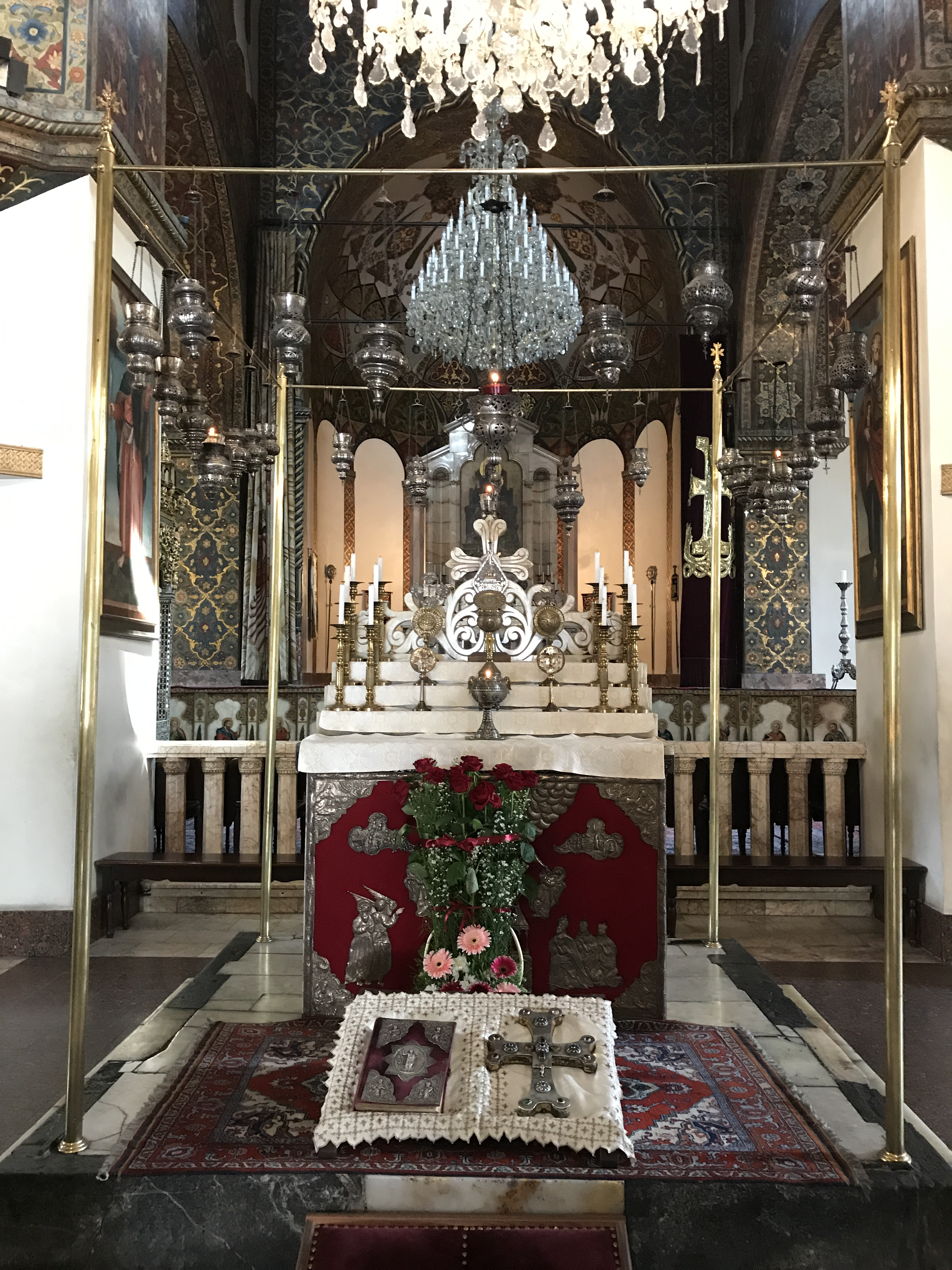
Altar of Descent of Etchmiadzin (1962)

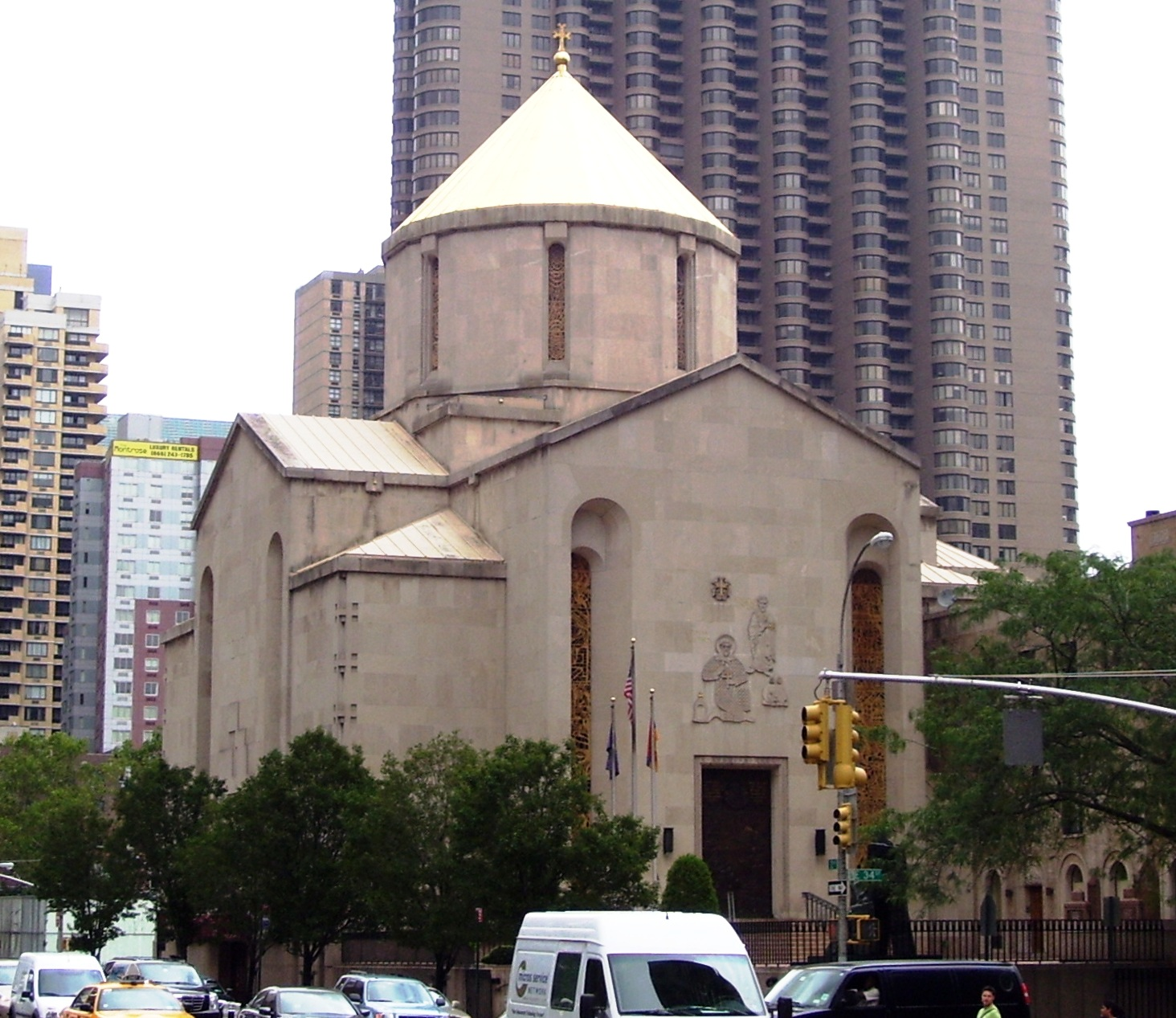
St. Vartan, New York (1968)

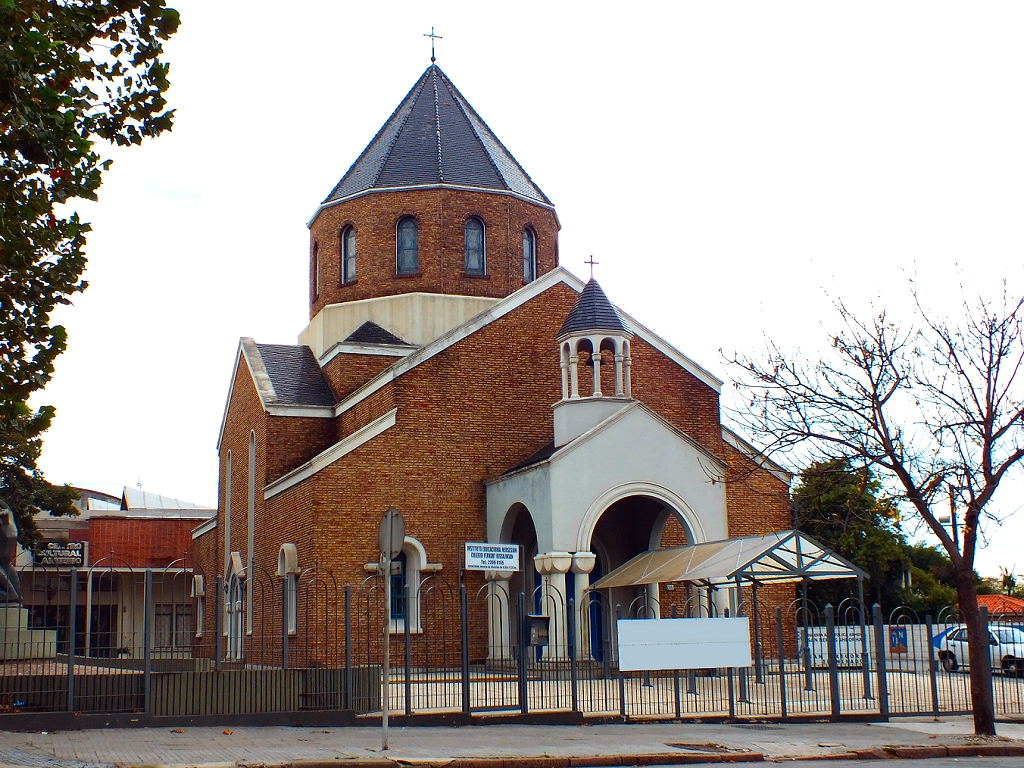
St. Nerses Shnorhali, Montevideo (1968)

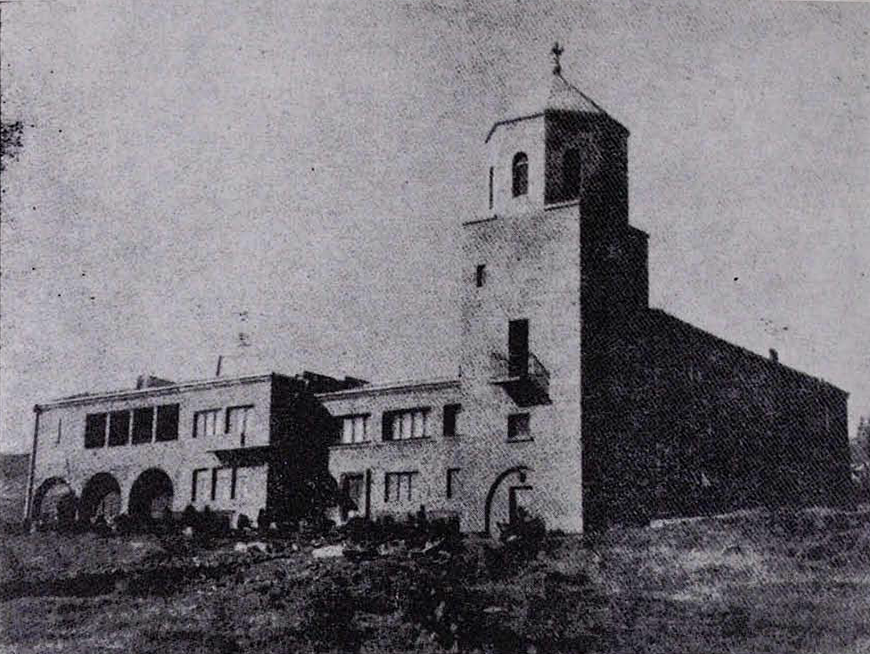
Haykashen (1971)

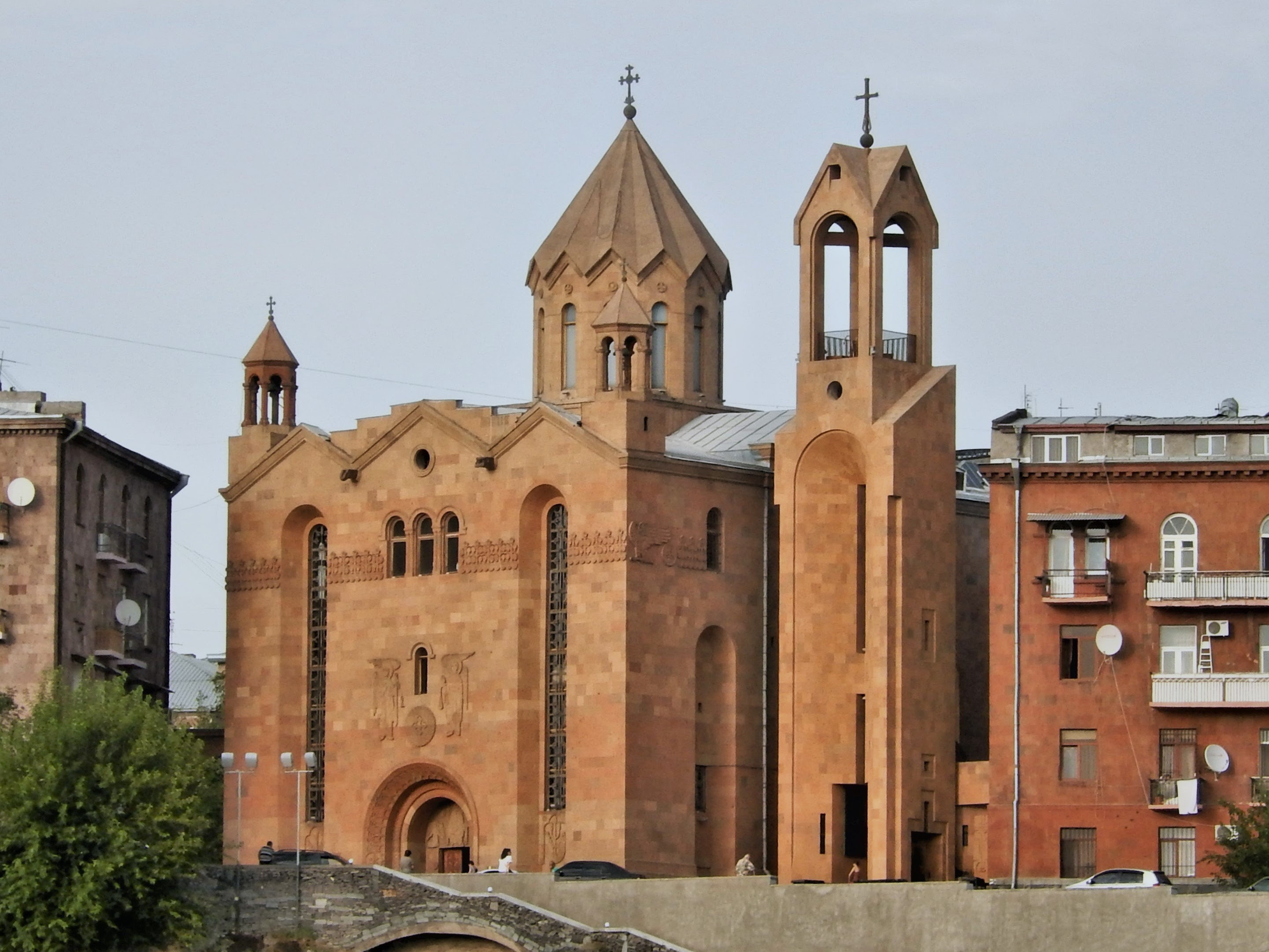
St. Sargis, Yerevan (1976, reconstruction)

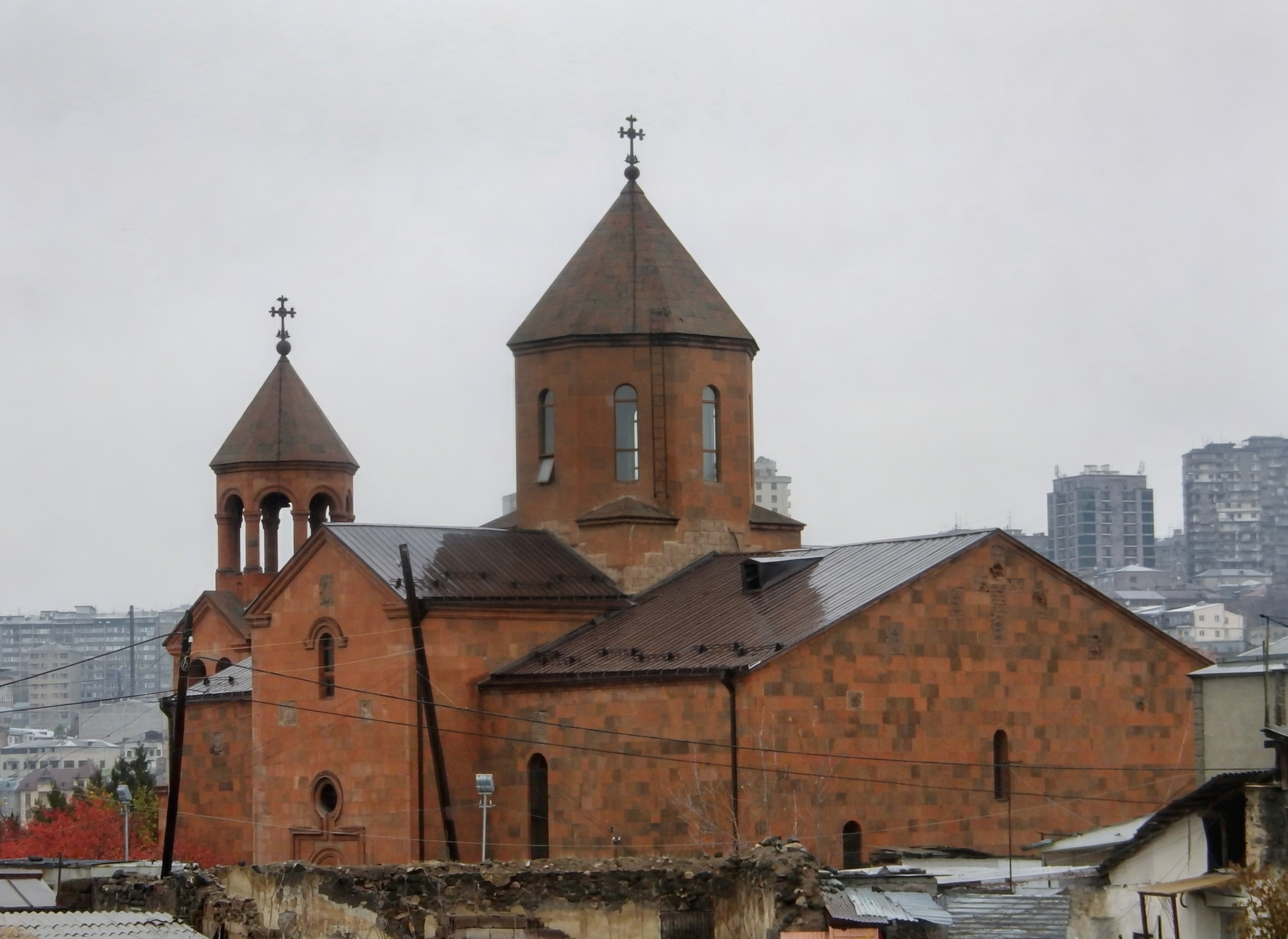
St. John the Baptist (1980s, reconstruction)

=== Monuments ===
Israyelian designed two structures at Victory Park in Yerevan. The first is the pedestal for the statue of Stalin (removed in 1962), which has served as a museum of "Great Patriotic War" (World War II). It was completed in 1950. It is now also the pedestal of the monument Mother Armenia (erected in 1967). The second is the main entrance to the same park, completed a decade after his death, in 1982.

Israyelian designed several popular monuments near prominent landmarks of Armenia. In 1957 "Eagle of Zvartnots", created with Yervand Kochar, near the seventh century Zvartnots Cathedral. In the same year, on a small hill on the road to the temple of Garni, a monument known as Charents Arch was erected. It offers a panoramic view of Mount Ararat. It is often referred to as the "Arch of Ararat". Lines from a Yeghishe Charents poem glorifying the mountain are inscribed into the monument. The "Lion of Geghard" was erected near the monastery of Geghard in 1958. It was sculpted by Ara Harutyunyan. The monument is inspired by the coat of arms of the Proshian noble family found inside Geghard.

In 1960 a monument conventionally known as the "Western Entrance of Yerevan" was erected in the outskirts of Yerevan, facing those entering the capital from the west (i.e. from the direction of Vagharshapat/Ejmiatsin).

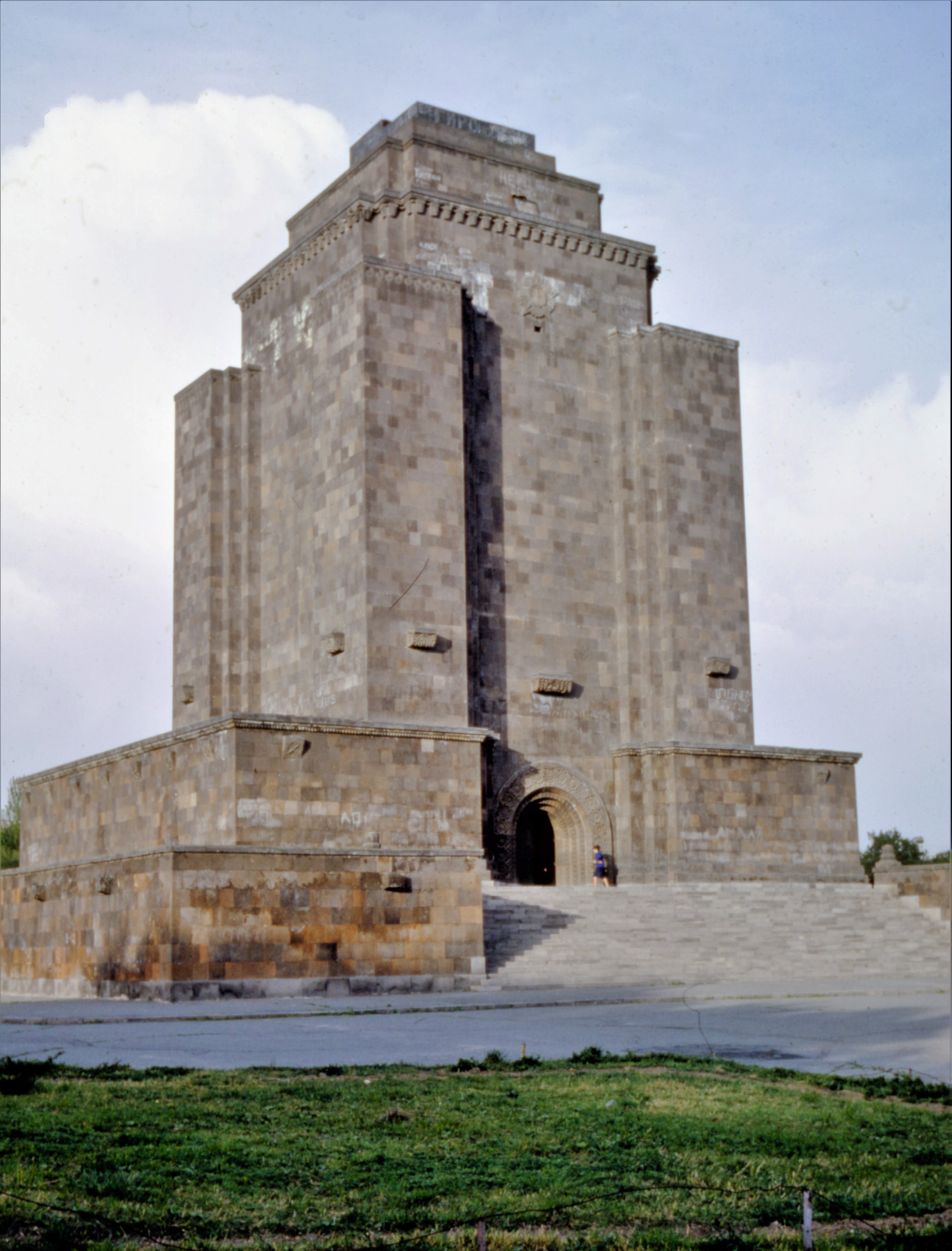
World War II Museum (1950) (Note: pictured here between 1962 and 1967, following the removal of Stalin's statue and prior to the erection of the Mother Armenia statue)

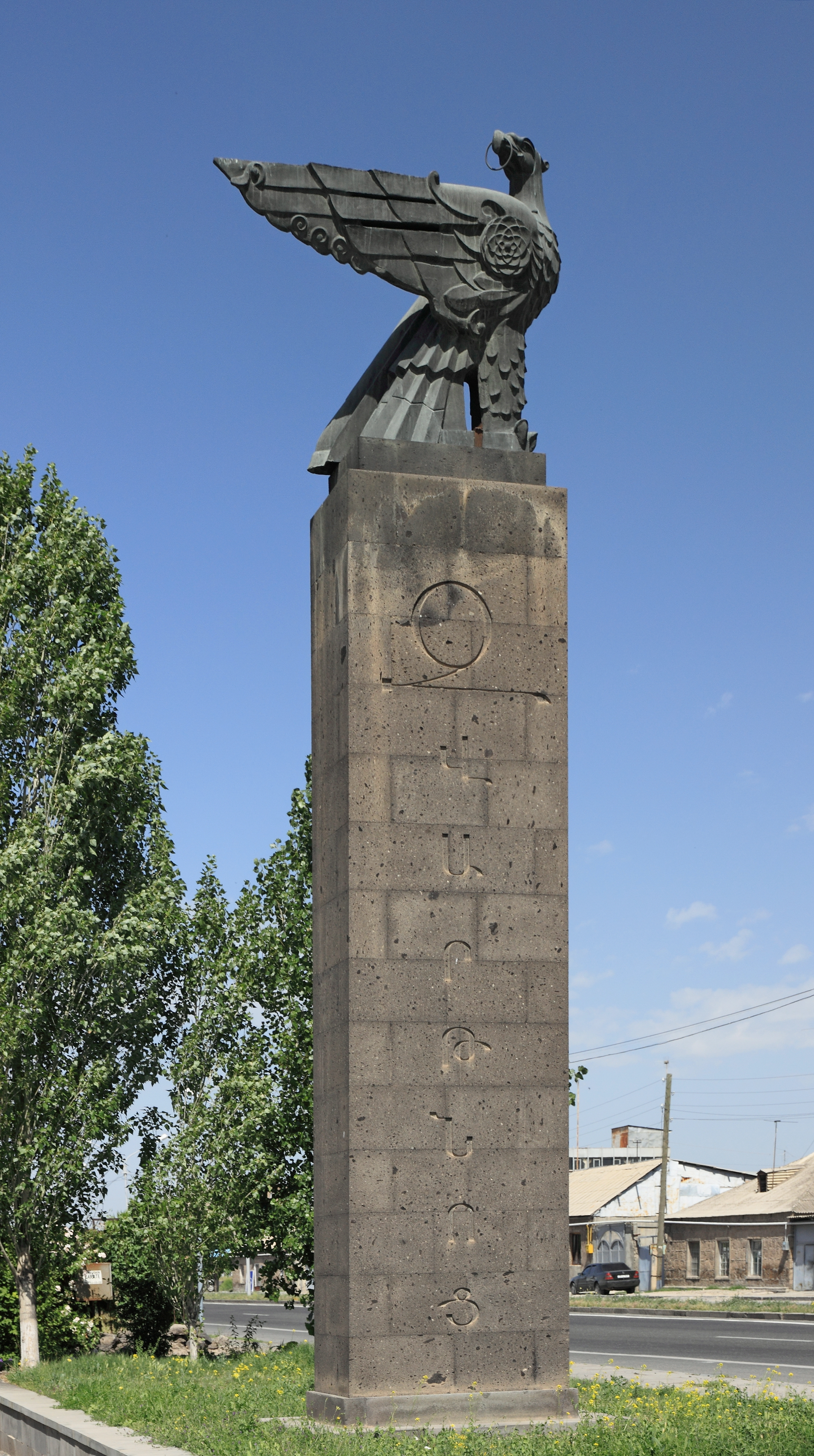
Eagle of Zvartnots (1957)

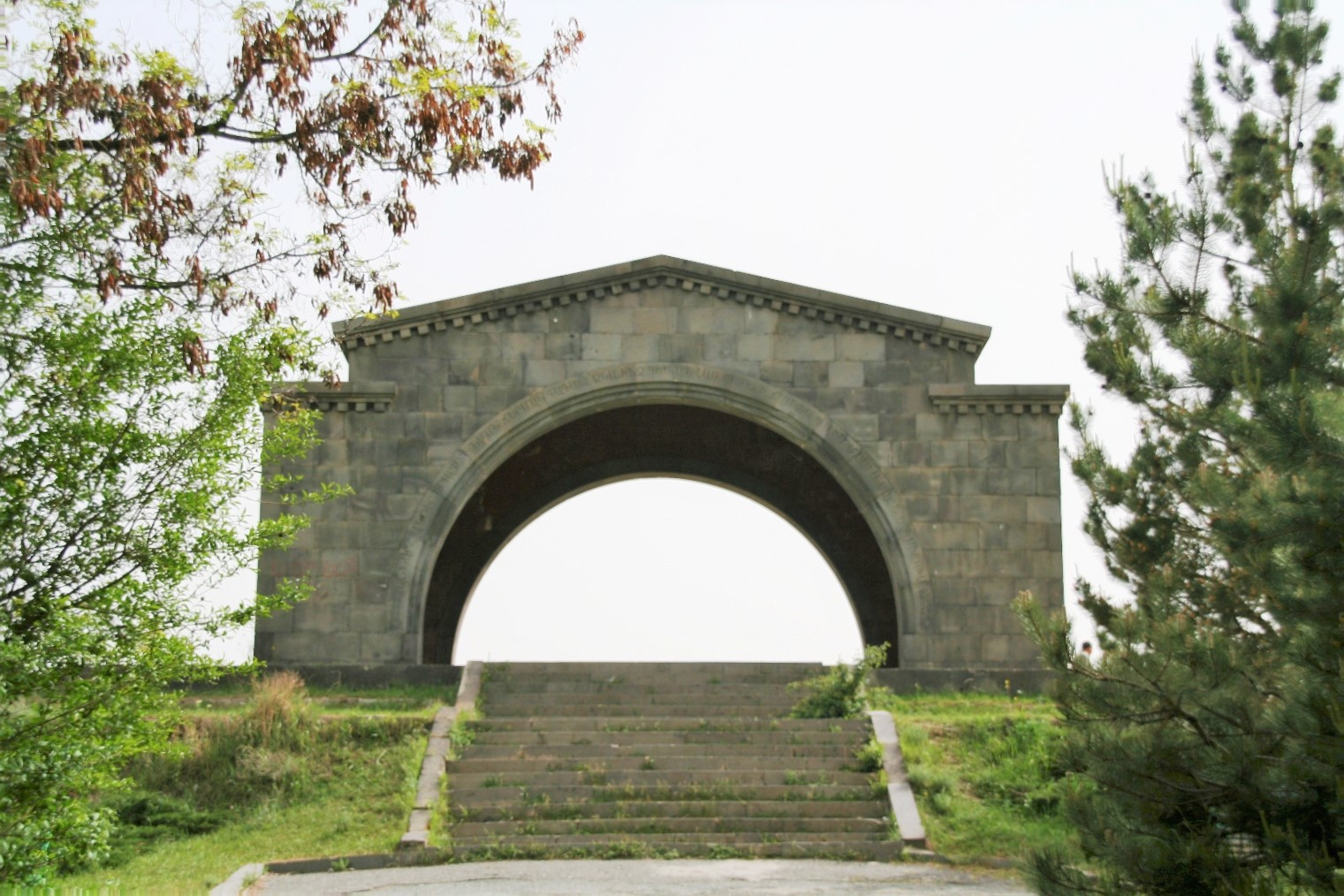
Arch of Charents (1957)

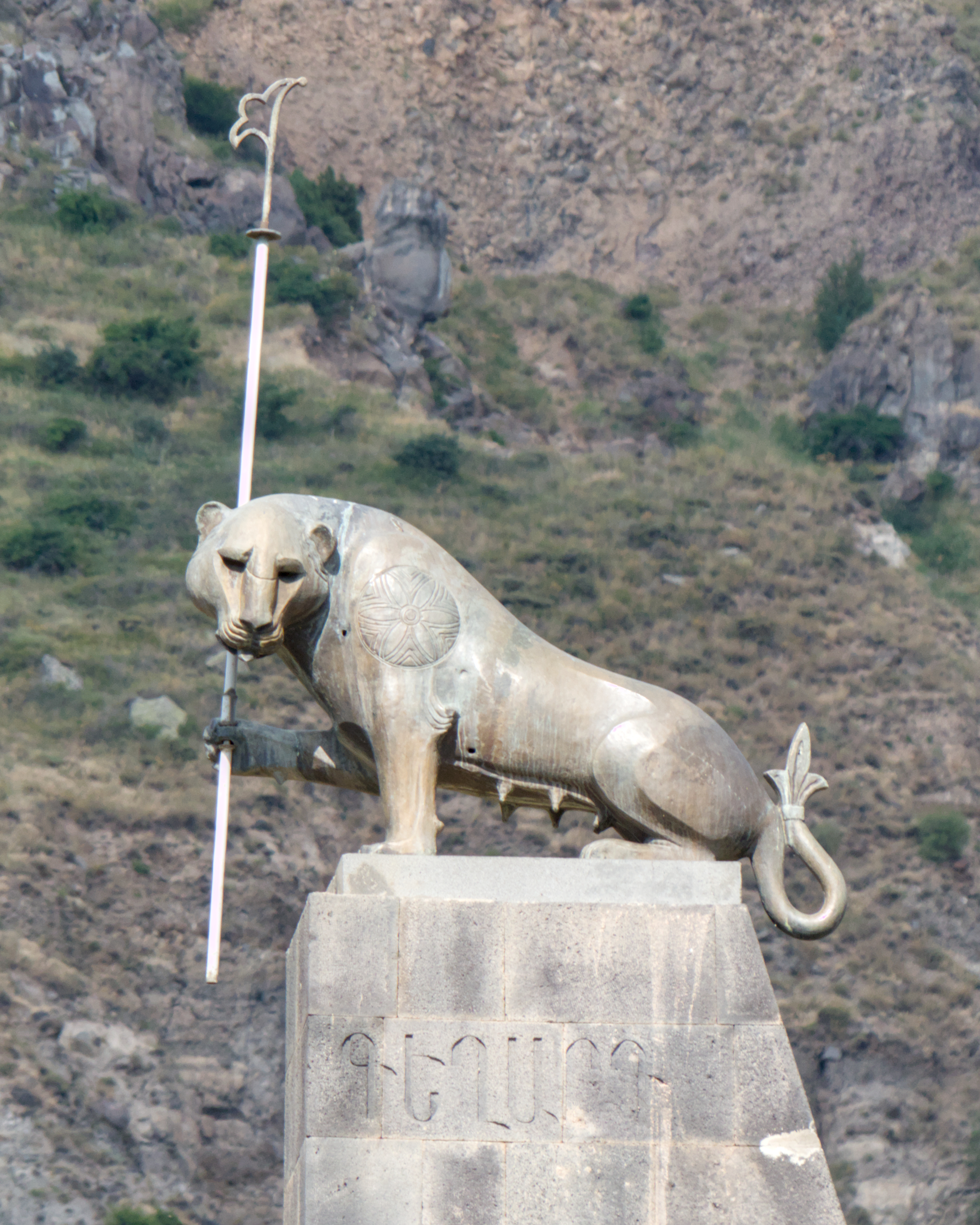
Lion of Geghard (1958)

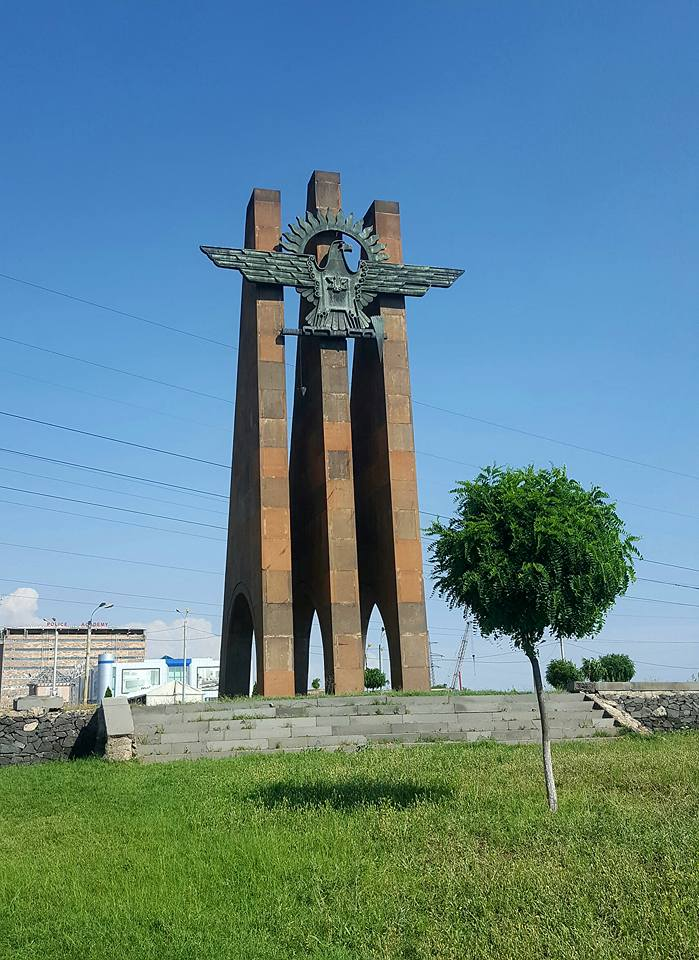
Western Entrance of Yerevan (1960)

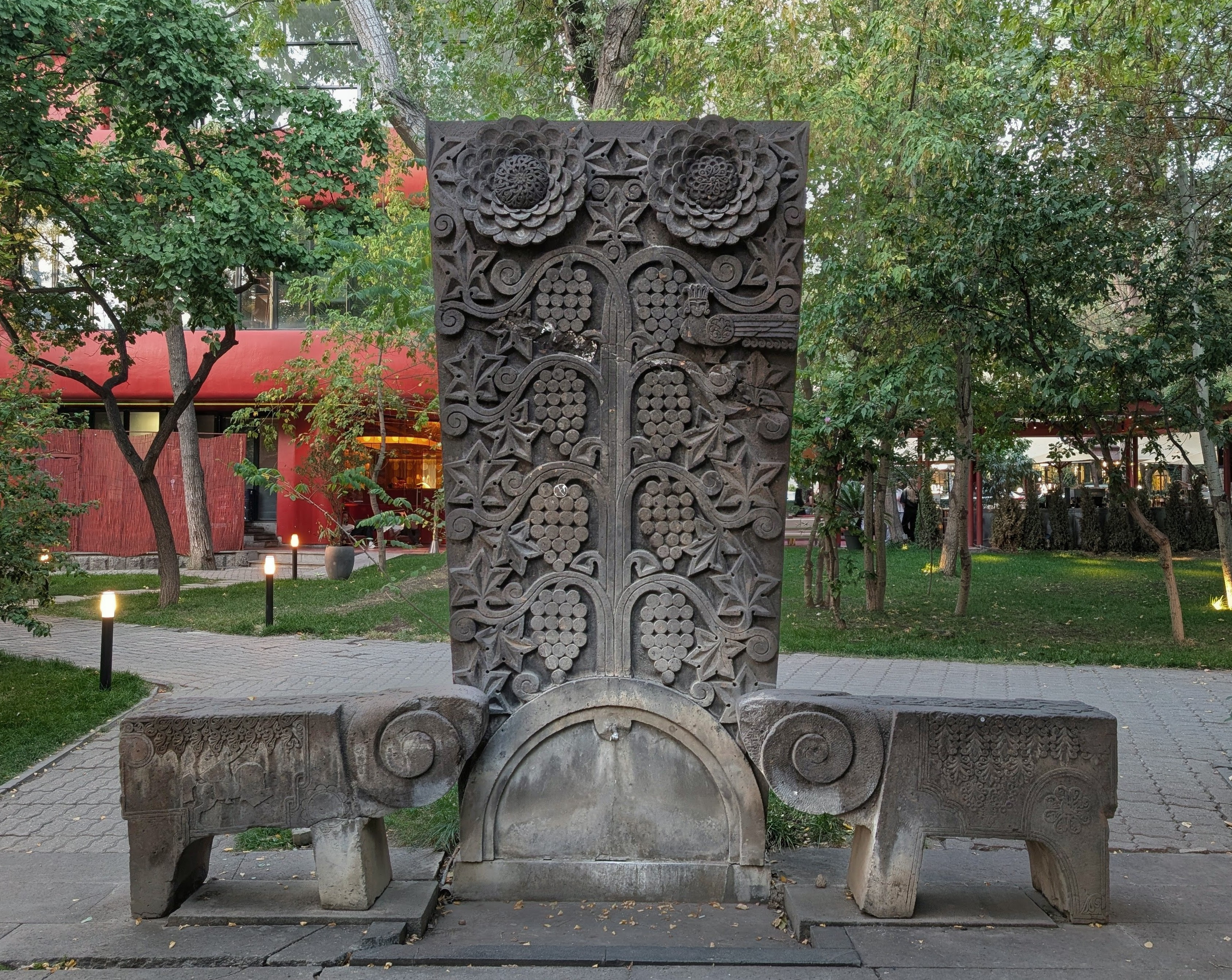
Monument of friendship of Yerevan and Carrara (1964)

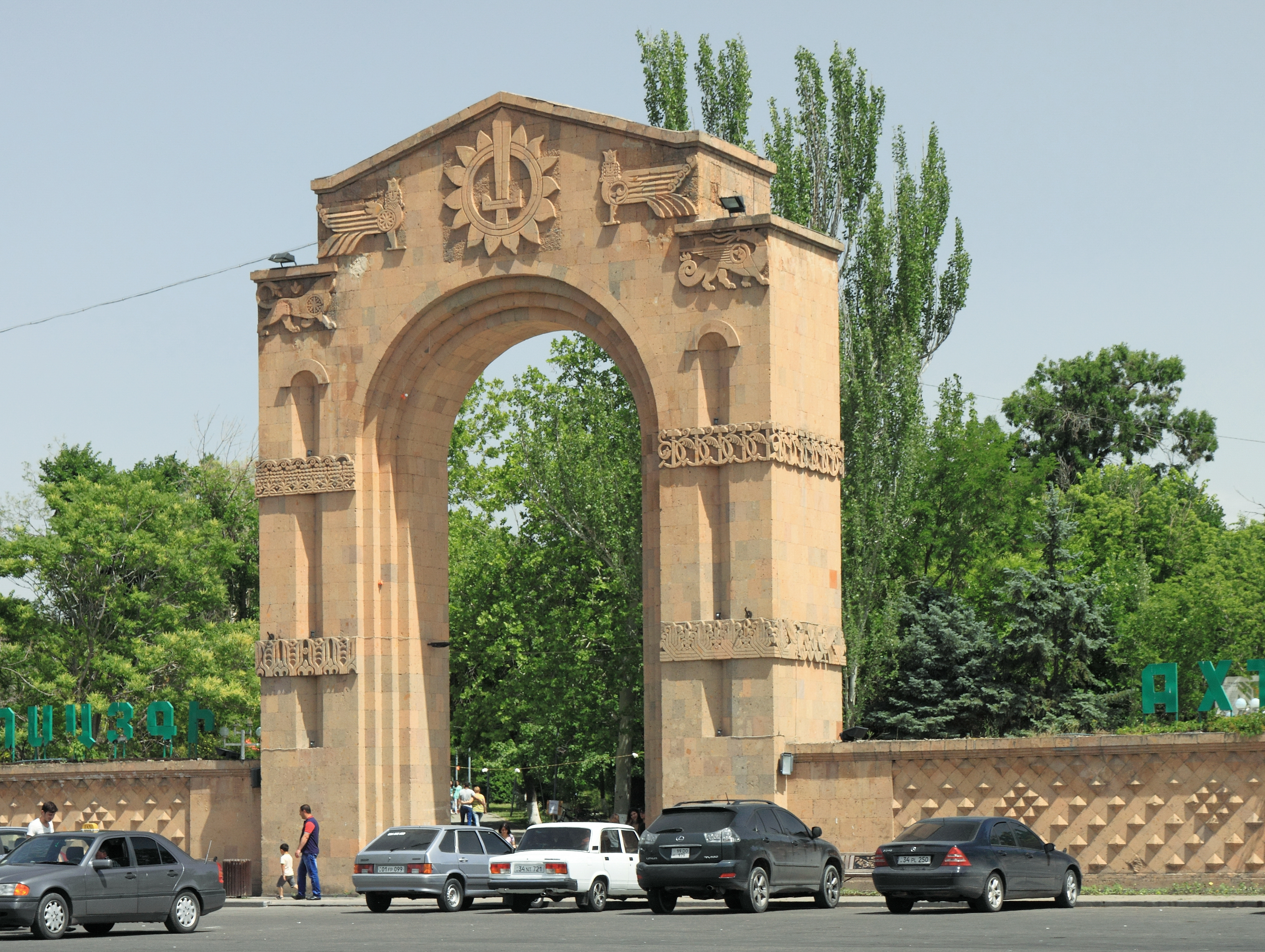
Entrance of Victory Park (1982)

=== Other buildings ===
Israyelian designed a number of structures and buildings for civic use. They include the Ararat Wine Factory in Yerevan (1937–1961); the Kheres Wine Factory in Oshakan (1950s); the Hrazdan Gorge Aqueduct in Yerevan (1950), with engineer G. Yeghoyan; Government House #2 in Yerevan's Republic Square (1955, with Samvel Safaryan and Varazdat Arevshatyan), the building of the Union of Artists of Armenia in Yerevan (1955–56); the Ethnographic Museum of Armenia near the Sardarapat Memorial (1977–78). His design for Kevork Chavoush Museum in Ashnak village was completed in the 1980s.

He also designed restaurants in Yerevan ("Aragil", 1957/1960), Hrazdan ("Tsovinar", 1960), and Vanadzor ("Kars", 1965). Israyelian designed decorative drinking fountains at the courtyards of St. Hripsime (1958), Geghard (1958/59), Etchmiadzin Cathedral (1967), St. Gayane (1972), and in numerous villages and towns around Armenia (1943–46), including Parakar, Karbi, Stepanavan, Sisian, Byurakan, Artik, Goris, Ashtarak, Alaverdi, and Taperakan.

He also designed some of the buildings of the Kanaker Aluminium Plant (KanAZ) in 1948–50, a campus of the Yerevan Physics Institute on the slopes of Mount Aragats (1960), a large hotel (pansionat) in Sochi, Russia (1977), several residential buildings in Yerevan and other structures.

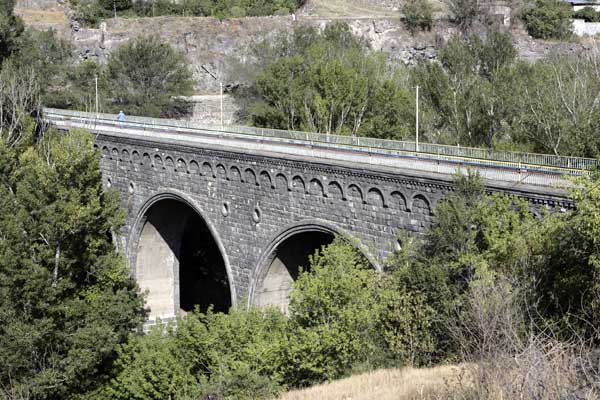
Hrazdan Aqueduct (1950)

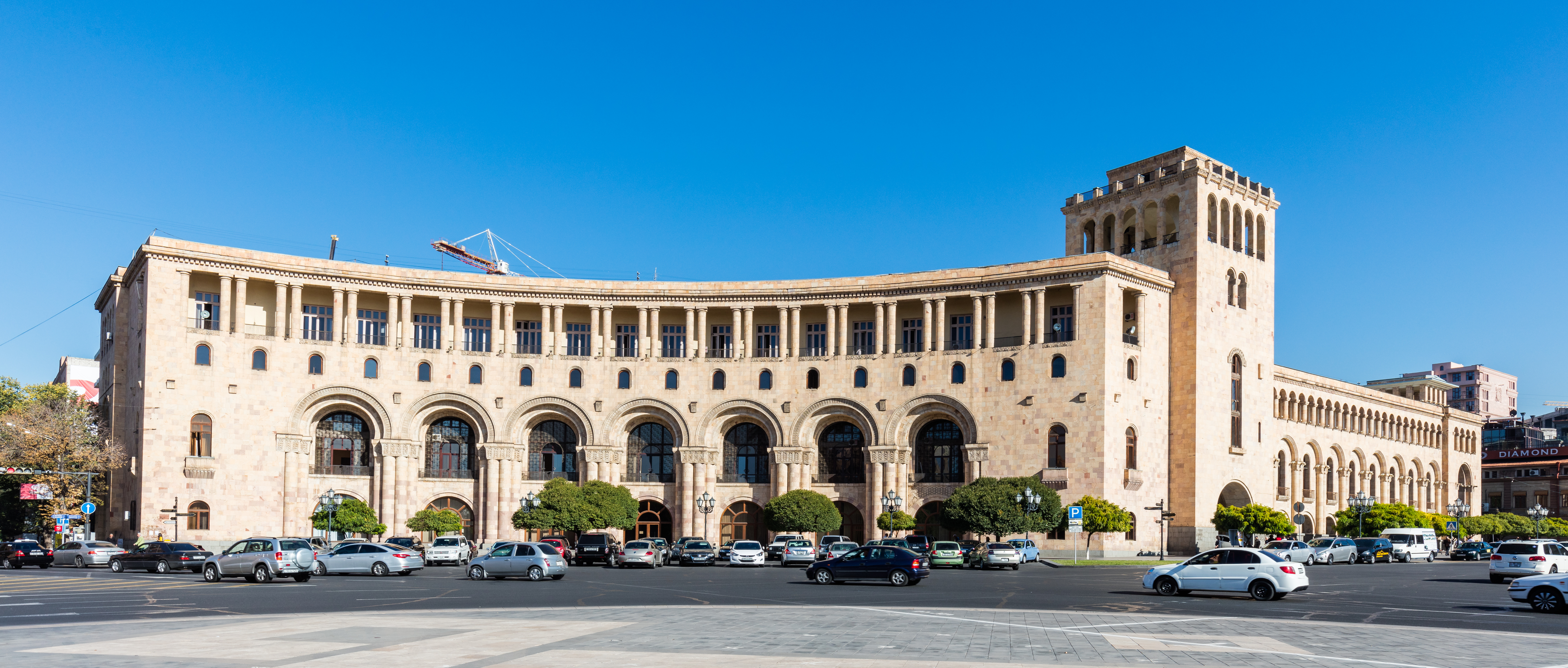
Government House #2 (1955)

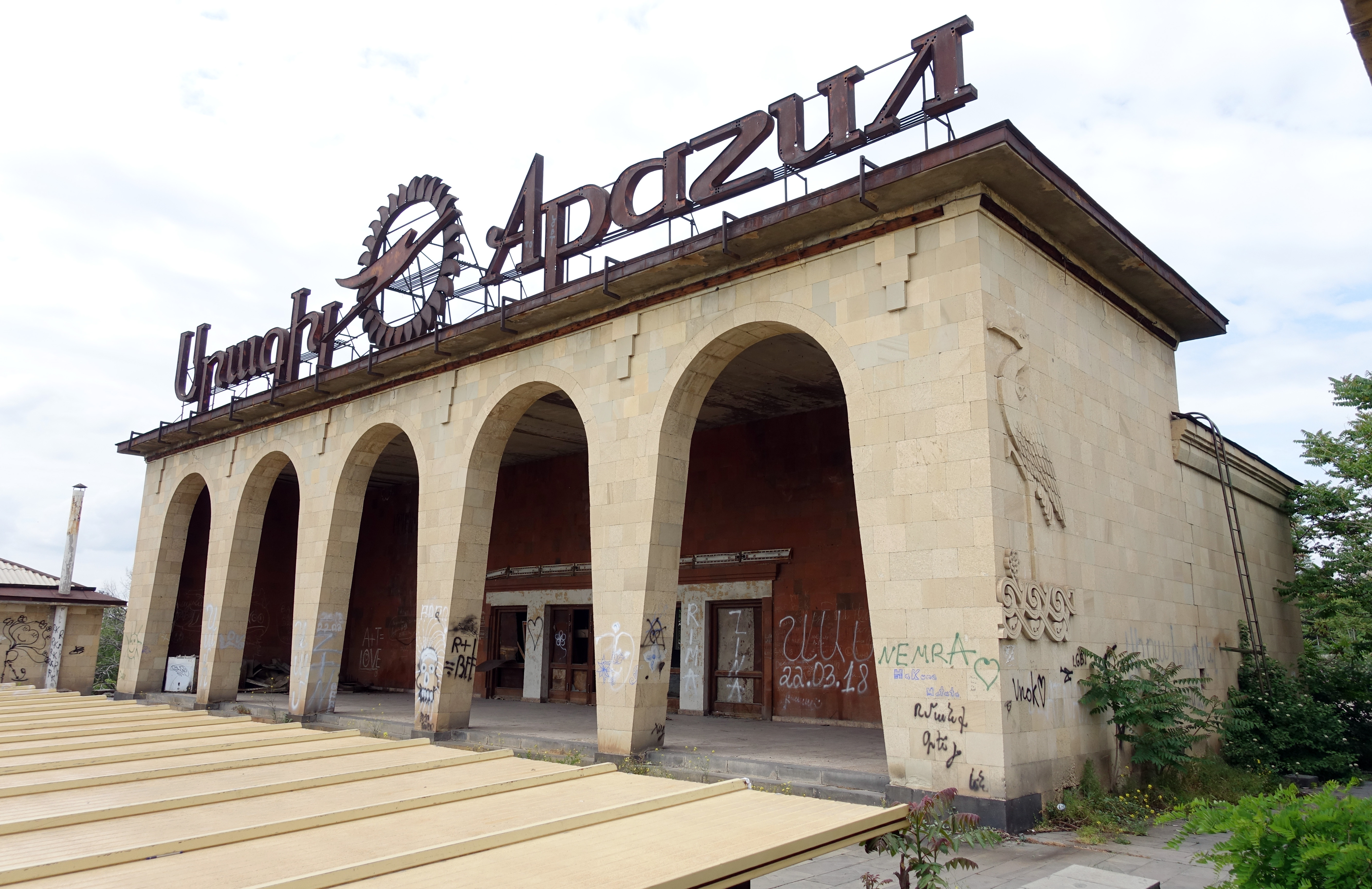
Aragil Restaurant (1957–60)

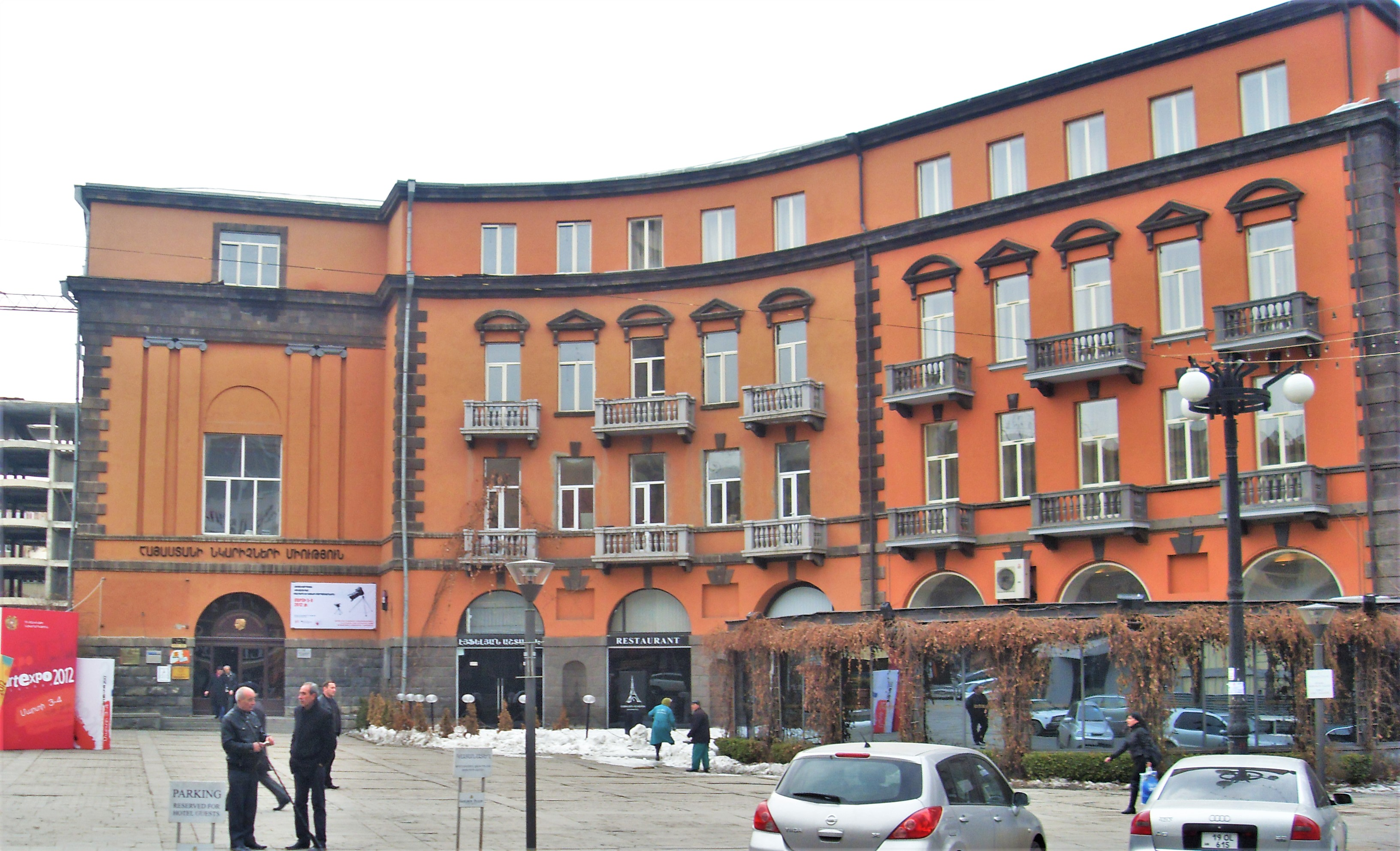
Union of Artists of Armenia (1956)

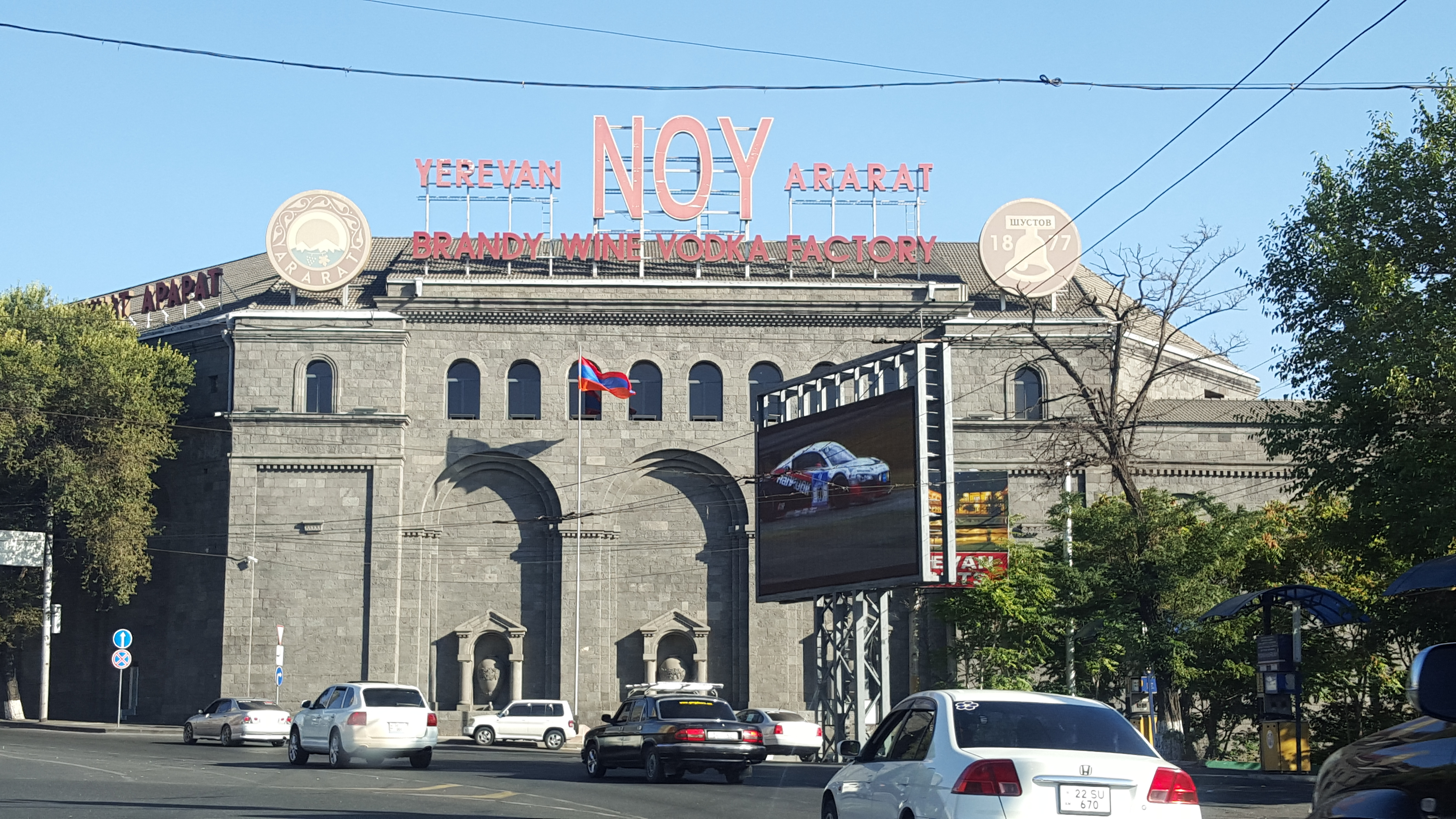
Ararat Wine Factory (1937–1961)

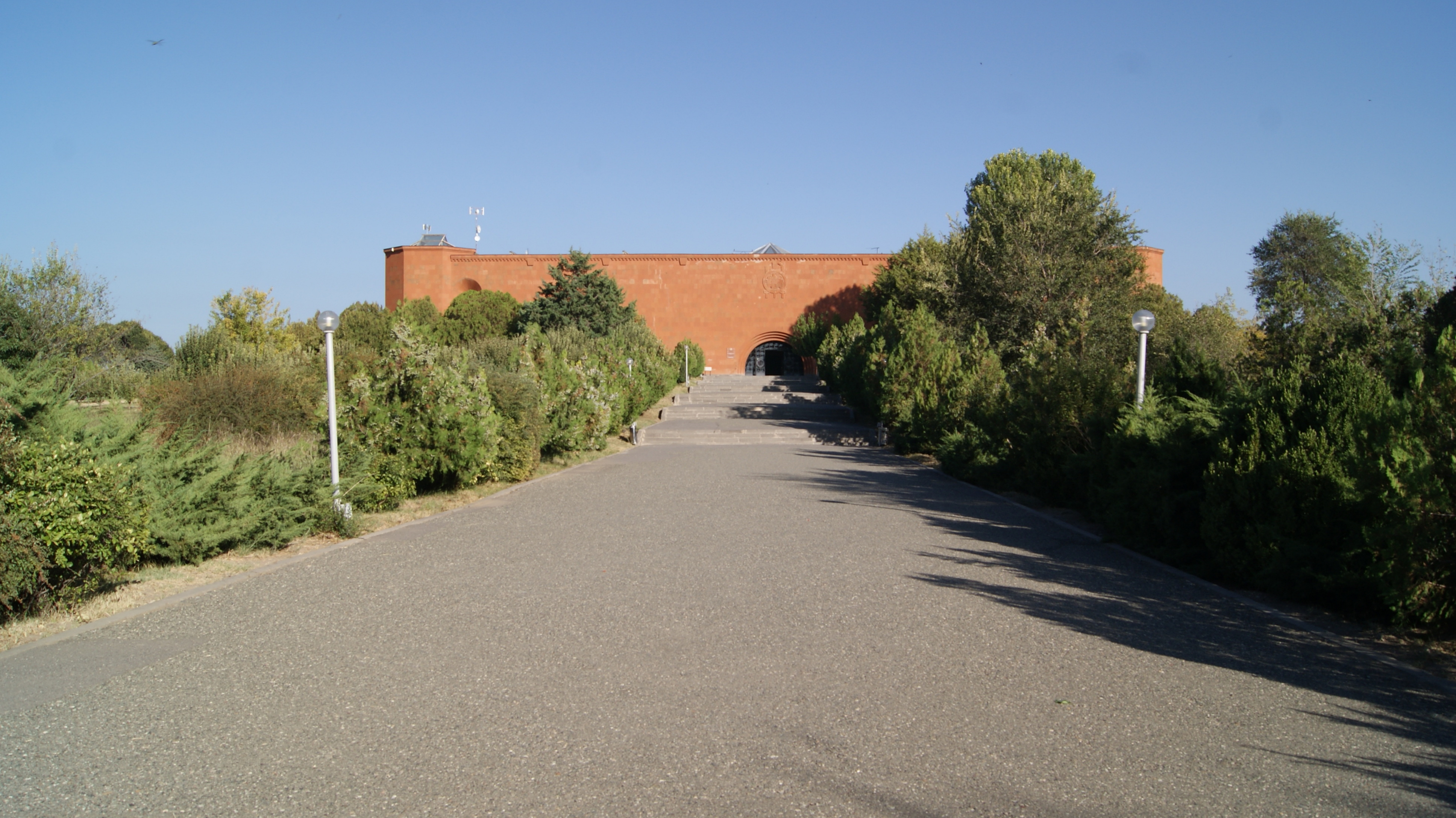
Ethnographic Museum of Armenia (1978)

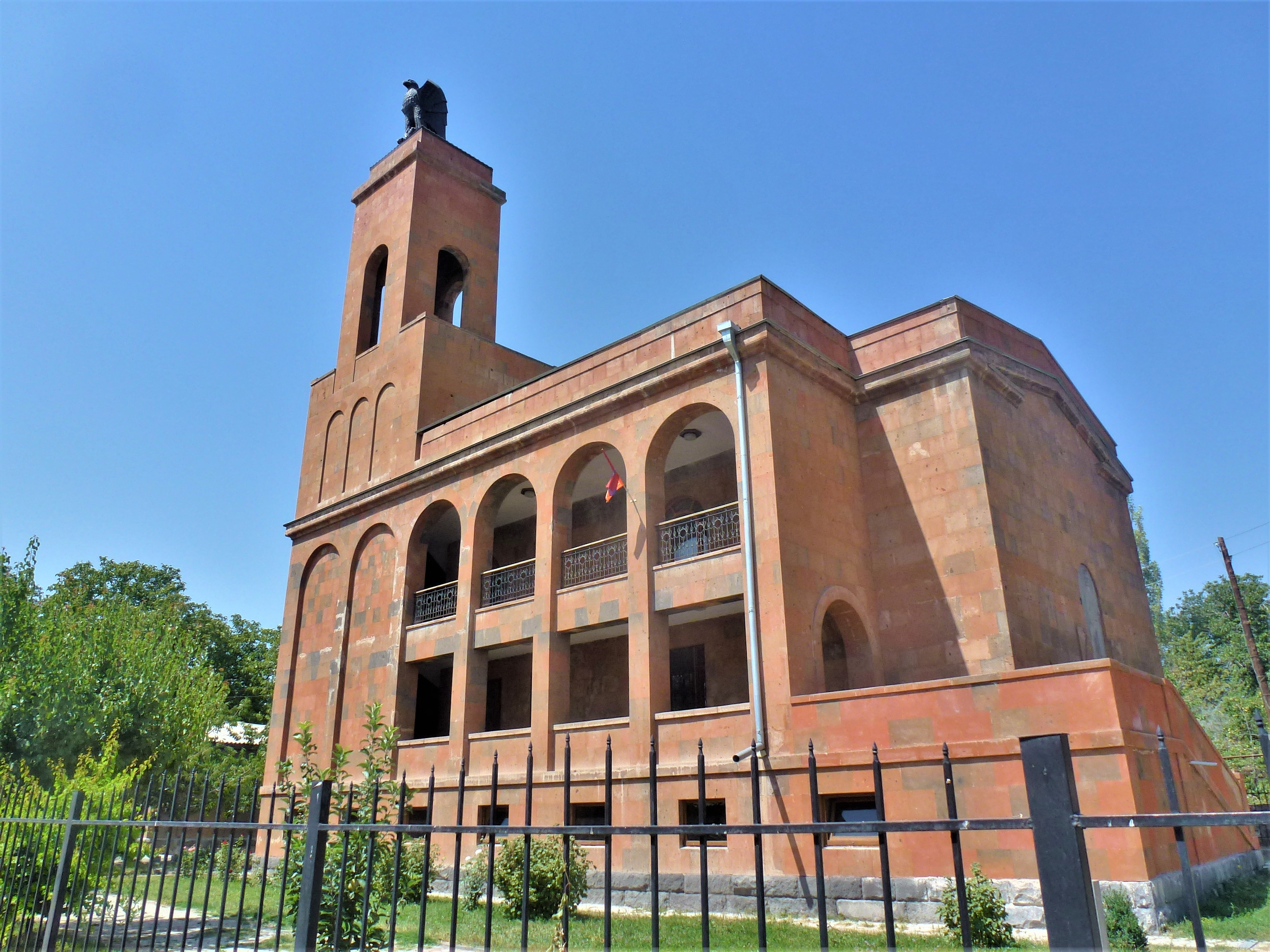
Kevork Chavoush Museum (1980s)

== Legacy and recognition ==
Martiros Saryan and Artashes Hovsepyan created portraits of Israyelian. Grigor Khanjyan depicted him in the mural Revived Armenia (1999-2000). A street in Yerevan was named after him.

In mid-2000s Israyelian's son Vahagn proposed to turn the second floor of Israyelian's house at 9 Saryan St. in Yerevan into a house-museum. The house, designed and built by himself, was demolished in October 2011 to make way for a hotel. The Municipality of Yerevan stated that Israyelian's son, Vahagn, had sold the house earlier and gave formal permission to demolish it.

As of 2025, there is no memorial honoring Israyelian, although it was discussed in 2020. His archives have been donated to the National Museum and Institute of Architecture.

== Awards ==
Israyelian was awarded:

- Stalin Prize (1951)
- Honored worker of art of the Armenian SSR (1961)
- Honored Architect of Armenian SSR (1968)
- People's Architect of the USSR (1970)

Military awards

- Medal "For the Defence of the Caucasus"
- Medal "For the Victory over Germany in the Great Patriotic War 1941–1945"
