= Zabel Yesayan =

Armenian writer

Zabel Yesayan Զապէլ Եսայեան
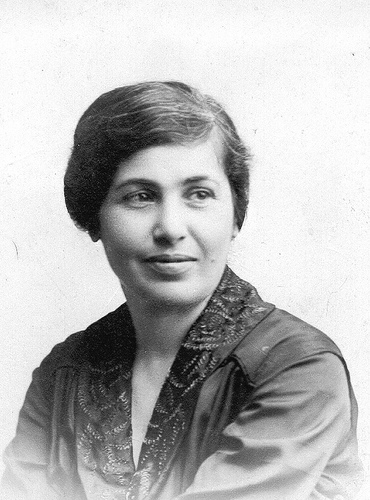
- Born: 4 February 1878; Scutari, Constantinople, Ottoman Empire
- Died: 1943 (aged 65); Siberia, Russian SFSR, Soviet Union
- Education: Sorbonne University
- Occupations: Novelist, poet, writer, and teacher.
- Spouse: Dikran Yesayan
- Children: Sophie; Hrant

Signature
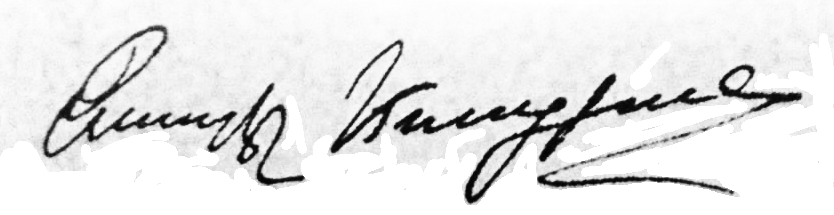

Zabel Yesayan (Armenian: Զապել Եսայան (reformed), Զապէլ Եսայեան (classical); 4 February 1878 – 1943) was an Armenian writer and a prominent figure in the Armenian academic and political community during the late nineteenth and early twentieth centuries.

Zabel Yesayan's books, articles, and speeches cover a range of topics such as the Adana massacre, Armenian genocide, and commentary on the status of Armenian women. Yesayan also worked as a translator in France as well as a professor during her later years as an academic. Her novels and articles contributed to understanding the persecution of Turkish Armenians, the after effect of World War I, and women's roles and rights in the Ottoman and Armenian communities.

== Early life ==
Zabel Hovannessian, daughter of Mkrtich Hovannessian, was born on the night of February 4, 1878, in the Silahdar neighborhood of Scutari, Istanbul, during the height of the Russo-Turkish War. She attended Holy Cross (Ս. Խաչ) elementary school and graduated in 1892.

=== Student in Paris ===
In 1895 she was among the first women from Istanbul to study abroad, moving to Paris, where she studied literature and philosophy at the Sorbonne University in Paris, France. Inspired by the French Romantic movement and the nineteenth-century revival of Armenian literature in the Western Armenian dialect, she began what would become a prolific writing career. Her work also contributed to the Armenian intellectual movement called Zartonk (the awakening), along with other female authors such as Srpuhi Dussap and Zabel Asatur (Sibyl).

While in Paris, she married the painter Dikran Yesayan (1874-1921). They had two children, Sophie and Hrant. After the Young Turk Revolution in 1908, Yesayan returned to Istanbul. In 1909, Yesayan was appointed to the Armenian Constantinople Patriarchate's Commission and sent to Cilicia to examine the situation. Yesayan published a series of articles in connection with the Adana massacres. The tragic fate of the Armenians in Cilicia is also the subject of her book In the Ruins (Աւերակներու մէջ, Istanbul 1911), the novella The Curse (1911), and the short stories "Safieh" (1911), and "The New Bride" (1911).

=== Early literary career ===
In late-nineteenth-century Constantinople, women including Srpuhi Dussap and Gayaneh Matakian hosted Armenian intellectual salons to provide a space for people to discuss ideas, literature, and politics. Salons also allowed women to interact with men without being labeled as improper women. Yesayan often visited the salon ran by Gayaneh Matakian. There, Yesayan met other writers and activists such as Sibyl and Arshak Chobanian, her first publisher. Yesayan published her first prose poem ("Ode to the Night")^{[1]} which appeared in Chobanian's periodical Tsaghik (Flower) in 1895. Yesayan's first novel Sbasman Srahin Mech (In the Waiting Room, 1903) also appeared in serial form in Tsaghik. The book discussed women's immigration and poverty in France. In 1903, the word Feminism first appeared in Armenian in Yesayan's publication on the Women's section in Tsaghik. She went on to publish short stories, literary essays, articles, and translations in both French and Armenian in periodicals such as Mercure de France, L'Humanité, Massis, Anahit, and Arevelian Mamoul (Eastern Press),Ecrit pour l'Art, La Grande France and in the Armenian Magazines Tzolk (Light), Mer Ugin (Our Way) and Arşav (Race).

== World War I and political activism ==
Yesayan in 1918

Attacks on Armenians in Ottoman Turkey during World War I left Yesayan's life in peril. She was the only woman on the list of Armenian intellectuals targeted for arrest and deportation by the Ottoman Young Turk government on April 24, 1915.

Yesayan evaded arrest and fled to Bulgaria and later to Baku and the Caucasus, where she worked with Armenian refugees documenting their eyewitness accounts of atrocities that had taken place during the Armenian genocide. Yesayan's son stayed with her mother in Constantinople while her husband and daughter were in France. Yesayan would be reunited with her family in France in 1919 after the war. After WWI, she went back to Cilicia with her children to help Armenian refugees and orphans.

Yesayan used her writing and voice to expose the wartime atrocities and to champion Armenian sovereignty and women's rights. One of her lesser known works, Krakedi Më Hishadagner (Memories of a Writer, 1915) written in Bulgaria, portrays Ottoman Turkish executions of prominent Armenians on April 24, 1915. Due to the danger that came with publishing the piece, Yesayan used the male pen-name Viken to hide her identity.

In 1918 Yesayan was in the Middle East organizing the relocation of refugees and orphans. This period of her life led to the novels The Last Cup (Վերջին բաժակը), and My Soul in Exile (Հոգիս աքսորեալ, 1919; translated into English by G.M. Goshgarian in 2014), where she exposes the many injustices she witnessed.

After the Armenian genocide, the Armenian National Delegation went to the Paris Peace Conference to make a case for Armenian sovereignty. Yesayan was elected to be a part of the Armenian National Delegation. In 1919 Yesayan gave a talk in French "The Role of the Armenian Woman during the War” (Հայ Կնոջ Դերը Պատերազմի Միջոցին), to show the peace delegates the devastation of the genocide as well as how Armenian women took up arms to protect themselves. During the Paris Peace Conference, Yesayan also met with the Inter-Allied Women's Conference to speak about the atrocities Armenian women faced as a result of the genocide. The Inter-Allied Women's Conference brought up Yesayan's testimony to the delegation as further evidence for the need for international women's rights.

Yesayan also spoke out for Armenian women, challenging traditional gender roles and social expectations such as education and labor. In the publications When They are No Longer in Love and The Last Cup (1917), Yesayan uses her works of fiction to discuss women's oppression. Yesayan, like other female activists, advocated for Armenian women to be a part of the public sphere.

== Move to Soviet Armenia ==
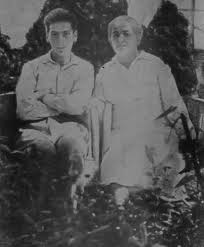
Zabel Yesayan with her son

Yesayan was an early supporter of Soviet Armenia and portrayed its social and political conditions in the novel Retreating Forces (Նահանջող ուժեր, 1923). Shortly after a visit to the republic in 1926, she published her impressions in Prometheus Unchained (Պրոմէթէոս ազատագրուած, Marseilles, 1928). In 1933, Yesayan decided to settle permanently in Soviet Armenia with her children, and in 1934 she took part in the first Soviet Writers' Union congress in Moscow. She taught French and Armenian literature at Yerevan State University and continued to write prolifically. She published a novella Shirt of Fire (Կրակէ շապիկ, Yerevan, 1934; translated into Russian in 1936) and her autobiographical book The Gardens of Silihdar (Սիլիհտարի պարտէզները, Yerevan, 1935; translated into English by Jennifer Manoukian in 2014).

During Joseph Stalin's Great Purge, Yesayan was accused of "counterrevolutionary agitation" and abruptly arrested by the Armenian NKVD on June 27, 1937. Her arrest occurred during the initial wave of repressions led by Armenian First Secretary Amatuni Amatuni, an ally of Lavrentii Beria. In addition to Yesayan, Amatuni oversaw the arrest of several other Armenian intellectuals close to the previous Armenian First Secretary Aghasi Khanjian, among them Yeghishe Charents, Axel Bakunts, and Vahan Totovents. Yesayan was held without trial for one and a half years. During her trial, she only admitted to having connections with individuals who were deemed "enemies of the people". Although she was originally condemned to death, her sentence was commuted to ten years' imprisonment. Yesayan was exiled to prisons spanning from Yerevan to Baku. She died under unknown circumstances. There is speculation that she drowned and died in exile in Siberia, sometime in 1943.

In 1956, during the Khrushchev Thaw, Yesayan's son, Hrant, requested that her case be reevaluated. During the subsequent re-investigation, one her cellmates, Karine Gyulikekhvyan testified that after each of Yesayan's interrogations, new accusations would be brought against her from the Soviet state. Yesayan's case was dismissed due to lack of evidence on September 27, 1956, and she was posthumously rehabilitated on January 9, 1957.

== Legacy and recognition ==
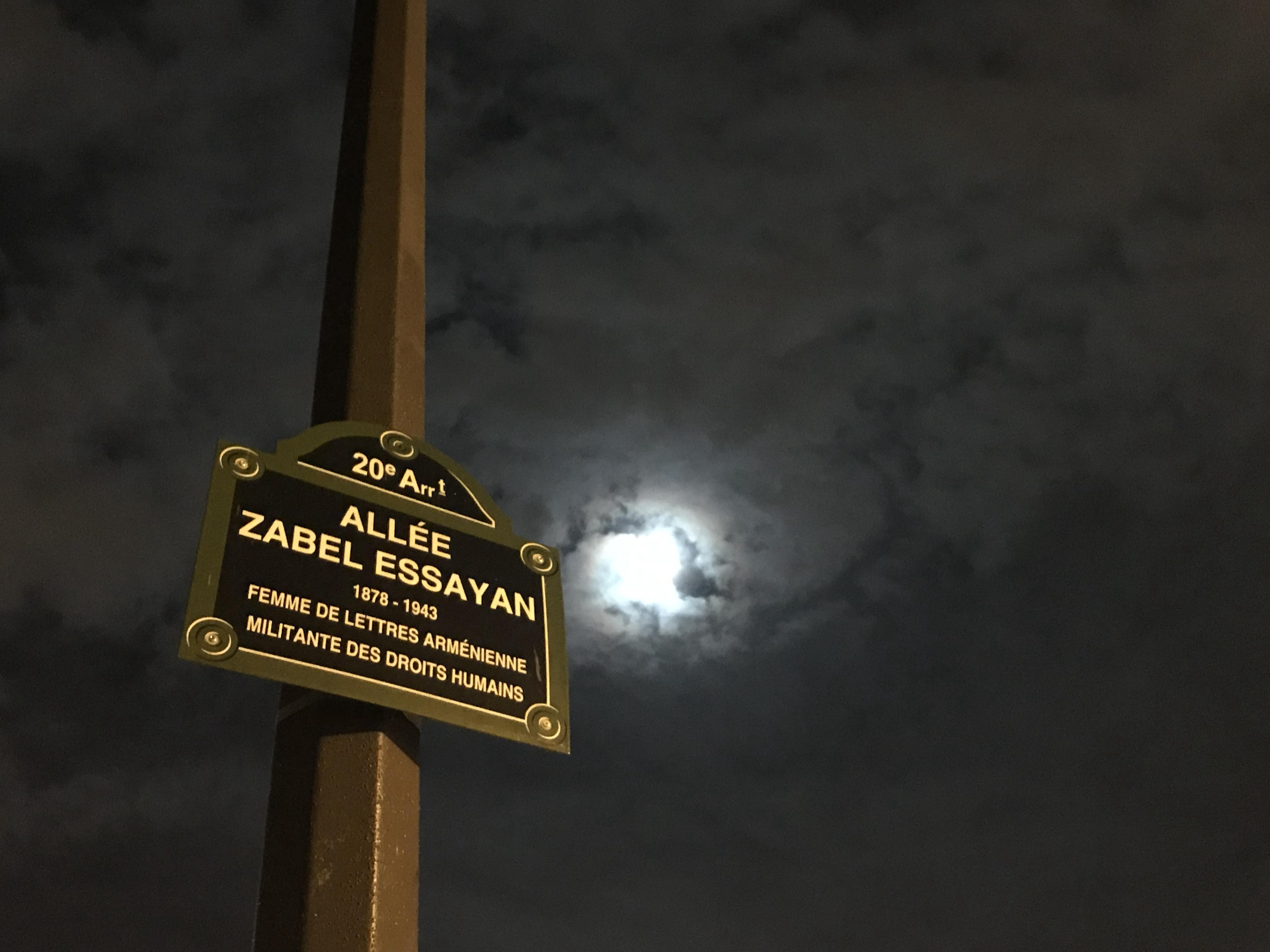
The Zabel Essayan Alleyway in Paris, France, inaugurated on 8 March 2018, on the occasion of International Women's Day.

Lara Aharonian, founder of the Women's Resource Center of Armenia, and Talin Suciyan, Yerevan correspondent for the Turkish Armenian newspaper Agos directed a documentary film about her titled Finding Zabel Yesayan. It was released in collaboration with Utopiana and premiered on March 7, 2009.

In her MA thesis titled Censorship, otherness and feminism: the silenced figure of Zabel Yesayan (2013), Vardush Hovsepyan Vardanyan aims to revive the figure of Yesayan, one of the Armenian writers and activists whose name had been forgotten.

A street in Paris was renamed after Yesayan on March 8, 2018, during International Women's Day.

In a 2019 interview, Turkish writer Elif Shafak described Zabel Yesayan's In the Ruins as her "favorite book no one else has heard of." Shafak described it as a "heart-rending cry, an important chronicle. A very important read."

In 2022 a life-size monument dedicated to Zabel Yesayan was unveiled in the village of Proshyan, Kotayk Province of the Republic of Armenia, in the area of Zapel Esayan Agribusiness Center. In same year, in Istanbul, an association on the Armenian literature named after her was founded, Yesayan Culture and Literature Association, in relation with Aras Publishing Company founded by Armenians in Turkey.

According to the Armenian International Women's Association (AIWA), several of Yesayan's works were published in the literary journal Pangaryus as part of AIWA's series Treasury of Armenian Women's Literature. The materials were selected from the three volumes of Yesayan's work translated into English. The works published included My Home, an excerpt from Yesayan's memoir titled The Gardens of Silihdar; Yesayan's eyewitness account of the Adana massacre of 1909, titled In the Ruins; and a mystery story called The Man, which had previously been published in a collection called My Soul in Exile and Other Writings. In 2023 Gomidas Institute published Zabel Yessayan's "On the Threshold. Key Texts on Armenians and Turks as Ottoman Subjects".

== List of works ==
- The Waiting Room (1903)
- The Obedients and the Rebels (1906)
- Phony Geniuses (1909)
- In the Ruins: The 1909 Massacres of Armenians in Adana, Turkey (1911)
- Enough! (1912-1913)
- Memories of a Writer (1915)
- The Agony of a People (1917)
- The Last Cup (1917)
- Murad's Journey from Sivas to Batum (1920)
- Le Role de la Femme Armenienne pendant la Guerre (The role of Armenian Women during the war) (1922)
- My Soul in Exile (1922)
- Retreating Forces (1923)
- Prometheus Unchained (1928)
- Meliha Nuri Hanim (1928)
- Shirt of Flame (1934)
- The Gardens of Silihdar (1935)
- Uncle Khachik (1936)

=== Memberships ===
- Member of the Union of Women who support Education
- Member of the Union of Nationalist Armenian Women
- President of Üsgüdari hay Dignants Ingerutyun (Üsküdar Women's Society)
- Member of the Alliance universelle des femmes pour la Paix par l'Education, France (International Women's Alliance for Peace Through Education), France
- Member of Soviet Writers Union, Armenia

== See also ==
- Armenian victims of the Great Purge

== Bibliography ==
- Baliozian, Ara, ed. (1982). The Gardens of Silihdar & Other Writings. Ashod Press. ISBN 978-0-935102-07-9.
- Rowe, Victoria (2000). The 'new Armenian woman': Armenian women's writing in the Ottoman Empire, 1880–1915 (Thesis). OCLC 1335714456. ProQuest 304657881.
- Rowe, Victoria (2008). "Armenian Writers and Women's-Rights Discourse in Turn-of-the-Twentieth-Century Constantinople". Aspasia. 2 (1). doi:10.3167/asp.2008.020104.
- Siegel, Mona L. (2020). Peace on Our Terms: The Global Battle for Women's Rights After the First World War. Columbia University Press. ISBN 978-0-231-55118-2. OCLC 1124788151.
