= Abraham Guloyan =

Soviet Armenian politician (1893–1938)

- Աբրահամ Գուլոյան

Chairmen of the Council of People's Commissars of Armenia
- In office February 1935 – September 1937
- Preceded by: Sahak Ter-Gabrielyan
- Succeeded by: Mushegh Danelyan

Personal details
- Born: Abraham Guloyan; 1893 Salmas, Qajar Iran
- Died: April 19, 1938 (aged 44–45) Soviet Union
- Party: CPSU
- Education: Gevorgian Seminary
- Occupation: politician

Abraham Guloyan (Armenian: Աբրահամ Գուլոյան) was a Soviet Armenian politician.

== Biography ==
Guloyan was born to an Armenian family in 1893 in Salmas in northwestern Iran. He studied at the Gevorgian Seminary at Etchmiadzin, then continued his studies at universities in Moscow and Petrograd. He was the rector of the Communist University of Transcaucasia, then the president of the State Planning Commission of Soviet Armenia, and then in 1935, Chairmen of the Council of People's Commissars of the Armenian SSR.

Guloyan's tenure in office coincided with the growing repression of party functionaries during the Great Purge in Soviet Armenia. Guloyan himself was arrested on September 14, 1937, by Georgy Malenkov in Yerevan, on the personal orders of Joseph Stalin. In his speech before the Armenian Party plenum on September 15, Malenkov "boasted of arresting Guloyan and extracting a quick confession from him after one hour." Guloyan was executed on April 19, 1938.
