= Aygehat =

Aygehat Այգեհատ
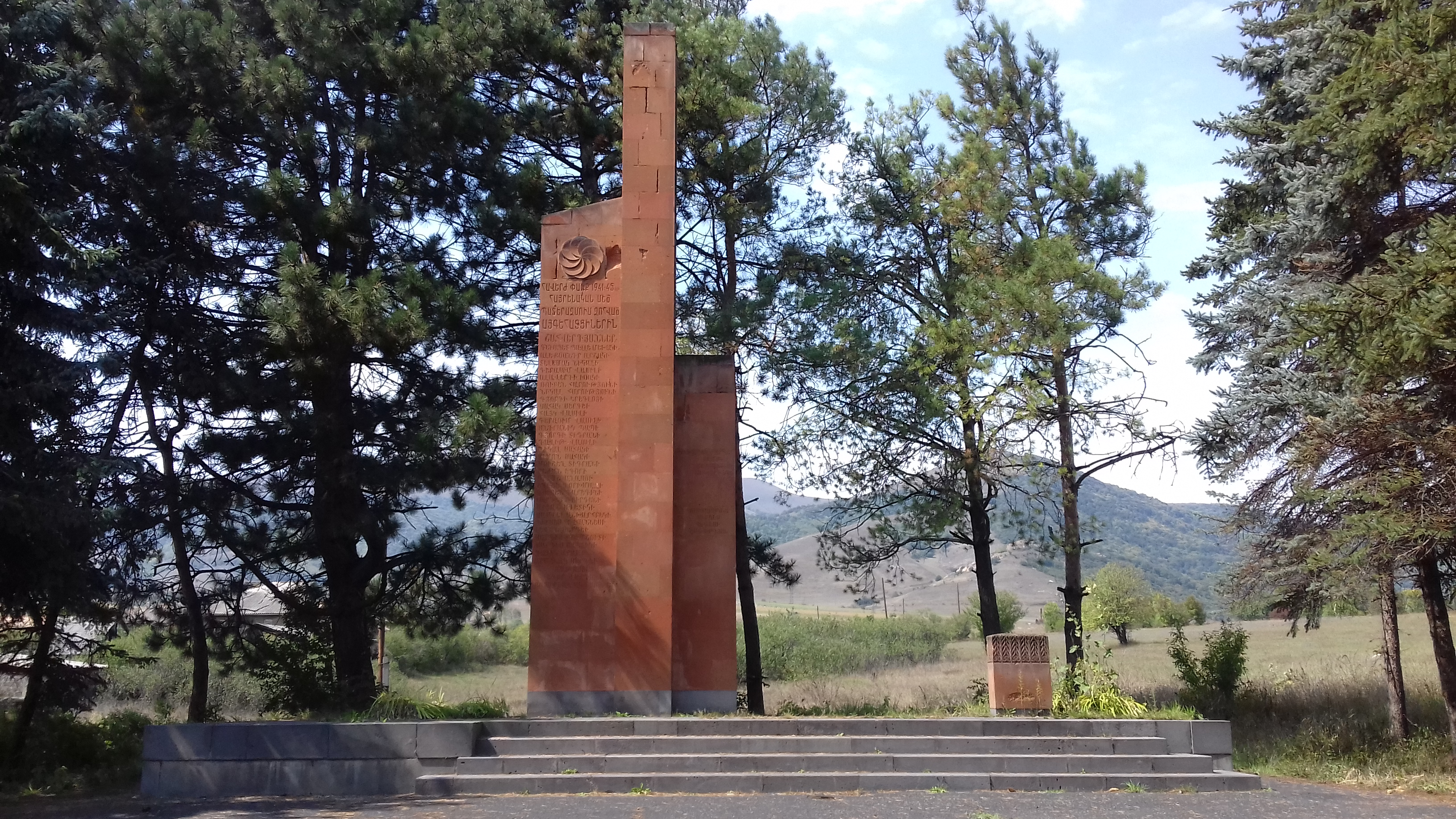

- Location within Armenia
- Coordinates: 41°00′58″N 44°35′43″E
- Country: Armenia
- Province: Lori

Area
  - Total: 0.58 km^{2} (0.22 sq mi)
- Elevation: 1,150 m (3,770 ft)

Population (2011)
  - Total: 263
  - Density: 450/km^{2} (1,200/sq mi)
- Time zone: UTC+4 (AMT)
- Postal code: 1717

Aygehat (Armenian: Այգեհատ) is a village in the Odzun Municipality of the Lori Province in Armenia.

== Toponymy ==
During the Khrushchev thaw, on February 2, 1963, the village was renamed Danushavan, in honor of Danush Shahverdyan, an Armenian Old Bolshevik and Soviet statesman who was born in Aygehat. A victim of Stalin's repressions, Shahverdyan had been posthumously rehabilitated on September 25, 1954. The name Aygehat was restored in 1992.

== Geography ==
The village is located 9 km (5.6 mi) south-west of the city of Alaverdi and 43 km (27 mi) northeast of the city of Vanadzor. The village is located on the left bank of the Debed river on a high plateau, 1.15 km above sea level.

== Economy and culture ==
In the enlarged Odzun community, which includes Aygehat as well as neighboring villages, agriculture and livestock remain the primary sources of income. Out of the registered residents in the community 3,408 are employed, mostly in cattle-breeding and agriculture, across some 9,323 hectares of agricultural land.

In July 2025, Aygehat was identified as one of nine rural communities in the Lori region to benefit from a new water reservoir project supported by the Serbian government and the United Nations Development Programme (UNDP). The reservoir, with a planned capacity of 8,900 m³, will include water supply and drainage systems and is expected to irrigate approximately 400 hectares of farmland. A delegation from Serbia, UNDP, and Armenia visited the construction site in Hovnanadzor to assess progress and emphasized the project’s importance for strengthening agricultural productivity and resilience in Aygehat and surrounding villages. The project will directly benefit 900 households and indirectly support over 8,000 individuals, including refugees.

== Gallery ==
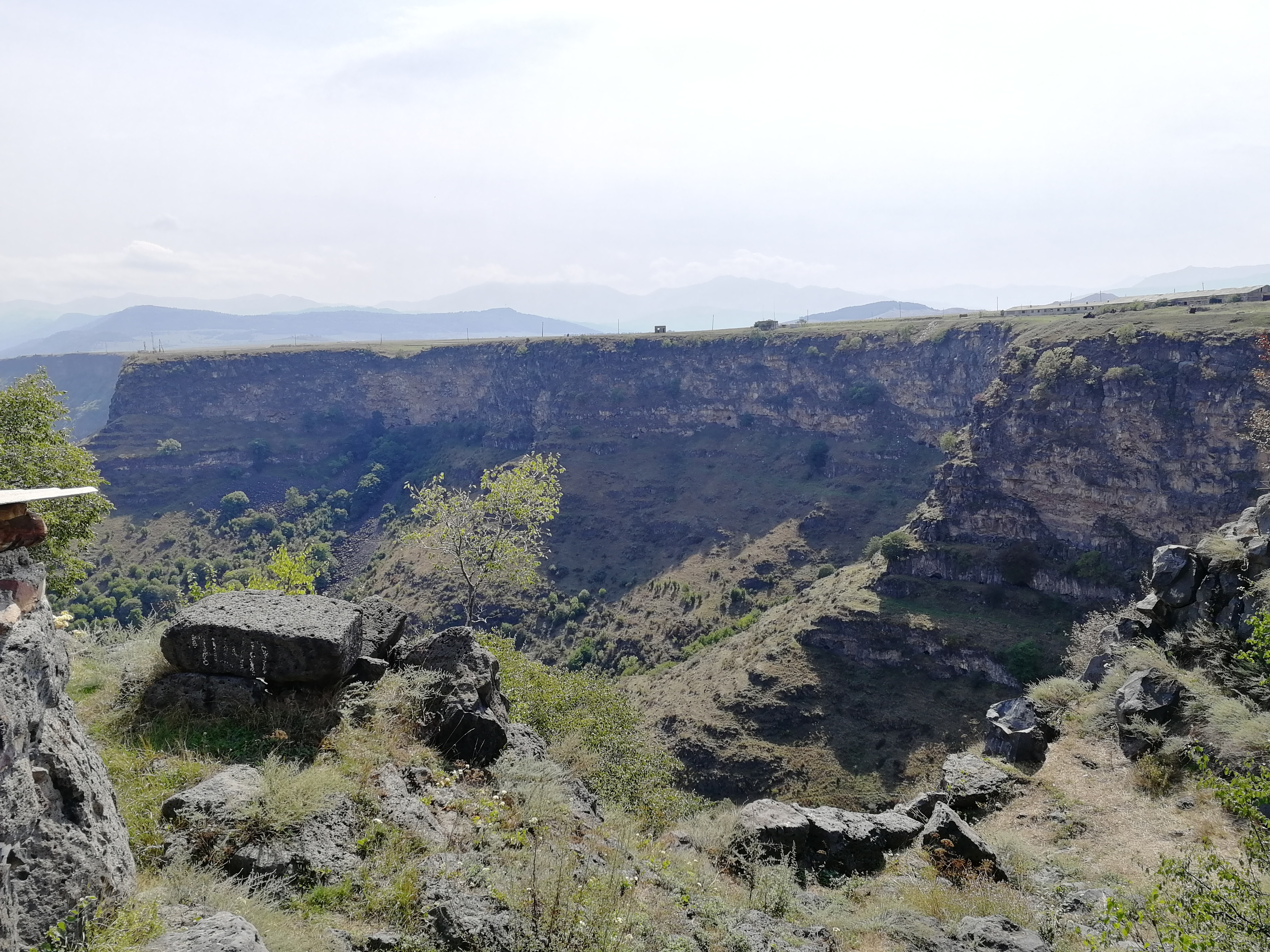

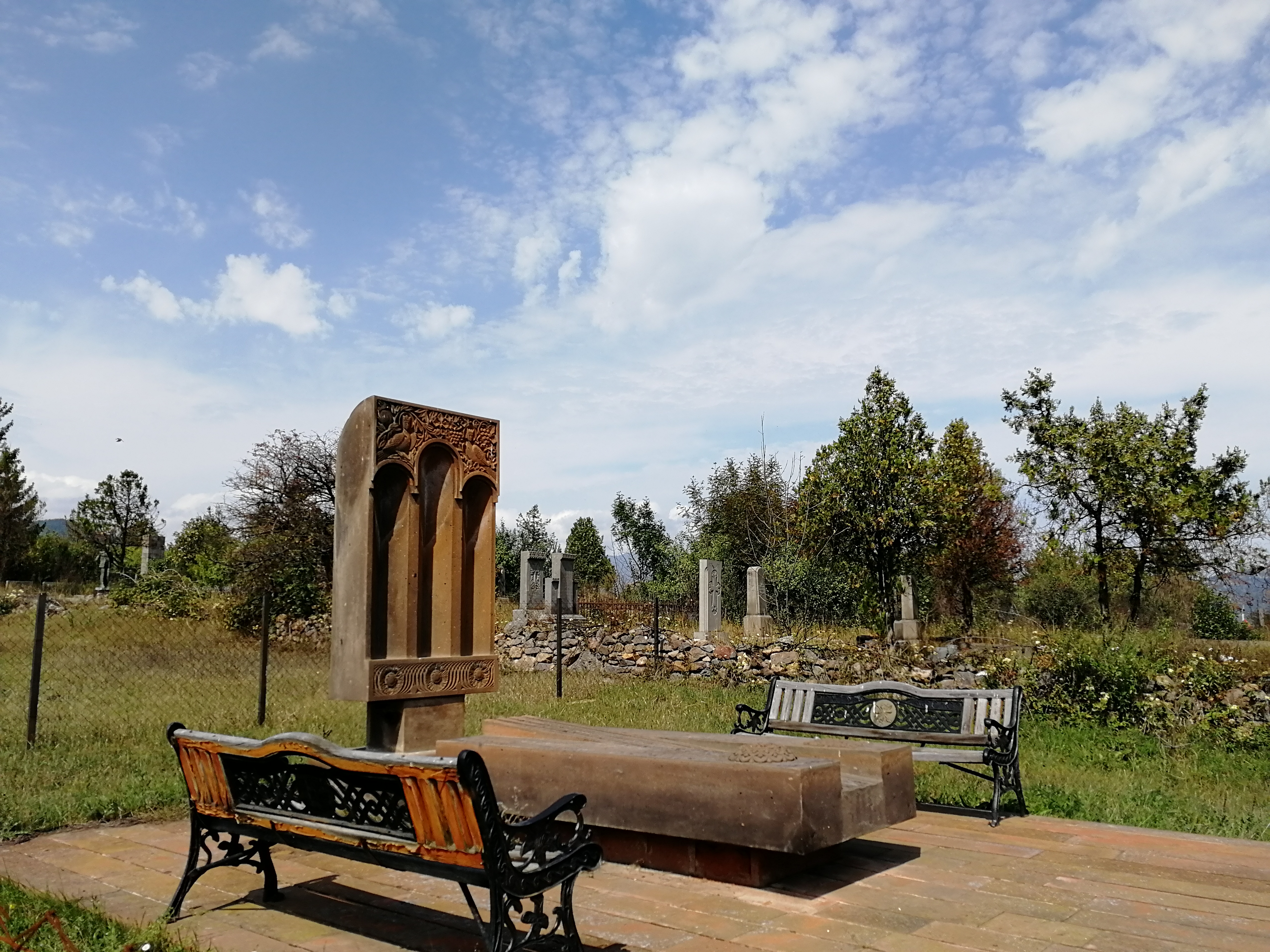

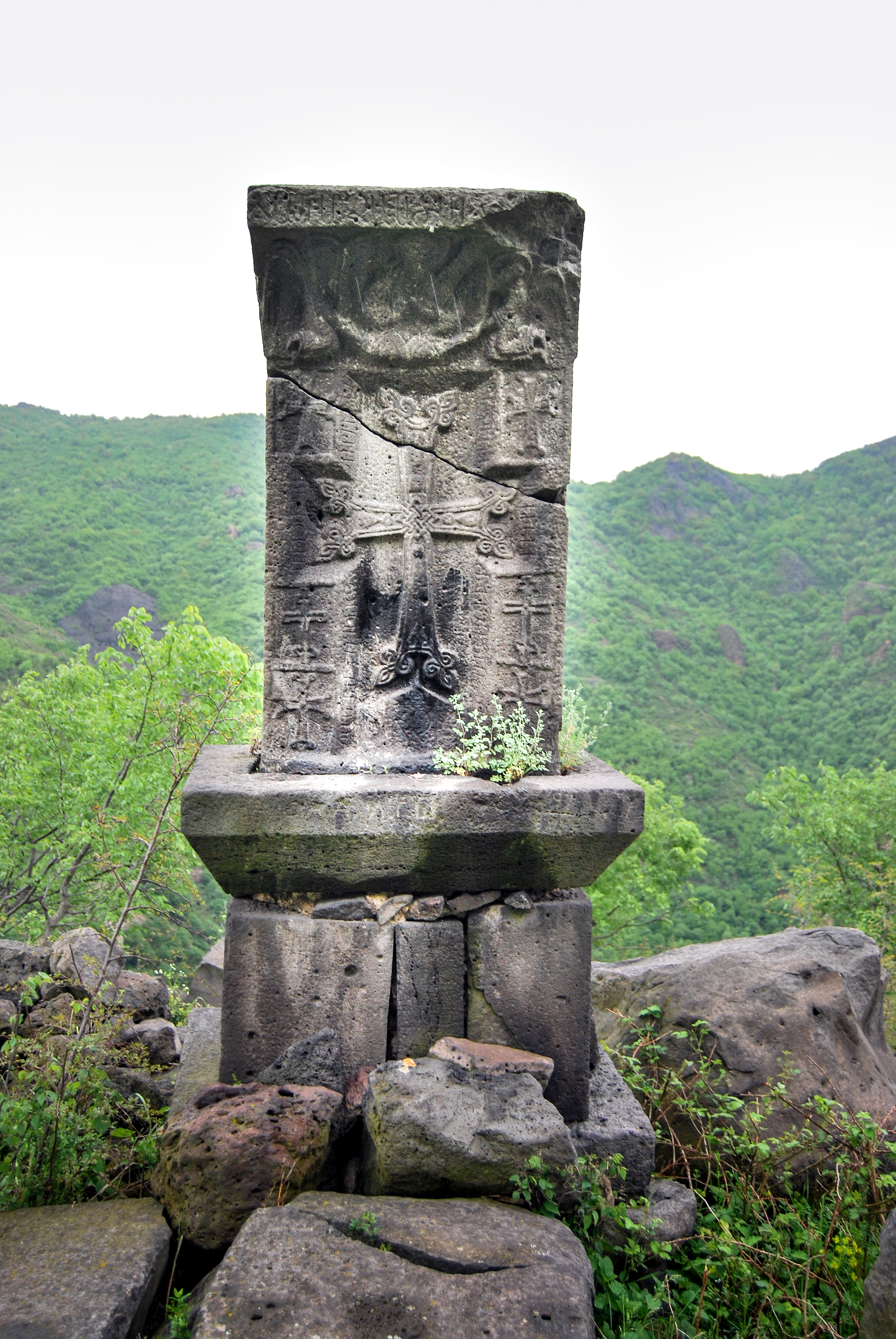

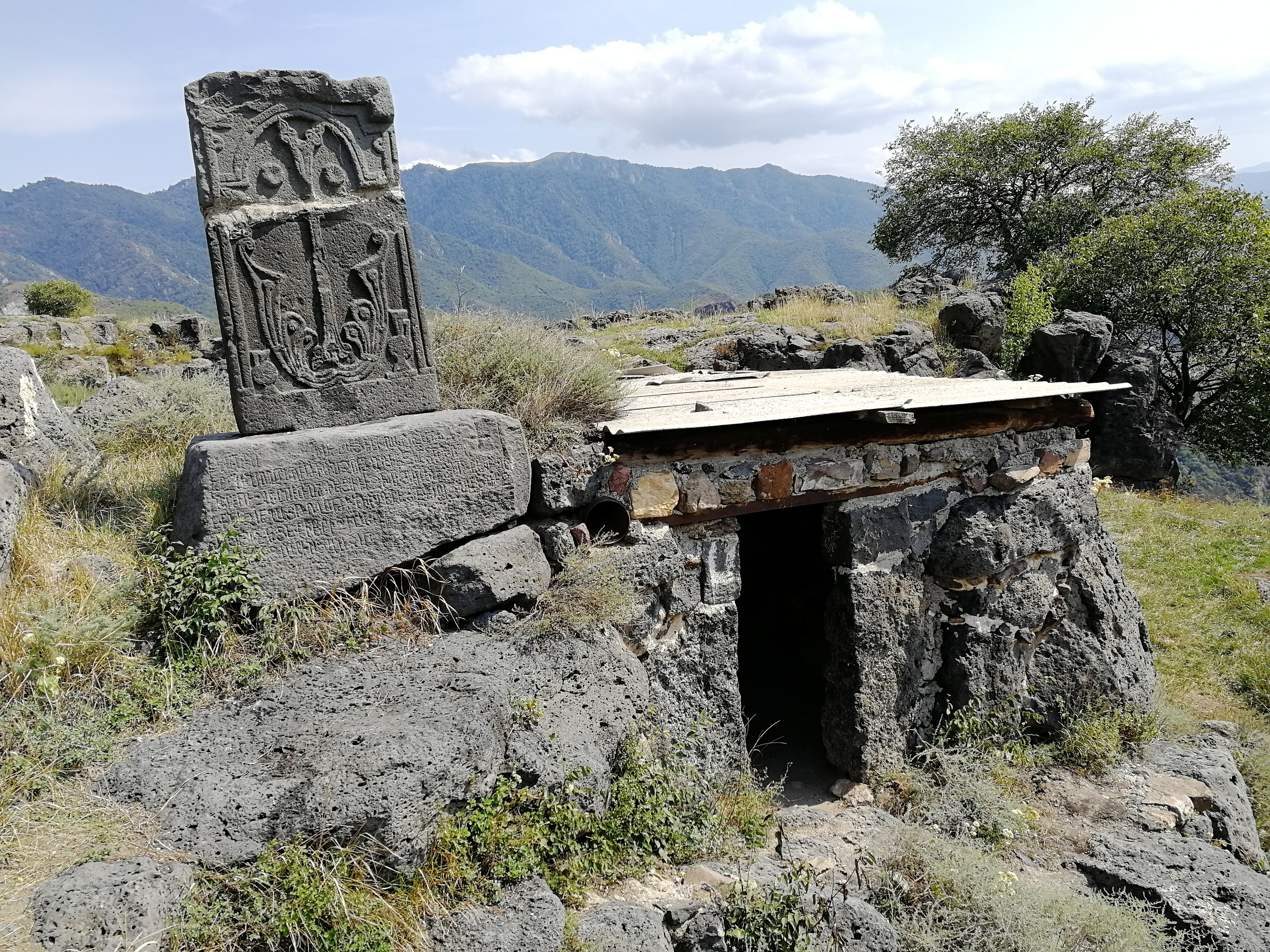

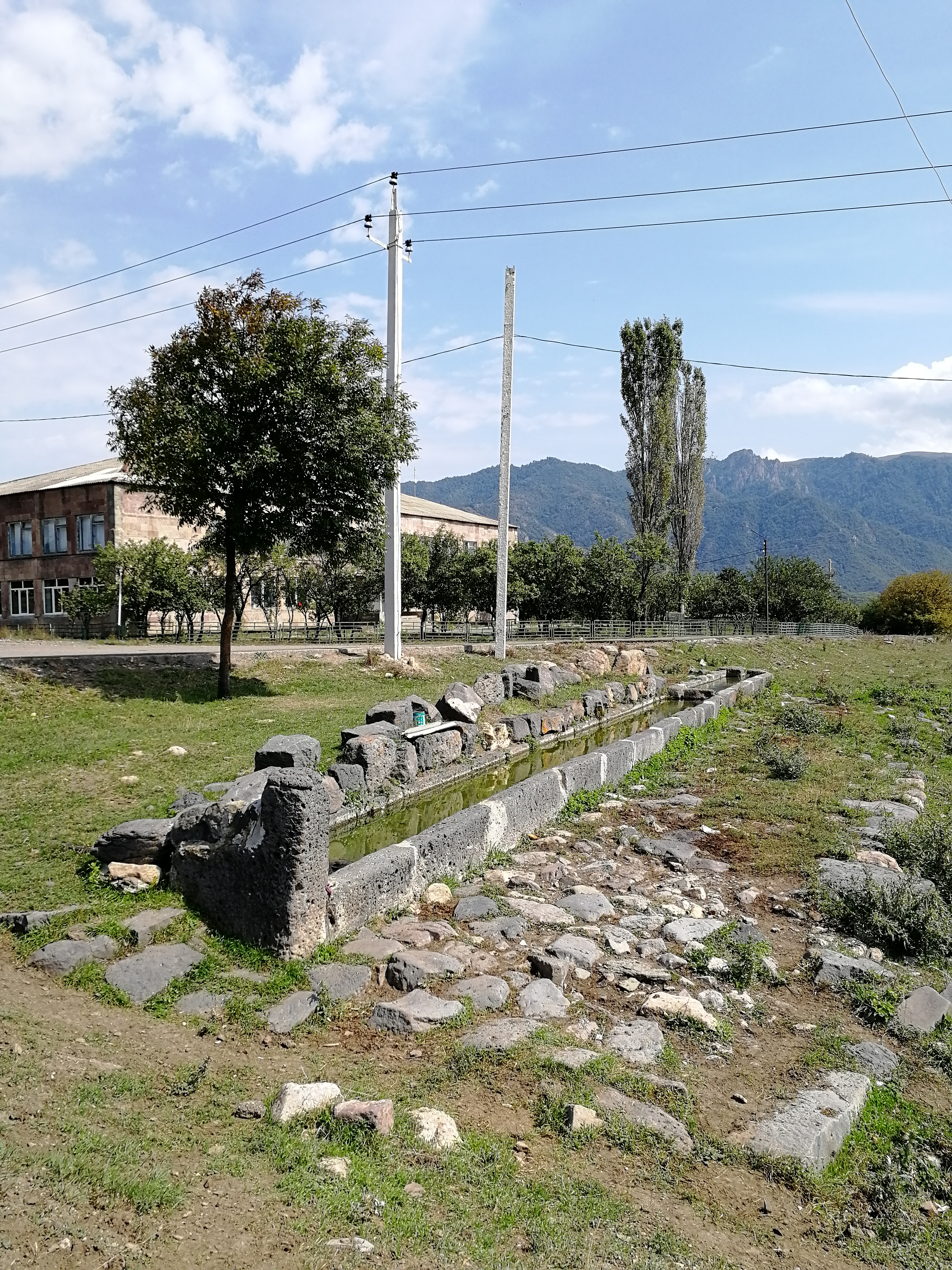

== Notable people ==
- Simon Zavarian
- Danush Shahverdyan
