= Statue of Zabel Yesayan (Proshyan) =

Statue in Proshyan, Armenia

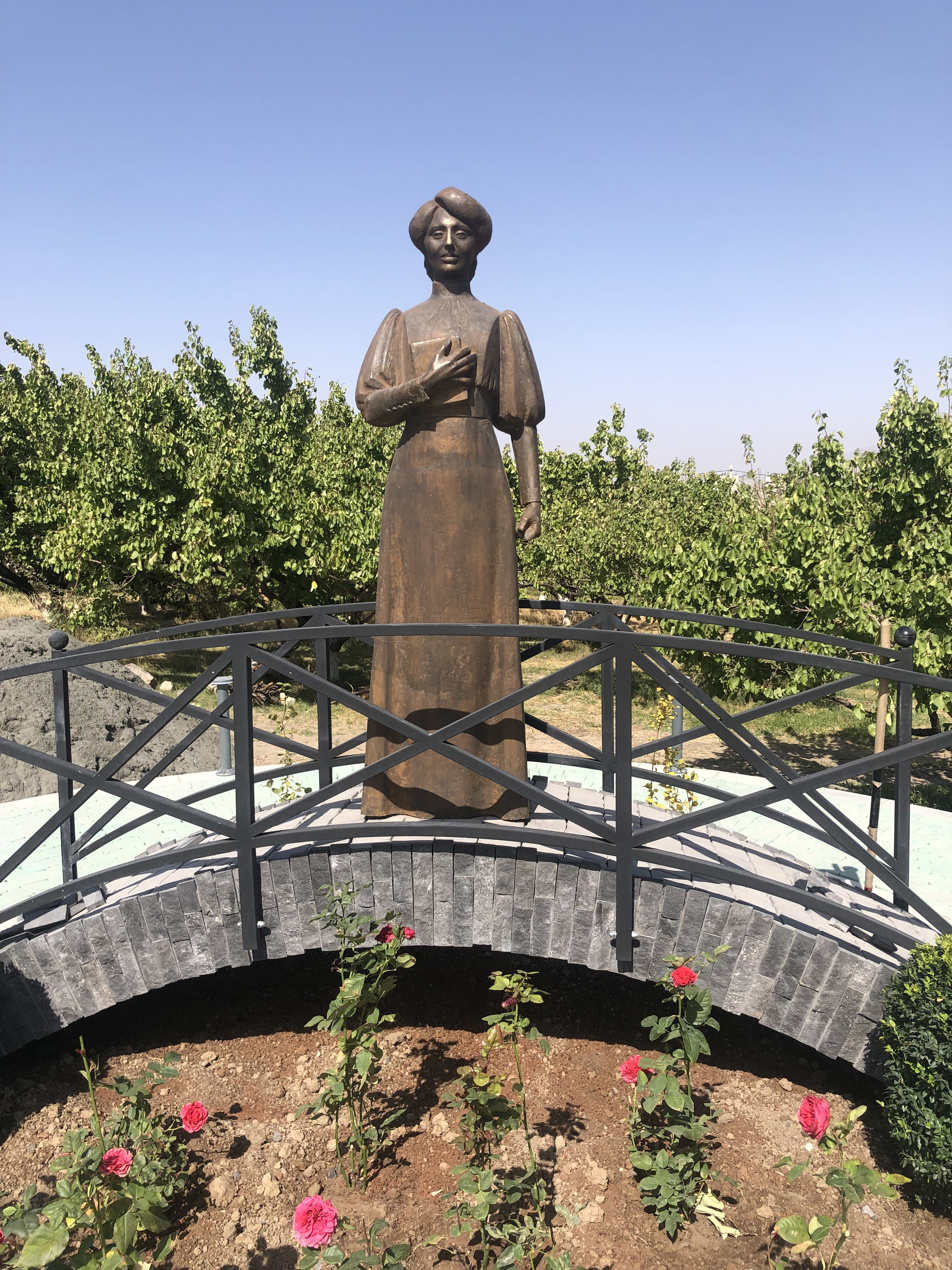
- The statue in 2022
- Artist: Nune Tumanyan
- Year: 2022
- Medium: Bronze sculpture
- Subject: Zabel Yesayan
- Dimensions: 1.80 m (5.91 ft)
- Location: Proshyan, Kotayk Province, Armenia; 40°15′13.4″N 44°25′22.8″E

Statue of Zabel Yesayan (Armenian: Զաբել Եսայանի հուշարձան), a life-size monument dedicated to famous Armenian writer, novelist, translator, public speaker, literary critic Zabel Yesayan. It is located in the village of Proshyan, Kotayk Province of Armenia, in the area of the International Center for Agribusiness Research and Education (ICARE): 5th street, 12th lane, 1.

The project was implemented by the Armenian Artists Project charitable online gallery, under the initiative and sponsorship of Diaspora Armenians Victor Zarougian and Judy Saryan.

== History ==
In 2021, Boston-Armenian philanthropists Victor Zarougian and Judy Saryan commissioned an original monument dedicated to Armenian novelist, public speaker and politician Zabel Yesayan.

The opening ceremony of the monument took place on October 9, 2022, in the park of the Zabel Yesayan Agribusiness Center. The opening speech was delivered by Judy Saryan, who presented important episodes of Yesayan's biography, emphasizing her great contribution to the protection of the rights of the Armenian people, especially Armenian women.

The Nairyan vocal ensemble performed at the opening ceremony, whose artistic director Naira Mugdusyan first presented Zabel Yesayan's letter to her daughter. Mughdusyan accompanied her speech with sign language.

== Description ==
The sculpture of Zabel Yesayan is placed on the bridge. She is holding a book in her right hand, which symbolizes her intellectual character and love for literature. The left hand is a fist, symbolizing Yesayan's fighting spirit and defiant character. The bridge-pedestal of the statue symbolizes Western and Eastern Armenia, on which the image of Yesayan stands as a connecting link.

The statue is made of bronze, and it is 1 meter 80 cm high. The height together with the bridge is 2 meters 50 cm.

== Authors ==
Sculptor: Nune Tumanyan

== Gallery ==
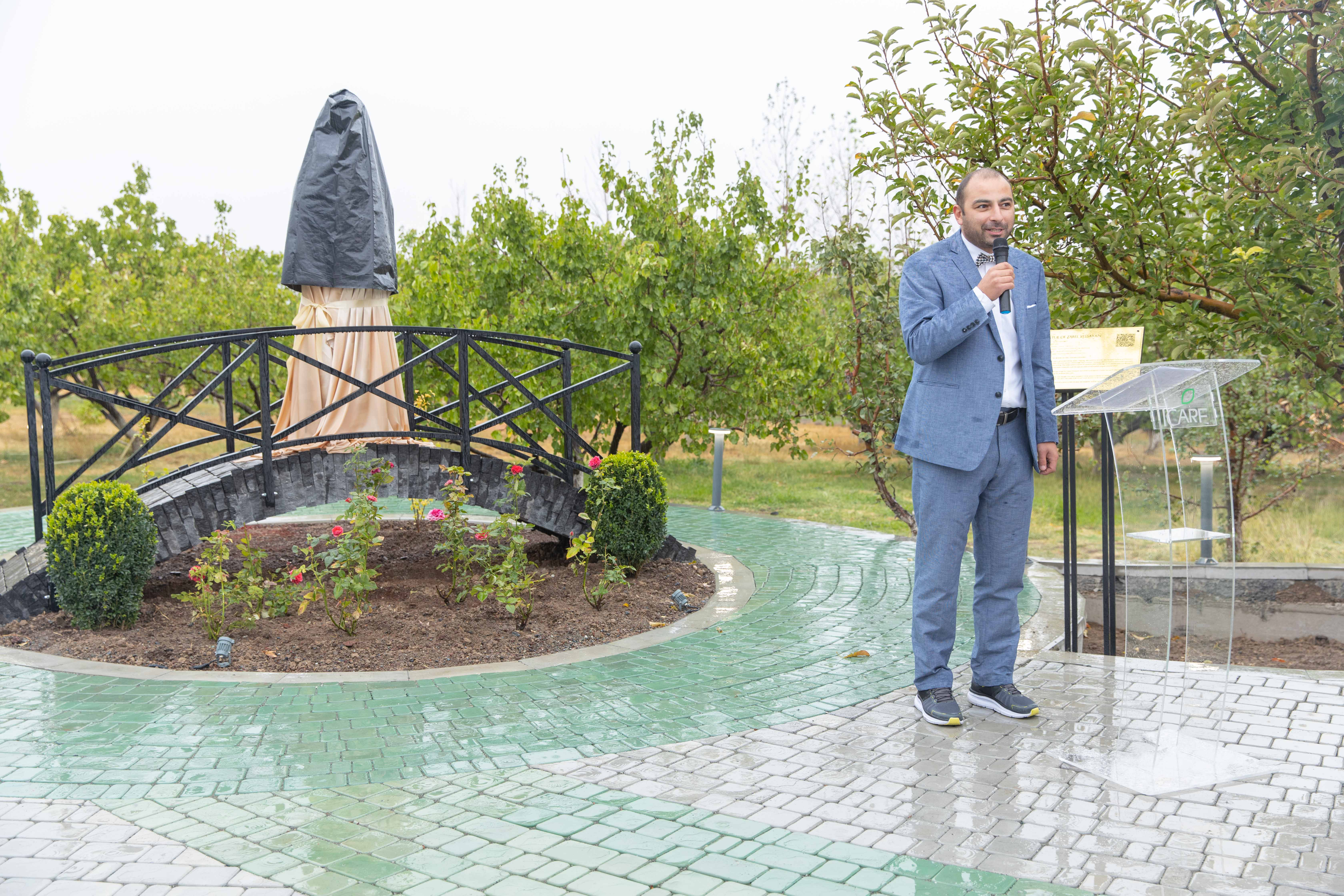
The opening ceremony of Zapel Yesayan's statue

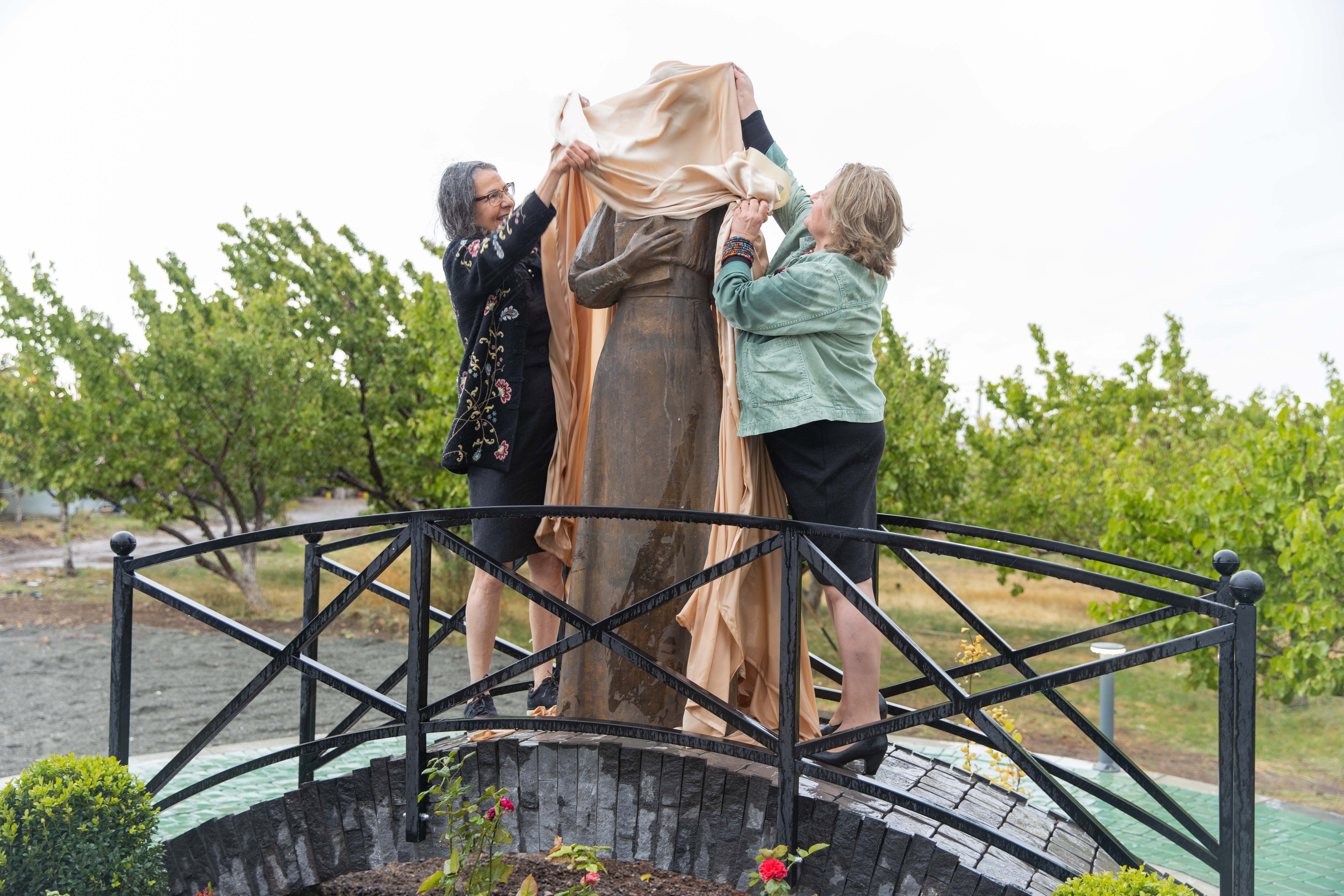
Sculptor Nune Tumanyan and philanthropist Judy Saryan unveil the statue

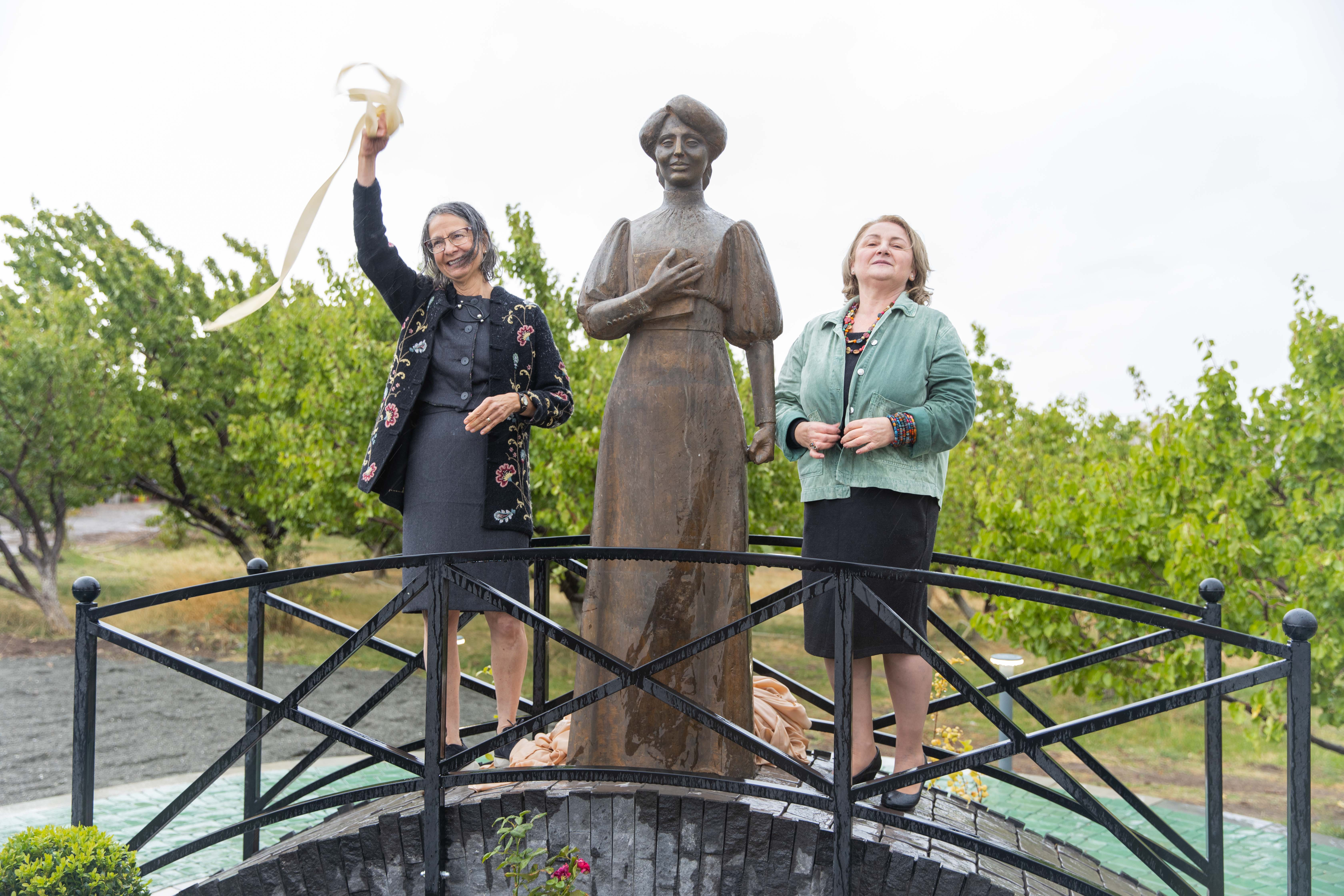
The opening ceremony of Zapel Yesayan's statue

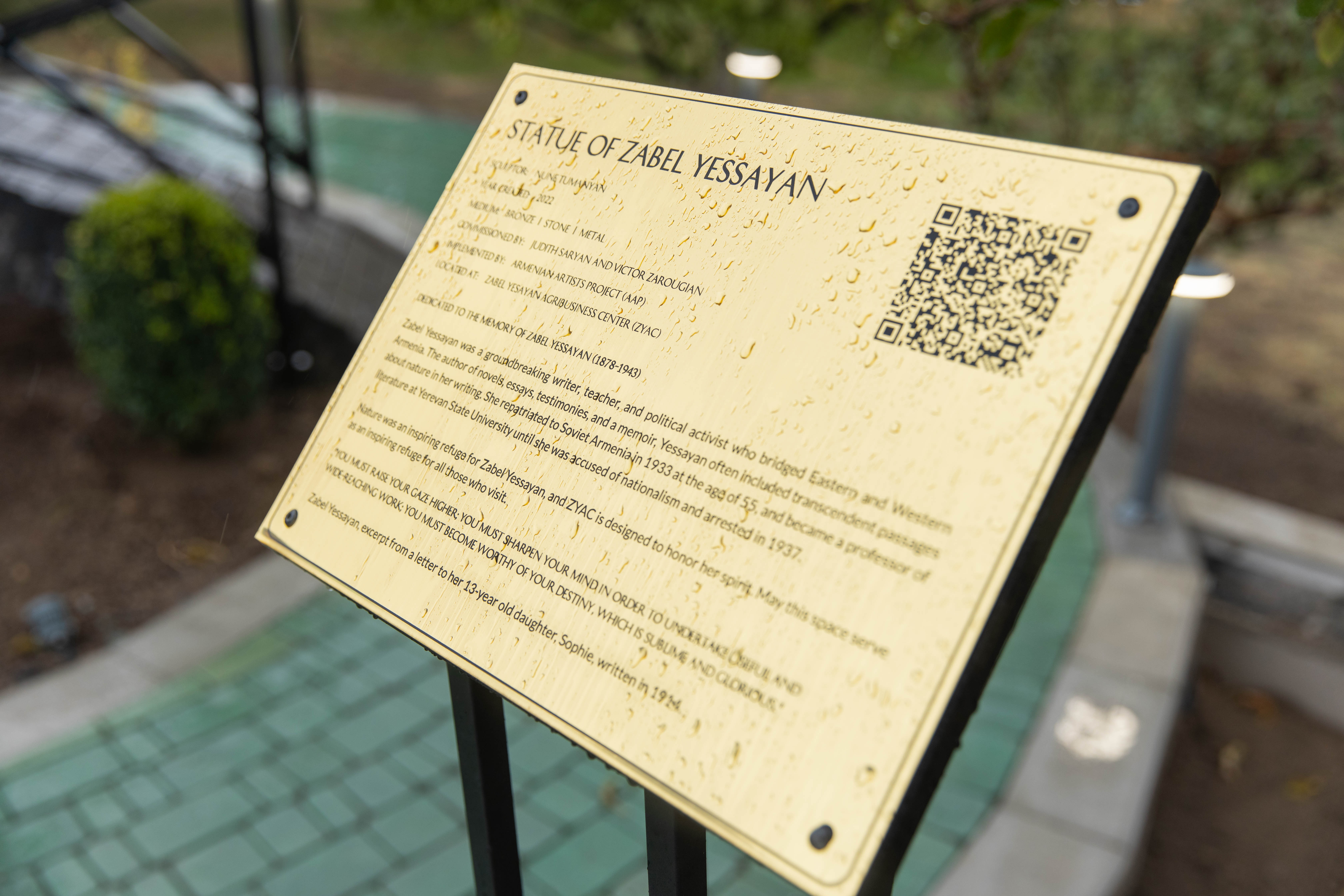
Information Plaque about the monument
