= KGB victim memorials =

Memorials to victims of the KGB have been set up in several countries that were formerly occupied by the Soviet Union, often in former KGB prisons, to document the repressions of the Soviet secret police and to commemorate its victims. Some are in the form of monuments at the location of KGB prisons or execution sites, others are museums and documentation centres.

== Armenia ==
In Yerevan, the large Cascade Memorial is dedicated to the victims of Soviet repressions in the 1930s and 1940s, with a large memorial slab in the center featuring an inscription by the poet Yeghishe Charents, who himself perished in a Soviet prison in 1937. Work on the memorial began in Soviet years, and was completed by 2008. While large and in a prominent location, research has documented that the Cascade Memorial is not widely known in Armenia.

== Estonia ==
The KGB Cells Museum in Tartu is situated in the "gray house", which in the 1940s and 1950s housed the South Estonian Centre of the NKVD/KGB. The basement floor with the cells for prisoners is open for visitors. Part of the cells, lock-ups and the corridor in the basement have been restored.

== Lithuania ==
The Museum of Genocide Victims was set up in Vilnius on 14 October 1992 in the former KGB headquarters (which had been used by the Gestapo during the Nazi occupation). The building also houses the Lithuanian Special Archive, where documents of the former KGB archive are kept.

== Latvia ==
"The Black Door", a memorial at the former KGB building on Stabu Street in Rīga, was unveiled in 2003. The memorial, designed by artist Glebs Pantelejevs, is a half-open steel door and a commemorative plaque.

== Germany ==
A memorial and exhibition centre (Gedenk‑ und Begegnungsstätte) was created in the former KGB prison in Potsdam. Initially used for interrogating alleged Western spies, some of whom were executed, the prison later mainly held Soviet soldiers who had been arrested for mutiny, desertion, or anti-Soviet activity.

== See also ==
- KGB
- Rehabilitation (Soviet)
- Human rights in the Soviet Union
- Soviet political system
- Soviet law
