= Aghasi Khanjian =

Soviet Armenian politician (1901–1936)

- Աղասի Խանջյան
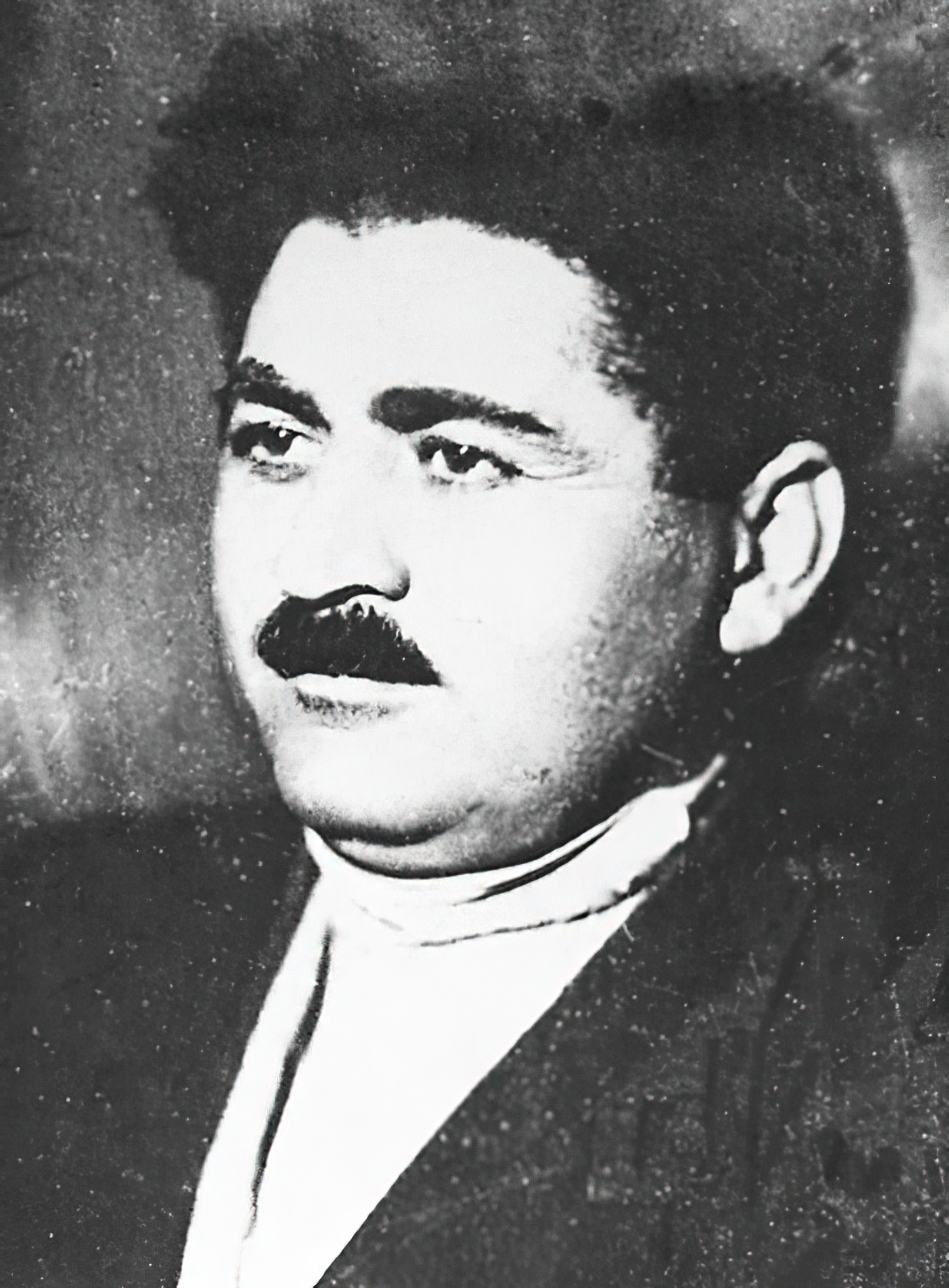
- Khanjian in 1934

First Secretary of the Communist Party of Armenia
- In office May 1930 – July 9, 1936
- Preceded by: Haykaz Kostanyan
- Succeeded by: Amatuni Amatuni

Personal details
- Born: January 30, 1901 Van, Van vilayet, Ottoman Empire
- Died: July 9, 1936 (aged 35) Tbilisi, Georgian SSR, Transcaucasian SFSR, Soviet Union
- Party: Russian Communist Party (Bolsheviks) (1919–1936)

Aghasi Ghevondi Khanjian (Armenian: Աղասի Ղևոնդի Խանջյան; Russian: Агаси Гевондович Ханджян, romanized: Agasi Gevondovich Khandzhyan; January 30, 1901 – July 9, 1936) was First Secretary of the Communist Party of Armenia from May 1930 to July 1936.

== Early life and career ==
Khanjian was born in the city of Van, Ottoman Empire (today eastern Turkey). With the onslaught of the Armenian genocide, his family emigrated from the city in 1915 and settled in Russian Armenia, where they took refuge at Etchmiadzin Cathedral. Khanjian enrolled at the Gevorgian Seminary, but gradually became attracted by revolutionary Marxist politics. In 1917–1919, he was one of the organizers of Spartak, the Marxist students' union of Armenia. He later served as the secretary of the Armenian Bolshevik underground committee. He was arrested by the Armenian authorities in August 1919. In September 1919, Khanjian was elected in absentia to the Transcaucasian regional committee of Komsomol. He was released from prison by January 1920, but was arrested again in August 1920 and sentenced to ten years of imprisonment. He was released after the establishment of Soviet rule in Armenia in December 1920 and was elected secretary of the Yerevan committee of the Armenian Communist Party, a position he held until February 1921.

Khanjian enrolled in Sverdlov Communist University in Moscow in 1921. After graduating, he worked as a party official in Leningrad, where he supported Joseph Stalin against the city's party boss, Grigory Zinoviev. He was also a close associate of Sergei Kirov. Khanjian returned to Armenia in April 1928 and served as a secretary of the Armenian Communist Party in 1928–29 and first secretary of the Yerevan City Committee of the Communist Party of Armenia in March 1929–May 1930. In May 1930, at the age of 29, he was appointed First Secretary of the Armenian Communist Party. Khanjian was opposed by the Armenian Old Bolsheviks who had governed Armenia since the early 1920s, but he was gradually able to sideline them. Khanjian's rival in the Armenian Communist Party was Sahak Ter-Gabrielyan, who was Chairman of the Council of People's Commissars of the Armenian SSR from 1928 to 1935.

Khanjian took over the leadership of the Armenian party at a time when the peasants were being forced to give up their land and were being driven onto collective farms, on instructions in Moscow. This provoked widespread resistance. The Soviet press revealed at the time that the communists lost control of parts of Armenia, which were in rebel hands for several weeks in March and April 1930. Under Khanjian, the process was completed without any reports of armed clashes between rebels and the security services. A more lenient collectivization policy was adopted in 1930, and many forcibly created collective farms were dissolved. Instead, the government imposed high taxes on private farms in order to push peasants to join collective farms. By 1932, around 40 percent of the Armenian republic's peasants had joined collective farms.

A popular leader among Armenians, Khanjian was politically "as much of a nationalist as a Communist could safely be at the time – and probably a little more so." He was a friend and supporter of many Armenian intellectuals, including Yeghishe Charents, Axel Bakunts, and Vahan Totovents (all three were subjected to political repressions after Khanjian's death). In a speech in January 1932, Khanjian condemned "Great Russian chauvinism" and defended the Armenian language, literature, and history. Two years later, in following with the shift in Stalinist policy toward condemning local nationalism, Khanjian fiercely criticized Armenian nationalism and alleged that it was still widespread among Armenian intellectuals. In a 1935 letter addressed to Stalin criticizing Khanjian, Armenian Bolshevik Aramais Erzinkyan cited Khanjian's support for the unification of Kars, Nagorno-Karabakh, and Nakhijevan with Soviet Armenia as evidence of the latter's "nationalism."

Khanjian paid particular attention to encouraging immigration to Soviet Armenia from the Armenian diaspora and to the republic's links with diasporic organizations. In October 1931, Khanjian gave a speech condemning Calouste Gulbenkian, the wealthy British-Armenian businessman and president of the Armenian General Benevolent Union, which contributed to Gulbenkian's resignation from the post in 1932.

== Conflict with Beria and death ==
Nestor Lakoba, Nikita Khrushchev, Lavrenti Beria and Aghasi Khanjian at the opening of the Moscow Metro in 1936, the same year Khanjian and Lakoba were killed by Beria. In 1953, Khrushchev had Beria executed.

In the mid-1930s, Khanjian came into conflict with Lavrentiy Beria, the leader of the Georgian SSR and the most powerful party leader in the Transcaucasian SFSR. Khanjian had poor relations with Beria and had openly opposed Stalin's decision to promote Beria to the post of second secretary of the Transcaucasian party regional committee in 1931 (Beria became first secretary the following year). Khanjian was targeted by Beria as a leader with his own power base and an obstacle to Beria's consolidation of power over the Transcaucasian republics.

Beria replaced many of Khanjian's allies in Armenia with his own in the lead-up to Khanjian's death. Beria was also motivated to replace Khanjian with one of his loyalists by the planned dissolution of the Transcaucasian SFSR in 1937, which would leave Beria with less power over the Transcaucasian republics besides Georgia. Khanjian's attempts to secure as much autonomy as possible for Armenia under the new Soviet constitution further antagonized Beria.

On May 21, 1936, the Armenian NKVD arrested Nersik Stepanyan [hy], a leading Armenian party intellectual and a vocal critic of Beria. On July 9, Beria called a meeting of the Transcaucasian party bureau in Tbilisi, where he and his allies accused Khanjian of protecting Stepanyan. Around 5:30 p.m., Khanjian went to his apartment in Tbilisi. He was found in his room by his bodyguards with a bullet wound to the head between 7:00 and 8:00 p.m. He was transported to a Tbilisi hospital and operated upon around 1:30 a.m., but was pronounced dead. His death date was recorded as July 9.

Political condemnations against Khanjian came soon after his death. On July 11, Zarya Vostoka declared that Khanjian had committed suicide, calling it "a manifestation of cowardice especially unworthy of a leader of a party organization." It was alleged that Khanjian had "committed errors, demonstrating insufficient vigilance" toward "nationalist, counterrevolutionary, and Trotskyite groups," and that he committed suicide because he "could not find the courage within himself to correct [his mistakes] in a Bolshevik manner." On August 19, 1936, Beria published an article in Pravda in which accused Khanjian of patronizing "rabid nationalist elements among the Armenian intelligentsia" and supporting the "counter-revolutionary terrorist group" of Stepanyan. He further accused Khanjian of corresponding with diasporan writer Arshag Chobanian about Armenian claims on Nagorno-Karabakh, Nakhijevan, and Javakheti. Khanjian was buried in Yerevan without public ceremony.

Soon after Khanjian's death, Beria promoted his loyalists Amatuni Amatuni as Armenian First Secretary and Khachik Mughdusi [hy] as chief of the Armenian NKVD. According to Amatuni in a June 1937 letter to Stalin, 1,365 people were arrested in the ten months after the death of Khanjian, among them 900 "Dashnak-Trotskiites." Along with an entire generation of Soviet Armenian intellectual leaders, Khanjian was denounced as an "enemy of the people" during Stalin's Great Purge. Charents viewed Khanjian's death "at the hands of Beria as an ominous sign of the violence to come." The poet subsequently wrote a series of seven sonnets in memory of Khanjian, titled Dofinë nairakan: yot’ sonet Aghasi Khanjyanin (The Dauphin of Nairi: Seven Sonnets to Aghasi Khanjian). Charents was eventually arrested on July 27, 1937 and died in prison on November 27.

== Rehabilitation ==
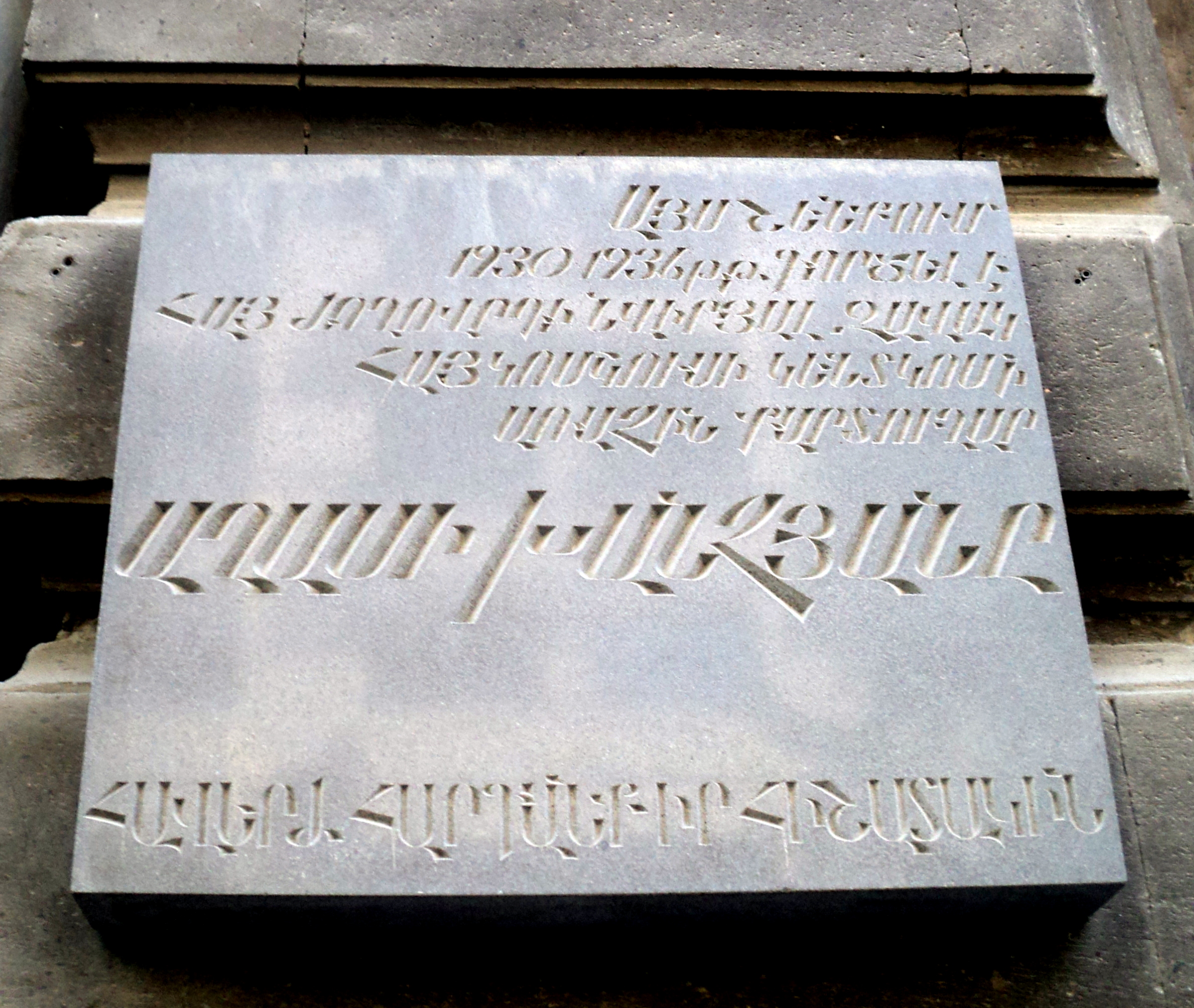
Khanjian's commemorative plaque in Yerevan

On March 11, 1954, in a speech in Yerevan, Anastas Mikoyan called for the rehabilitation of Charents, beginning the processes of the Khrushchev Thaw and de-Stalinization in Armenia. Shortly after the speech, Khanjian's mother appealed directly to Mikoyan, seeking the "reevaluation of her son's case and his rehabilitation." In response, Mikoyan "sent her request to the Chief Military Prosecutor's Office in August 1954."

On the recommendation of Roman Rudenko, Khanjian was officially rehabilitated posthumously by Soviet authorities on January 17, 1956. The official Soviet re-investigation into the Khanjian case concluded that same year that Beria had shot Khanjian dead in his office. In October 1961, KGB Chairman Alexander Shelepin publicly referred to that conclusion at the 22nd Congress of the Soviet Communist Party.

Stephen Kotkin has argued that it would have been unlikely for Beria to shoot Khanjian in his own office when members of the Moscow party Control Committee were in an adjacent room. However, during the 1950s re-investigation, A. A. Ivanova, an attendee of the Party Control Committee meeting from that day, testified that "she and her colleagues heard two gunshots emanating from Beria's office." Committee chairman Ivan Korotkov "rushed to the scene to investigate" and later informed Ivanova that "Beria had personally shot Khanjyan." Additionally, during the return trip to Moscow, Korotkov "drew a sketch from memory of Beria's office, with Khanjyan's dead body on the floor." Ivanova destroyed the sketch.

== See also ==
- Armenian victims of the Great Purge

== Bibliography ==
- Conquest, Robert (1988). The Harvest of Sorrow, Soviet Collectivisation and the Terror-Famine. London: Arrow. ISBN 0-09-956960-4.
- Geghamyan, G․ M․ (2012). "Խորհրդային Հայաստանը 1920–1945 թվականներին" [Soviet Armenia 1920–1945]. In Simonyan, H․ Ṙ․ (ed.). Հայոց պատմություն․ Հնագույն ժամանակներից մինչև մեր օրերը (PDF) (in Armenian). Yerevan: Yerevan State University Publishing House. ISBN 978-5-8084-1639-0. Archived from the original (PDF) on 2 June 2021.
- Knight, Amy (1993). Beria: Stalin's First Lieutenant. Princeton University Press. ISBN 0-691-03257-2.
- Kotkin, Stephen (2017). Stalin: Waiting for Hitler, 1929–1941. New York: Penguin Press. ISBN 9780735224483.
- Matossian, Mary Kilbourne (1975). "Armenia and the Armenians". In Katz, Zev; Rogers, Rosemarie; Harned, Frederic (eds.). Handbook of Major Soviet Nationalities. New York: Free Press. ISBN 9780029170908.
- Matossian, Mary Kilbourne (1962). The Impact of Soviet Policies in Armenia. Leiden: E.J. Brill.
- Medvedev, Roy Aleksandrovich (1989). Let History Judge: The Origins and Consequences of Stalinism. Translated by Shriver, George. New York: Columbia University Press. ISBN 9780231063500.
- Mnatsakanyan, Aramayis (1979). "Խանջյան, Աղասի Ղևոնդի". In Hambardzumyan, Viktor (ed.). Soviet Armenian Encyclopedia (in Armenian). Vol. 5. Yerevan: Armenian Academy of Sciences.
- Shakarian, Pietro A. (2025). Anastas Mikoyan: An Armenian Reformer in Khrushchev's Kremlin. Bloomington: Indiana University Press. ISBN 978-0253073556.
- Suny, Ronald Grigor (1993). Looking Toward Ararat: Armenia in Modern History. Indiana University Press. ISBN 978-0253207739.
- Tachjian, Vahé (2020). "Humanitarian diaspora? The AGBU in Soviet Armenia, 1920–1930s". In Piana, Francesca; Laycock, Joanne (eds.). Aid to Armenia: Humanitarianism and Intervention from the 1890s to the Present. Manchester University Press. ISBN 9781526142221.
