= Danush Shahverdyan =

Armenian Old Bolshevik and Soviet statesman (1882–1941)

- Դանուշ Շահվեդյան
- Born: Daniel Aleksandri Shahverdyan; 11 (23) January 1882; Aygehat, Borchaly uezd, Tiflis Governorate, Russian Empire (now Aygehat, Armenia)
- Died: October 24, 1941 (aged 59); Armenian SSR, Soviet Union
- Citizenship: Russian Empire; Soviet Union
- Occupations: revolutionary; statesman; political prisoner
- Political party: CPSU

Daniel (Danush) Aleksandri Shahverdyan (Armenian: Դանիել (Դանուշ) Ալեքսանդրի Շահվեդյան; Russian: Даниэл (Дануш) Александрович Шавердян; January 11 (23), 1882 – October 24, 1941) was an Armenian Old Bolshevik and Soviet statesman. A participant in the revolutionary movement in Transcaucasia, he was one of the organizers of the Communist Party of Armenia.

== Biography ==
Shahverdyan was born to a noble family, in the village of Aygehat in the historic Lori region of Armenia. He received his secondary education in Tiflis and graduated from the law faculty of the Saint Petersburg Imperial University in 1911. In 1902, he joined the Russian Social Democratic Labour Party and subsequently became a participant in the establishment of the Union of Armenian Social Democrats. In 1903, he was involved in the First all-Caucasus Congress of the RSDLP. Beginning in 1904, Shahverdyan conducted party work in Saint Petersburg and Tiflis. It was he who introduced Anastas Mikoyan to the works of Vladimir Lenin. During World War I, Shahverdyan carried out propaganda work among soldiers on the Caucasian Front.

In March 1917, Shahverdyan became a member of the executive committee of the Tiflis Soviet. In October, he became a member of the Caucasian Regional Committee of the Bolshevik faction of the RSDLP. During the civil war period, he was involved in underground work in the Democratic Republic of Georgia and the First Republic of Armenia. He organized a peasant rebellion in Dusheti, and was a member of the Armenkom, the Armenian Committee of the Bolshevik Party.

After the Sovietization of Transcaucasia, Shahverdyan worked as a trade representative of Soviet Armenia and the Transcaucasian SFSR in Turkey. During the NEP period, he also served as the People's Commissar of Justice of the Armenian SSR and the deputy chairman of the republic's Sovnarkom. He was best known for his efforts to repatriate Armenians from the Armenian diaspora to Soviet Armenia. In 1925, Shahverdyan was a delegate at the 14th Congress of the All-Union Communist Party (Bolsheviks). In 1928–1929, he was a representative of the Soviet Red Cross in the United Kingdom, Germany, and Belgium and in 1929, he worked in the People's Commissariat of Foreign Trade.

On February 23, 1937, Shahverdyan was arrested by the Armenian NKVD during Joseph Stalin's Great Purge. His wife Elizaveta was arrested one month later, on March 26. Although he was accused of "'Trotskiite-nationalist' espionage," the real reason for Shahverdyan's arrest was "his refusal to endorse Beria's falsifications on the history of the Bolsheviks in Transcaucasia." While in NKVD custody, Shahverdyan told the Armenian Bolshevik Ado Adoyan [hy] (another victim of the Purges) "do not forget that my sole 'crime' was my refusal to write memoirs to Beria's taste." During the repressions, Mikoyan attempted to save Shahverdyan, but to no avail. Shahverdyan died in prison on October 24, 1941.

== Rehabilitation and legacy ==
On March 11, 1954, in a speech in Yerevan, Mikoyan called for the rehabilitation of the poet Yeghishe Charents, beginning the processes of the Khrushchev Thaw and de-Stalinization in Armenia. Shortly after the speech, on April 20, 1954, Shahverdyan's son, Sergei, appealed to Mikoyan for the rehabilitation of his parents. In response, Mikoyan "forwarded his request to Soviet Prosecutor General Roman Rudenko that same day" and became personally involved in the subsequent re-investigation.

Danush and Elizaveta Shahverdyan were posthumously rehabilitated on September 25, 1954. From 1963 to 1992, Aygehat was renamed Danushavan, in honor of Shahverdyan. In 2012, the 130th anniversary of the birth of Shahverdyan was marked in Yerevan and Aygehat.

== See also ==
- Armenian victims of the Great Purge

== Bibliography ==
- Hovhannisyan, M. (1982). "Շահվեդյան, Դանիել (Դանուշ) Ալեքսանդրի". In Hambardzumyan, Viktor (ed.). Soviet Armenian Encyclopedia (in Armenian). Vol. 8. Yerevan: Armenian Academy of Sciences.
- Shakarian, Pietro A. (2025). Anastas Mikoyan: An Armenian Reformer in Khrushchev's Kremlin. Bloomington: Indiana University Press. ISBN 978-0253073556.
- Zhukov, Evgeny Mikhailovich, ed. (1976). "Шавердян, Шавердов, Даниэл (Дануш) Александрович". Soviet Historical Encyclopedia (in Russian). Vol. 16. Moscow: Sovetskaya Entsiklopediya.
