= Vahram Alazan =

Armenian poet, writer, and activist (1903–1966)

Vahram Alazan Վահրամ Ալազան
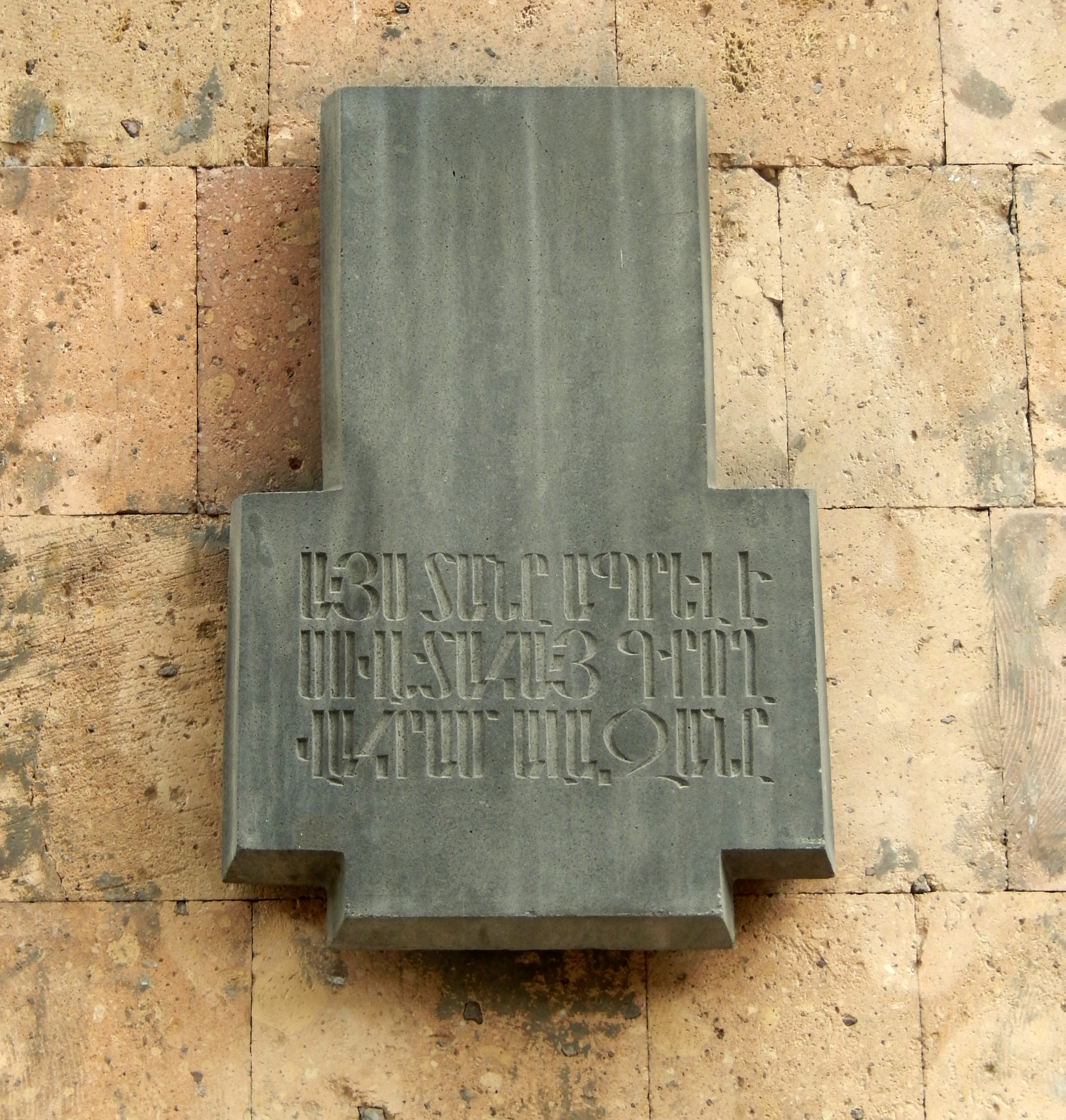
- Vahram Alazan's plaque in Yerevan
- Born: Vahram Gabuzyan; 19 May 1903; Van, Van vilayet, Ottoman Empire
- Died: 17 May 1966 (aged 62); Yerevan, Armenian SSR, Soviet Union
- Occupation: Writer
- Spouse: Maro Alazan
- Writing career
- Language: Armenian

Vahram Alazan (Armenian: Վահրամ Ալազան), born Vahram Gabuzyan (Armenian: Վահրամ Մարտիրոսի Գաբուզյան) (19 May (6 May O.S.) 1903 in Van – 17 May 1966 in Yerevan), was an Armenian poet, writer, and public activist, who served as the First Secretary of the Writers Union of Armenia from 1933 to 1936.

== Biography ==
A survivor of Armenian genocide, Alazan fled to Yerevan in 1915. After the Sovietization of Armenia, he became the head of the Proletarian Writer's Association of the Armenian SSR in 1923. His works, such as the poetic anthology Songs of Construction and Victory and the novel On the Sixtieth Horizon, became widely popular among Armenian readers. During Joseph Stalin's Great Purge, Alazan was arrested and exiled to Siberia, a place that "looms large in some of his verse and prose." After Stalin's death in 1953, he was rehabilitated during the Khrushchev Thaw on July 21, 1954.

== Selected works ==
- The Games of Summer (1923), poems
- Poet's Heart (1954), poems
- Northern Star (1956), novel
- Horizons (1957), poems
- Memoirs (1960)

== See also ==
- Armenian literature
- Armenian victims of the Great Purge
