= Cascade Memorial to the Victims of Soviet Repression =

Coordinates: 40°11′42.17″N 44°30′55.09″E

Cascade Memorial
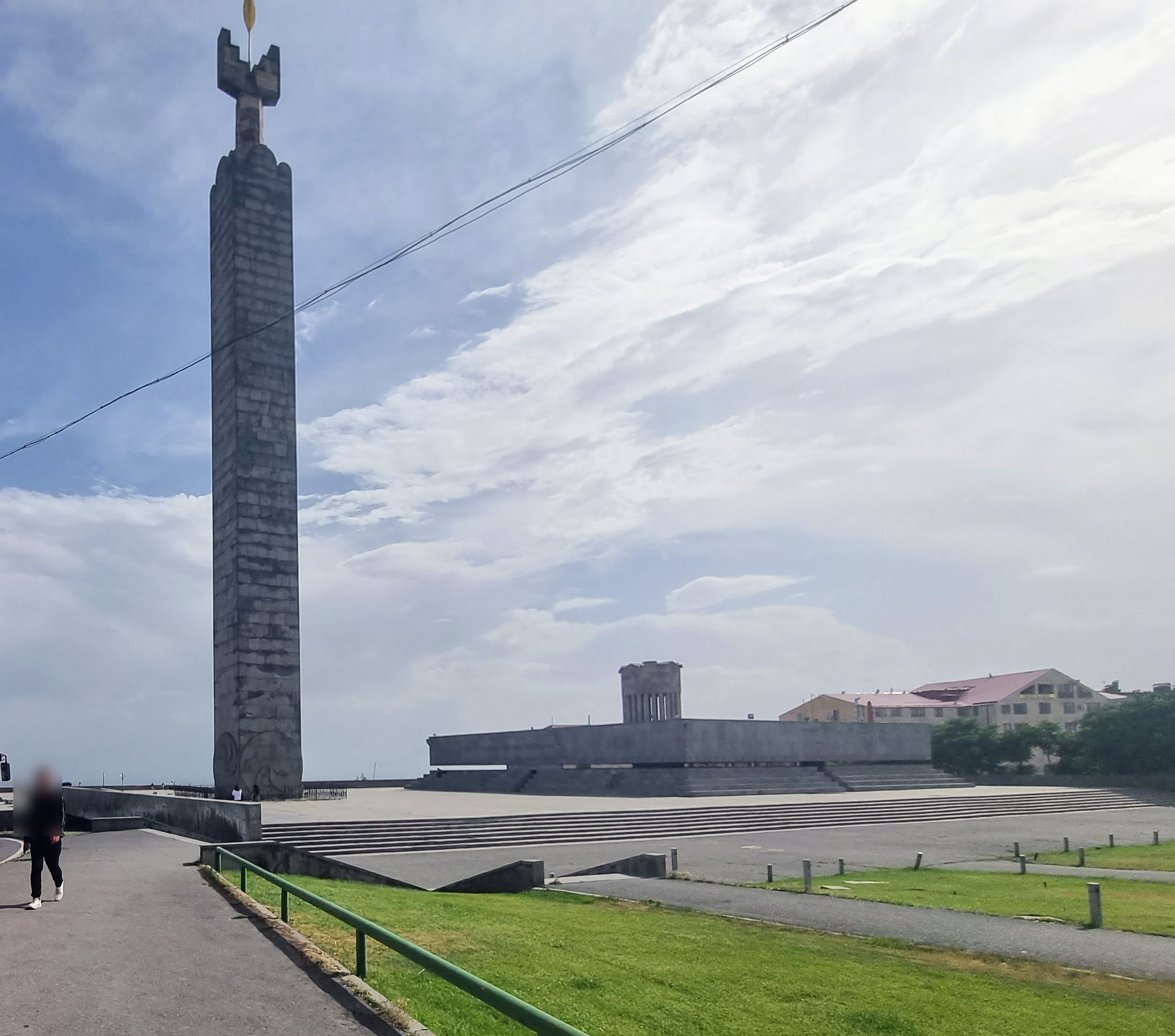
- Cascade Memorial

- Location within Armenia
- Location: Cascade Complex, Yerevan, Armenia

History
- Built: 1980s

Site notes
- Length: 29 m (95 ft)
- Architect: Jim Torosyan

The Cascade Memorial to the Victims of Soviet Repression, or "Cascade Memorial", for short, is a monument in Yerevan, Armenia, dedicated to the memory of the victims of Soviet-era murders and deportations. It sits atop the Yerevan Cascade, next to an obelisk that commemorates 50 years of Soviet Armenia. According to current research, the Cascade Memorial was designed by Jim Torosyan, Yerevan's chief architect between 1971 and 1981, and was constructed in the late 1980s and completed around 2008.

Inside the large concrete structure, a memorial slab has the inscription of "To All Your Souls on Fire", from the "Frenzied Masses" poem by Yeghishe Charents who himself fell victim to the repressions in 1937. Jim Torosyan's father, Petik Torosyan, also was arrested and executed in the 1930s. In the 1930s and 1940s, thousands of Armenians were deported and executed.

As of 2023, the formal status of the Cascade Memorial remains unclear, with no institutions claiming responsibility or ownership. Currently, a group of activists are the main caretakers. The Cascade Memorial has a small memorial ceremony taking place on June 14, the formal day of remembrance for the victims of Soviet repression. Though it has been closed to visitors for years, it has recently reopened (confirmed on July 21, 2024), and is worth a visit. There have been suggestions to create access systems that require visitors to read a name of a victim, to participate in commemoration.

Until August 2023, the Cascade Memorial lacked descriptions on Google Maps and other tourist guides. Research indicated that the monument, in spite of its size and prominent location, was barely known to residents of Yerevan. The monument was opened in 2008 by the then-President of Armenia Serzh Sargsyan, but has received few official visits since then.

== See also ==
- Armenian victims of the Great Purge
