= Armenian victims of the Great Purge =

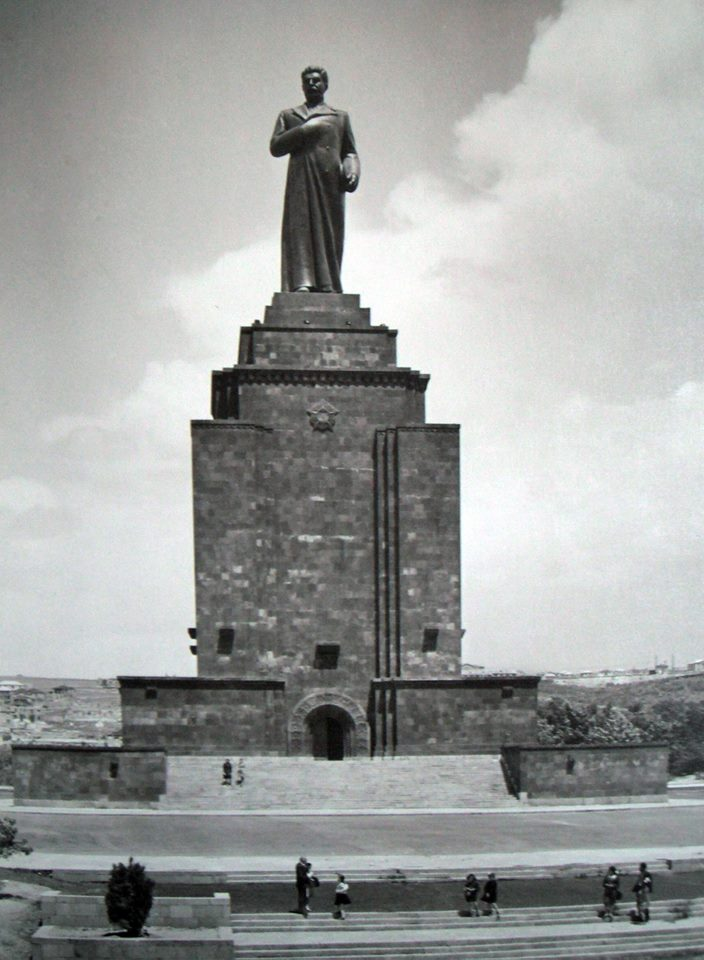
The Statue of Stalin in Yerevan, removed in 1962 and replaced by Mother Armenia in 1967.

Armenian victims of the Great Purge included Armenian intellectuals, writers, artists, Bolshevik and later Soviet statesmen, military commanders, and religious figures. Orchestrated by Joseph Stalin, the Great Purge was a campaign of political repression and persecution in the Soviet Union against supposed "enemies of the people," including members of the Communist Party, the peasantry, writers and intellectuals, and other unaffiliated persons. The worst period, under NKVD head Nikolay Yezhov, was known as the Yezhovschina ('period of Yezhov'). In the years from 1936 to 1938, thousands of people suffered from Stalinist repressions in Soviet Armenia.

== History ==
The start of the Great Purge in Armenia is usually dated to 9 July 1936, with the assassination of Armenian First Secretary Aghasi Khanjian by Lavrentiy Beria in Tiflis (Tbilisi). The death was the result of a political struggle between Beria and Khanjian. At first, Beria framed Khanjian's death as "suicide," but soon condemned him for abetting "rabid nationalist elements among the Armenian intelligentsia."

After Khanjian's death, Beria promoted his loyalists in Armenia, Amatuni Amatuni as Armenian First Secretary and Khachik Mughdusi [hy] as chief of the Armenian NKVD. Under the command of Beria's allies, the campaign against "enemies" intensified. Many leading Armenian intellectuals were arrested, including Yeghishe Charents, Axel Bakunts, Vahan Totovents, Zabel Yesayan, Nersik Stepanyan [hy], and others. According to Amatuni in a June 1937 letter to Stalin, 1,365 people were arrested in the ten months after the death of Khanjian, among them 900 "Dashnak-Trotskiites." Association with the Specifist movement was a common charge during this period and Amatuni often "framed the repressions as part of the ideological struggle against the Specifists." The Armenian leadership of the Nagorno-Karabakh Autonomous Oblast (NKAO) also suffered in the repressions. Under Azerbaijani First Secretary Mir Jafar Baghirov, several NKAO leaders were arrested, including local party chairman Suren Badamyan [ru].

The death of Sahak Ter-Gabrielyan in August 1937 was a turning point in the repressions in Armenia. While being interrogated by Mughdusi's men, Ter-Gabrielyan "either jumped or was pushed from the third-floor window" of the NKVD building in Yerevan. Stalin was angered that Mughdusi and Amatuni neglected to inform him about the incident. In response, in September 1937, he sent Georgy Malenkov, Mikhail Litvin [ru], and later Anastas Mikoyan to oversee a purge of the Communist Party of Armenia. During the trip, Mikoyan tried, but failed, to save one individual (Danush Shahverdyan) from the repressions. More than a thousand people were arrested and seven of nine members of the Armenian Politburo were sacked from office. The trip resulted in the appointment of a new Armenian Party leadership, headed by Grigory Arutinov, who was approved by Beria.

The Armenian Apostolic Church was not spared from the repressions. Soviet attacks against the Church under Stalin were known since 1929, but momentarily eased to improve the Soviet Union's relations with the Armenian diaspora. In 1932, Khoren I became Catholicos of All Armenians and assumed the leadership of the church. However, in the late 1930s, the Armenian NKVD, led by Mughdusi and his successor, Viktor Khvorostyan [ru], renewed the attacks against the Church. These attacks culminated in the 1938 murder of Khoren and the closing of the Catholicate of Etchmiadzin, an act for which Beria is usually held responsible. However, the Church survived and was later revived when Stalin eased restrictions on religion at the end of World War II. In addition to the repression of the Church, thousands of Armenians were forcibly exiled to the Altai Krai in 1949. Many were repatriated Armenians who arrived from the Armenian diaspora.

After Stalin's death, Anastas Mikoyan called for the rehabilitation of Charents in a speech in Yerevan on 11 March 1954, beginning de-Stalinization and the Thaw in Armenia. Behind the scenes, Mikoyan personally assisted Armenian leaders in the rehabilitation of countless former "enemies" in the republic. Armenian party scholar Lev Shaumyan, the son of Stepan Shaumian, also played an influential role in assisting Mikoyan and Nikita Khrushchev on rehabilitations, in advance of Khrushchev's "Secret Speech" at the 20th Party Congress in February 1956.

== List ==
Below is the incomplete list of persons from the Armenian SSR, or persons of ethnic Armenian origin, who became victims of Stalinism and died during the Great Purge. This list does not include those individuals, such as Vahram Alazan, Gurgen Mahari, and Vagharshak Norents [hy], who survived the repressions and the Gulag.

| Death date | Name | Photo | Occupation | Rehabilitation |
|---|---|---|---|---|
| 9 July 1936 | Aghasi Khanjian | | First Secretary of the Communist Party of Armenia, 1930-1936 | 17 January 1956 |
| 25 August 1936 | Vagarshak Ter-Vaganyan | | Bolshevik revolutionary | 13 June 1988 |
| 8 July 1937 | Axel Bakunts | | Writer | 2 March 1955 |
| 8 July 1937 | Nersik Stepanyan [hy] | | Soviet economist, statesman | 9 June 1956 |
| 8 July 1937 | Drastamat Ter-Simonyan [hy] | | Bolshevik revolutionary, statesman, publicist | 9 June 1956 |
| 21 August 1937 | Sahak Ter-Gabrielyan | | Bolshevik revolutionary | 26 April 1956 |
| 1937 | Sarkis Kasyan | | Bolshevik revolutionary | |
| 20 September 1937 | Lev Karakhan | | Bolshevik revolutionary | |
| 22 November 1937 | Movses Silikyan | | Military commander in the Russian and Armenian armies | 10 November 1987 |
| 27 November 1937 | Yeghishe Charents | | Poet, "the main Armenian poet of the 20th century" | 25 May 1955 (Note: Earlier exonerated by Anastas Mikoyan in his Yerevan speech of 11 March 1954.) |
| 27 November 1937 | Ruben Rubenov | | Politician, First Secretary of the Communist Party of Azerbaijan, 1933 | 17 November 1954 |
| 10 December 1937 | Christophor Araratov | | Military commander in the Russian and Armenian armies | 18 July 1956 |
| 11 December 1937 | Hayk Bzhishkyan | | Bolshevik revolutionary, military commander | 21 January 1956 |
| 11 December 1937 | Sargis Lukashin | | Statesman, Chairman of the Council of People's Commissars of Armenia, 1922-1925 | 29 February 1956 |
| 13 February 1938 | Gevorg Alikhanyan | | Statesman, First Secretary of the Communist Party of Armenia, 1920-21, stepfather of Yelena Bonner | 24 October 1954 |
| 19 March 1938 | Ashkharbek Kalantar | | Archaeologist | |
| 6 April 1938 | Khoren I | | Head of the Armenian Apostolic Church | |
| 21 April 1938 | Suren Shadunts | | Politician, First Secretary of the Communist Party of Tajikistan, 1934-1937 | 29 September 1956 |
| 18 July 1938 | Mushegh Danelyan [hy] | | Statesman, Chairman of the Council of People's Commissars of Armenia, 1937 | 24 September 1955 |
| 18 July 1938 | Vahan Totovents | | Writer | 29 January 1955 |
| 1 August 1938 | Alexander Bekzadyan | | Soviet politician | 11 February 1956 |
| 1938 | Hovhannes Katchaznouni | | Former Dashnak politician, Prime Minister of Armenia, 1918-1919 | |
| 26 February 1939 | Levon Mirzoyan | | Politician, First Secretary of the Communist Party of Azerbaijan, 1926-29; First Secretary of the Communist Party of Kazakhstan, 1937-38 | 10 December 1955 |
| 24 October 1941 | Danush Shahverdyan | | Armenian Bolshevik revolutionary, Soviet statesman | 25 September 1954 |
| 1943 | Zabel Yesayan | | Novelist | 9 January 1957 |

== See also ==
- Cascade Memorial to the Victims of Soviet Repression

== Bibliography ==
- Adalian, Rouben Paul (2010). Historical Dictionary of Armenia. Lanham, MD: Scarecrow Press. ISBN 978-0-8108-7450-3.
- Artizov, A. N.; Sigachev, Yu. V.; Khlopov, V. G.; Shevchuk, I. N., eds. (2000). Реабилитация: Как это было. Документы Президиума ЦК КПСС и другие материалы. Том 1. Март 1953 – февраль 1956 [Rehabilitation: How It Was: Documents of the Presidium of the CPSU Central Committee and Other Materials, Vol. 1: March 1953–February 1956] (in Russian). Moscow: Демократия, Материк. ISBN 5-85646-070-7.
- Coene, Frederik (2010). The Caucasus: An Introduction. London: Routledge. ISBN 9780415486606.
- Hayrapetyan, Kanakara (2018). "Ամենայն Հայոց Կաթողիկոս Խորէն Ա. Մուրադբեկյանի մահվան առեղծվածի վերլուծությունը պատմագիտության մեջ [Historiographical analysis of the mysterious death of Khoren I Muradbekyan, Catholicos of All Armenians]". Etchmiadzin (in Armenian). 75 (7). Archived from the original on 18 April 2019.
- Laycock, Jo (2016). "Survivor or Soviet Stories? Repatriate Narratives in Armenian Histories, Memories and Identities" (PDF). History and Memory. 28 (2): 123–151. doi:10.2979/histmemo.28.2.0123. ISSN 0935-560X. JSTOR 10.2979/histmemo.28.2.0123. S2CID 159467141.
- Manoukian, A.S. (18 September 2000). "Հայաստանի հասարակական-քաղաքական գործիչները ստալինյան բռնությունների տարիներին [Armenian public-political figures in the years of Stalin repressions]". Lraber Hasarakakan Gitutyunneri (in Armenian). 1 (1): 27–41. Archived from the original on 24 February 2021.
- Matossian, Mary Kilbourne (1962). The Impact of Soviet Policies in Armenia. Leiden: E.J. Brill.
- Payaslian, Simon (2007). The History of Armenia. New York: Palgrave Macmillan. ISBN 9781403974679.
- Polian, Pavel Markovich (2004). Against Their Will: The History and Geography of Forced Migrations in the USSR. Translated by Anna Yastrzhembska. Budapest: Central European University Press. ISBN 9789639241688.
- Rogovin, Vadim (2009). Stalin's Terror of 1937-1938: Political Genocide in the USSR. Oak Park, MI: Mehring Books. ISBN 9781893638044.
- Sahakyan, Ruben (2012). "Գեներալ-լեյտենանտ Մովսես Սիլիկյան (կենսագրության անհայտ էջեր)" [Lieutenant-General Movses Silikyan (unknown pages of biography)]. Patma-Banasirakan Handes (in Armenian) (2): 63–74.
- Shakarian, Pietro A. (2025). Anastas Mikoyan: An Armenian Reformer in Khrushchev's Kremlin. Bloomington: Indiana University Press. ISBN 978-0253073556.
- Ter Minassian, Taline (2007). Erevan: La construction d'une capitale à l'époque soviétique (in French). Rennes: Presses universitaires de Rennes. ISBN 978-2753503694.
- Tucker, Robert C. (1992). Stalin in Power: The Revolution from Above, 1928–1941. New York: W. W. Norton & Company. ISBN 978-0-393-30869-3. LCCN 89078047. OCLC 26298147.
- Walker, Christopher J. (1990). Armenia: The Survival of a Nation (2nd ed.). New York: St. Martin's Press. ISBN 978-0-312-04230-1.
