= Sahak Ter-Gabrielyan =

Armenian Old Bolshevik and Soviet politician (1886–1937)

- Սահակ Տեր-Գաբրիելյան
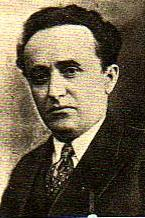

Chairman of the Council of People's Commissars of Armenia
- In office 22 March 1928 – 10 February 1935
- Preceded by: Sargis Hambardzumyan
- Succeeded by: Abraham Guloyan

Personal details
- Born: 27 February 1886 Shushi, Elizavetpol Governorate, Russian Empire
- Died: 21 August 1937 (aged 51) Yerevan, Armenian SSR, Soviet Union
- Party: Russian Social Democratic Labour Party (from 1902); All-Union Communist Party (Bolshevik)

Sahak Mirzayi Ter-Gabrielyan (Armenian: Սահակ Միրզայի Տեր-Գաբրիելյան; 27 February [O.S. 15 February] 1886 – 21 August 1937) was an Armenian Old Bolshevik and Soviet politician.

== Biography ==
A native of Nagorno-Karabakh, Ter-Gabrielyan was born in Shushi to the family of a tailor. He became a member of the Russian Social Democratic Labour Party in 1902. From 1904, he was a communist activist in Baku. In 1918 during the period of the Baku Commune, he was the minister of oil and the chairman of the Emergency Commission. In 1920 he served as a member of the Revolutionary Committee of Armenia, then in 1921 became the permanent representative of Armenian SSR (later from 1923 to 1928 – of the Transcaucasian SFSR) in the Russian SFSR. From 1928 to 1935 he was the Chairman of the Council of People's Commissars of Armenian SSR (equivalent of prime minister).

In 1931, Ter-Gabrielyan openly opposed Joseph Stalin's decision to appoint Lavrentiy Beria second secretary of the Communist Party's regional committee of the Transcaucasian SFSR. He was known to refer to Beria as "an upstart, an adventurer, a forceful brute," and "a dangerous bastard." On 25 June 1937, Ter-Gabrielyan fell victim to the Great Purge and was arrested in Moscow. He was kept at Butyrka prison and "transferred to Armenia on July 3." While under NKVD interrogation, Ter-Gabrielyan "either jumped or was pushed from the third-floor window" of the Armenian NKVD building in Yerevan on 21 August. He was posthumously rehabilitated during the Khrushchev Thaw on 26 April 1956.

== See also ==
- Armenian victims of the Great Purge
