= Nune Tumanyan =

Armenian sculptress (born 1963)

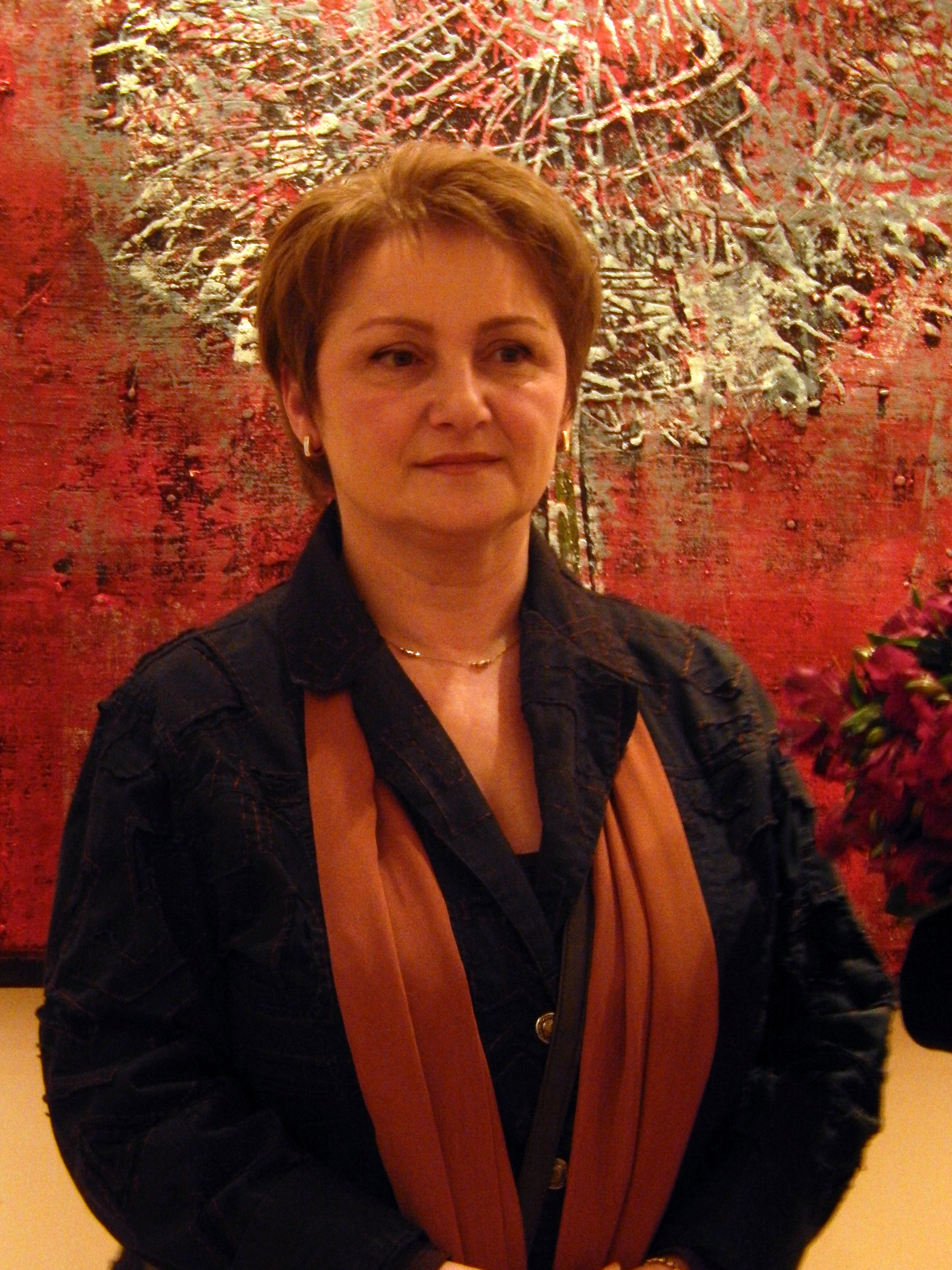
- Born: Nune Tumanyan; October 23, 1963 (age 62); Yerevan, Armenia
- Known for: sculptures

Nune Tumanyan (Armenian: Նունե Թումանյան, born on October 23, 1963, in Yerevan) is an Armenian artist and sculptor.

== Career ==
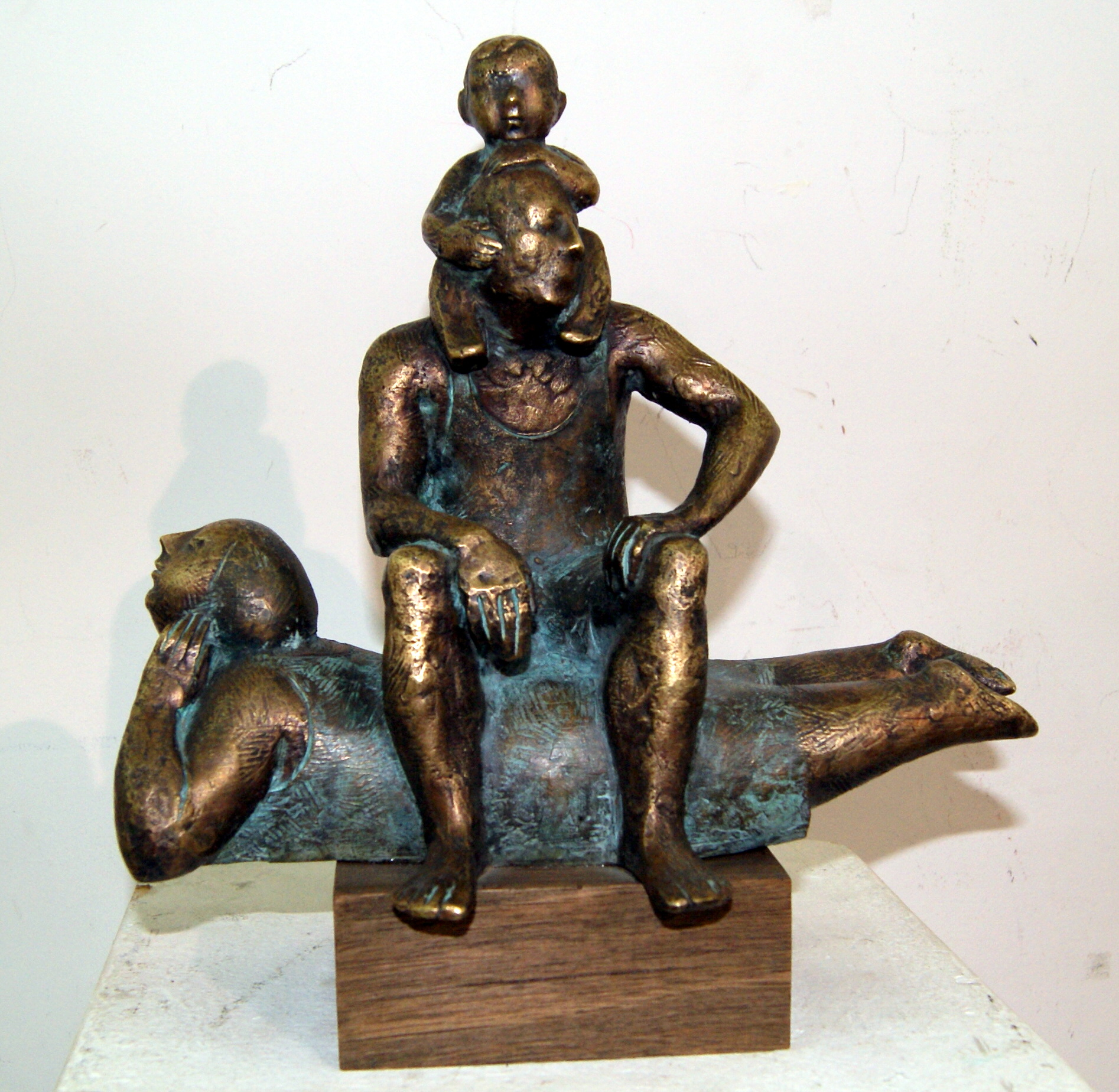
"Family"

Nune Tumanyan was born in 1963 in Yerevan. She graduated from the Art School after Hakob Kojoyan, later the Art College after Panos Terlemezyan. In 1984-1985 Tumanyan studied at the Art Academy after Repin in Leningrad (now St. Petersburg, Russia), department of sculpture. She received her master's degree from the Artistic-Theatrical Institute of Yerevan (now the Fine Arts Academy). Between 1995 and 2009 Tumanyan was an associate professor at the Fine Arts Academy. She is a member of the Artists’ Union of Armenia since 1996, and the head of the department of Sculpture of the Union since 2014. Tumanyan is a participant of numerous national and international exhibitions and competitions. She is a winner of several international awards, including one at the “Dante City Gates” Biennale in Ravenna, Italy, in 1998. She was awarded with the main prize at the “Women and Art: Interpreting Peace” exhibition held in Sharjah, United Arab Emirates, in 2014.

Tumanyan’s works are held in both private and corporate collections worldwide, including the National Gallery of Armenia. The medium of Tumanyan’s works is mostly bronze, at times in combination with other media like glass, wood, stone, etc. Admirers of her work believe that it expresses the infinitely rich spiritual world of man – a world, which, knowing no peace and quiet, is constantly in motion, in conflicts, is full of delights, doubts, frustration. Each of Tumanyan’s works is a complicated creative process, which inevitably brings to a clear expressive solution, characteristic of her own artistic individuality. Through her work, some see the sculptor as an artist, thinking in large-scale categories. Through the fragile poetic shell of her works, the significance of the basic idea always shows, which touches upon and half-opens the concealed sides of a human soul.

== Exhibitions ==
Tumanyan's works has been exhibited in different art galleries in Armenia and abroad: National Art Gallery, Armenia, Charents Museum, Yerevan, Artists Union of Armenia, UN Residence in Armenia, Boyajyan Gallery, Leningrad, Italy, Sharjah, UAE.

== See also ==
- List of Armenian artists
- List of Armenians
- Culture of Armenia
