= Amatuni Amatuni =

Soviet Armenian politician (1900–1938)

- Ամատունի Ամատունի
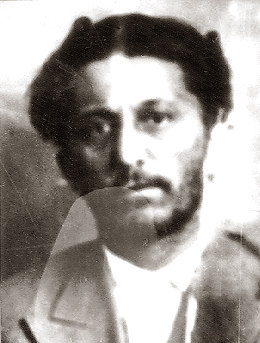
- Amatuni after his arrest in 1937

First Secretary of the Communist Party of Armenia
- In office 13 July 1936 – 21 September 1937
- Preceded by: Aghasi Khanjian
- Succeeded by: Grigory Arutinov

Personal details
- Born: Amatuni Vardapetyan; 24 October 1900 Elizavetpol, Elizavetpol uezd, Elizavetpol Governorate, Russian Empire
- Died: 28 July 1938 (aged 37) Kommunarka shooting ground, Moscow Oblast, Russian SFSR, Soviet Union

Amatuni Simoni Amatuni (Armenian: Ամատունի Սիմոնի Ամատունի; 24 October 1900 – 28 July 1938), born Amatuni Vardapetyan (Armenian: Ամատունի Վարդապետյան), was a Soviet Armenian politician who served as First Secretary of the Communist Party of Armenia from 1936 to 1937.

== Biography ==
Amatuni was born in Elizavetpol (Ganja), Elizavetpol Governorate, Russian Empire. After serving on the Caucasian Front in World War I, he returned to the Caucasus and later became a member of the Bolshevik Party in June 1919. From 1926 to 1927, he studied at the Institute of Red Professors, then held various party positions in Yerevan, Tiflis, and Baku.

An ally of Lavrentiy Beria, Amatuni served as Second Secretary of the Communist Party of Armenia from 1935 to 1936, then became First Secretary in 1936 after the death of Aghasi Khanjian. With Armenian NKVD chief Khachik Mughdusi [hy], Amatuni oversaw the initial part of the Great Purge in Armenia, including the arrest of prominent figures such as Yeghishe Charents, Axel Bakunts, and Vahan Totovents. Amatuni himself was eventually arrested on 23 September 1937 by Georgy Malenkov, on the personal orders of Joseph Stalin. His former patron, Beria, supervised his interrogation. Amatuni was executed on 28 July 1938. Despite his active role in the Stalinist repressions, he was posthumously rehabilitated in 1977.

== Bibliography ==
- Medvedev, Roy Aleksandrovich (1989). Let History Judge: The Origins and Consequences of Stalinism. Translated by Shriver, George. New York: Columbia University Press. ISBN 9780231063500.
- Shakarian, Pietro A. (2025). Anastas Mikoyan: An Armenian Reformer in Khrushchev's Kremlin. Bloomington: Indiana University Press. ISBN 978-0253073556.
