= Ghazaryan =

Ghazaryan (Armenian: Ղազարյան), or the Western Armenian variant Ghazarian (Ղազարեան), is an Armenian surname meaning "descendant of Ghazar", the Armenian equivalent of Lazarus. It may refer to:

Ghazaryan

- Arman Ghazaryan (born 2001), Armenian footballer
- Armen Ghazaryan (born 1982), Armenian and Russian weightlifter
- Ashot Ghazaryan (born 1949), Armenian singer, showman, presenter, and actor
- David Ghazaryan (1989–2020), Armenian Lieutenant-Colonel
- Gevorg Ghazaryan (born 1988), Armenian footballer
- Gevorg Ghazaryan (politician), Armenian politician
- Hayk Ghazaryan (1930–2014), Armenian historian and professor
- Liana Ghazaryan (born 2000), Armenian footballer
- Luiza Ghazaryan (born 2000), Armenian footballer
- Manuk Ghazaryan (born 1961), Armenian politician
- Manvel Ghazaryan (born 1961), Armenian politician
- Marine Ghazaryan (born 1985), Armenian sprinter
- Mekhak Ghazaryan (born 1966), Soviet and Armenian boxer
- Rafael Ghazaryan (1924–2007), Armenian radio-physicist, academician and public activist
- Regina Ghazaryan (1915–1999), Armenian painter and public figure
- Sona Ghazaryan (born 1993), Armenian politician
- Stepan Ghazaryan (born 1985), Armenian footballer who plays goalkeeper for FC Banants
- Taguhi Ghazaryan (born 1991), Armenian Member of Parliament
- Vardan Ghazaryan (born 1969), Lebanese-Armenian football (soccer) player

Ghazarian

- Armenak Ghazarian (1864–1904), commonly known as Hrayr Dzhoghk, Armenian military leader, fedayee in the Ottoman Empire
- Hazel Ghazarian Skaggs (1920–2005), American author and composer
- Kevork Ghazarian (1870–1907), commonly known as Kevork Chavush or Gevorg Chaush, Armenian military leader, fedayee in the Ottoman Empire
- Kirk Ghazarian (born 2006), American chess grandmaster
- Salpi Ghazarian, former director of USC Institute of Armenian Studies
- Sona Ghazarian (born 1945), Armenian-Austrian operatic soprano singer

== See also ==
- Ghazi (disambiguation)
- Aga Zaryan
- Gazeran
- Hazaran
- Khazaran
