= Manvel =

Manvel may refer to:

== Places ==
- Manvel, North Dakota, a city in Grand Forks County, North Dakota, United States
- Manvel, Texas, a city in Brazoria County, Texas, United States
  - Manvel High School

== Surname ==
- Allen Manvel (1837–1893), American politician
- Lucie Manvel (1863–1943), French actress

== Given name ==
Manvel is an Armenian masculine given name. It is the Armenian spelling of Manuel. Notable people with the name include:

- Manvel Agaronyan (born 1997), Armenian footballer
- Manvel Badeyan (1957–2022), Armenian politician
- Manvel H. Davis (1891–1959), American politician
- Manvel Gamburyan (born 1981), Armenian MMA fighter
- Manvel Gasratjan (1924–2007), Russian historian
- Manvel Ghazaryan (born 1961), Armenian politician
- Manvel Grigoryan (1956–2020), Armenian general, politician and parliamentarian
- Manvel Khachatryan (born 2004), Armenian wrestler
- Manvel Mamoyan (born 1993), Armenian bodybuilder
- Manvel Ter-Pogosyan (born 1987), Armenian musician, songwriter and DJ
- Manvel Zulalyan (1929–2012), Armenian historian and academic
