= Axel Bakunts =

Armenian writer and public activist (1899–1937)

Axel Bakunts Ակսել Բակունց
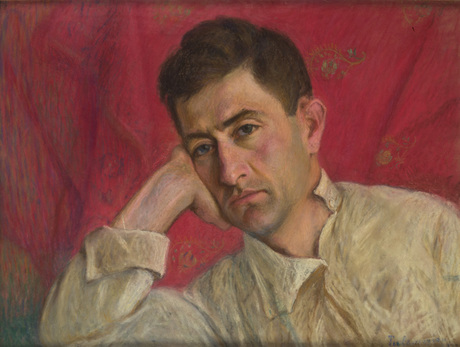
- Axel Bakunts by Panos Terlemezian, 1932
- Born: June 25, 1899; Goris, Zangezur uezd, Elizavetpol Governorate, Russian Empire
- Died: July 8, 1937 (aged 38); Yerevan, Armenian SSR, Soviet Union
- Occupations: Writer, public activist
- Writing career
- Language: Armenian

Axel Bakunts (Armenian: Ակսել Բակունց; June 25 [O.S. June 13], 1899 – July 8, 1937), born Aleksandr Stepani Tevosyan, was an Armenian prose writer, screenwriter, translator, and public activist.

== Biography ==
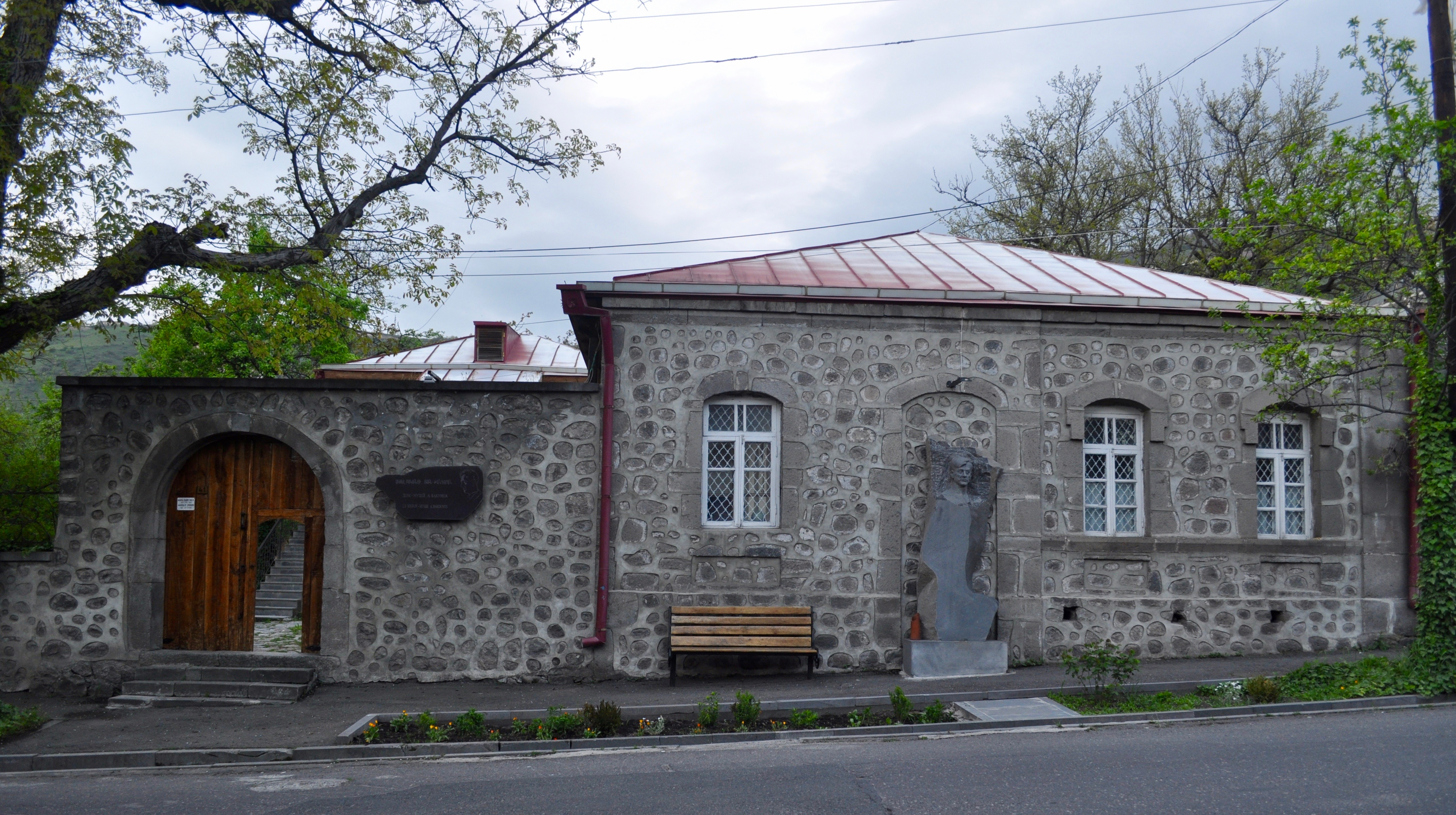
Axel Bakunts House Museum in Goris, Syunik, Armenia

Bakunts was born 1899 in Goris in Syunik, a region of Armenia that features prominently in his short stories. An excellent pupil, he was admitted to the Gevorgian Seminary at Echmiadzin in 1910, "free of tuition, upon pleas to the Catholicos by more than a hundred villagers." Always outspoken, Bakunts wrote his first publication, a satirical account of the mayor of Goris, in Shushi in 1915, an act that earned him a stint in jail. In 1915-1916, he worked as a teacher in the village school of Lor, near Sisian. After graduating from the seminary in 1917, Bakunts served as an Armenian volunteer in the battles of Erzurum, Kars, Surmalu, and Sardarabad. Between 1918 and 1919, Bakunts was a teacher, proof-reader, and reporter in Yerevan. From 1920 to 1923, he studied agriculture at the Kharkov Institute in Ukraine.

After the establishment of Soviet Armenia, Bakunts returned to Goris and worked as an agronomist. From 1926, he settled in Yerevan where he quickly established his reputation as a gifted writer. His oeuvre includes short story collections, various individual pieces, and fragments of unfinished novels, including one based on the life of Khachatur Abovian. His collection of short stories entitled Mtnadzor (The Dark Valley) was the first to "win him renown." Among his most famous works are Alpiakan manushak (The Alpine Violet), Lar Margar, Namak rusats takavorin (A Letter to the Russian Tsar), and Kyores. He also authored several screenplays for Armenkino in the 1930s, including the film Zangezur. At the same time, Bakunts played a politically important role in determining the borders between Armenian Zangezur and the Kurdistan Uezd of Soviet Azerbaijan during the period of the New Economic Policy.

Bakunts was a close colleague and friend of the poet Yeghishe Charents and "shared some of his opinions, both political and literary." Charents even wrote a poem on Bakunts, published posthumously in 1967. For his part, Bakunts dedicated The Alpine Violet to Charents's first wife, Arpenik. Although staunchly loyal to the USSR, Bakunts eventually fell victim to Joseph Stalin's Great Purge. Accused of various crimes, he was arrested on August 9, 1936 and executed on July 8, 1937. His trial is said to have been twenty-five-minutes. A committed communist to the end of his life, Bakunts "defiantly sang 'The Internationale' immediately before [his] execution", together with fellow arrestee Drastamat Ter-Simonyan [hy].

== Rehabilitation and legacy ==
Bakunts was posthumously rehabilitated during the Khrushchev Thaw on March 2, 1955. That same year, an anthology of his works was published for the first time since the late 1930s. His works have been translated into many languages, including Russian, English, German, French, Spanish, and Arabic. In 1968, the house in Goris where Bakunts grew up became a museum dedicated to his life and work. Today it operates as a branch of the Charents Museum of Literature and Arts.

== Bibliography ==
- Aghababyan, Suren (1976). "Բակունց, Ակսել". In Hambardzumyan, Viktor (ed.). Soviet Armenian Encyclopedia (in Armenian). Vol. 2. Yerevan: Armenian Academy of Sciences.
- Bardakjian, Kevork B. (2000). A Reference Guide to Modern Armenian Literature, 1500-1920. Detroit: Wayne State University Press. ISBN 0-8143-2747-8.
- Hacikyan, Agop J.; Basmajian, Gabriel; Franchuk, Edward S.; Ouzounian, Nourhan, eds. (2005). The Heritage of Armenian Literature: From The Eighteenth Century To Modern Times. Vol. 3. Detroit: Wayne State University Press. ISBN 0-8143-3221-8.
- Rowe, Victoria (2008). Preface. The Dark Valley: Short Stories. By Axel Bakunts. Translated by Nairi Hakhverdi. London: Taderon Press (Gomidas Institute). ISBN 978-1-903656-90-7.
- Shakarian, Pietro A. (2025). Anastas Mikoyan: An Armenian Reformer in Khrushchev's Kremlin. Bloomington: Indiana University Press. ISBN 978-0253073556.

== See also ==
- Armenian literature
- Armenian victims of the Great Purge
