= Voghjaberd =

Voghjaberd Ողջաբերդ
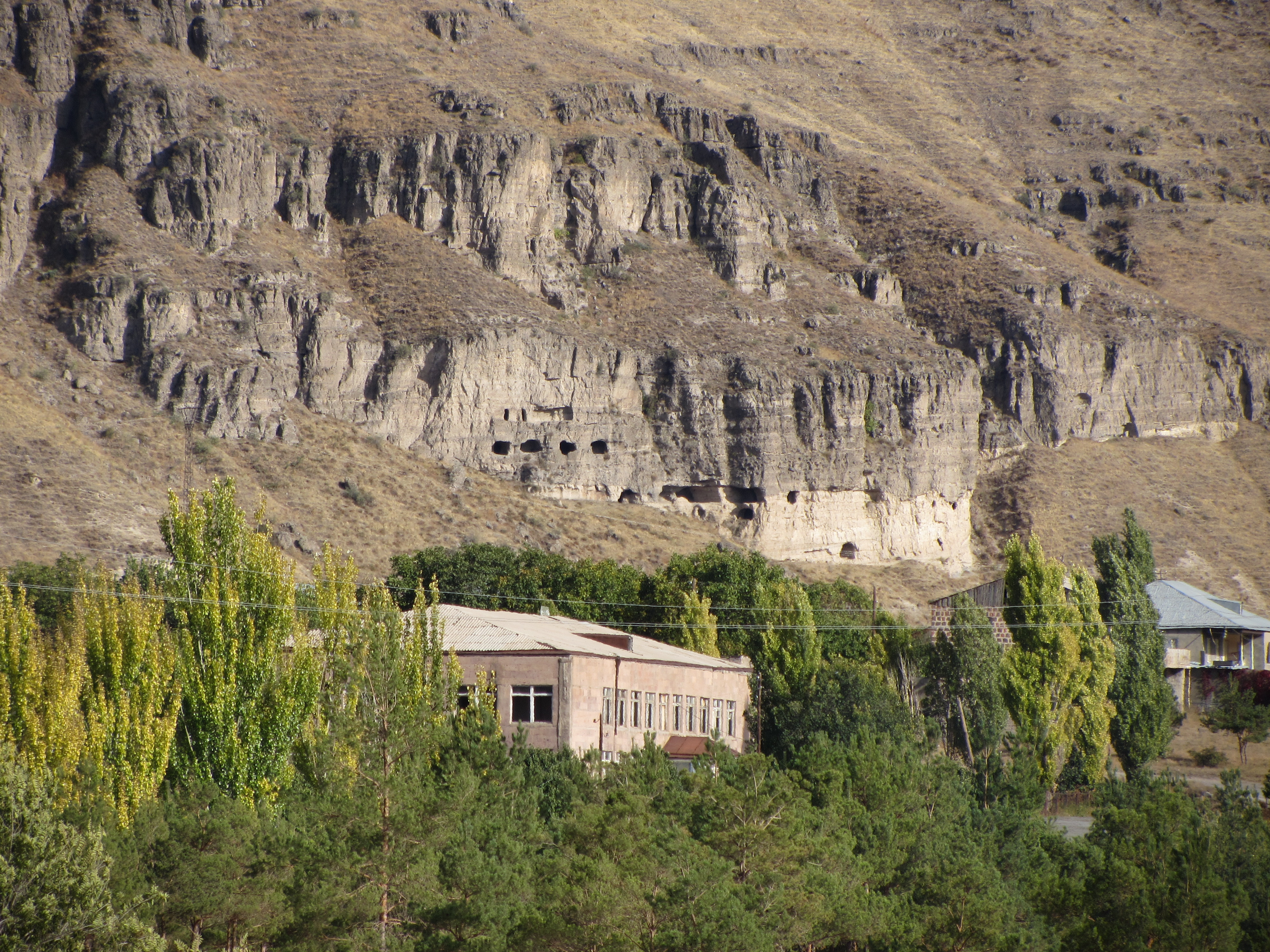
- Voghjaberd and the cave settlement

- Location within Armenia
- Coordinates: 40°09′59″N 44°38′54″E
- Country: Armenia
- Marz (Province): Kotayk
- Elevation: 1,700 m (5,600 ft)

Population (2011)
  - Total: 838
- Time zone: UTC+4 ( )
  - Summer (DST): UTC+5 ( )

Voghjaberd (Armenian: Ողջաբերդ, also Romanized as Vokhchaberd) is a village in the Kotayk Province of Armenia.

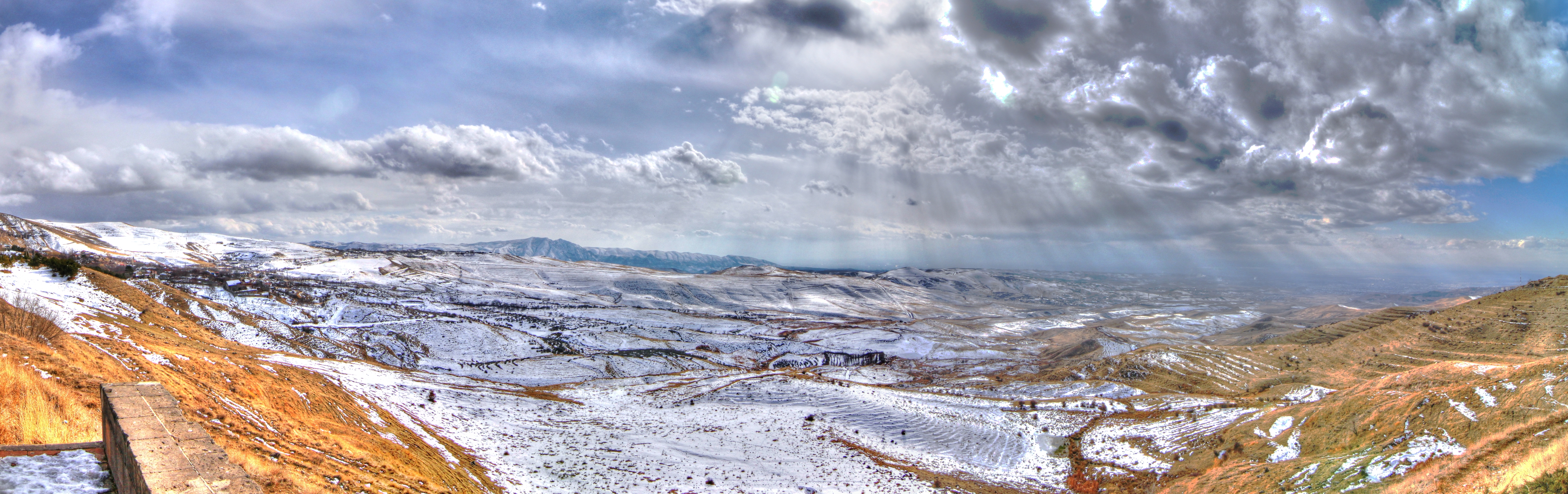
Panorama from Charents Arch in Voghjaberd

== See also ==
- Kotayk Province
