= Arpenik Charents =

Armenian writer

Arpenik Charents (Armenian: Արփենիկ Չարենց, July 25, 1932, Yerevan - February 12, 2008, Yerevan) was an Armenian writer, literary critic, specialist in Charents studies. She was a daughter of the poet Yeghishe Charents.

== Biography ==
After her parents' arrest in 1937 during the stalinist terror, she lived in The Kanaker Children's home. She studied philology at Yerevan State University. Arpenik was one of the main initiators and founders of the Yeghishe Charents House-Museum in Yerevan (also the chairwoman of the scientific council), recollected her father's 6000-volume library, researched and spread the literary work and life story of Yeghishe Charents all over the country. She wrote novels, short stories and memoirs about her sad childhood, and was a member of the Writers Union of Armenia.

== Books ==
- The Unknown Inside the Known, Yerevan, 2005
- My Universities, Yerevan, 2000
- The Prayers of Yeghishe Charents, Yerevan, 1999
- The Children's Home, Yerevan, 1994
