= Ghazaros =

Ghazaros is an Armenian given name. Notable people with the name include:

- Ghazaros Saryan, Armenian composer and educator
- Ghazaros Aghayan, Armenian writer, educator, folklorist, historian, linguist and public figure
- Ghazaros Aghajanian, Armenian Cardinal of the Catholic Church

== See also ==
- Ghazar
