= Yeghishe Charents =

Armenian poet, writer and public activist (1897–1937)

Yeghishe Charents Եղիշե Չարենց
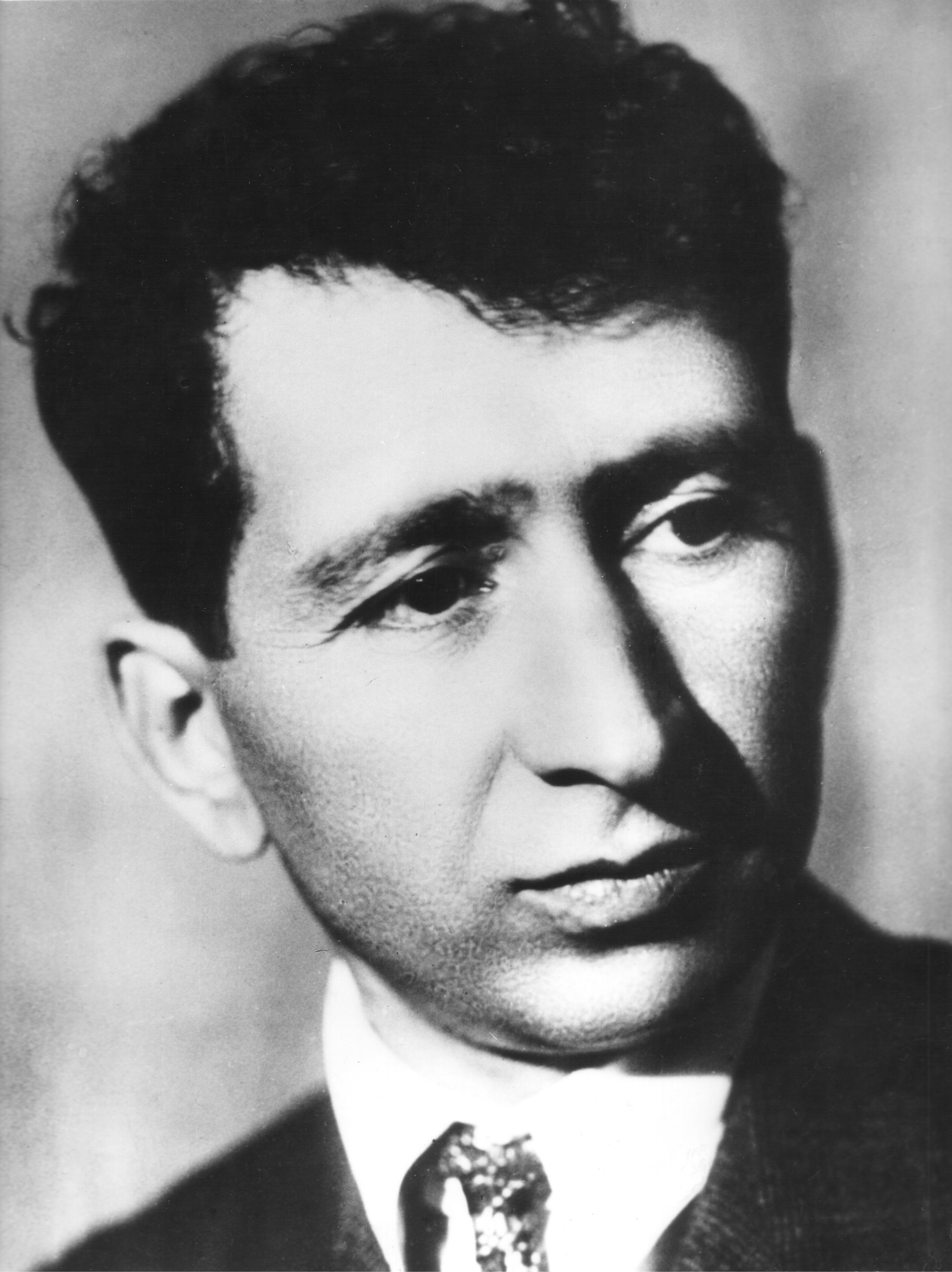
- Born: Yeghishe Soghomonyan; March 13, 1897; Kars, Kars Oblast, Russian Empire
- Died: November 27, 1937 (aged 40); Yerevan, Armenian SSR, Soviet Union
- Resting place: unknown
- Occupations: Poet, writer, translator, public activist
- Spouse: Izabella Charents
- Children: Anahit Charents and Arpenik Charents
- Writing career
- Language: Armenian

Yeghishe Charents (Armenian: Եղիշե Չարենց, romanized: Yeghishe Ch’arents’; 25 March [O.S. 13 March], 1897 – November 27, 1937) was an Armenian poet, writer, and public activist. Charents's literary subject matter ranged from his experiences in the First World War, the Russian Revolution, and frequently Armenia and Armenians. He is recognized as "the main poet of the 20th century" in Armenia.

An early proponent of communism and the USSR, the futurist Charents joined the Bolshevik Party and became an active supporter of Soviet Armenia, especially during the period of Lenin's New Economic Policy (NEP). However, he became disillusioned with direction of the Soviet Union under Joseph Stalin. He was arrested by the NKVD during the 1930s Great Purge, and died in 1937 due to severe health complications, including Morphinism. However, after Stalin's death, he was exonerated in a 1954 speech by Anastas Mikoyan and was officially rehabilitated by the Soviet state in 1955 during the Khrushchev Thaw.

== Biography ==
=== Early life ===
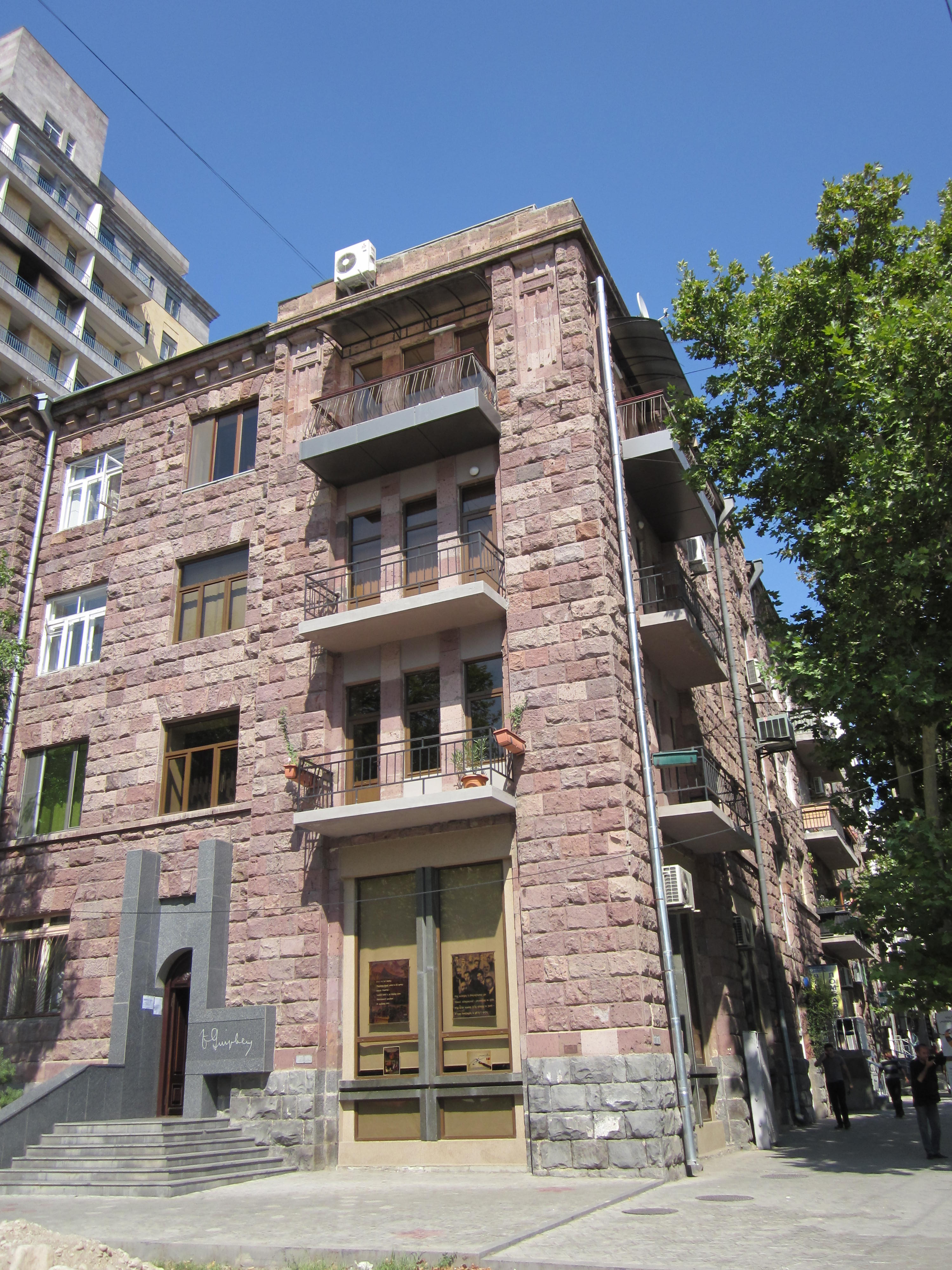
House-Museum of Charents in Yerevan

Yeghishe Charents was born Yeghishe Abgari Soghomonyan in Kars (then a part of the Russian Empire, now part of Turkey) in 1897 to a family involved in the rug trade. His family hailed from the Armenian community of Maku, Persian Armenia. He first attended an Armenian elementary school but later transferred to a Russian technical secondary school in Kars from 1908 to 1912. He spent much of his time reading. In 1912, he had his first poem published in the Armenian periodical Patani (Tiflis). In 1915, amid the upheavals of the First World War and the Armenian genocide in the Ottoman Empire, he volunteered to fight in a detachment on the Caucasian Front.

=== Political and literary development ===
Sent to Van in 1915, Charents was witness to the destruction that the Turkish garrison had laid upon the Armenian population, leaving indelible memories that would later be read in his poems. His long poem Danteakan araspel (Dantesque legend, published in 1916) tells the story of his experiences in 1915. Kevork Bardakjian writes that "Death, devastation, and innocent optimism contrast sharply" in this poem. He left the front one year later, attending school at the Shanyavski People's University in Moscow. The horrors of the war and genocide had scarred Charents and he became a fervent supporter of the Bolsheviks, seeing them as the one true hope for the salvation of Armenia.

Charents joined the Red Army and fought during the Russian Civil War as a rank-and-file soldier in Russia (Tsaritsyn) and the Caucasus. In 1919, he returned to Armenia and took part in revolutionary activities there. A year later, he began work at the Ministry of Education as the director of the Art Department. Charents would also once again take up arms, this time against his fellow Armenians, as a rebellion took place against Soviet rule in February 1921. One of his most famous poems, "Yes im anush Hayastani arevaham barn em sirum" ("I love the sun-flavored fruit [or name] (Note: Disagreement exists on whether Charents originally used the word բար bar 'fruit' or բառ baṛ 'word'. The academic edition of Charents's complete works used bar 'fruit'.) of my sweet Armenia"), a lyric ode to his homeland, was composed in 1920-1921. Charents returned to Moscow in 1921 to study at the Institute of literature and Arts founded by Valeri Bryusov. In a manifesto issued in June 1922, known as the "Declaration of the Three," signed by Charents, Gevorg Abov, and Azat Vshtuni, the young authors expressed their favour of "proletarian internationalism." In 1921-22 he wrote "Amenapoem" (Everyone's poem), and "Charents-name", an autobiographical poem.

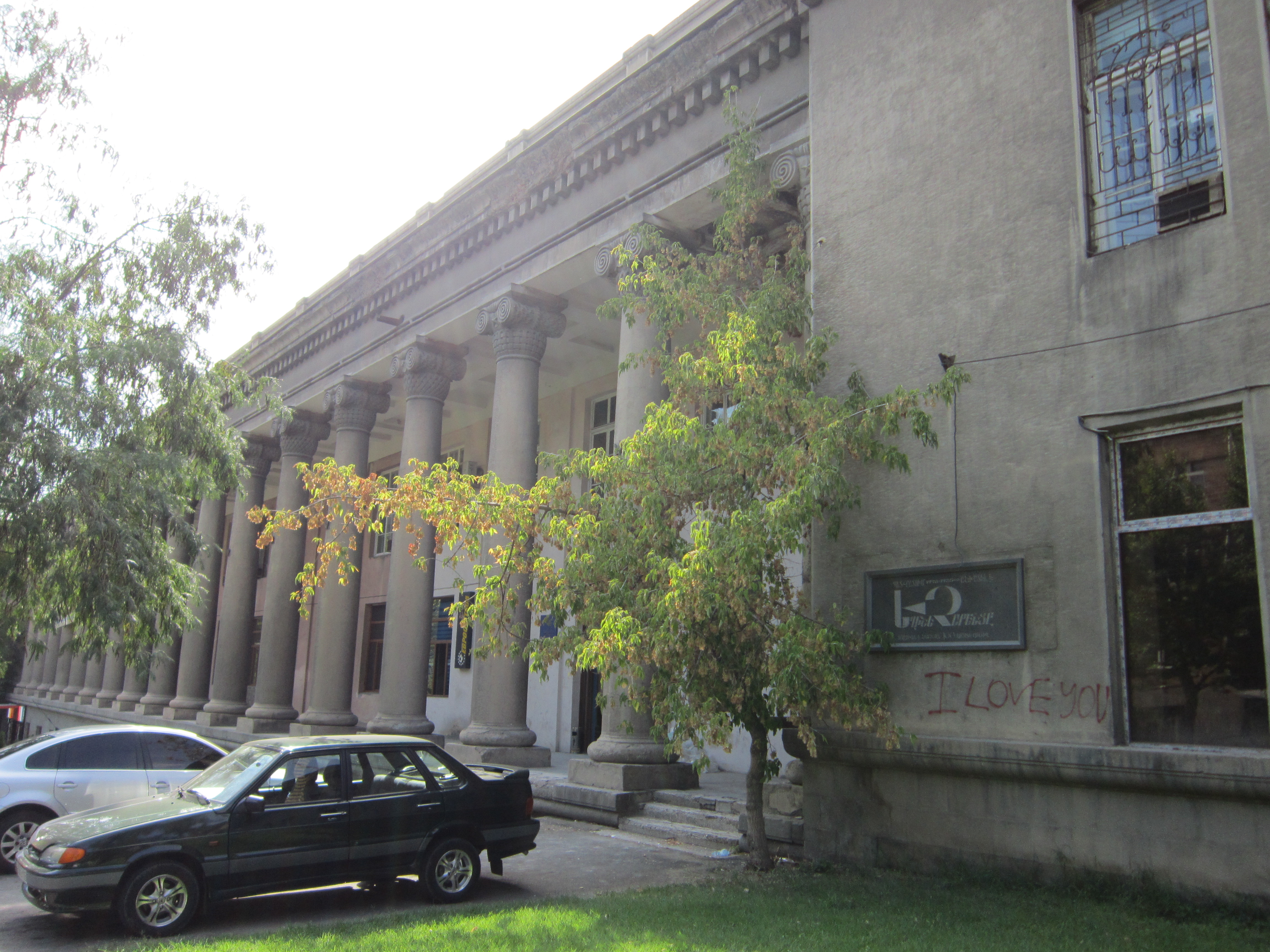
The building of State Publisher in Yerevan, where Charents worked from 1928 to 1935.

In 1924-1925, Charents went on a seven-month trip abroad, visiting Turkey, Italy (where he met Avetik Isahakyan), France, and Germany. When Charents returned, he founded a union of writers, November, and worked for the state publishing house from 1928 to 1935. In 1926, Charents published his satirical novel, Land of Nairi (Yerkir Nairi), which became a great success and repeatedly published in Russian in Moscow during his lifetime. In August 1934 Maxim Gorky presented him to the Soviet writers' first congress delegates with Here is our Land of Nairi. The first part of the work is dedicated to the description of public figures and places of Kars, and to the presentation of Armenian public sphere. According to Charents, his Yerkir Nairi is not visible, "it is an incomprehensible miracle: a horrifying secret, an amazing amazement." In the second part of novel, Kars and its leaders are seen during World War I, and the third part tells about the fall of Kars and the destruction of the dream.

On September 5, 1926, in a park in Yerevan, Charents shot and slightly wounded a sixteen-year-old girl, Marianna Ayvazyan, the sister of composer Artemi Ayvazyan. Charents was arrested and stated during interrogation that he was in love with Ayvazyan and had made a marriage proposal to her, which was rejected, which pushed him to attempt to kill her. According to author Zabel Yesayan, who was present at the trial, Charents testified that he had been in a severely agitated mental state—worsened by the consumption of alcohol—for weeks before the shooting. He explained his actions as the result of "the haunting of a certain idea" rather than of being in love, and he stated that he had been in a "nearly unconscious state" at the time of the act. On the basis of contemporary documentation, Charents's biographer Almast Zakaryan argues that Charents did not intend to kill Ayvazyan but rather committed the act in order to be expelled from the Communist Party; he was dissatisfied with the situation in the Soviet Union and had been denied permission to leave the country. He was convicted and sentenced to eight years in prison for the shooting, but this was subsequently reduced to three years' imprisonment. (Note: In her introduction to the 2021 publication of Yerevani ughghich tnits, Ani Hovnan expresses doubt about some of Zakaryan's conclusions.) Charents was released early in March 1927. He wrote an account of his time in prison titled Yerevani ughghich tnits (From the Yerevan correctional house), which was published in 1927.

Charents translated many works into Armenian. His translation of "The Internationale", with musical arrangement by Romanos Melikian, was published in Moscow in 1928. In 1930, Charents's book, Epic Dawn, which consisted of poems he wrote in 1927-30, was published in Yerevan. It was dedicated to his first wife Arpenik. His last collection of poems, "The Book of the Road", was printed in 1933, but its distribution was delayed by the Soviet government until 1934, when it was reissued with some revisions. In this book, the author lays out the panorama of Armenian history and reviews it part-by-part.

=== Final years and death ===
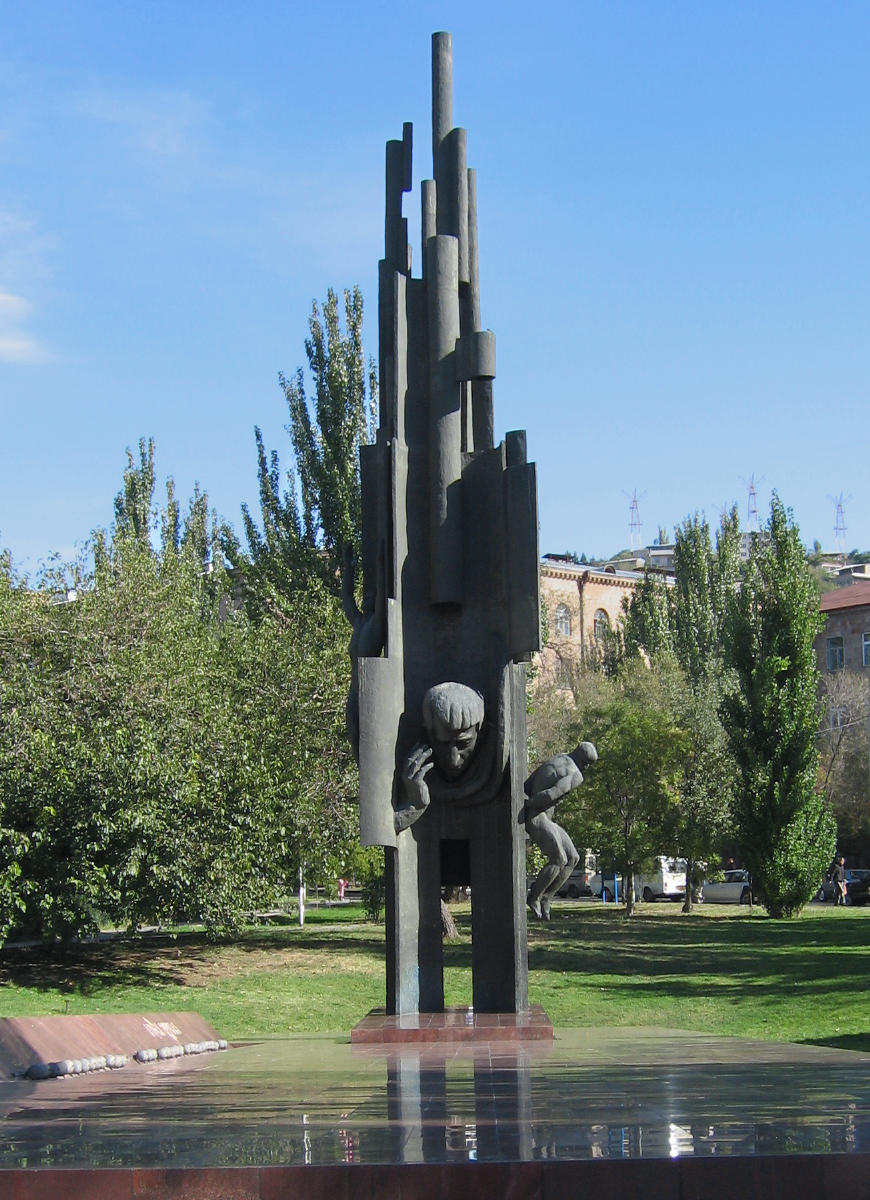
Monument in Yerevan

Except for a few poems in journals, Charents could publish nothing after 1934. At the same time, in December 1935, Stalin asked an Armenian delegation how Charents was doing. The poet became a morphine addict under the pressure of the campaign against him and because he was suffering from colic, caused by a kidney stone. Of her last visit to Charents, the actress Arus Voskanyan wrote: "He looked fragile but noble. He took some morphine and then read some Komitas. When I reached over to kiss his hand he was startled." When William Saroyan met Charents in Moscow in 1935, he found him "bursting with energy and ideas," but also "quite profoundly troubled in spirit and ill in body."

In July 1936, Charents's friend, Armenian First Secretary Aghasi Khanjian, was shot and killed by Lavrentiy Beria in Tiflis. Charents "saw the assassination at the hands of Beria as an ominous sign of the violence to come." In response, he wrote a series of seven sonnets in memory of Khanjian, titled "The Dauphin of Nairi". The death of Komitas also affected Charents and inspired him to write one of his last great works, "Requiem Æternam in Memory of Komitas".

A victim of the Great Purge, Charents was charged with "Trotskiite-nationalist" activity and arrested on July 27, 1937. He died in NKVD custody on November 27 of that same year due to severe health complications, under unclear circumstances. It is unknown where his body was buried. All his books were banned. Charents's younger friend Regina Ghazaryan buried and saved many of his manuscripts.

=== Personal life ===
His first wife was Arpenik Ter-Astvatsatryan, who died in 1927. In 1931, Charents married Izabella Kodabashyan. They had two daughters, Arpenik and Anahit (b. 1935).

In 1988, scholar James R. Russell travelled to Armenia, where he met writer Artashes Emin. Emin produced Charents manuscripts which were safeguarded by his father, poet Gevorg Emin. These manuscripts included homoerotic poetry, leading to Russell's speculation that Charents may have been bisexual. Russell's theory led to claims of defamation in Armenia.

== Rehabilitation and legacy ==
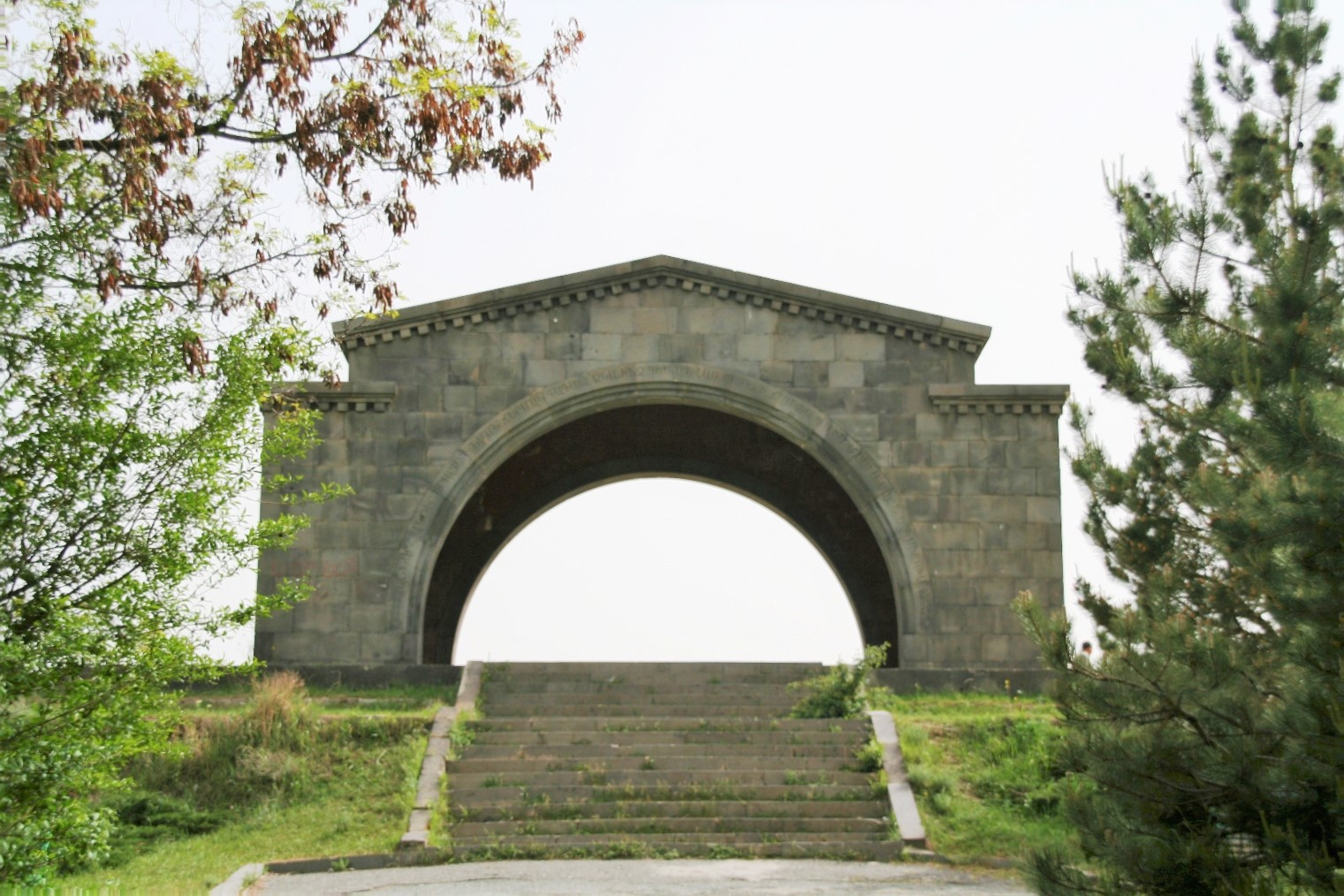
The Charents Arch by Rafayel Israyelian, honoring Charents after his rehabilitation

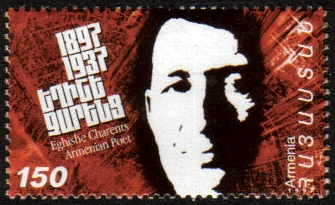
1997 Armenian stamp, commemorating Charents

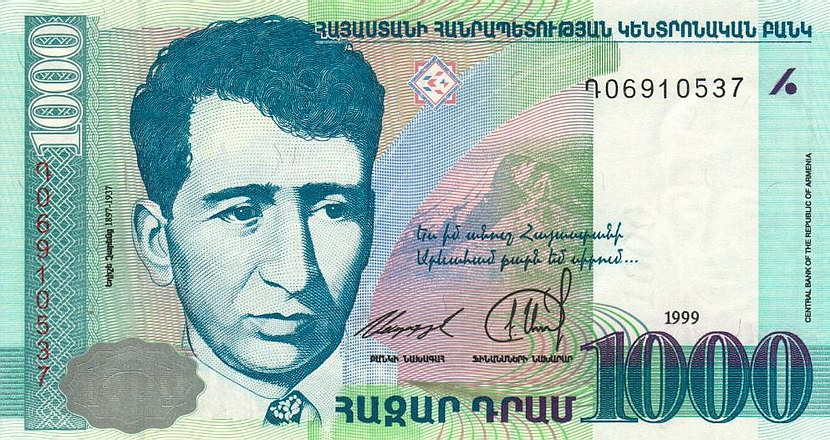
1000 Armenian drams honoring Charents

After Stalin's death, Anastas Mikoyan called for the rehabilitation of Charents in a speech in Yerevan on March 11, 1954, two years before Nikita Khrushchev's "Secret Speech". Although Charents was not officially rehabilitated until May 25, 1955, the rehabilitation report of Axel Bakunts claimed that Mikoyan's address had "already de facto rehabilitated the poet." The speech inspired Regina Ghazaryan to remove Charents's manuscripts from hiding.

Charents was soon restored to the "foremost position in the Soviet Armenian literary canon." In a speech before the 20th Congress of the CPSU in 1956, Armenian First Secretary Suren Tovmasyan lauded Charents and "recalled the poet's quote casting Moscow as the 'center of the world.'" The following year, in 1957, the architect Rafayel Israyelian completed the Charents Arch, in memory of the writer. In May 1961, Khrushchev himself praised Charents "as an 'outstanding representative' of Armenian literature" of during his state visit to Armenia. The Armenian town of Lusavan was renamed Charentsavan after the poet in September 1967, on the recommendation of Mikoyan. Charents's home at 17 Mashtots Avenue in Yerevan was turned into the Yeghishe Charents House-Museum by the Soviet Armenian government in 1975.

After his rehabilitation, Soviet authorities issued a commemorative stamp of 40 kopecks honoring Charents in 1958. Another commemorative stamp of 150 Armenian drams as well as a commemorative coin of 100 Armenian drams were issued by the Republic of Armenia in 1997. The former Armenian currency denomination for 1000 drams carried on one of its two sides the photo of Charents and a famous quotation in Armenian from one of his most celebrated poems: "Yes im anush Hayastani arevaham barn em sirum" ("I love the sun-flavored fruit [or name] of my sweet Armenia"). Pope Francis during his visit to Armenia in 2016 recited a passage from that poem of Charents.

Charents's works have been translated into Russian by Valeri Bryusov, Anna Akhmatova, Boris Pasternak, and Arseny Tarkovsky; into French by Louis Aragon; and into English by Marzbed Margossian, Diana Der Hovanessian, and others. William Saroyan dedicated a chapter to Charents in his Letters from 74 rue Taitbout. In cinema, Charents was portrayed by Azat Gasparyan [hy] in Frunze Dovlatyan's 1976 film Delivery (Yerkunk), about Alexander Miasnikian's efforts to rebuild NEP-era Soviet Armenia.

== Selected works ==
- "Three songs to the sad and pale girl...", poems (1914)
- "Blue-eyed Homeland", poem (1915)
- "Dantesque legend", poem (1915–1916)
- "Soma", poem (1918)
- "Charents-Name", poem (1922)
- "Uncle Lenin", poem (1924)
- "Country of Nairi" (Yerkir Nairi) (1926)
- "Epical Sunrise", poems (1930)
- "Book of the Way", poems (1933–34)
- "Ars poetica", poems (1919-1928)

== See also ==
- Armenian literature
- Armenian victims of the Great Purge

== Bibliography ==
- Adalian, Rouben Paul (2010). Historical Dictionary of Armenia. Lanham, Maryland: Scarecrow Press. ISBN 978-0-8108-7450-3.
- Aghababyan, Suren (1982). "Չարենց, Եղիշե Աբգարի". In Hambardzumyan, Viktor (ed.). Soviet Armenian Encyclopedia (in Armenian). Vol. 8. Yerevan: Armenian Academy of Sciences.
- Babayan, L. (1978). "Իսրայելյան, Ռաֆայել Սարգսի". In Hambardzumyan, Viktor (ed.). Soviet Armenian Encyclopedia (in Armenian). Vol. 4. Yerevan: Armenian Academy of Sciences.
- Bardakjian, Kevork B. (2000). A Reference Guide to Modern Armenian Literature, 1500-1920. Detroit: Wayne State University Press. ISBN 0-8143-2747-8.
- Beledian, Krikor (2014). "Kara-Darvish and Armenian Futurism". International Yearbook of Futurism Studies. 4: 263–300. doi:10.1515/futur-2014-0025. ISBN 978-3-11-033400-5.
- Charents, Anahit (2003). "Yeghishe Charents's Final Years: His Life and Work from 1934 to 1937". In Marc Nichanian; Vartan Matiossian (eds.). Yeghishe Charents: Poet of the Revolution. Costa Mesa, CA: Mazda Publishers. ISBN 1-56859-112-8.
- Charents, Yeghishe (2021). Erevani ughghichʻ tnitsʻ Երևանի ուղղիչ տնից [From the Yerevan correctional house] (in Armenian). Introduction by Ani Hovnan; notes by Armen Sargsyan. Yerevan: Vernatun. ISBN 978-9939-9242-5-0.
- Charents, Yeghishe (1966). Aghababyan, S. B. (ed.). Erkeri zhoghovatsu Երկերի ժողովածու [Collected works] (in Armenian). Vol. 5. Yerevan: HSSṚ GA hratarakchʻutʻyun – via Pan-Armenian Digital Library.
- Coene, Frederik (2010). The Caucasus: An Introduction. London: Routledge. ISBN 9780415486606.
- Der Hovanessian, Diana; Margossian, Marzbed, eds. (1986). Eghishe Charents: Land of Fire, Selected Poems. Ann Arbor: Ardis. ISBN 978-0882339221.
- Galstyan, Siranush (2016). Cinema of Armenia: An Overview. Costa Mesa: Mazda. ISBN 978-1568593029.
- Gasparyan, Davit (2008). Yeghishe Charents Memorial Museum. Yerevan: Pera Print. ISBN 978-99941-874-0-9.
- Hacikyan, Agop J.; Basmajian, Gabriel; Franchuk, Edward S.; Ouzounian, Nourhan, eds. (2005). The Heritage of Armenian Literature: From The Eighteenth Century To Modern Times. Vol. 3. Detroit: Wayne State University Press. ISBN 0-8143-3221-8.
- Hambardzumyan, Viktor, ed. (1978). "Ինտերնացիոնալ". Soviet Armenian Encyclopedia (in Armenian). Vol. 4. Yerevan: Armenian Academy of Sciences.
- Harutyunyan, Angela; Hörschelmann, Kathrin; Miles, Malcolm, eds. (2009). Public Spheres After Socialism. Bristol: Intellect Books.
- Khachatryan, Meri (2007). "E. Chʻarentsʻi «Erevani ughghichʻ tnitsʻ» pʻastagrakan vipaki orpes inkʻnakensagrakan tekʻsti zhanrayin aṛandznahatkutʻyunnyerě" Ե. Չարենցի «Երևանի ուղղիչ տնից» փաստագրական վիպակի՝ որպես ինքնակենսագրական տեքստի ժանրային առանձնահատկությունները [The genre specificities of Y. Charents's documentary novella Yerevani ughghich tnits as an autobiographical text]. Kantegh (in Armenian). 3: 30–36 – via Pan-Armenian Digital Library.
- Matossian, Mary Kilbourne (1962). The Impact of Soviet Policies in Armenia. Leiden: E.J. Brill.
- Nichanian, Marc (2002). Writers of Disaster: Armenian Literature in the Twentieth Century, Vol. 1. Taderon (Gomidas Institute). ISBN 978-1903656099.
- Nichanian, Marc (2003). "Poetry and Revolution". In Marc Nichanian; Vartan Matiossian (eds.). Yeghishe Charents: Poet of the Revolution. Costa Mesa, CA: Mazda Publishers. ISBN 1-56859-112-8.
- Saroyan, William (1954). "Hayastan and Charentz" (PDF). The Armenian Review. 7 (4): 12–16.
- Shakarian, Pietro A. (2025). Anastas Mikoyan: An Armenian Reformer in Khrushchev's Kremlin. Bloomington: Indiana University Press. ISBN 978-0253073556.
- Zakaryan, Almast (2008). Eghishe Chʻarentsʻ: kyankʻě, gortsě, zhamanakě Եղիշե Չարենց. կյանքը, գործը, ժամանակը [Yeghishe Charents: life, work and times]. Vol. 3. Yerevan: Yeghishe Charents House-Museum. ISBN 9789994184620.
