= Yeghishe Charents House-Museum =

- Եղիշե Չարենցի տուն-թանգարան
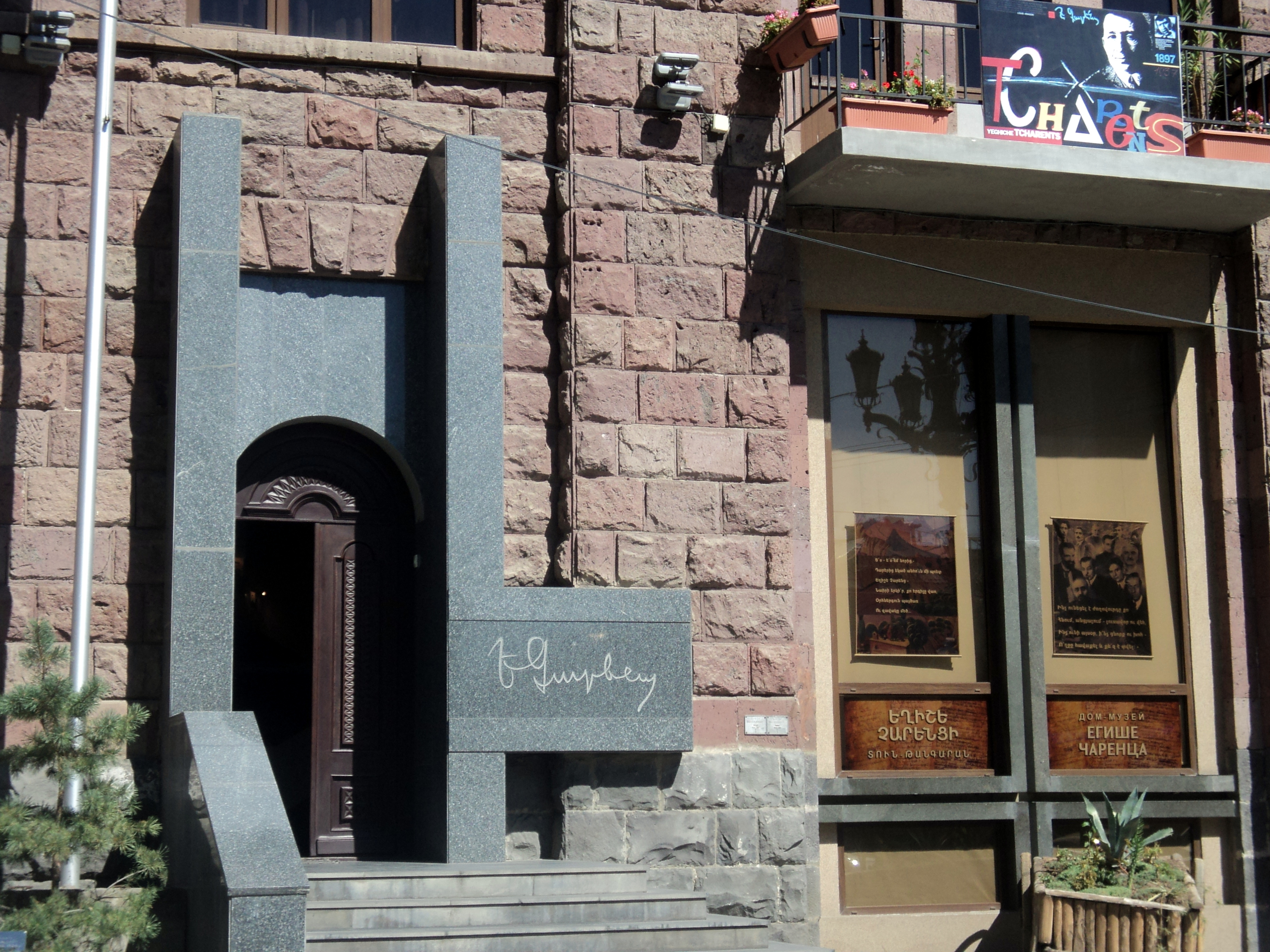
- Established: 1964
- Location: 17 Mashtots Avenue, Yerevan, Armenia
- Type: House museum
- Director: Zhanna Manukyan
- Website: charents.am

Yeghishe Charents House Museum (Armenian: Եղիշե Չարենցի տուն-թանգարան (Yehishe Charents'i tun-t'angaran)), also known as the Yeghishe Charents Memorial Museum, is the house museum in Yerevan, Armenia where the poet Yeghishe Charents lived from 1935 to 1937.

== History ==
On 11 March 1954, Anastas Mikoyan called for the rehabilitation of Charents in a speech in Yerevan that preceded Nikita Khrushchev's "Secret Speech" by two years. Charents was officially rehabilitated by Soviet authorities one year later, on 25 May 1955, as part of the Khrushchev Thaw. As part of the rehabilitation process, the flat where Charents lived from 1935 to 1937 was turned into a house museum by the decree of the Council of Ministers of Soviet Armenia on 8 February 1964. Nvard Baghdasaryan was assigned to be the director of the museum. The poet's daughters Arpenik and Anahit supported the establishment and activity of the museum. The museum was opened to the public on 10 January 1975.

In 1987, on the occasion of the ninetieth anniversary of Charents, the flat underwent changes and the area of the museum was enlarged with the support of Armenian First Secretary Karen Demirchyan. Today the museum occupies an area of 626.3 m^{2}. The main exhibition occupies the three halls of the museum: Hall A (1897–1918), Hall B (1918–1927), and Hall C: (1928–1937).

== Collections ==
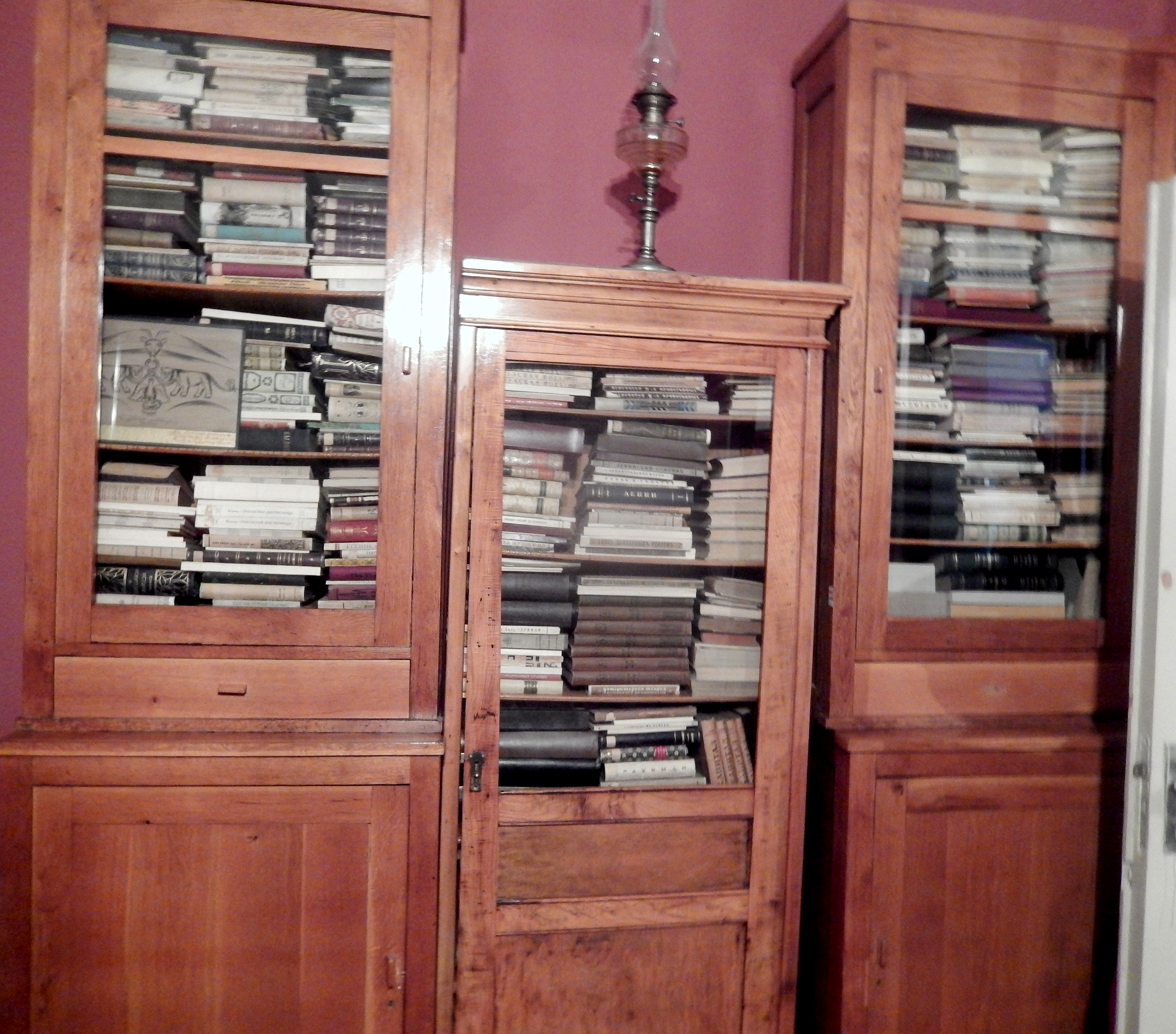
Yeghishe Charents' personal library

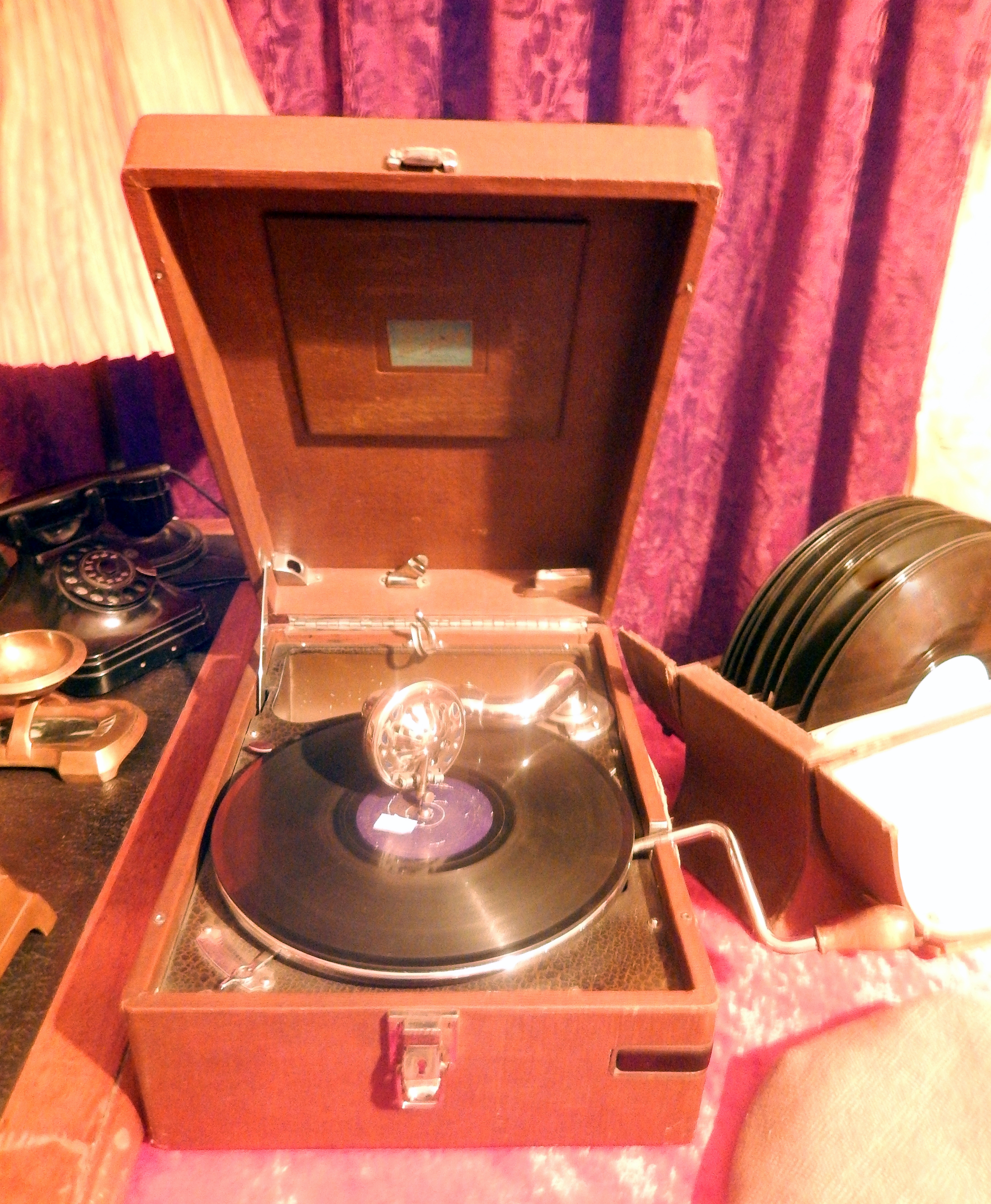
Yeghishe Charents' gramophone

The Yeghishe Charents House Museum is a research centre studying Charents's life, and literary, cultural and social-political activities. The museum exhibits the relics of Charents, including his personal belongings, manuscripts, documents, books, photos, and other specimens. All bear evidence in support of the poet's great talent for not only poetry, but also translation and publishing.

The most valuable part of the museum is the Memorial House, where everything is arranged as it was in Charents's lifetime. The house is furnished in a combination of Western and Eastern tastes: the grand piano "Becker", the typewriter, the furniture of red wood, the carpets inherited from his father, the ottoman, the Chinese panels, the collection of ivory and bronze statues of Buddha, the reproductions of Leonardo da Vinci, Fra Angelico, and so on.

=== Library ===
Charents's personal library forms a part of the Memorial House. According to the poet's daughter Arpenik, his library consisted of 6000 books in the 1930s. After his arrest during Joseph Stalin's Great Purge, a large number of books were destroyed. Now there are 1452 books in the library, including many valuable works in different languages on different subjects, such as arts and religion.

Charents's library included a unique collection of books by many Armenian writers, including Khorenatsi, Buzand, Narekatsi, Kuchak, Shnorhali, Sayat-Nova, Leo, Tumanyan, Terian, Isahakyan, and Metsarents. Having deeply studied Ancient Greek, European and Russian literatures, as well as old Oriental art and literature, the poet enriched his collection with Aurelius, Proust, Asvaghosha, Pirandello, Spengler, Tagore and others. Among these books, the 25 volumes of the "Starie Godi" – a Russian periodical published from 1907 to 1916 – are of particular value.

Many books in the library are autographed. In the margins there are personal notes taken by Charents. There are also books that other writers presented to Charents, including Avetik Isahakyan, Hamlik Toumanian, Garegin Bess, Khachik Dashtents and others. Many books have been brought from Tbilisi (Tiflis), Moscow, Saint Petersburg, and Volgograd (Tsaritsyn).

The museum holds exhibitions, literary-musical gatherings, lectures, concerts, meetings, presentations, and days of poetry reading.
