= Charents Arch =

Cultural heritage monument of Armenia

Coordinates: 40°10′25″N 44°38′12″E

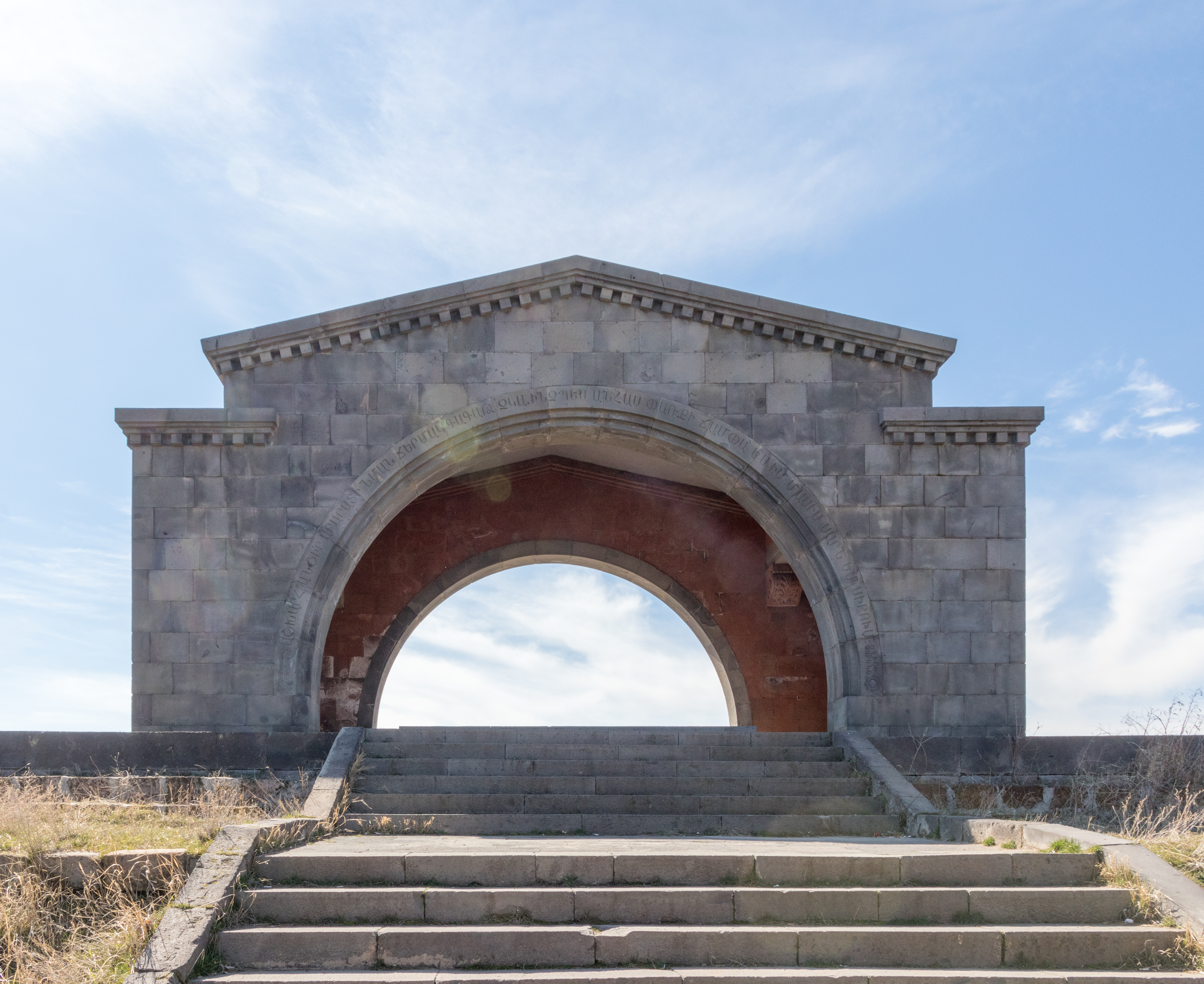
The front of Charents' Arch

Charents' Arch, also known as Arch of Charents or Arch of Ararat (Armenian: Չարենցի կամար) is a monument and tourist attraction erected in 1957 and dedicated to the Armenian poet Yeghishe Charents. The monument is located 1500 m high in the village of Voghjaberd in the Kotayk Province of Armenia.

== Design ==
The person who created the arch was Rafayel Israyelian. He decided to make the arch out of basalt for the exterior and the native orange tuff for the interior. The monument was also made in a rectangular shape with its dimensions being 5.5 x 10 m and a height of 5 m. The arch itself also has a radius of 3.5 m.

The arch has a quote from Charents poem named "I Love My Sweet Armenia's..." engraved in it, which says:

"There is no summit as snow-white as that of lofty Ararat;

Like an inaccessible path to glory, I love my Mount Masis!"

== History ==
The place where the arch was built was known to be one of Charents favourite places. It was at a point where people thought that he had been shot and buried at this location. The idea of the arch came to Israelyan as he was visiting the Garni-Geghard road, when he went and climbed the hill and was so surprised of the view that he decided to build the arch there. The arch was completed and erected in 1957.

== Significance ==
The monument is significant due to its view of places important to Armenia, with the main ones being Mount Ararat and Yerevan.

The monument also has significance in being one of if not the first monument to someone who was a victim of the Great Purge as Charents had his works banned, was arrested by the Armenian communist government and later died imprisoned in 1937.

== Gallery ==
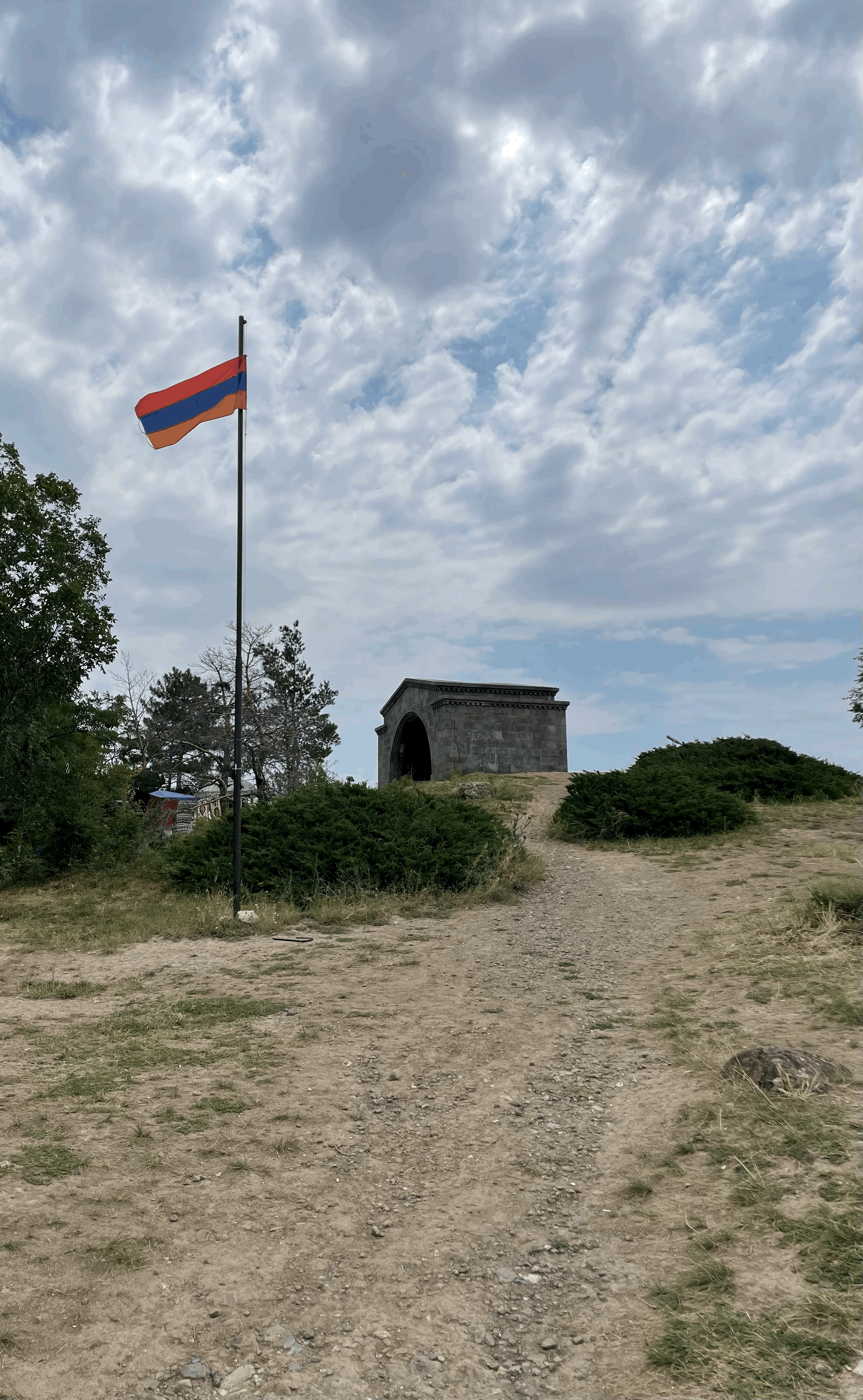

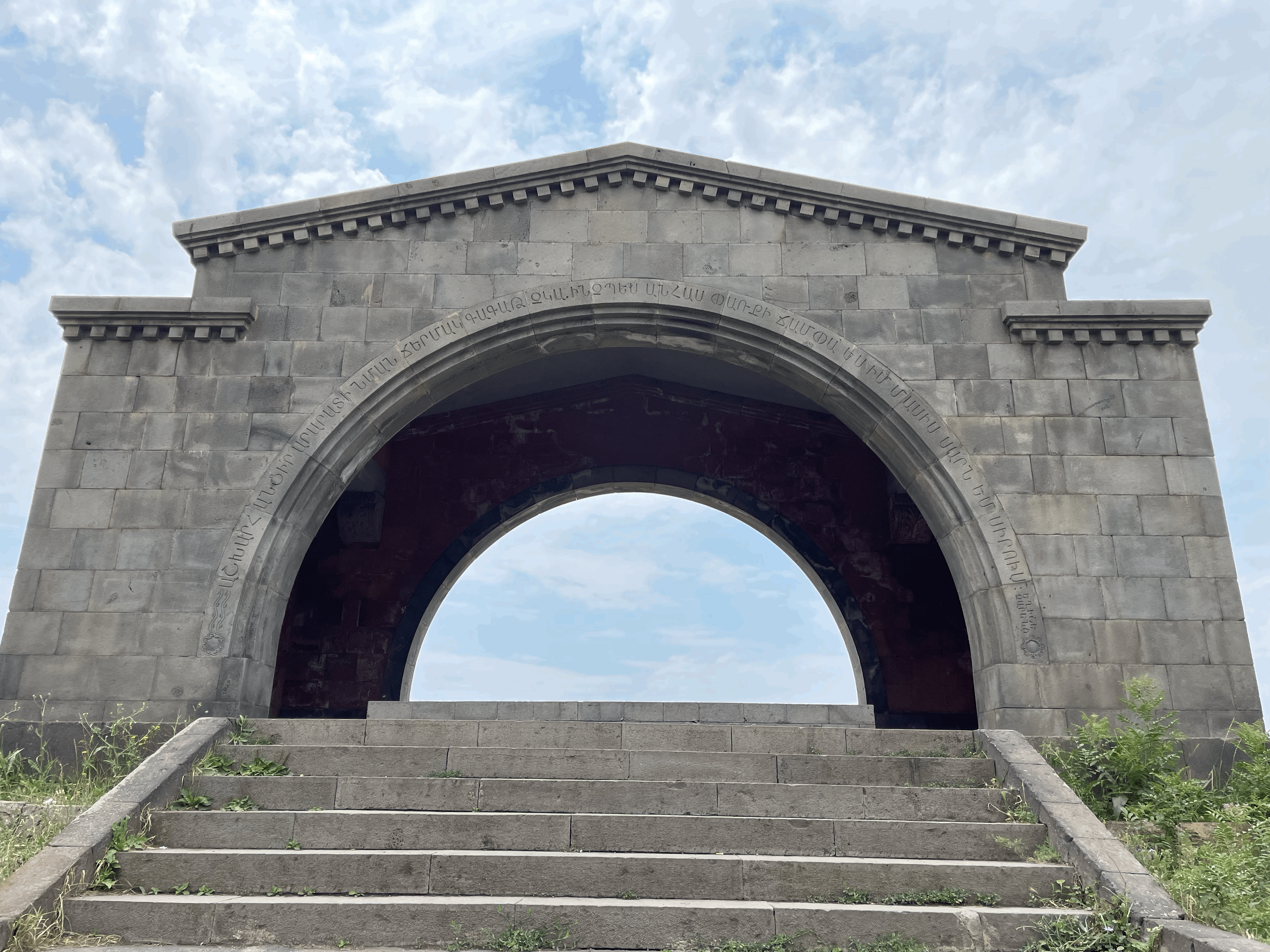

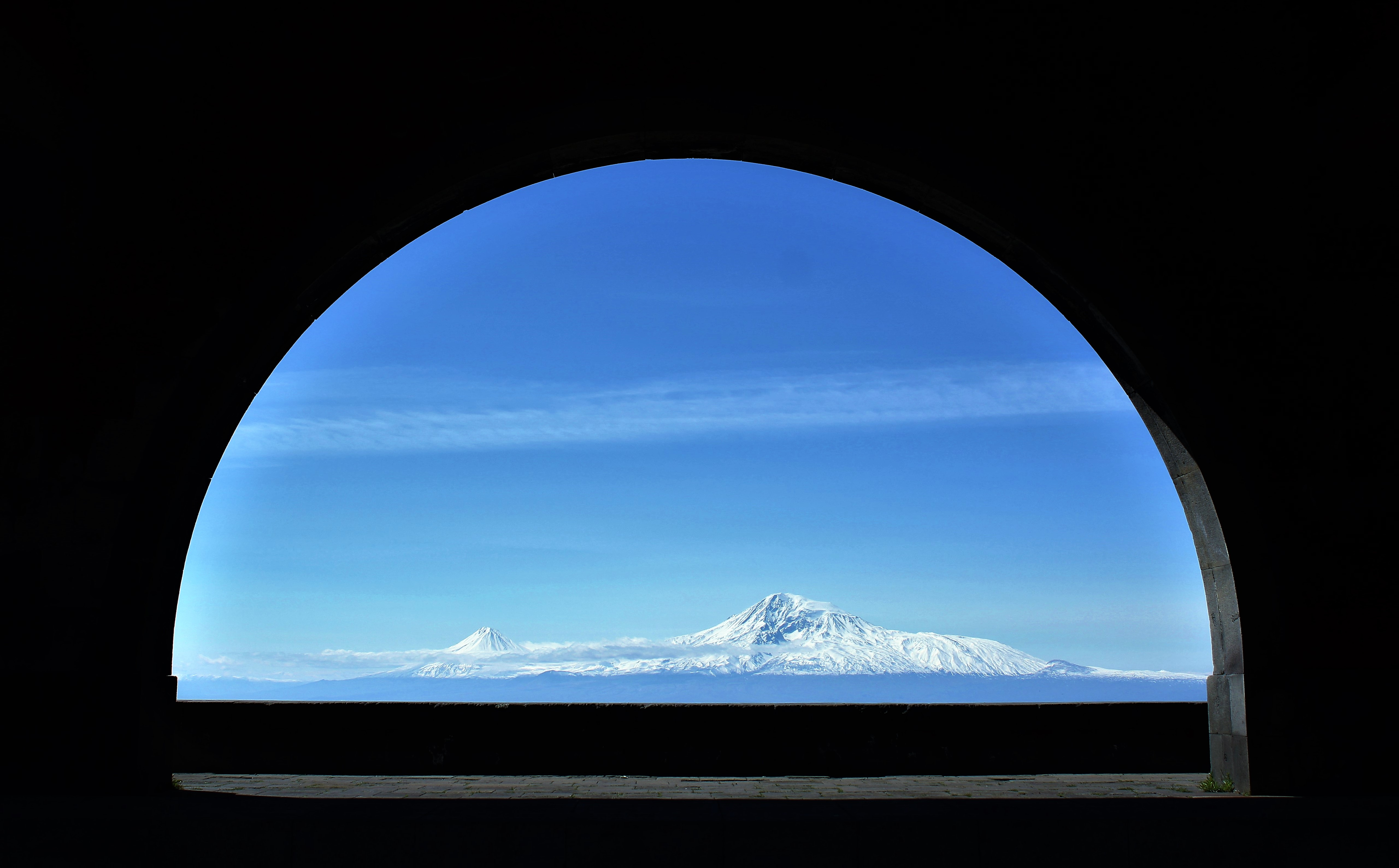
The view of Mt Ararat from the arch

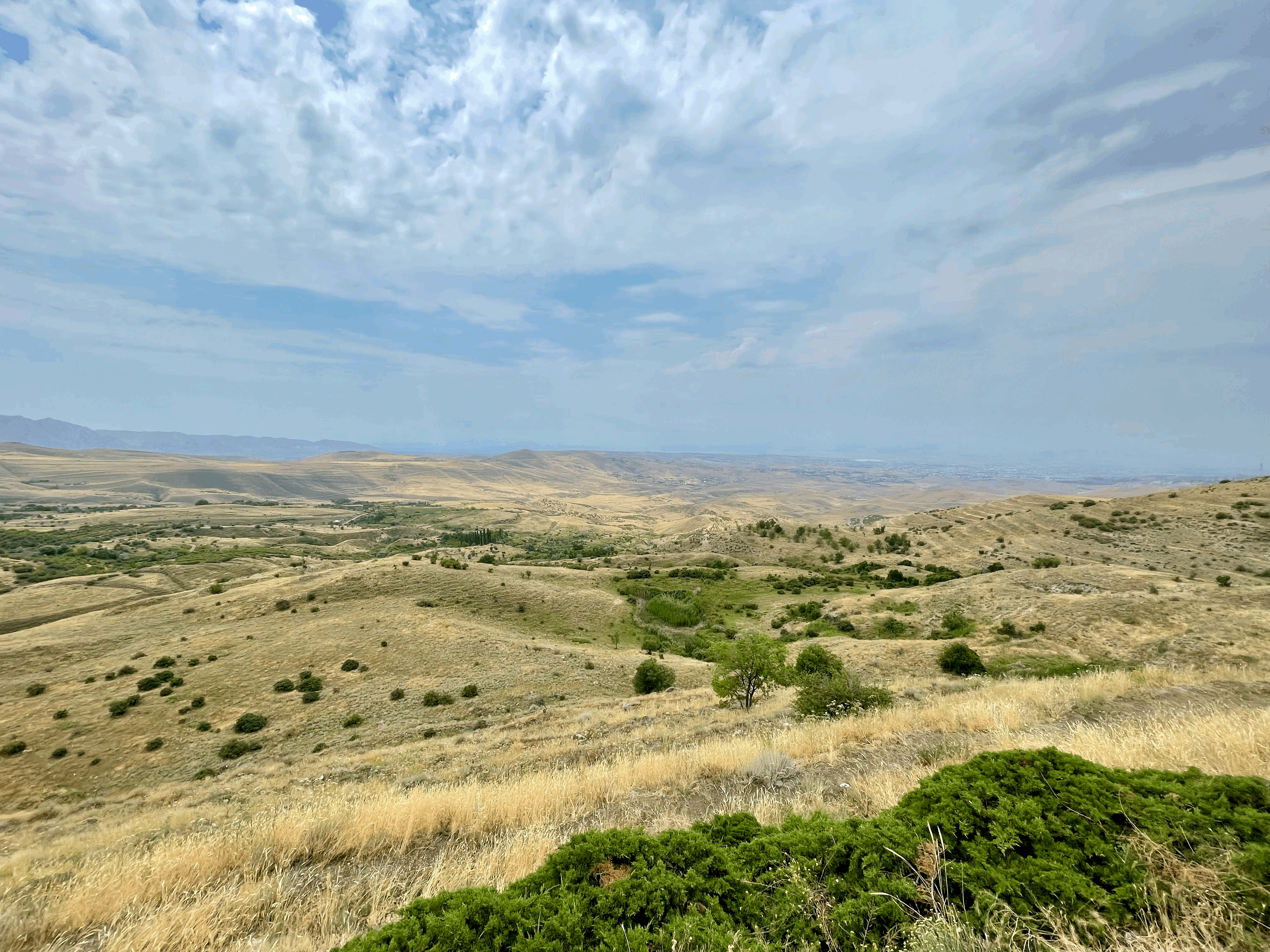

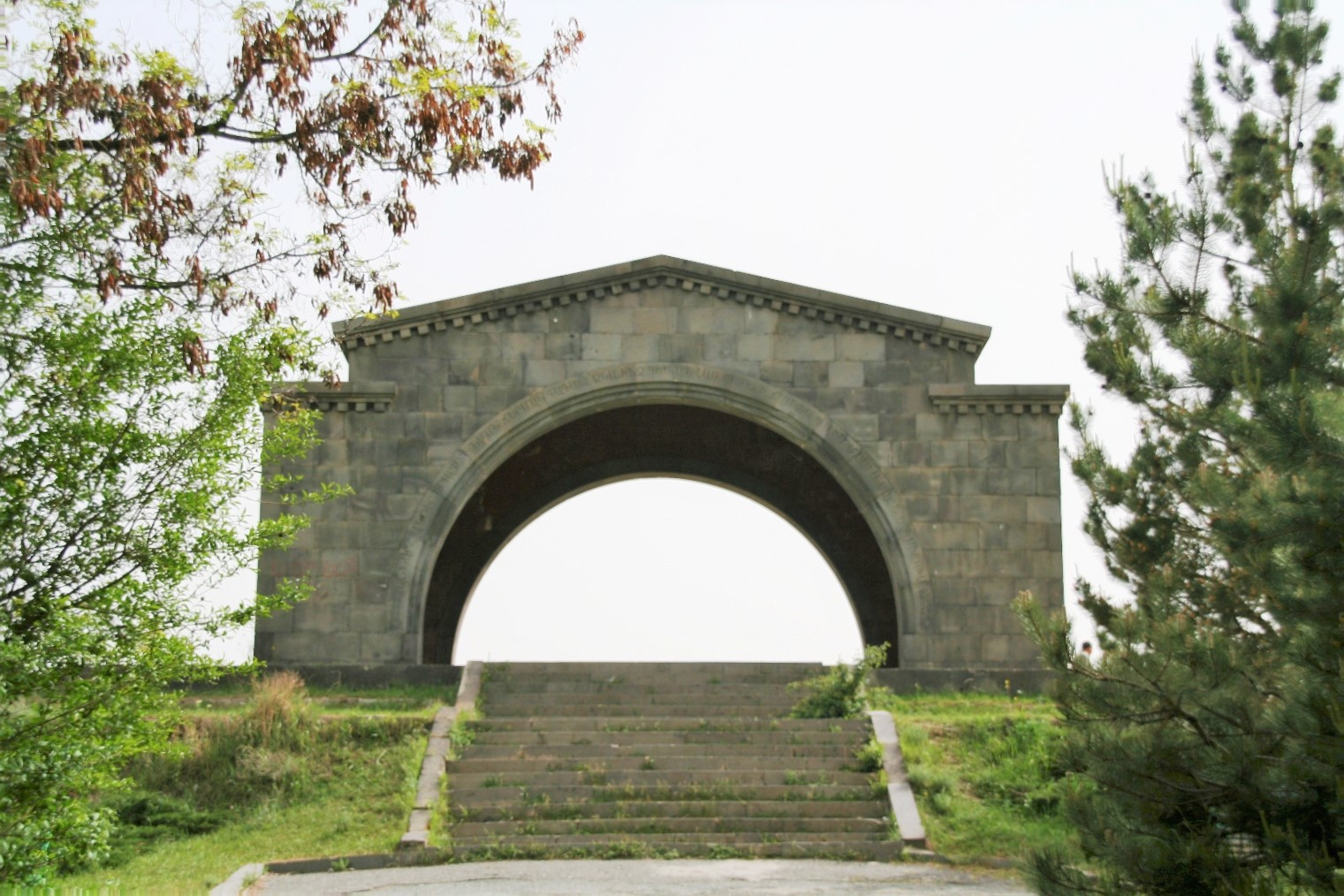

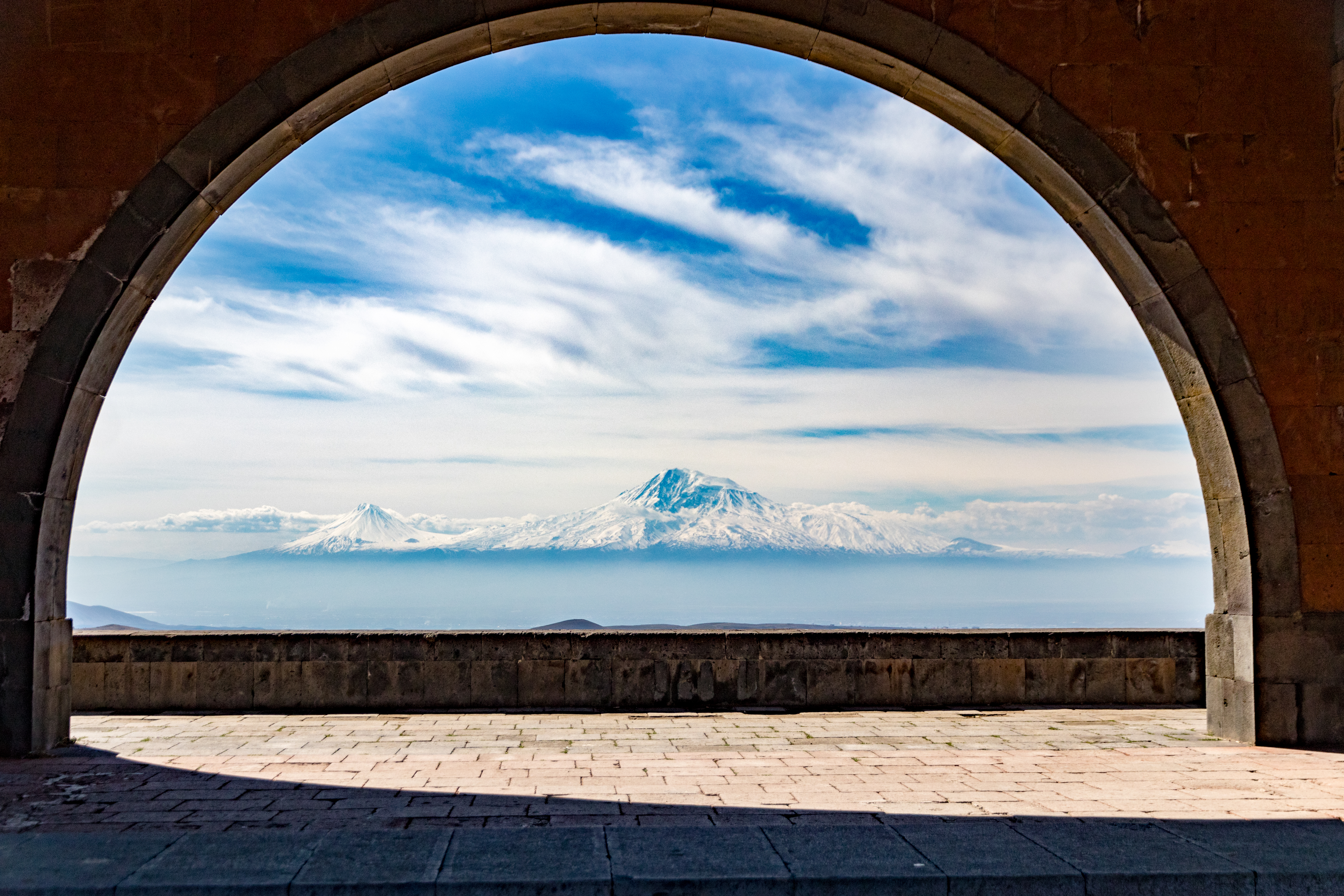

== See also ==
- Temple of Garni
- Sardarapat Memorial
- Armenian architecture
