= Suren Aghababyan =

Suren Bardughi Aghababyan (Armenian: Սուրեն Բարդուղի Աղաբաբյան, born 22 January 1922, Karakilisa, Erivan Governorate, Russian Empire – died 19 March 1986, Yerevan, Armenian SSR, Soviet Union) was a Soviet Armenian literary critic and Doctor of Philology.

He was an author of many works including biographies of Yeghishe Charents and Axel Bakunts, and the History of Soviet Armenian Literature (two volumes, 1961–65, published in Russian in 1966).
