= Ghazar =

Ghazar is an Armenian given name. Notable people with the name include:

- Ghazar Parpetsi, 5th to 6th century Armenian chronicler and historian
- Ghazar Artsatagortsian, Russian Navy Admiral of Armenian descent

== See also ==
- Ghazaros
- Gazar
