= Salpi Ghazarian =

Salpi Haroutinian Ghazarian (Armenian: Սալբի Ղազարյան) (born Aleppo, Syria), is the former director of the University of Southern California's Institute of Armenian Studies.

== Biography ==
Salpi Ghazarian joined the USC Institute of Armenian Studies in 2014 to lead an institute dedicated to advancing contemporary Armenian studies in a broad, multidisciplinary, global framework. She assumed the position after returning to Los Angeles from Yerevan, Armenia, where she lived for 15 years and during that time co-founded and directed the Civilitas Foundation, a think tank and an advocacy organization where she was managing a team of 60 professional and support staff. Salpi's previous posts include Special Assistant to the Foreign Minister of Armenia, Vartan Oskanian, during the formative years of the newly independent country's foreign policy with a special focus on relations with the US, the EU and the cooperation with the UN. She was also the head of research for the Massachusetts-based Zoryan Institute which focused on publication of contemporary post-Genocide and Armenian Diaspora topics. For close to three decades Salpi has worked as an educator, researcher, language instructor and has been a librarian for the Los Angeles County Public Library and then for the Armenian collection at the UCLA library. Throughout her career she has been an editor to various Armenian publications, most importantly as the editor and later as the publisher of the Armenian International Magazine. She is a USC and UCLA Alumna with degrees in arts in History and Library Science.
