= Regina Ghazaryan =

Armenian painter (1915–1999)

Regina Tadevosi Ghazaryan
- Ռեգինա Ղազարյան
- Born: April 17, 1915; Yerevan
- Died: November 6, 1999 (aged 84); Yerevan

Regina Tadevosi Ghazaryan (Armenian: Ռեգինա Թադևոսի Ղազարյան; April 17, 1915 in Yerevan – November 6, 1999 in Yerevan) was an Armenian painter and public figure. Known as a friend and benefactor of Yeghishe Charents, she is credited with saving many of the poet's manuscripts during the regime of Joseph Stalin.

== Biography ==
Ghazaryan was born in a family of an Armenian genocide survivor from Van and a noble mother from Yerevan (Khorasanyans). She met the poet Yeghishe Charents in 1930. At the age of fifteen, Ghazaryan, an orphan, had "in some sort been adopted by Charents as both an intimate friend and a witness to his solitary hours".

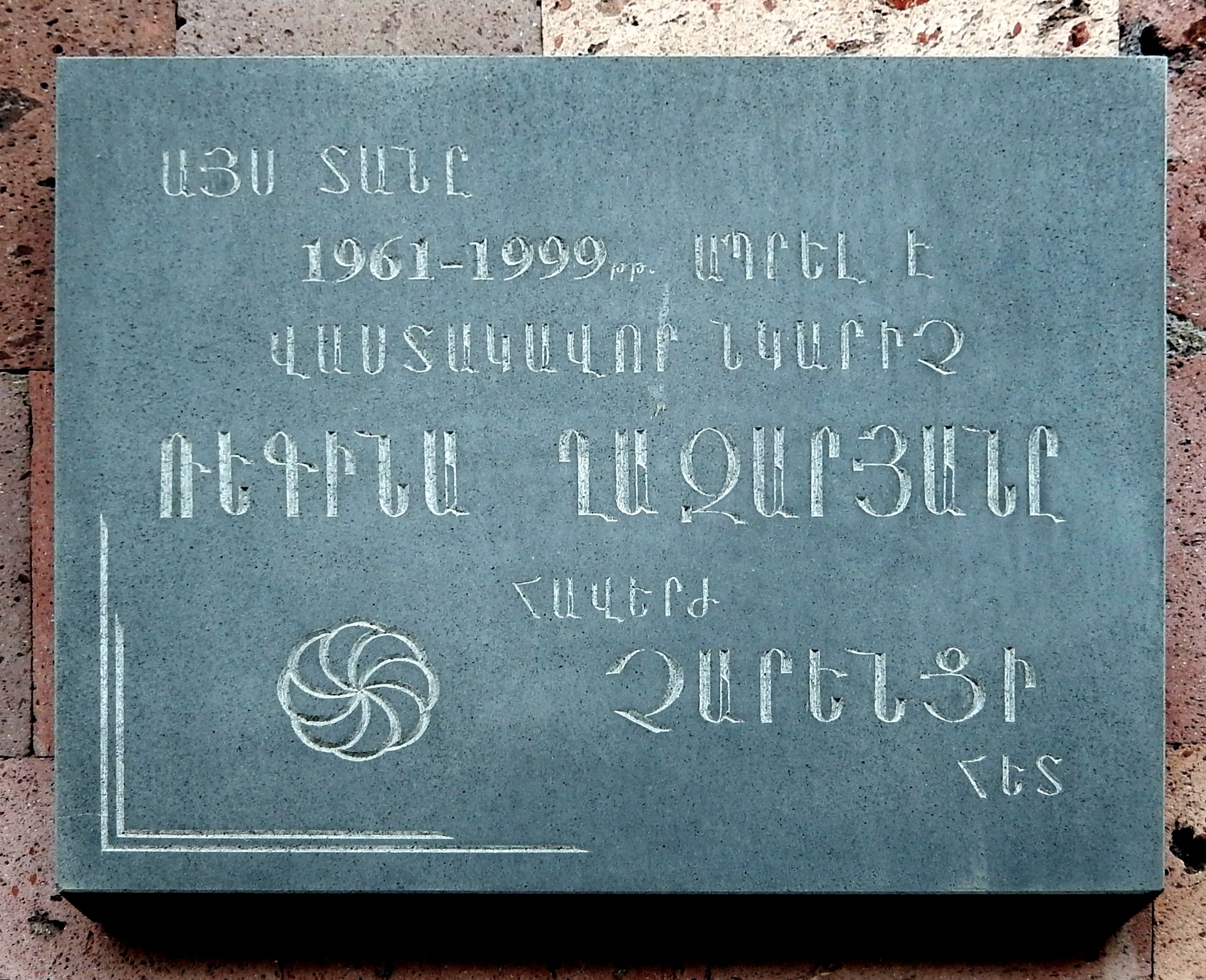
Regina Ghazaryan's plaque on Baghramyan Avenue, Yerevan

In 1937, from the prison cell Charents had secretly informed his wife Izabella that she should trust all of his writings only to a family friend, Ghazaryan, and that she will save them from being destroyed. After Charents's death Ghazaryan hid and preserved many of his manuscripts (7000 lines in total including "Requiem to Komitas", "The Nameless", "Songs of Autumn" and "Navzike") in the garden. As a military pilot she participated in World War II. She finished Yerevan Fine Arts Institute in 1951.

On 11 March 1954, Anastas Mikoyan called for the rehabilitation of Charents in a speech in Yerevan. The speech inspired Ghazaryan to remove Charents's manuscripts from hiding. She granted them to the Charents Museum of Literature and Arts.

In 2009 a memorial plaque was inaugurated on the house at Baghramyan St. 33a, Yerevan where Ghazaryan lived and worked from 1961 to 1999.

Ghazaryan's paintings are exhibited in various museums of Armenia, including the National Gallery of Armenia. She was a member of the Painters' Union of Armenia.

== Awards ==
- Honorary citizen of Yerevan (1995)
- Renowned painter of Armenia (1985)

== Works ==
- Charents (1966)
- Aghavnadzor (1965)
- Komitas (1969)
- Aspetakan (1975)
- Paruyr Sevak
- Khaghagh tiezerk

== Personal exhibitions ==
- Yerevan (1967, 1987, 1988)
- Gyumri (1967)
- Ejmiatsin (1967)

== Books ==
- Charentsyan Nshkharner by Regina Ghazaryan (1998)

== Publications ==
- Regina Ghazaryan, "Reminiscences about Charents" [Husher Charentsi masin], Garun. Erevan, #1. 1987, pp. 67–75
