= Manuk Ghazaryan =

Armenian musician (born 1983)

- Born: October 23, 1983 (age 42); Armenia
- Genres: Composer, performer
- Occupation: Musician

Manuk Ghazaryan (Armenian: Մանուկ Ղազարյան; born October 23, 1983) is an Armenian jazz pianist, composer, keyboard player.

== Biography ==
Manuk Ghazaryan began his concert activity in 2005 and four years later, in 2009, his Manuk Ghazaryan Band became the winner of the Bucharest Jazz Competition in Romania. Since 2011, the team has been working in Moscow, in 2013 it became a finalist of the competition for young performers "Estate Jazz 2013".

The group consists exclusively of musicians of the first row, participants in festivals in France, Germany, the Netherlands, the Caucasus-Jazz Festival, as well as concerts in Nicosia (Cyprus), Beirut (Lebanon), etc.

Ghazaryan worked on Sarik Andreasyan's 2020 film Goodbye America.

Manuk Ghazaryan wrote the music for the film "Robo".

Also, the musician composed compositions for the series "Chikatilo" in 2021.

== Discography ==
Year	Album	Publisher
2010	Armenian Jazz 70 Art Voices	Sharm holding
