= USC Institute of Armenian Studies =

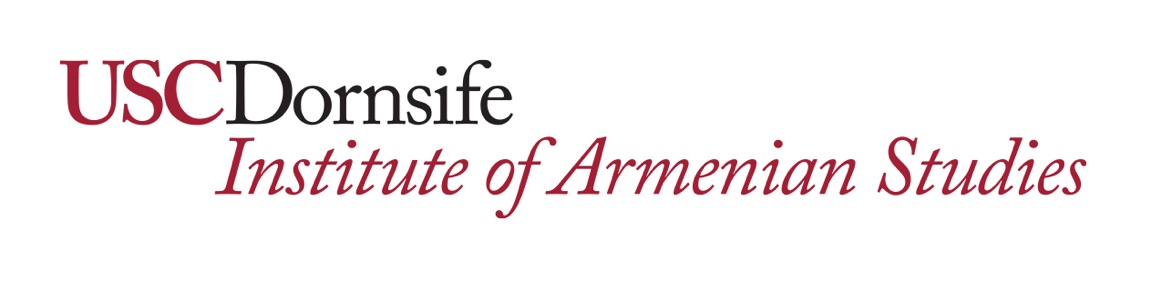

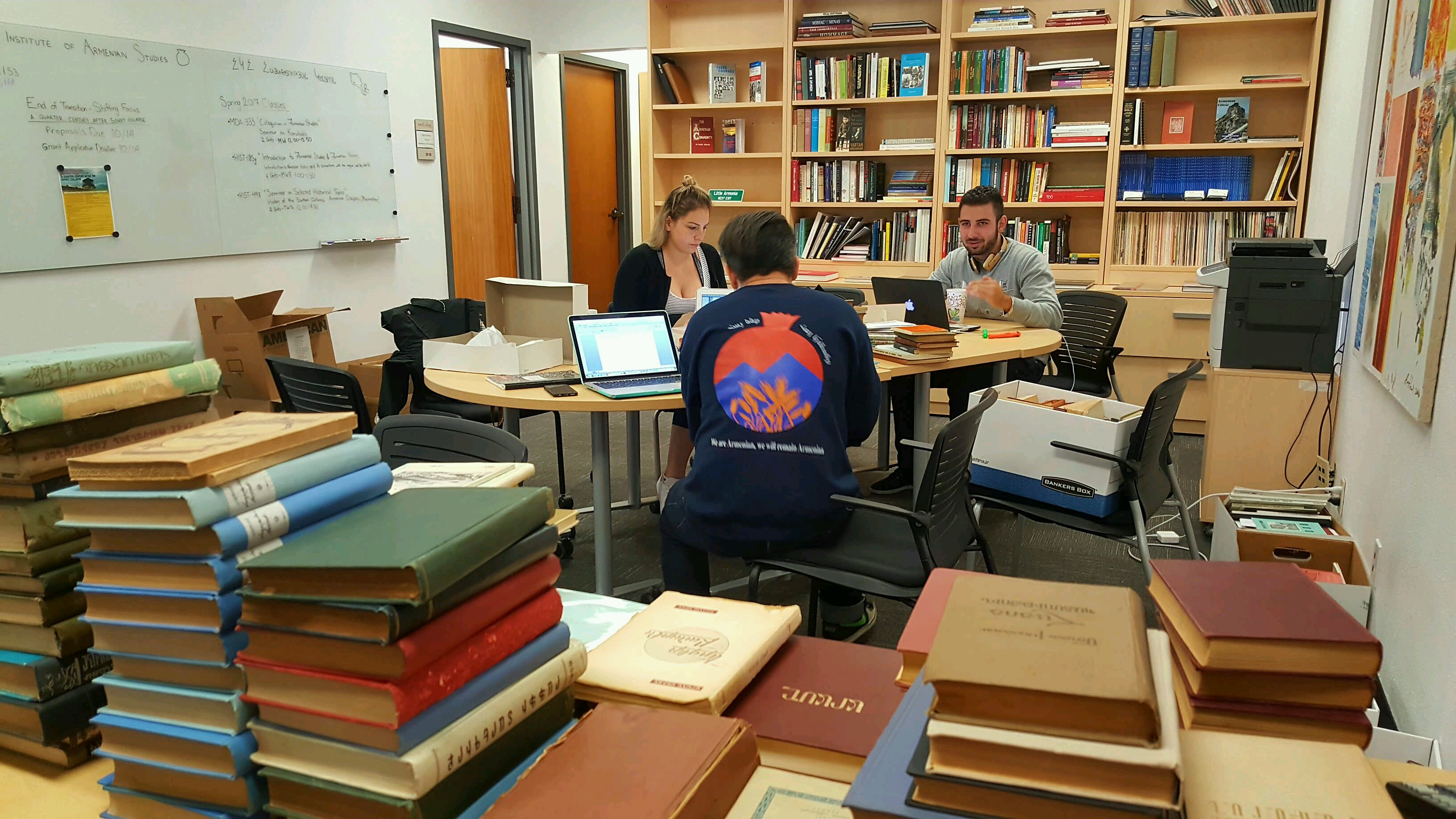
- Formation: 2005
- Type: Research institute
- Official language: English
- Director: Dr. Shushan Karapetian
- Associate director: Silva Sevlian
- Associate director: Syuzanna Petrosyan
- Website: armenian.usc.edu

The USC Institute of Armenian Studies is an educational center dedicated to the study of modern Armenia, based at the University of Southern California in Los Angeles. It operates as a branch of the university's Dana and David Dornsife College of Letters, Arts, and Sciences. The current director of the institute is Salpi Ghazarian, who assumed the position in 2014.

== History ==
The Institute was established in 2005.

Its offices were recently relocated to the Von Kleinsmid Center, at the heart of the University Park Campus.

== See also ==
- Armenian Studies
