= Manvel Ghazaryan =

Armenian politician

Member of the National Assembly of Armenia
- In office 1999–2007

Personal details
- Born: 2 May 1961 (age 65) Ararat Province, Armenian SSR, Soviet Union
- Party: Independent
- Education: Armenian State University of Economics

Manvel Ghazaryan (born 2 May 1961) is an Armenian politician. He attended the Armenian State University of Economics. Ghazaryan served as an independent member of the National Assembly of Armenia from 1999 to 2007.
