= Armenian dialects =

Overview of dialects of Armenian

The Armenian language has two standardized forms: Western Armenian and Eastern Armenian. Before the Armenian genocide and other significant demographic changes that affected the Armenians, several dozen Armenian dialects existed in the areas historically populated by them.

== Classification by Hrachia Acharian ==
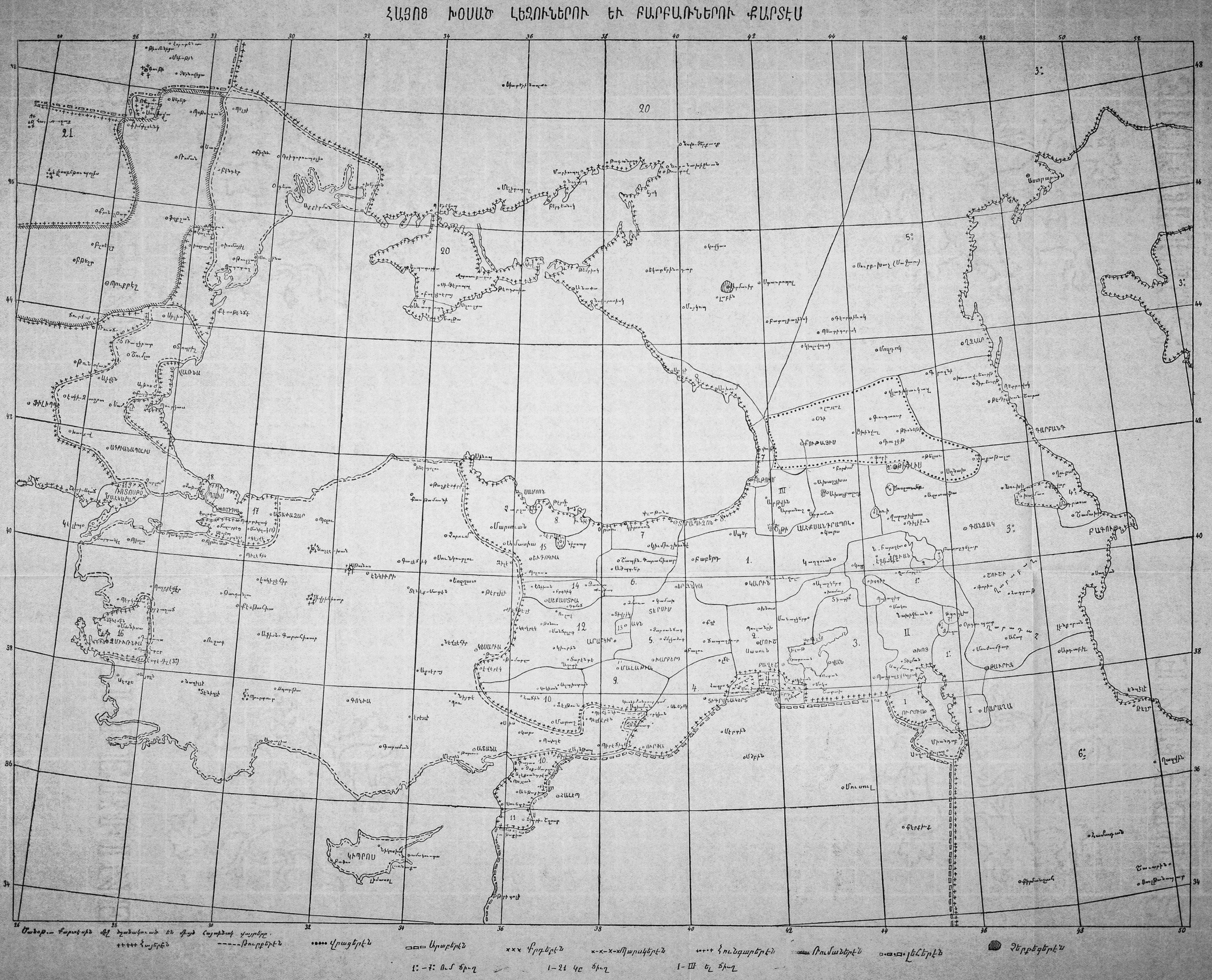
A map of Armenian dialects from Acharian's 1911 book.

Classification des dialectes arméniens (Classification of Armenian dialects) is a 1909 book by the Armenian linguist Hrachia Acharian, published in Paris. It is Acharian's translation into French of his original work Hay Barbaṙagitutʿiwn ("Armenian Dialectology") that was later published as a book in 1911 in Moscow and New Nakhichevan. The French translation lacks dialectal examples. An English translation was published in 2024.

Acharian surveyed the Armenian dialects in what is now Turkey, Armenia, Georgia, Iran, Azerbaijan and other countries settled by Armenians.

Unlike the traditional division of Armenian into two dialect groups (Western Armenian and Eastern Armenian), he divided Armenian into three main dialect groups based on the present and imperfect indicative particles that were used. He called as the -owm (-ում) dialects, -gë (-կը) dialects, and -el (-ել) dialects.

After the Armenian genocide, linguists Gevorg Jahukyan, Jos Weitenberg, Bert Vaux and Hrach Martirosyan have extended the understanding of Armenian dialects.

=== Map ===
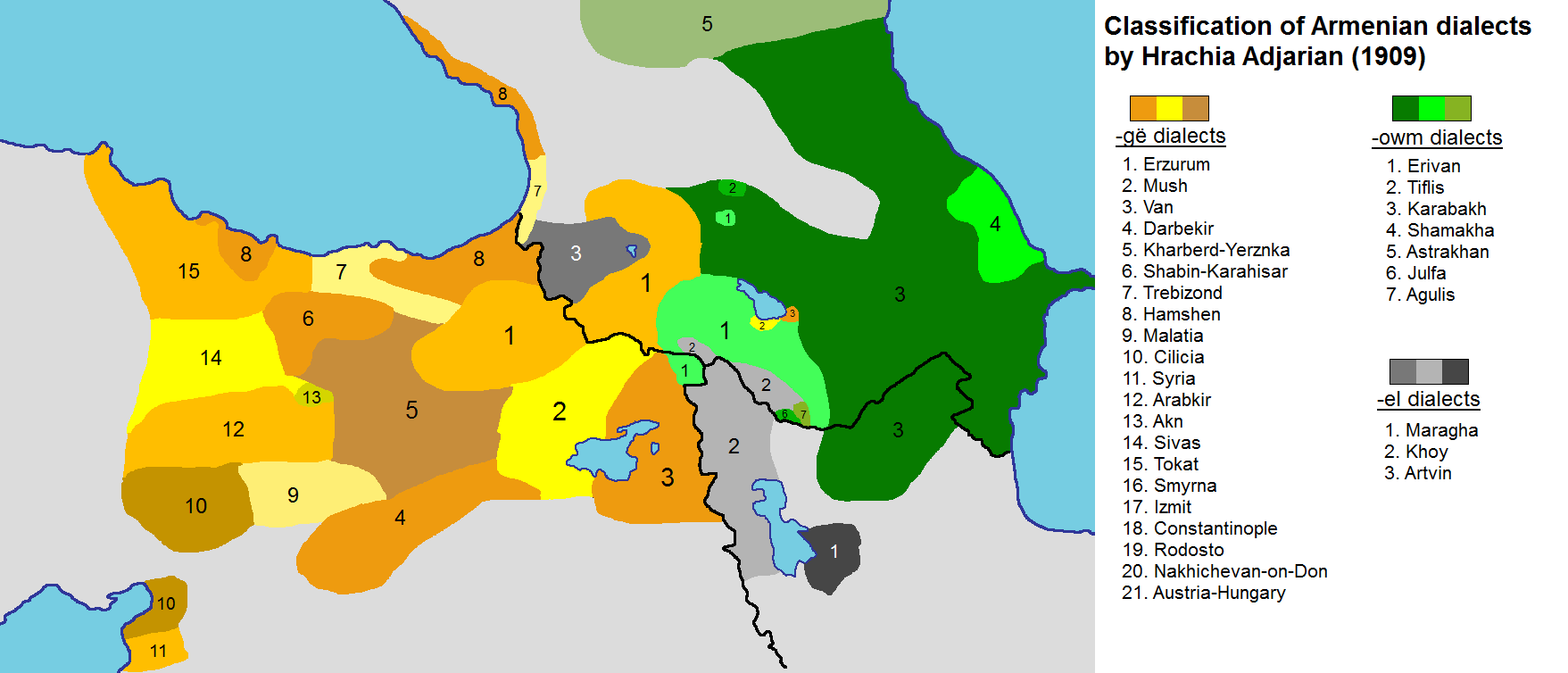
Map of Armenian dialects in the early 20th century: -owm dialects, roughly corresponding to Eastern Armenian. -el dialects. -gë dialects, roughly corresponding to Western Armenian.

=== -owm dialects ===
	Dialect	Areas spoken (country and city names as of 1909)
1	Yerevan	Russian Empire: Erivan, Novo-Bayazet, Ordubad, Shamshadin, Shulaver, Havlabar quarter (Tiflis), Lori, Astabad; Ottoman Empire: Bayazid, Kulp; Qajar Persia: Gala, quarter of Tabriz
1.1	Bayazid	Ottoman Empire: Bayazid; Russian Empire: Novo-Bayazet
1.2	Astabad	Russian Empire: Astabad
1.3	Tabriz	Qajar Persia: Gala, quarter of Tabriz
2	Tiflis	Russian Empire: Tiflis (except Havlabar quarter)
3	Artsakh (Karabakh) (Note: Subdialects: Kazak, Karadagh, Elisabethpol (Gandzak))	Russian Empire: Shusha, Elisabethpol (Gandzak), Nukha, Baku, Derbent, Ağstafa, Dilijan, Karakilis, Kazak, Bolnis-Khachini, Jebrayil, Goris; Qajar Persia: Karadagh, Mujumbar; Lilava quarter of Tabriz; Ottoman Empire: Burdur, Ödemiş villages near Izmir
4	Shamakha	Russian Empire: Shamakhi, Kuba and nearby villages, Baku (partially), Ermenikend
5	Astrakhan	Russian Empire: Astrakhan, North Caucasus; Qajar Persia: Tabriz
6	Julfa	Russian Empire: Julfa; Qajar Persia: Isfahan (New Julfa quarter), Shiraz, Hamadan, Bushehr, Tehran, Qazvin, Rasht, Bandar-e Anzali
7	Agulis	Russian Empire: Agulis, Tsghna, Handamej, Tanakert, Ramis, Dasht, Kaghaki
7.1	Tsghna	Russian Empire: Tsghna

=== -el dialects ===
-el dialects
	Dialect	Areas spoken (country and city names as of 1909)
1	Maragha	Qajar Persia: Maragha and surrounding villages
2	Khoy	Qajar Persia: Khoy, Salmas, Maku, Urmia; Russian Empire: Igdir, Nakhichevan; Zangezur settlements: Kori, Alighuli, Mughanjugh, Karashen, Alilu, Angeghakot, Ghushchi-Tazakend, Tazakend, Uz, Mazra, Balak, Shaghat, Ltsen, Sisian, Nerkin Kilisa
3	Artvin	Russian Empire: Artvin, Ardahan, Artanuj, Olti

=== -gë dialects ===
	Dialect	Areas spoken (country and city names as of 1909)
1	Erzurum	Ottoman Empire: Erzurum, Ispir, Kaghzvan; Russian Empire: Kars, Alexandropol, Akhalkalak, Akhaltskha
2	Mush	Ottoman Empire: Mush, Sasun, Bitlis, Khizan, Khlat, Arjesh, Bulanikh, Manazkert, Khnus, Alashkert; Russian Empire: Aparan; Mets Kznut and surrounding villages; Javakhk (specifically Eshtia, Ujmana, Toria, Martuni)
3	Van (Note: Subdialects: Moks, Norduz, Shatakh, Ozmi)	Ottoman Empire: Van, Diadin, Moks, Bashkale, Shatakh; Russian Empire: Basargechar and surrounding villages
4	Diarbekir	Ottoman Empire: Diarbekir, Lice, Hazro, Hazzo, Khizan, Severek, Urfa (Edesia)
5	Kharberd-Yerznka	Ottoman Empire: Kharpert, Yerznka, Balu, Tchapaghjur, Chmshkatsag, Charsanjak, Kghi, Dersim, Kamakh
6	Shabin-Karahisar	Ottoman Empire: Shabin-Karahisar, Akıncılar
7	Trebizond	Ottoman Empire: Trebizond, Bayburt, Gyumushkhane, Kirasun
8	Hamshen	Ottoman Empire: Hamshen, Ünye, Fatsa, Terme, Çarşamba; Russian Empire: Sukhumi, Sochi, Poti,
9	Malatya	Ottoman Empire: Malatya, Adıyaman
10	Cilicia (Note: Subdialects: Marash)	Ottoman Empire: Hadjin, Zeytun, Marash, Kilis, Alexandretta, Payas, Svedia
11	Syria	Ottoman Empire: Aramo
12	Arabkir	Ottoman Empire: Arabkir, Divrig, Gürün, Darende, villages of Kesaria
12.1	Gürün	Ottoman Empire: Gürün, Darende, villages of Kesaria
13	Akn	Ottoman Empire: Akn and surrounding villages
14	Sivas	Ottoman Empire: Sivas and 45 surrounding villages
15	Tokat	Ottoman Empire: Tokat, Amasia, Marsivan, Ordu, Samsun, Sinop
16	Smyrna	Ottoman Empire: Smyrna, Manisa, Menemen and surrounding villages
17	Izmit	Ottoman Empire: Nicomedia, Adapazar and the following villages: Yalova, Partizak, Geyve, Ortaköy, Sölöz, Benli, İznik, etc.
18	Constantinople	Ottoman Empire: Constantinople
19	Rodosto	Ottoman Empire: Rodosto, Malgara
20	Nakhichevan-on-Don	Russian Empire: Nakhichevan-on-Don, Rostov-on-Don, Stavropol, Yekaterinodar, Yekaterinoslav, Anapa, Maykop, Taganrog, Dneprovskaya, Nogaysk, Novocherkassk, Theodosia, Simferopol, Karasubazar, Bakhchysarai, Eupatoria
21	Austria-Hungary	Russian Empire: Poland; Austria: Bukovina; Hungary

== Tree ==
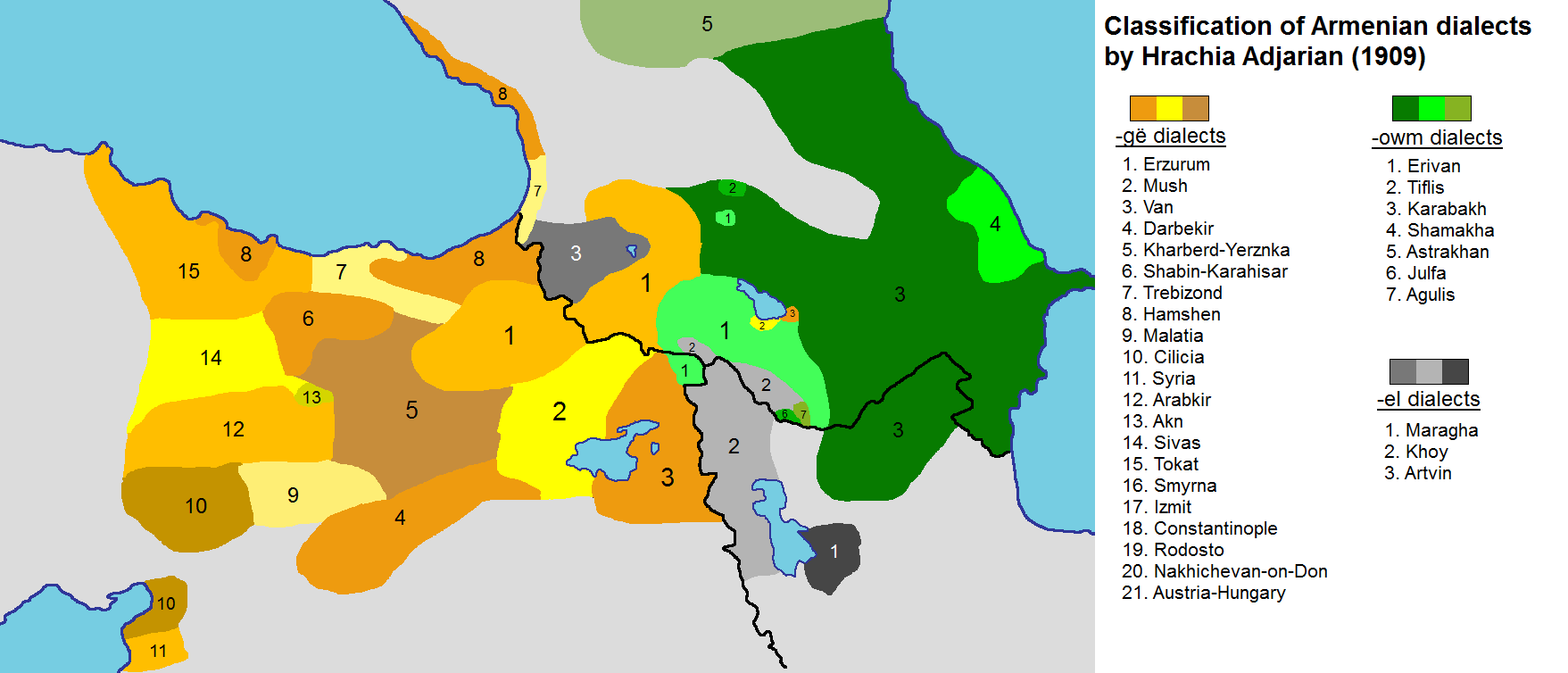
Armenian dialects, according to Adjarian (1909) (before 1st World War and Armenian Genocide). In many regions of the contiguous area shown in the map, Armenian speakers were the majority or a significant minority.

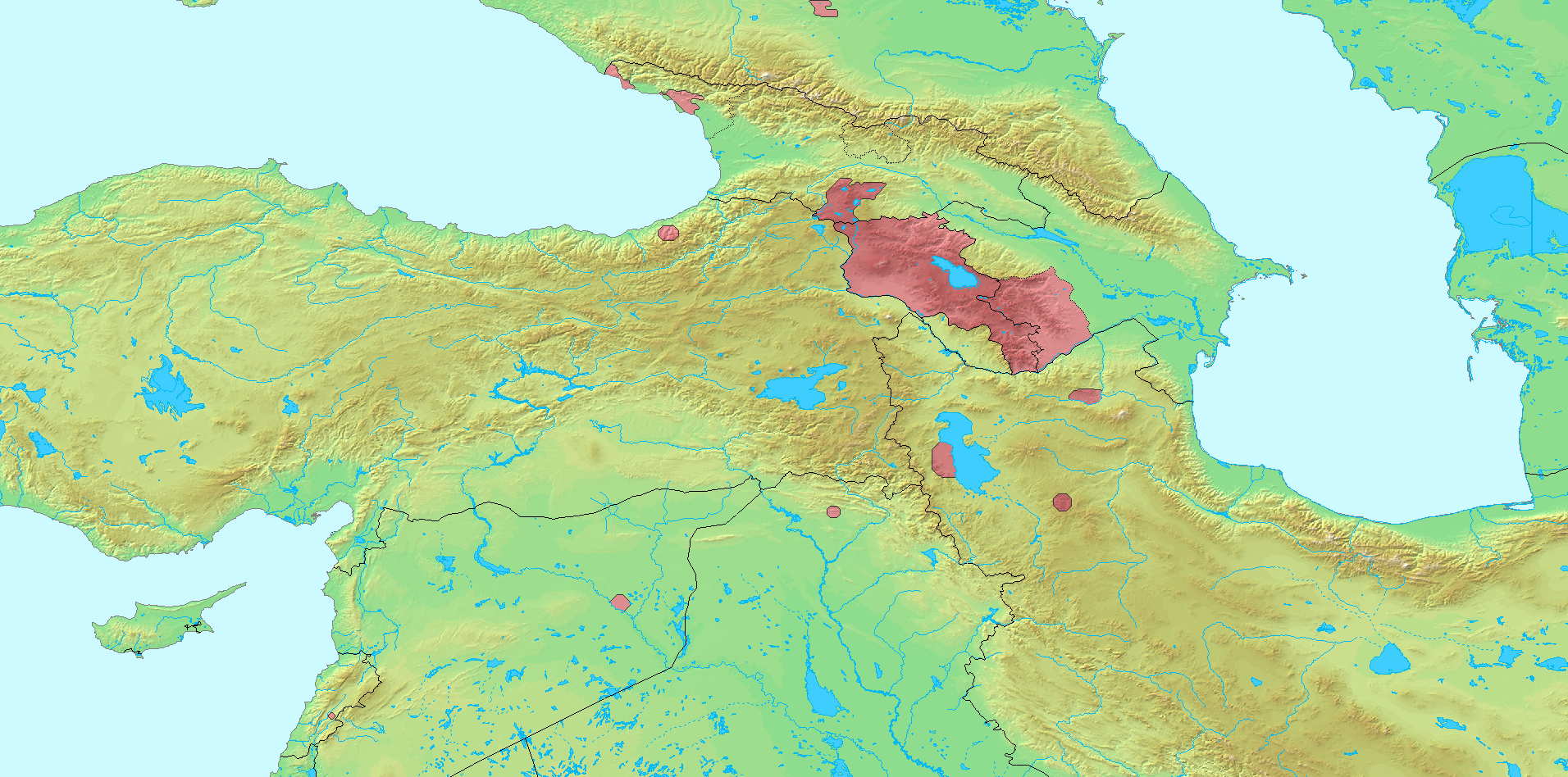
Modern geographical distribution of the Armenian language.

- Proto-Armenian (extinct)
  - Classical Armenian / Old Armenian
    - Liturgical Armenian
    - Middle Armenian / Cilician Armenian
      - Modern Armenian
        - Armenian (Broad Armenian dialect continuum)
          - Armenian Standards
            - Eastern Armenian
            - Western Armenian
          - Armenian dialects
            - Eastern Armenian (dialect continuum)
              - -owm dialects
                - Araratian
                  - Yerevan
                    - Modern Eastern Armenian Standard
                - Jugha / Julfa
                - Zok (could be a distinct armenian language)
                  - Agulis
                  - Meghri
                - Artsakh / Karabagh Armenian
                - Eastern Armenian dialects in the diaspora
                  - Tiflis / Tbilisi Armenian
                  - Shamakha (nearly extinct)
                  - Astrakhan Armenian (extinct)
                  - Iranian Armenian / Persian Armenian
                    - Northwest Iran Armenian
                      - Tabriz Armenian (Tavrezh)
                    - North Iran Armenian
                      - Tehran Armenian
                    - Central Iran Armenian
                      - New Jugha / New Julfa / Isfahan Armenian
              - -el dialects
                - Ardvin / Tayk
                - Nor Shirakan
                  - Khoy
                  - Maragha
            - Western Armenian (dialect continuum)
              - -gë dialects
                - Karin / Erzurum
                - Turuberan
                  - Mush / Taron
                    - Gavar
                - Van / Vaspurakan
                  - Torfavan
                - Tigranakert / Aghdznik (Arzanene) (nearly extinct)
                - Kharpert–Yerznka (nearly extinct)
                - Shabin–Karahisar
                - Trapizon / Trabzon Armenian (nearly extinct)
                - Malatia (extinct)
                  - Adiyaman
                - Cilician Armenian (nearly extinct)
                - Sueidia / Syrian Armenian
                  - Vakıflı
                  - Kessab
                  - Latakia
                  - Jisr al-Shughur
                  - Anjar
                - Arabkir (nearly extinct)
                - Akn (nearly extinct)
                - Sebastia / Sivas Armenian (nearly extinct)
                - Tokat (nearly extinct)
                - Western Armenian dialects in the diaspora
                  - West Anatolia diaspora
                    - Nicomedia / Izmit Armenian
                    - Constantinople / Istanbul Armenian (nearly extinct)
                    - Rodosto / Tekirdağ Armenian (extinct)
                    - Smyrna / Izmir Armenian
                  - Black Sea diaspora
                    - Crimean Armenian
                      - Nor Nakhichevan / Nakhichevan-on-Don / New Nakhichevan / Don Armenian
                  - Levant diaspora
                    - Kaghakatsi / Jerusalem Armenian (Armenian Quarter)
                  - European diaspora
                    - Austria-Hungary (extinct)
                  - North American diaspora
                  - South American diaspora
                  - Australian diaspora
                - Homshetsi (could be a distinct archaic armenian language)

== Sources ==
- Adjarian, Hrachia (1909). Classification des dialectes arméniens [Classification of Armenian dialects] (PDF) (in French). Paris: Librairie Honore Champion.
- Dolatian, Hossep (2024). Adjarian's Armenian dialectology (1911): Translation and commentary (PDF). Berlin: Language Science Press. ISBN 978-3-96110-489-5.
