= Karin dialect =

Western Armenian dialect

Karin
- Erzurum, Erzerum
- Կարնոյ բարբառ, Karno barbař
- Native to: Turkey
- Region: Erzurum and surrounding villages
- Ethnicity: Armenians
- Language family: Indo-European: Armenian; Western; Karin
- Writing system: Armenian alphabet

Language codes
- ISO 639-3: (included in Western Armenian [hyw])
- Glottolog: kari1302
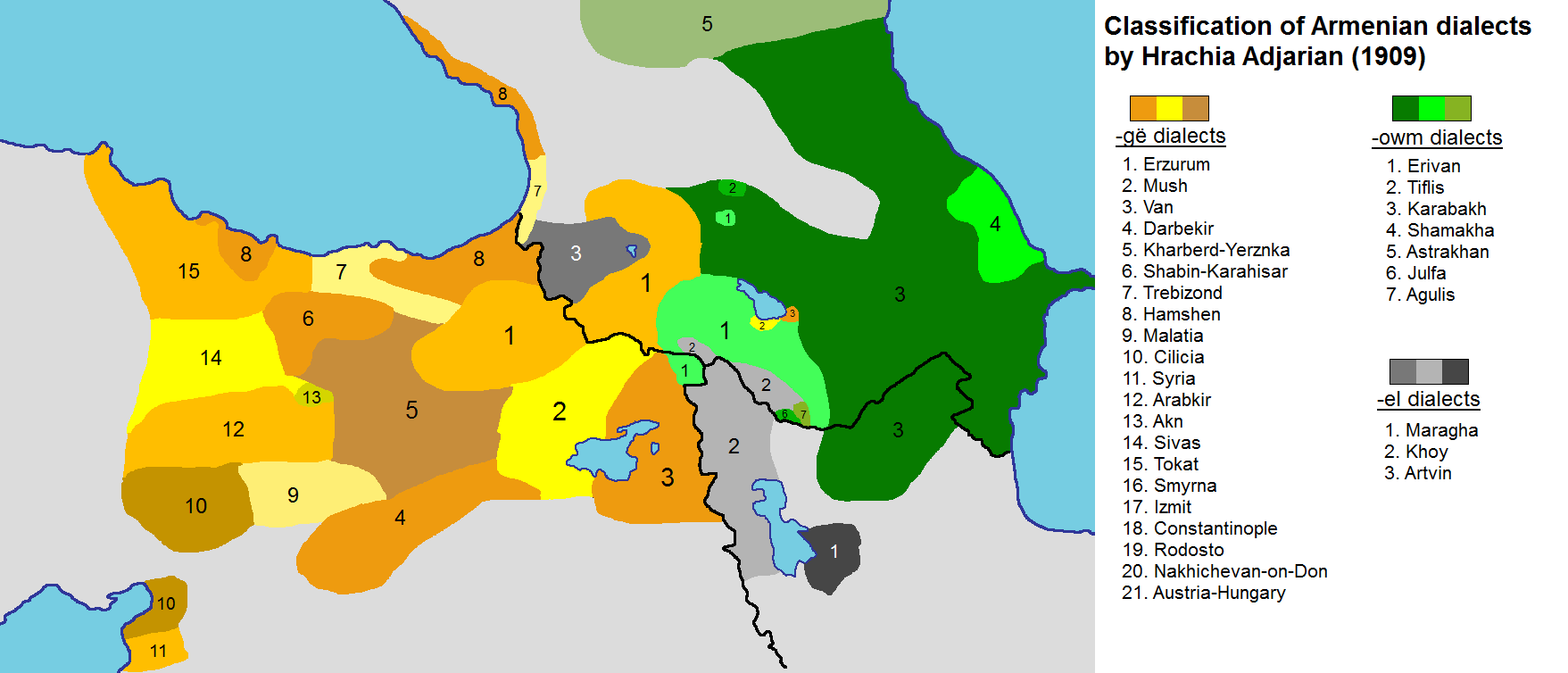
- Erzurum

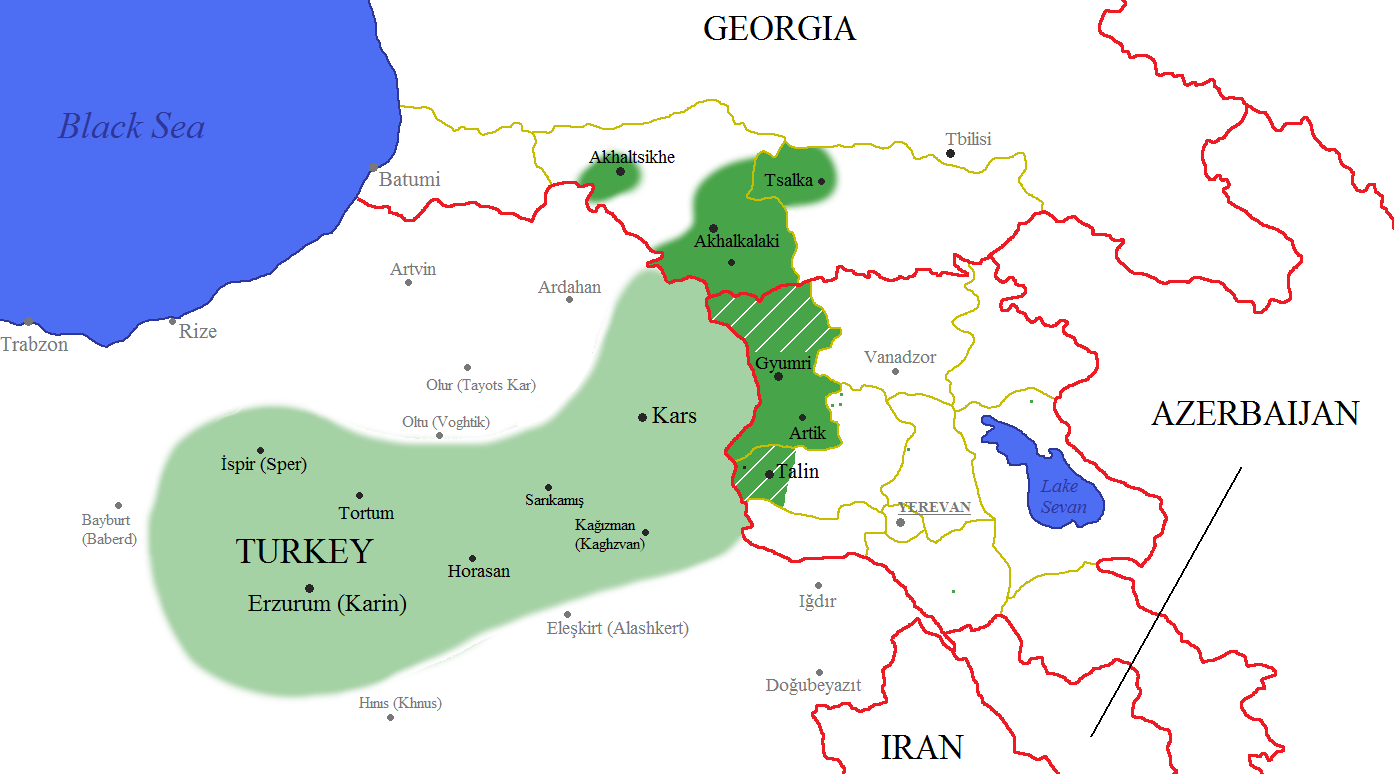
- The spread of the Karin dialect today before 1915–1920 not all areas where the Karin dialect was/is spoken had/have Armenian majority

The Karin dialect (Armenian: Կարնոյ բարբառ, Karno barbař) is a Western Armenian dialect originally spoken in and around the city of Erzurum (called Karin by Armenians), now located in eastern Turkey.

Before World War I, the Karin dialect was spoken by the local Armenian populations in much of the Erzurum Vilayet of the Ottoman Empire and Kars Oblast of the Russian Empire. After the Armenian genocide of 1915, most of Erzurum's Armenian population took refuge to the Russian-controlled parts of Armenia. The city of Kars and its Russian oblast became part of the First Republic of Armenia in 1918, but was occupied by Kemalist Turkey as a result of the Turkish–Armenian War in fall 1920.

Today, it is one of the most widely spoken Western Armenian dialects, most of which became virtually extinct after the genocide. Nowadays, it is spoken in the northwest of Armenia (in and around the city of Gyumri) and by the Armenian minority in Georgia's Samtskhe-Javakheti province.

== History ==
According to Prof. Haykanush Mesropyan of the Armenian State Institute of Linguistics, the first reference to the provincial dialect (զբառսն զեզերականս) dates back to the 8th century work by Stepanos Syunetsi, who refers to it as զՍպերացն zSperatsn "of Sper". The dialect was also mentioned in the 13th century by Hovhannes Yerznkatsi and in the 17th century by Hakob Karnetsi. In 1887, Alexander Thomson, in his Linguistic studies (Лингвистические исследования) briefly discussed the Akhaltsikhe dialect.

== Area spoken ==
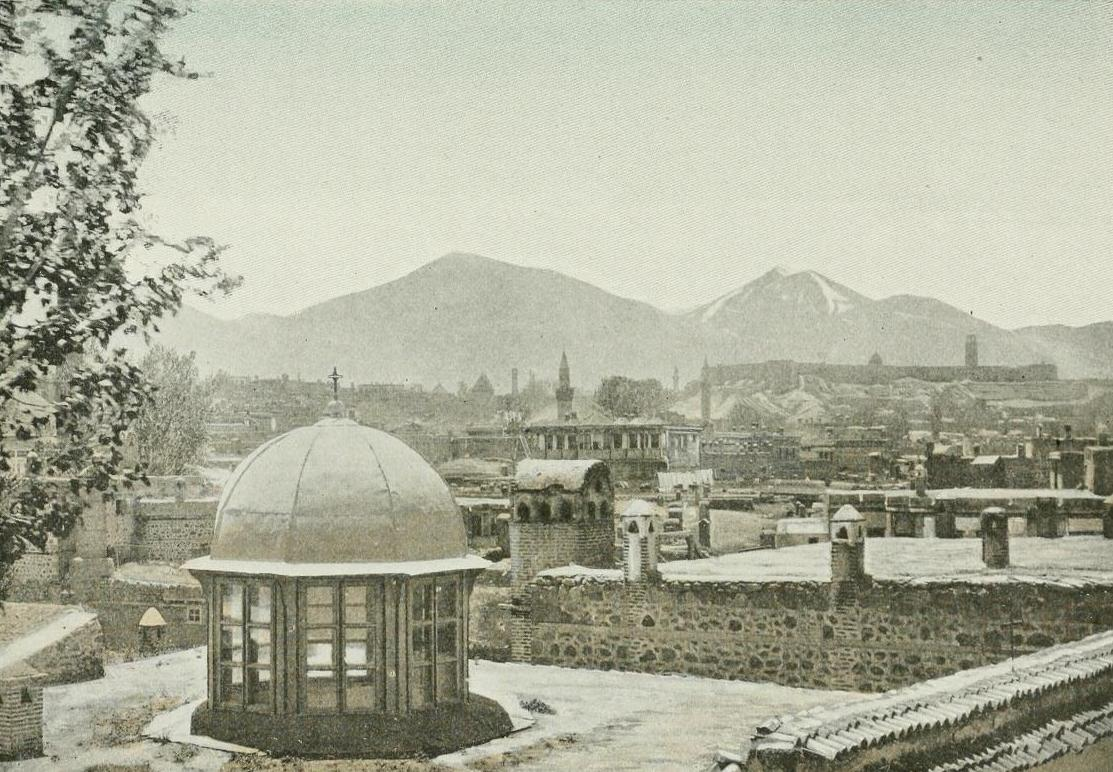
Erzerum
population: 60,000
25% Armenian (1909)

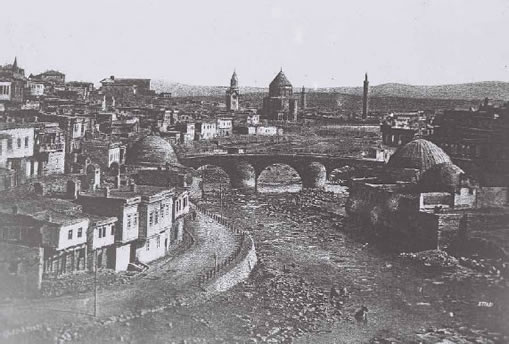
Kars
population: 21,000
50% Armenian (1897)

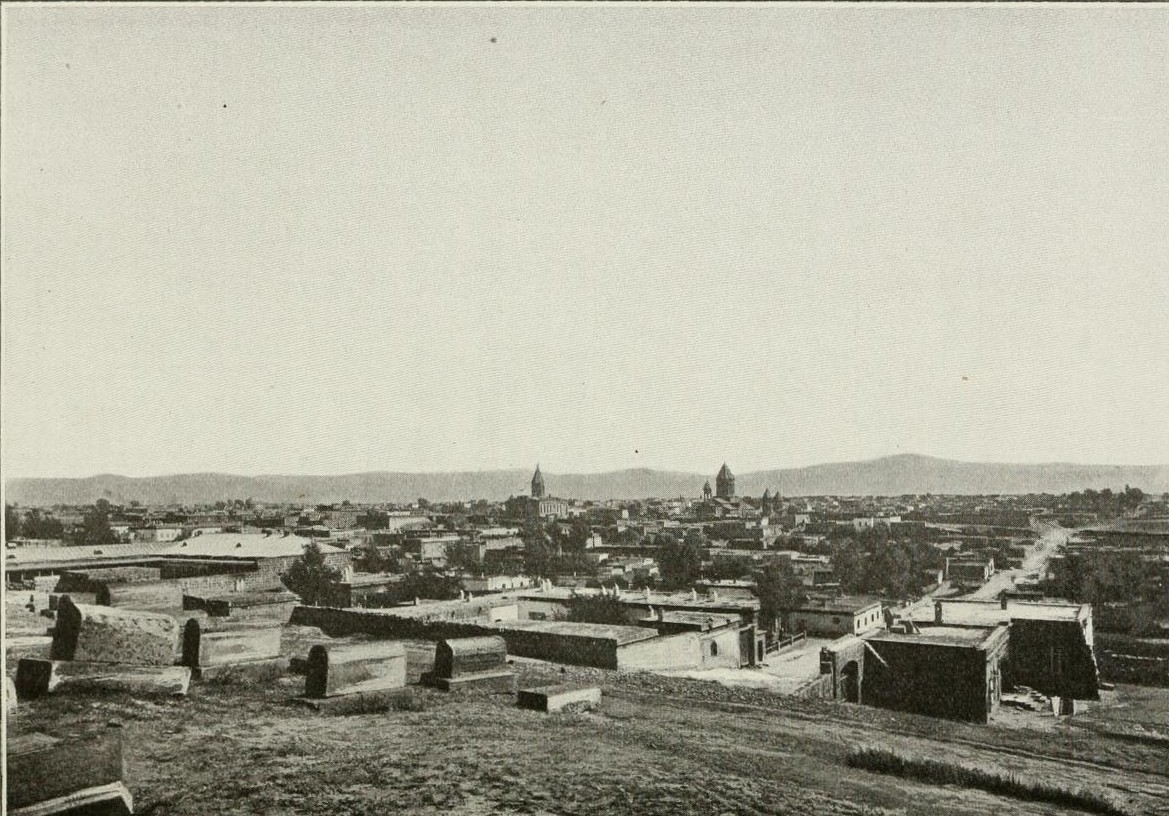
Alexandropol
population: 31,000
70% Armenian (1897)

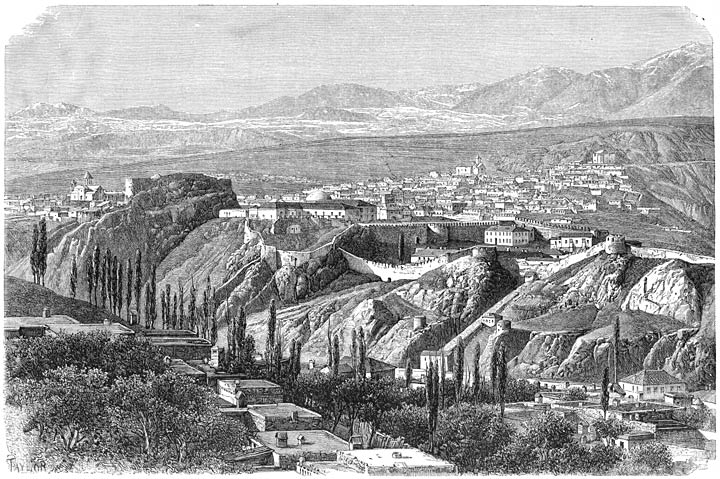
Akhaltsikhe
population: 15,000
60% Armenian (1897)

According to the prominent Armenian linguist Hrachia Adjarian's 1909 book Classification des dialectes arméniens, Karin dialect was spoken in the cities of Erzurum (which he refers to as the dialectal center), Kars (both large cities in eastern Turkey today), Alexandropol and Akhaltsikh. After the 1828–29 and 1877–78 Russo-Turkish Wars, Armenians from the Erzurum region migrated to the Russian-controlled Eastern Armenia. They mostly settled in Javakheti (in and around the cities of Akhalkalaki and Akhaltsikhe) and Shirak.

=== Today ===
In the Republic of Armenia, Karin dialect is chiefly spoken in the cities of Gyumri, Artik, Akhuryan and Aghin, all in Shirak Province (in around 130 villages). It is spoken in the western parts of the Aragatsotn Province: mainly in the city of Talin and villages of Aragats and Nor Artik. Residents of three villages in northern Aragatsotn (Geghadzor, Lernapar, Geghadir) also speak in Karin dialect. Karin dialect is spoken in the villages of Martuni (Gegharkunik), Urtsadzor (Ararat), Buzhakan and Kaputan in Kotayk.

The Karin dialect is also spoken by the Armenians in Samtskhe-Javakheti province of Georgia.

== Pronunciation ==
Hrachia Adjarian called the pronunciation of Karin dialect "soft and pleasing." According to him, the dialect has three degrees of consonants, mutated as follows:

բ [bʰ]	—	պ [b]	—	փ [pʰ]
դ [dʰ]	—	տ [d]	—	թ [tʰ]
գ [ɡʰ]	—	կ [ɡ]	—	ք [kʰ]
ձ [dzʰ]	—	ծ [dz]	—	ց [tsʰ]
ջ [dʒʰ]	—	ճ [dʒ]	—	չ [tʃʰ]

== Famous speakers ==
- Jivani (1846–1909), gusan (folk musician) and poet
- Sheram (1857–1938), gusan (folk musician), poet and composer
- Stepan Malkhasyants (1857–1947), Dashnak politician
- Keri (1858–1916), Dashnak military commander, fedayee
- Hovhannes Katchaznouni (1868–1938), Dashnak politician, Prime Minister of Armenia in 1918–1919
- Armen Garo (1872–1923), Dashnak politician, the first Armenian ambassador to the US
- Hamo Ohanjanyan (1873–1947), Dashnak politician, Prime Minister of Armenia in 1920
- Avetik Isahakyan (1875–1957) writer, public activist
- Derenik Demirchian (1877–1956), writer
- Yeghishe Charents (1897–1937), poet
- Ruben Ter-Minasian (1882–1951), military commander
- Hakob Kojoyan (1883–1959), painter
- Grégoire-Pierre Agagianian (1895–1971), Cardinal, leader of the Armenian Catholic Church
- Kourken Yanigian (1895–1984), author, engineer, assassinated two Turkish consular officials in Los Angeles
- Hovhannes Shiraz (1915–1984), poet
- Mher Mkrtchyan (1930–1993), actor
- Vazgen Manukyan (b. 1946), politician, Prime Minister of Armenia 1990–1991
- Levon Ishtoyan (b. 1947), football player
- Harutyun Khachatryan (b. 1955), film director
- Yurik Vardanyan (b. 1956), weightlifter, Olympic, World and European champion
- Levon Julfalakyan (b 1964), wrestler, Olympic, World and European champion
- Israel Militosyan (b. 1968), weightlifter, Olympic, World and European champion
- Mko (b. 1976), comedian
- Gevorg Davtyan (b. 1983), weightlifter, European champion
- Nazik Avdalyan (b. 1986), weightlifter, World and European champion
- Arsen Julfalakyan (b. 1987), wrestler, European champion
- Tigran Gevorg Martirosyan (b. 1988), weightlifter, World and European champion
