= Mush dialect =

Dialect of Armenian

Mush
- Մշոյ բարբառ
- Native to: Georgia, Armenia
- Ethnicity: Armenians
- Native speakers: (undated figure of 3,000)
- Language family: Indo-European: Armenian; Western; Mush
- Writing system: Armenian alphabet

Language codes
- ISO 639-3: (included in Western Armenian [hyw])
- Glottolog: muss1244
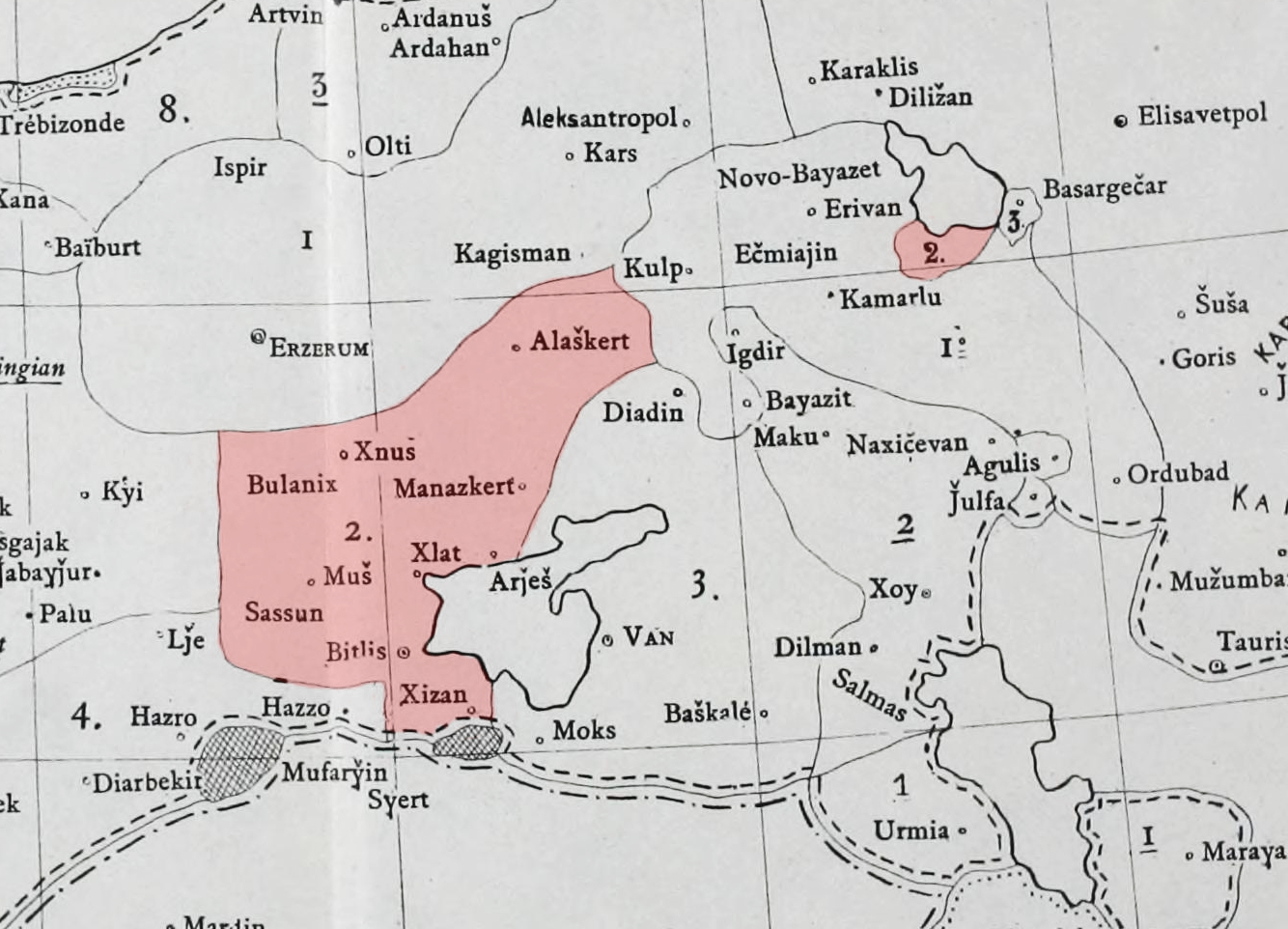
- The area where the Mush dialect was spoken before the Armenian genocide (according to Hrachia Adjarian's 1909 book Classification des dialectes arméniens)

The Mush dialect (Armenian: Մշոյ բարբառ, Mšo barbař) is a Western Armenian dialect formerly spoken in the city of Mush (Muş) and the historic region of Taron, in present-day eastern Turkey. As a result of the extermination of the native Armenian population during the genocide of 1915, the dialect is almost completely extinct today with only several thousand native speakers in a number of villages in Armenia and three Armenian-populated villages in the Samtskhe-Javakheti province of Georgia.

== Area spoken ==
According to Hrachia Adjarian in the early 20th century, the Mush dialect was spoken in the cities of Bitlis, Xizan (Hizan), Khlat (Xlat), Arjesh, Bulanikh, Manazkert, Khnus (Xnus), and Alashkert. The dialect was spread to the west of Lake Van.

During the Russo-Turkish War of (1877–78), Armenians from Mush and Alashkert established villages in the Erivan Governorate: in Aparan and south of Novo-Bayazit (present-day Gavar). According to Adjarian there were 21 Armenian villages in the Erivan Governorate where the Mush dialect was spoken. Another group of Armenians from Khnus settled near Akhalkalaki, particularly in three villages: Heshtia, Toria and Ujmana.

According to a 1955 article the Mush dialect was spoken in villages located in the following districts (raion) of Soviet Armenia: Talin, Aparan, Artik, Aghin, Ejmiatsin, and Martuni.

One notable village in Armenia where the dialect is still spoken is Kamo in the northwestern Shirak Province.

== Notable speakers ==
- Gegham Ter-Karapetian (Msho Gegham) (1856–1918), writer, poet
- Arabo (1863–1893), fedayi
- Aghbiur Serob (1864–1899), fedayi
- Hrayr Dzhoghk (1864–1904), fedayi
- Kevork Chavush (1870–1907), fedayi
- Makhluto (1872–1956), fedayi
- Armenak Shahmuradyan (1878–1939), singer
- William Saroyan (1908–1981), US-born writer
- Khachik Dashtents (1910–1981), writer

== Songs in Mush dialect ==
- "Zartir lao" - ashugh Fahrat (1890s)
- "Dle yaman" - written down by Komitas Vardapet in early 20th century, performed by Lusine Zakaryan, Flora Martirosian, Isabel Bayrakdarian,
- "Lily" - Armenoids (2007)
- Gulo - Hasmik Harutyunyan
