= Gezaldara (disambiguation) =

Gezaldara may refer to:

- Aznvadzor, Armenia
- Gekhadzor, Armenia
- Vardenik, Armenia
- Verkhnyaya Gezaldara, Armenia
