= Urmi =

Urmi may refer to:

- Urmi, also spelled Oormi, means ocean in Sanskrit and also a name of Vyuha formation in Hindu epic Mahabharata
- Urmi (river), in Khabarovsk Krai, Russia
- Urmi, Estonia, a village in Palupera Parish, Valga County, Estonia
- Urmia, a city in Iranian Azerbaijan
- Lake Urmia, a salt lake near the city
- Urmi Juvekar, Indian filmmaker
- Urmi (film), 2023 Indian Marathi-language romantic drama film
- Urmis village in Azerbaijan
- Urmi Basu, Indian activist
- Urmi Desai, Indian writer

== See also ==
- Urumi (disambiguation)
