= Aygedzor (disambiguation) =

Aygedzor may refer to:

- Aygedzor, Tavush, Armenia
- Aygedzor, northern Syunik, Armenia
- Aygedzor, southern Syunik, Armenia
- Aygezard, Ararat, Armenia
