= Dargalu (disambiguation) =

Dargalu is a former name of Aygezard, a town in the Ararat Province of Armenia.

Dargalu or Darghalu may also refer to:

- Dargalu Verkhniy, Ararat Province, Armenia
- Darghalu, West Azerbaijan Province, Iran
