= Nerkin Gezaldara =

Nerkin Gezaldara or Nizhnyaya Gezaldara may refer to:

- Geghadir, Aragatsotn, Armenia
- Vardenik, Armenia
