= Arshak Brutyan =

Armenian musician and artist (1864–1936)

Arshak Brutyan (September 21 (October 3), 1864 – August 25, 1936) was an Armenian musician, pedagogue, songwriter, choirmaster, and artist. He was born in Karaberd, Alexandropol Province, in the Viceroyalty of the Caucasus, Russian Empire, and died in Leninakan, Armenian SSR, TSFSR, USSR. Notably, he was the father of the painter Gevorg Brutyan.

== Biography ==
Arshak Brutyan was born in 1864 in the present-day Karaberd (former Dashdala) village․ The origins of the family were from the Armenian province of Mush. In 1876 he graduated with excellent grades from the parochial school of the Harichi company in Ghpchagh village and continued his studies at the Gevorgian Seminary of St. Etchmiadzin. After receiving education here again with brilliant progress, in 1888 he returned to Alexandropol.

In Brutyan's personal archive, which is located in Charents Museum of Literature and Arts, there is a unique document, a certificate written by Komitas, certifying that Brutyan has the best knowledge of the European and new Armenian notation system, thanks to which he can give lessons at the communal school of the Saint Astvatsatsin Church in Alexandrapol.

However, there was another sphere of activity, which was dear and holy to Brutyan. It was the collection work, which should be evaluated as exceptionally valuable and progressive by the standards of its time. The folk song as a lasting value took its stable place in the multi-field occupations of a profound intellectual. Today, thanks to his efforts, it is possible to get a unique idea about the characteristics of Shirak's folk song. In this sense, Shirak was the bearer of a colorful and multi-styled song culture.

In this same environment, heroic, national patriotic songs took a special place, which were:

- “Քաջ Արաբոյի երգը” (literal translation – The song of brave Arabo)
- “Բայազետցի Կոստոյի երգը” (literal translation – The song of Kosto from Bayazeth)
- “Էկավ հասավ Վանա ծովուն” (literal translation - Came and Reached to Lake Vana, this is praise to general Arshak Ter-Ghukasyan)
- “Ձայն մը հնչեց Էրզրումեն” (literal translation – A voice sounded in Erzurum) and so on.

Brutyan started public folk concerts in Alexandropol, he was the first to go on stage with his groups wearing national taraz (Armenian traditional dress), and most importantly, he contributed to the spread of four-part singing. He was one of the first figures to instill and spread polyphony in Armenian musical life. In 1882, he graduated from the Gevorgian Seminary of Etchmiadzin, as an artist, in 1903 he was improved at the Academy of Fine Arts in Saint Petersburg. Brutyan taught in different schools of Alexandropol, he collected folk songs (around 500) in 1895. He recorded and wrote pastoral and spiritual songs, created and led choirs. He saved the songs of Jivani, Khayat and other troubadours from possible loss.

== Drawing activity ==
He is the author of portraits and icons of A. Mkhitaryantsi, Garegin Levonyan, T. Antikyan and others.

== Memory ==
The music school N4 of Gyumri is named after Brutyan.

== Testimonials about Arshak Brutyan ==
Arshak Brutyan started public folk concerts in Alexandropol, was the first to go on stage with his groups wearing national taraz (Armenian traditional dress) and, most importantly, contributed to the spread of four-part singing. He was one of the first figures to instill and spread polyphony in Armenian musical life.

— Margarit Brutyan, musician

== Works ==
- Textbook of Armenian church recording, Vagharshapat, 1890.
- Plebeian murmurs (recorded collection), E., 1985. (introduction and notes from M. Brutyan).
