= Pamb =

Pamb may refer to

- Lernapar, Armenia, formerly Armenian Pamb
- Sipan, Armenia, formerly Kurdish Pamb
