= Karaberd =

Karaberd or K’araberd may refer to:

- Karaberd, Lori, Armenia
- Karaberd, Shirak, Armenia
