= Ramis, Azerbaijan =

Coordinates: 39.0719°N 45.9827°E

Ramis (Armenian: Ռամիս, Russian: Рамис) is an ancient settlement in Goghtn Region of Armenia, currently named Urmis and included in Ordubad region of Nakhchivan Autonomous Republic of Azerbaijan.

Numerous ruins found here prove that it has been inhabited for more than 2,000 years. Until the first quarter of 20th century, many Armenian families lived here. There are ruins of churches, mills, fortresses and the St. Astvatsatsin church, the latter built on the site of an ancient pagan religious building.

== See also ==
- Urmis
- St. Astvatsatsin Church
- St. Sargis Church (hy)
