= Nor-Nakhichevan dialect =

Dialect of Western Armenian

Nor-Nakhichevan
- New-Nakhichevan, Crimean, Don, Nakhichevan-on-Don
- Նոր Նախիջևանի բարբառ
- Native to: Russia
- Region: Rostov-on-Don (Nakhichevan-on-Don)
- Ethnicity: Don Armenians
- Native speakers: 13,154 (2010)
- Language family: Indo-European: Armenian; Western; Nor-Nakhichevan
- Writing system: Armenian alphabet

Language codes
- ISO 639-3: (included in Western Armenian hyw)
- Glottolog: crim1254
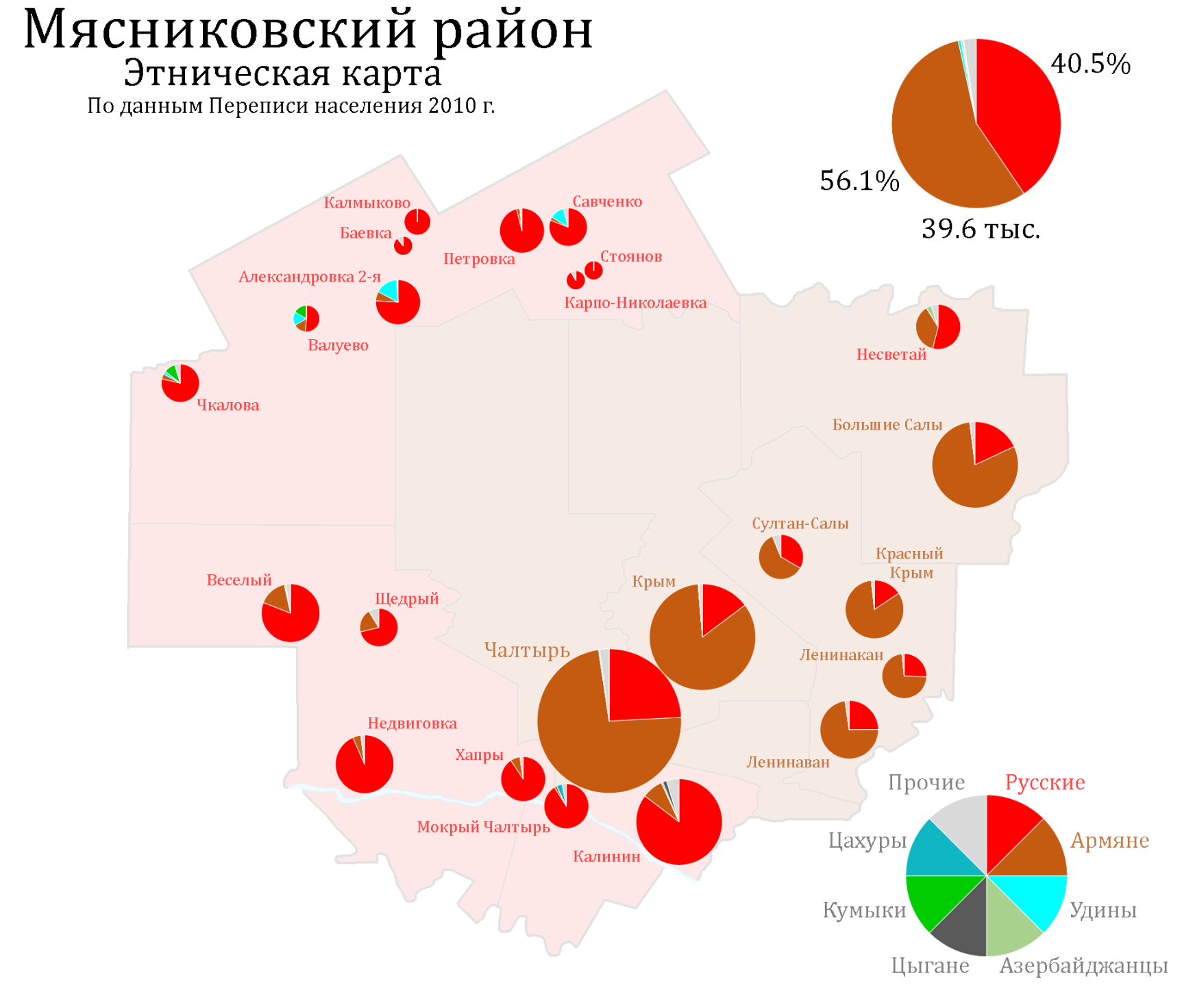
- Ethnic map of Myasnikovsky District of the Rostov Oblast according to the 2010 census.

Nor-Nakhichevan Armenian or Don Armenian is a dialect of Western Armenian that is spoken by residents in the southwest of the Rostov Oblast, in the Myasnikovsky District and in Rostov-on-Don itself.

The dialect is divided into two forms - the main dialect and the subdialect. Speakers of the main form represent the majority of the general speakers of the Nor-Nakhichevan dialect and live in Nakhichevan-on-Don, in the villages of Bolshiye Saly, Sultan Saly and Nesvetai. Speakers of the subdialect form live compactly in the villages of Chaltyr and Krym.

== History ==
The Nor-Nakhichevan dialect was formed in the community of Armenians who migrated to the lower reaches of the Don from Crimea, who had previously been forced to move there from Western Armenia, a historical region in the east of modern Turkey, where a large number of Armenians lived in ancient times.

The first major study of the Nor-Nakhichevan Armenian dialect was made by the Armenian linguist, professor Hrachia Acharian, who was known for his works in the field of dialectology, lexicology, lexicography, history of language, etc. The first dictionary of the Nor-Nakhichevan dialect, developed by the Armenian philologist Gevorg Jalashyan, was based on his works. He studied the research of R. Acharyan, classified them, developed and enriched them with a more detailed analysis of both the phonetic features and the vocabulary of the dialect.

== Features ==
- According to the etymology originally described in the works of Hrachia Acharian and G. Jalashyan, the subdialectal form of Nor-Nakhichevan Armenian retains the conjugation in u that existed in Old Armenian, although it is quite rare and only a few verbs belong to it. Examples:k'tsutsunum, k'tsutsunus, k'tsutsune, k'tsutsunuk, k'tsutsunun, k'tsutsununk; g'ulum, g'ulus, g'ule, g'uluk, g'ulun, g'ulunk; g'desnum, g'desnus, g'desne, g'desnuk, g'desnun, g'desnunk; k'temuztsunum, k'temuztsunus, k'temuztsune, k'temuztsunuk, k'temuztsunun, k'temuztsununk, etc.
- Armenians have an ancient religious holiday called Vardavar that is celebrated 14 weeks after Easter. Its characteristic custom is to pour water on each other. The holiday is still celebrated annually by the Don Armenians, who gather near the Holy Cross Church. In Rostov's Nakhichevan, the locals call it Vartevor, and in Chaltyr, Vashtevor.
