= Shabin–Karahisar dialect =

Dialect of Armenian

Shabin-Karahisar dialect
- Shabin-Karahisar, Colonia
- Շապին Գարահիսար բարբառ
- Native to: Şebinkarahisar
- Ethnicity: Armenians
- Language family: Indo-European: Armenian; Western; Shabin-Karahisar dialect
- Writing system: Armenian alphabet

Language codes
- ISO 639-3: (included in Western Armenian hyw)
- Glottolog: shab1249

The Shabin–Karahisar dialect is a Western Armenian dialect that was spoken in the province of Şebinkarahisar and around the vicinity of Akıncılar, the region was in antiquity part of the Kelkit plains and was part of the Roman province of Colonia in Armenia. Referred to as Koghonya by Armenians in the Middle Ages during the rule of the Eretnids. Passing to Ottoman rule, the dialect developed under the influence of the Constantinople dialect.

== Dialect features ==
Hrachia Acharian described the dialect being similar in accent and tone to the neighboring Armenian dialects of Sivas and Tokat. The dialect had a mutation where the letter ո(o) for most words was pronounced as էո(ēo). So the word Gortz(work) was pronounced Gēortz. The letter ե(e) for most words was pronounced with an ի(ee) sound, so Tegh(place) was pronounced digh, Kez(your) as Kiz, Het'(with) as Hid, these mutations he compares to the Hamshen dialect which has the same features.

== Story in dialect ==
- In Dialect: Mikhk'is dern ēm, Khosgis Hasdad chi dëdva. Girës shad yushatvav. Imma shidagë or bidi ësim në shad mën ghabiyats dzarë che. Bani Gēordzi mart em. Yiringun-Yarravod Digh më Didig aradz chunim.
- Eastern Armenian comparison: Mekhk'is t'ern ēm, khoskës hastat chi datvi, Girës shat' ushatsav, Hima shidagë vor pit'i asem im hantsanks tzanr chi. Bani Gortzi mart em. Eregun-Arravot' mi Tegh tesa vor aratz chunim.

== Speakers ==
- Aram Haigaz 1900–1986. Author
- Andranik Ozanian 1865–1927. Fedayi
