= Hrach Martirosyan =

Armenian linguist

Hrach K. Martirosyan
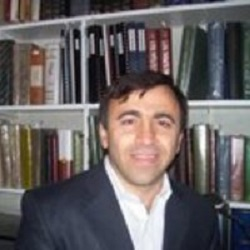
- Hrach Martirosyan
- Born: 1964 (age 61–62)
- Occupation: linguist

Hrach K. Martirosyan (Armenian: Հրաչ Մարտիրոսյան; born in Vanadzor in 1964) is an Armenian linguist. He is currently Lecturer in Eastern Armenian in the department of Near Eastern Languages and Cultures at University of California, Los Angeles (UCLA).

Martirosyan considers himself a student of Heinrich Hübschmann and Hrachia Acharian. He received a PhD in Comparative Linguistics by defending the dissertation "Studies in Armenian Etymology with Special Emphasis on Dialects and Culture" at Leiden University in 2008.

Martirosyan has lectured at University of Michigan and Yerevan State University. He has talked about linguistics and the Armenian language in interviews with Public Television of Armenia, Shoghakat TV, independent Boon TV, Aravot, 1in.am, and other Armenian media outlets.

== Views ==
He identifies as an atheist. In May 2014 he was among the intellectuals who signed an open letter declaring their opposition to the Yerevan City Council decision to erect a statue of Anastas Mikoyan, a controversial Armenian-born Bolshevik and Soviet statesman.

== Publications ==
- Etymological Dictionary of the Armenian Inherited Lexicon. BRILL. 2009. ISBN 9789004173378.
- "The place of Armenian in the Indo-European language family: the relationship with Greek and Indo-Iranian" (2013), Journal of Language Relationship
