= Kharberd–Yerznka dialect =

Dialect of Armenian

Kharberd-Yerznka
- Kharberd
- խարբերդ-երզնկա բարբառ
- Native to: Elazığ, Tunceli, Erzincan
- Ethnicity: Armenians
- Native speakers: unknown
- Language family: Indo-European: Armenian; Western; Kharberd-Yerznka
- Writing system: Armenian alphabet

Language codes
- ISO 639-3: (included in Western Armenian [hyw])
- Glottolog: khar1280
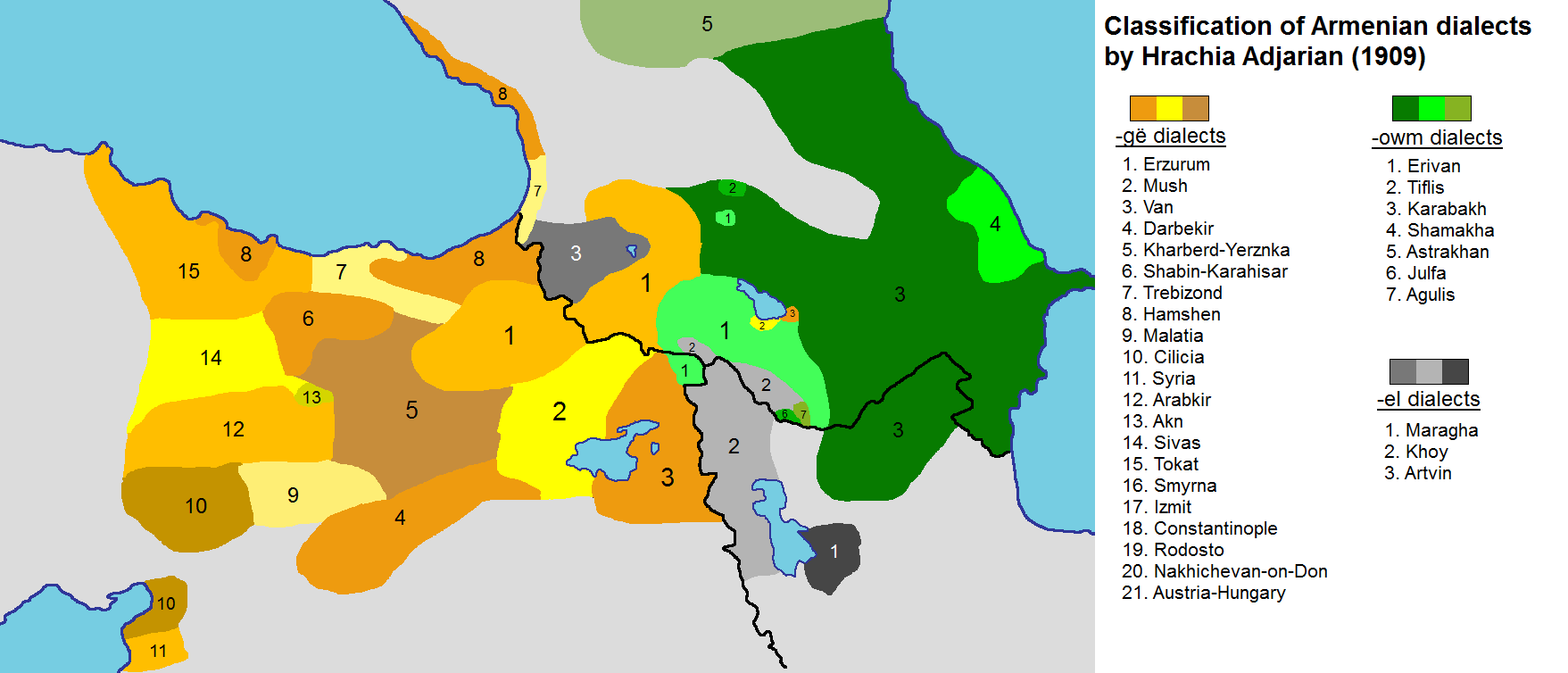
- Map of the Armenian dialects in early 20th century, including Kharberd-Erznkad Kharberd-Yerznka

The Kharberd–Yerznka dialect was a group of varieties of Western Armenian that were spoken in the regions of Kharberd, Erzincan, Dersim, and Kiğı in the Ottoman Empire before WWI. After which it was spoken only in the diaspora In Syria, Romania, United States, and Lebanon. Although the Dersim variety was still spoken in Tunceli until 1938 when The Alevi Ashirets were dissolved and the remaining Armenians of Tunceli became Alevi and were assimilated into Zaza society.

== Variations ==
Hrachia Acharian wrote short stories in different regional variations of the dialect in his 1909 book.

- Kharberd Subdialect: Gëli Chëli Khoroz më gëlli, As Khorozin Odkë push më gë mënna, Inch Geneh Chener chi gërnër ad pushë haner. Gellah gerta mamigi më gësa, ki as pushë hana!
- Eastern Armenian comparison: Këlini Chi-Lini, Mi aklor Këlini, Es Aklori Votkë push k'mtni, Ich arav charav chk'aroghatsav et pushë haner. K'elni kerta mayrin kasi, es pushë hani!
- Dersim Subdialect: Tsors dzin al Barrgetsutsi, Meg martun al glokhë gëyretsi, Desa or pasan Gëseh, Ha babam olasëz, tsi gider o yes im, ëni gide te turker Ghamber'n eh brnadz.
- Eastern Armenian: Chors dziyern el p'arkatsram, mek' marti glukhn dzer tvam, T'esa vor pasan asav, ha im papi dziyern, ch'giter vor yes im, inkë k'artzumer vor Turkerë Ghambarë vertsran.
- Erzincan Subdialect: Erikë k'ita dzovun kenarë kë nst'i, mek' hats ink kutë, mek'aln a dzovun dzk'nerun kë net'i. Anmen or medz dzouk më kuga ënonts dzerken k'arneh, k'tani agher. ësank' k'aneh t'ari më anmen or.
- Eastern Armenian: Erikë kerta tzovi shurj k'nsti, mek' hats inkë kuti, mek'n el tzovi dzoukerin k'neti. Amen or metz dzouk g'ga irants dzerkerits k'arni u k'tani. esi tarin amen or arav.

== Notable speakers ==
- Shahan Natalie (1884–1983) Author, Dashnak,
- Vahan Totovents (1889–1938) Writer, poet
- Tlgadintsi (1860–1915) Writer, poet
- Hamastegh (1895–1966) Writer, poet
- Soghomon Tehlirian (1896–1960)
- Varaztad Kazanjian (1879–1974) Dentist

== Songs and examples in the dialect ==
- Conversation in dialect
- Jacques Kebadian
- Husseinig ballad
- Gesurin naz bare
- Dersim folk music
