= Darghalu =

Darghalu دارغالو
- Village
- Location within Iran
- Coordinates: 37°33′43″N 45°11′58″E
- Country: Iran
- Province: West Azerbaijan
- County: Urmia
- Bakhsh: Central
- Rural District: Bakeshluchay

Population (2006)
  - Total: 290
- Time zone: UTC+3:30 (IRST)
  - Summer (DST): UTC+4:30 (IRDT)

Darghalu (Persian: دارغالو, also Romanized as Dārghālū) is a village in Bakeshluchay Rural District, in the Central District of Urmia County, West Azerbaijan Province, Iran. At the 2006 census, its population was 290, in 91 families.
