= Karaberd, Shirak =

Village in Shirak, Armenia

Karaberd Քարաբերդ
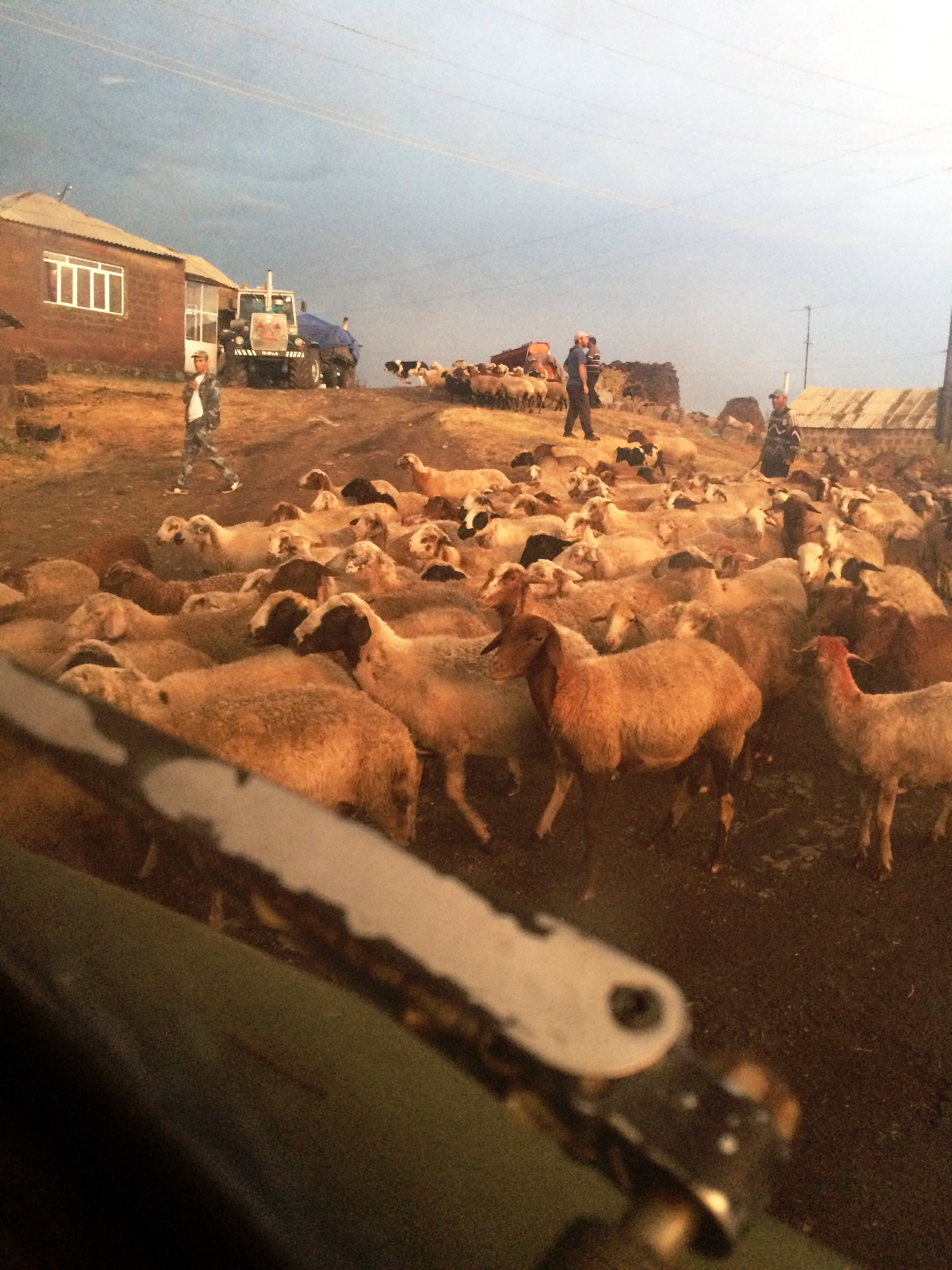
- Bringing sheep back to the village

- Location within Armenia Location within Shirak
- Coordinates: 40°32′37″N 43°49′40″E
- Country: Armenia
- Province: Shirak
- Municipality: Ani

Population (2011)
  - Total: 931
- Time zone: UTC+4
  - Summer (DST): UTC+5

Karaberd (Armenian: Քարաբերդ) is a village in the Ani Municipality of the Shirak Province of Armenia.

== Demographics ==
Historical population
Year	Pop.	±% p.a.
1831	87	—
1897	606	+2.98%
1926	769	+0.82%
1939	743	−0.26%
1959	475	−2.21%
1970	115	−12.10%
2001	1,090	+7.52%
2011	931	−1.56%

== Notable people ==
- Arshak Brutyan, was an Armenian musician, pedagogue, songwriter, choirmaster, and artist.
