= Yuxarı Əndəmic =

- Municipality
- Location within Azerbaijan
- Coordinates: 38°55′33″N 46°01′02″E
- Country: Azerbaijan
- Autonomous republic: Nakhchivan
- District: Ordubad

Population
  - Total: 967
- Time zone: UTC+4 (AZT)

Yuxarı Əndəmic (also, Yuxarı Əndəmiç, Yuxarı Əndəli, Yukhari Andamish, and Yukhary Andamich) is a village and municipality in the Ordubad District of Nakhchivan, Azerbaijan. As of 2010 It has a population of 967.

== Etymology ==
In the 19th century, the families who moved out from this village then built a new settlement on the bank of the Ordubad River, a bit in the down side The new village was named Aşağı (Lower) Əndəmic, and the old village Yuxarı (Upper) Əndəmic. In the spoken language of the people, the words of əndə express the meaning "up and down", "pothole" and mış "the place where water accumulated". So the name means "the groove where water accumulated, pit in the ground".
