= Verkhnyaya Gezaldara =

Abandoned village in Gegharkunik, Armenia

- Location within Armenia
- Coordinates: 40°05′59″N 45°28′21″E
- Country: Armenia
- Marz (Province): Gegharkunik
- Time zone: UTC+4

Verkhnyaya Gezaldara is an abandoned village in Gegharkunik Province of Armenia.

== See also ==
- Gegharkunik Province
