= Urmis =

- Location within Azerbaijan
- Coordinates: 39°04′18″N 45°58′20″E
- Country: Azerbaijan
- Autonomous republic: Nakhchivan
- Time zone: UTC+4 (AZT)
  - Summer (DST): UTC+5 (AZT)

Urmis (also, Urumys) is a village in the Nakhchivan Autonomous Republic of Azerbaijan.

== See also ==
- Ramis, Azerbaijan
- St. Astvatsatsin Church
- St. Sargis Church (hy)
