= Nor Artik =

Nor Artik Նոր Արթիկ
- Location within Armenia Location within Aragatsotn
- Coordinates: 40°27′N 43°42′E
- Country: Armenia
- Province: Aragatsotn
- Municipality: Talin
- Founded: 1902

Population (2011)
  - Total: 478
- Time zone: UTC+4
  - Summer (DST): UTC+5

Nor Artik (Armenian: Նոր Արթիկ) is a village in the Talin Municipality of the Aragatsotn Province of Armenia.
