= Benli =

Benli is a surname. Notable people with the surname include:

- Engin Benli (born 1970), Turkish actor
- Ibrahim Benli (born 1979), Danish politician
- Lehize Hilal Benli (born 1990), Turkish martial artist
- Nilay Benli (born 1985), Turkish volleyball player
- Perihan Benli (1942–2016), Turkish socialite
