= Urumi (disambiguation) =

The urumi is a long Indian whip-like sword.

Urumi may also refer to:

- Urumi (drum), a double-headed hour-glass shaped drum used in South India
- Urumi (film), a 2011 Indian Malayalam-language film
- Urumi language, an extinct Tupian language of Brazil
- Urumi Kanzaki, a character from Great Teacher Onizuka
- Urumi Ushizaki, a character from the video game Wily Beast and Weakest Creature in the Touhou Project series
