= Lernapar =

Lernapar Լեռնապար
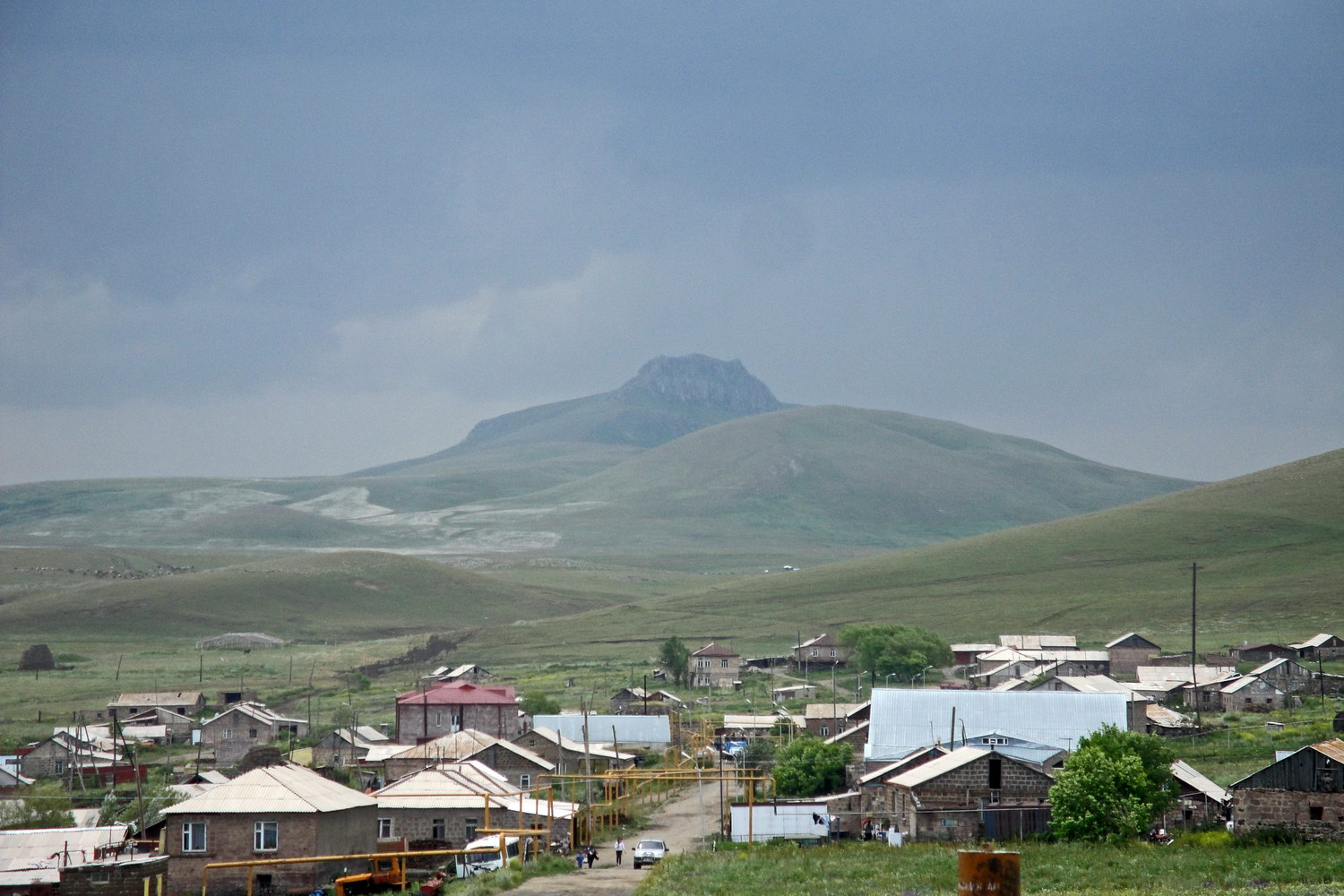
- Lernapar with Tsaghkasar Mountain (background)

- Location within Armenia Location within Aragatsotn
- Coordinates: 40°44′55″N 44°09′38″E
- Country: Armenia
- Province: Aragatsotn
- Municipality: Tsaghkahovit

Population (2011)
  - Total: 536
- Time zone: UTC+4
  - Summer (DST): UTC+5

Lernapar (Armenian: Լեռնապար) is a village in the Tsaghkahovit Municipality of the Aragatsotn Province of Armenia.

== Gallery ==
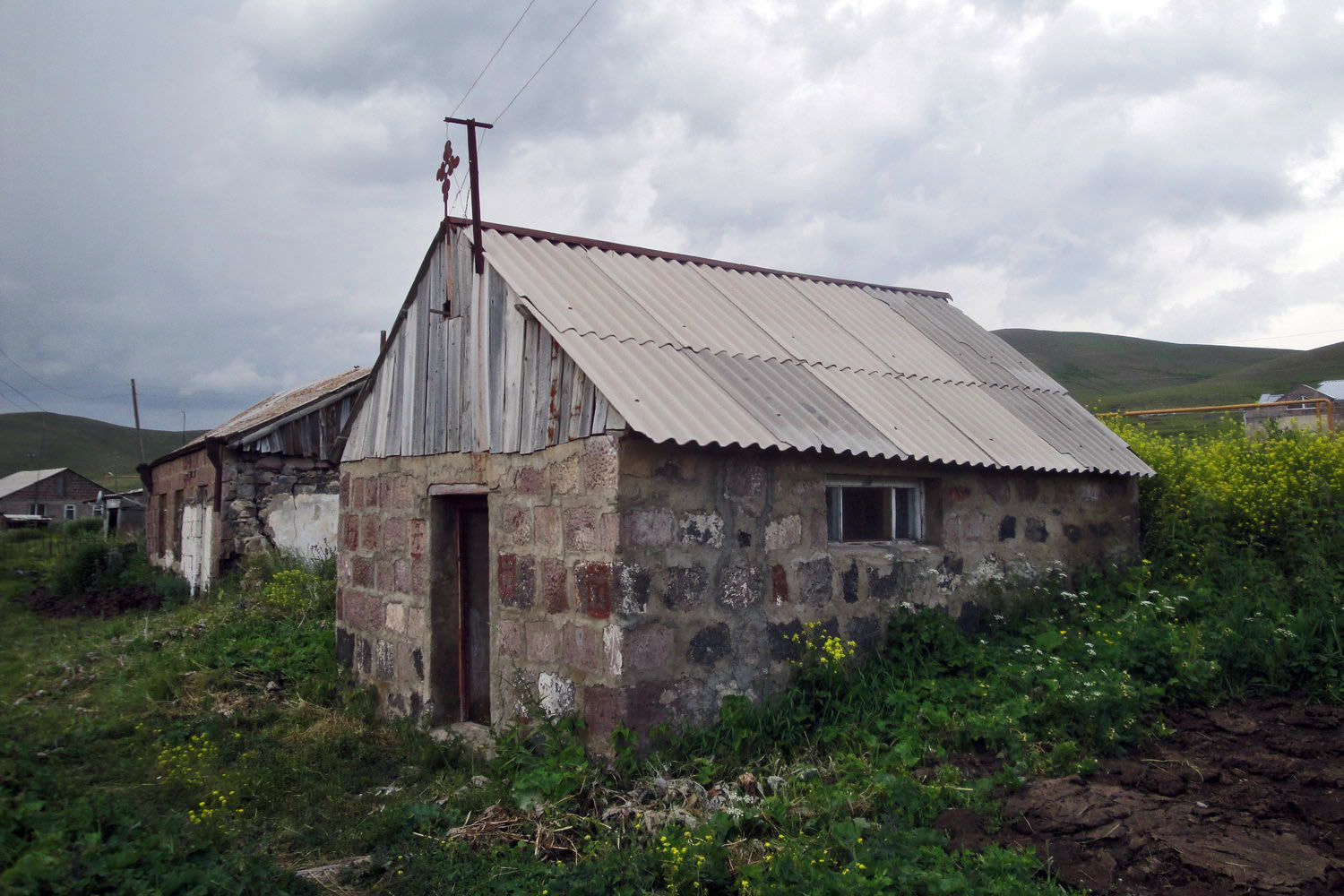
Village chapel

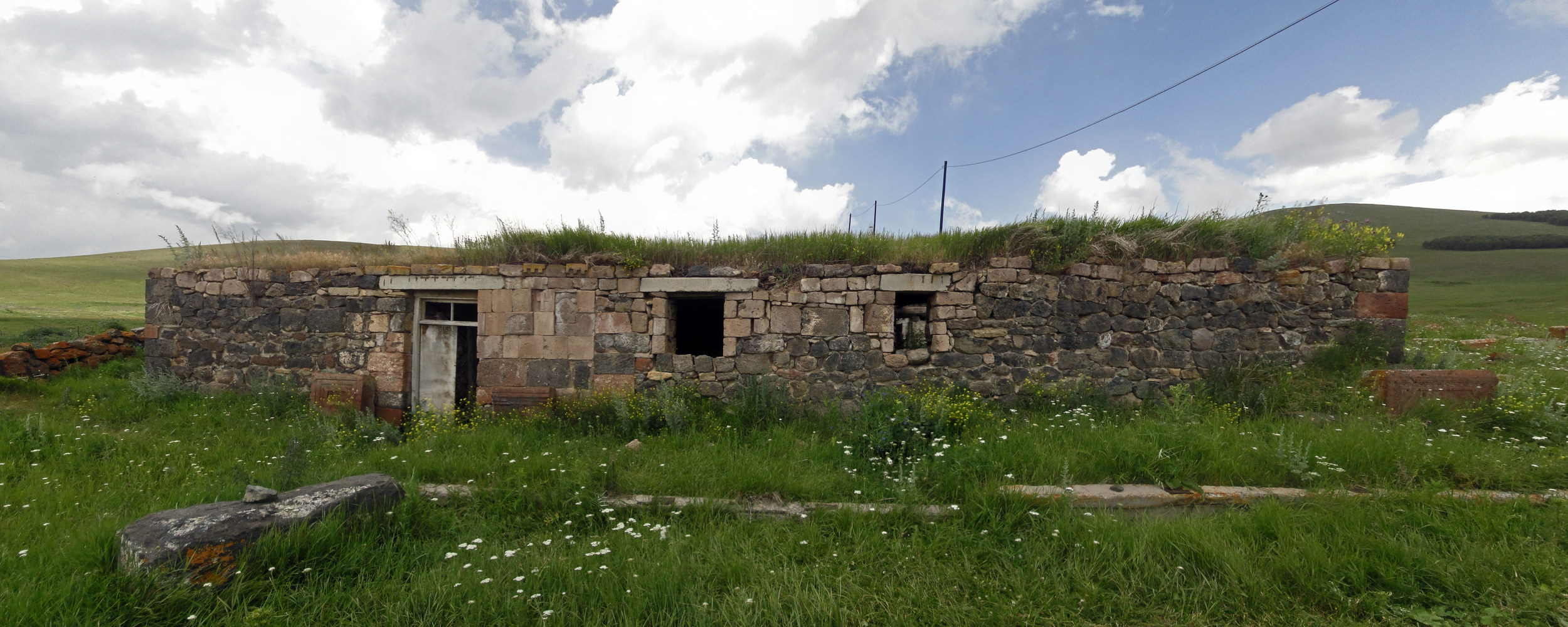
Church ruins in the village

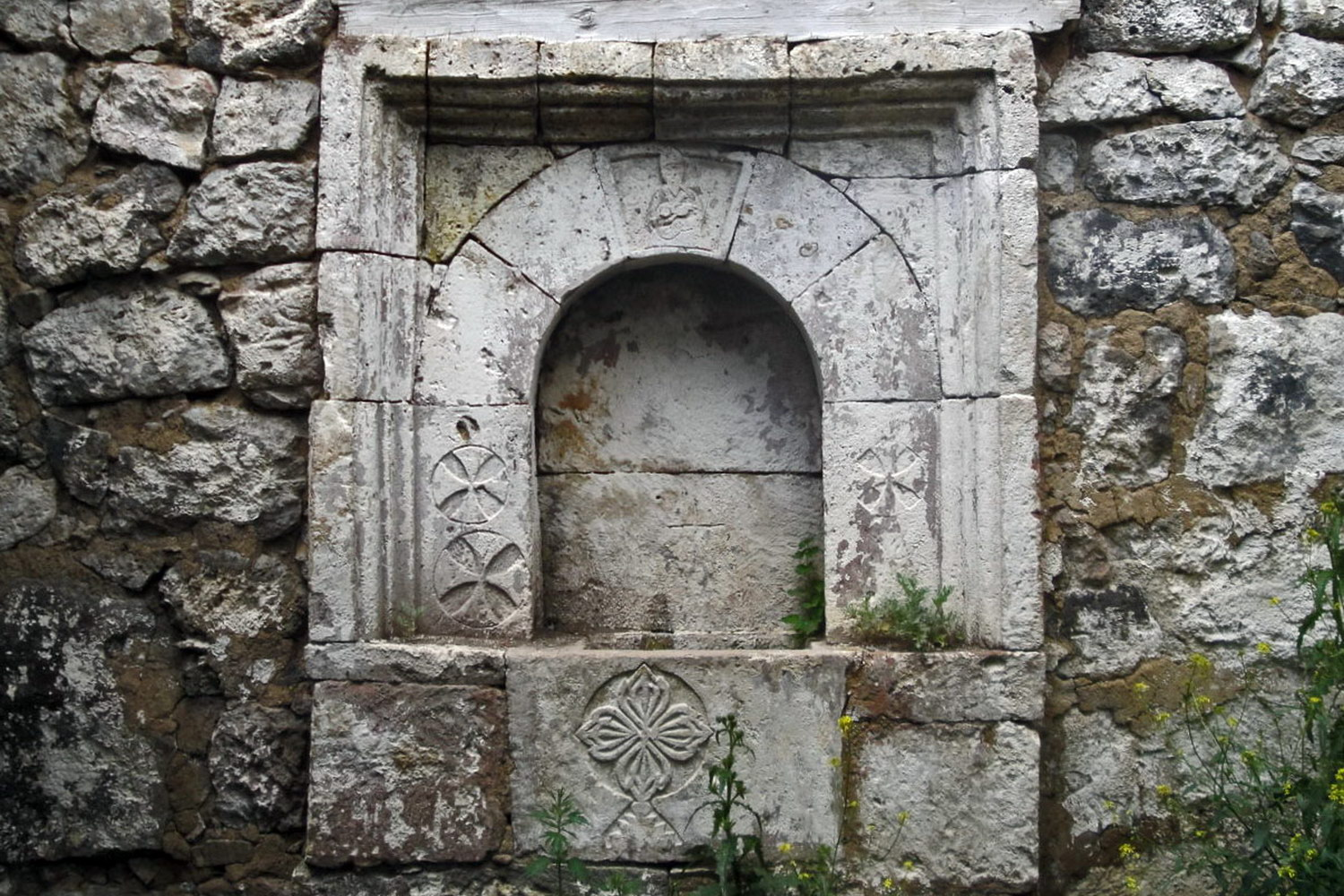
Church niche

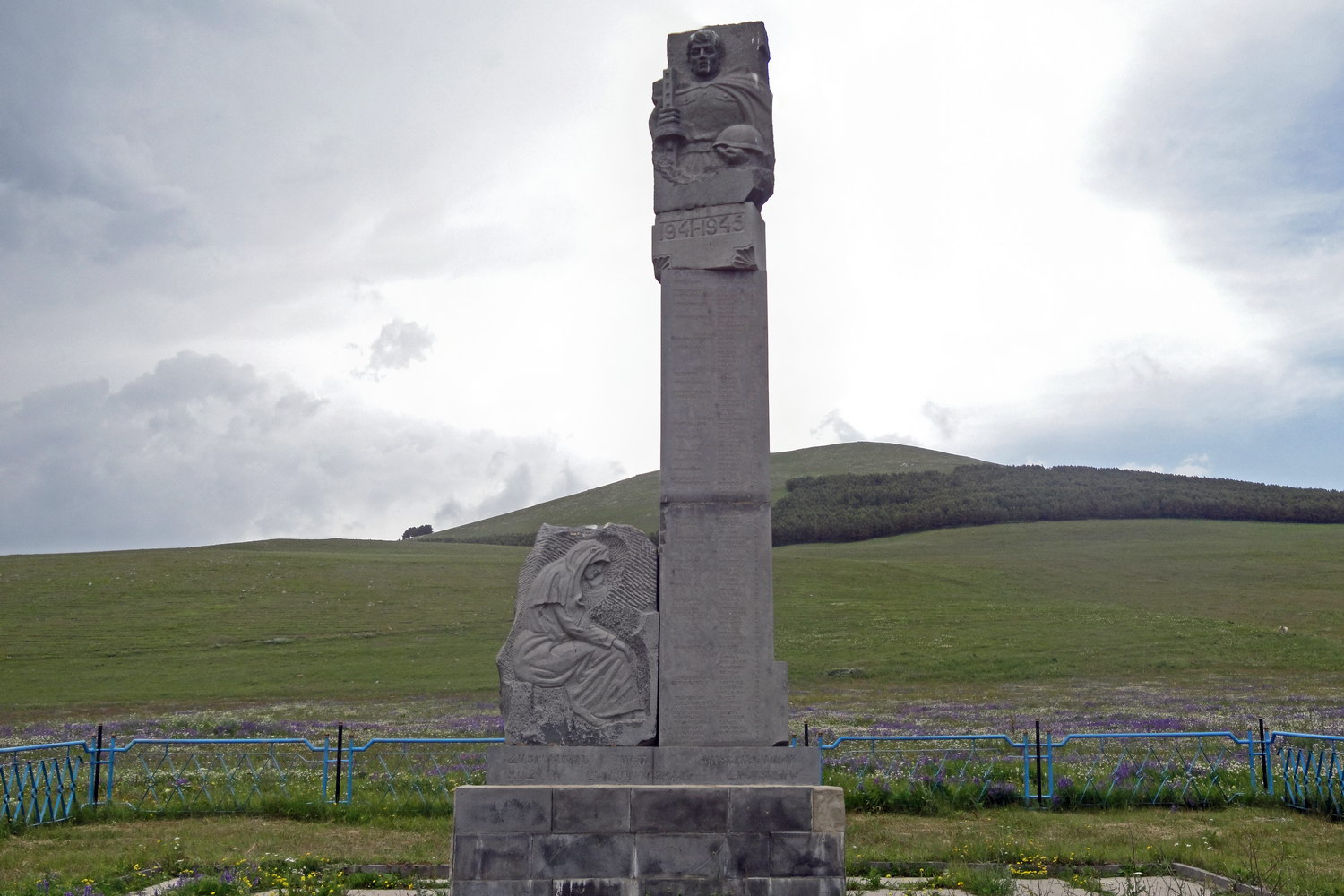
Memorial to the fallen World War II soldiers

== See also ==
- Aragatsotn Province
