= Aygezard =

Village in Ararat, Armenia

Aygezard Այգեզարդ
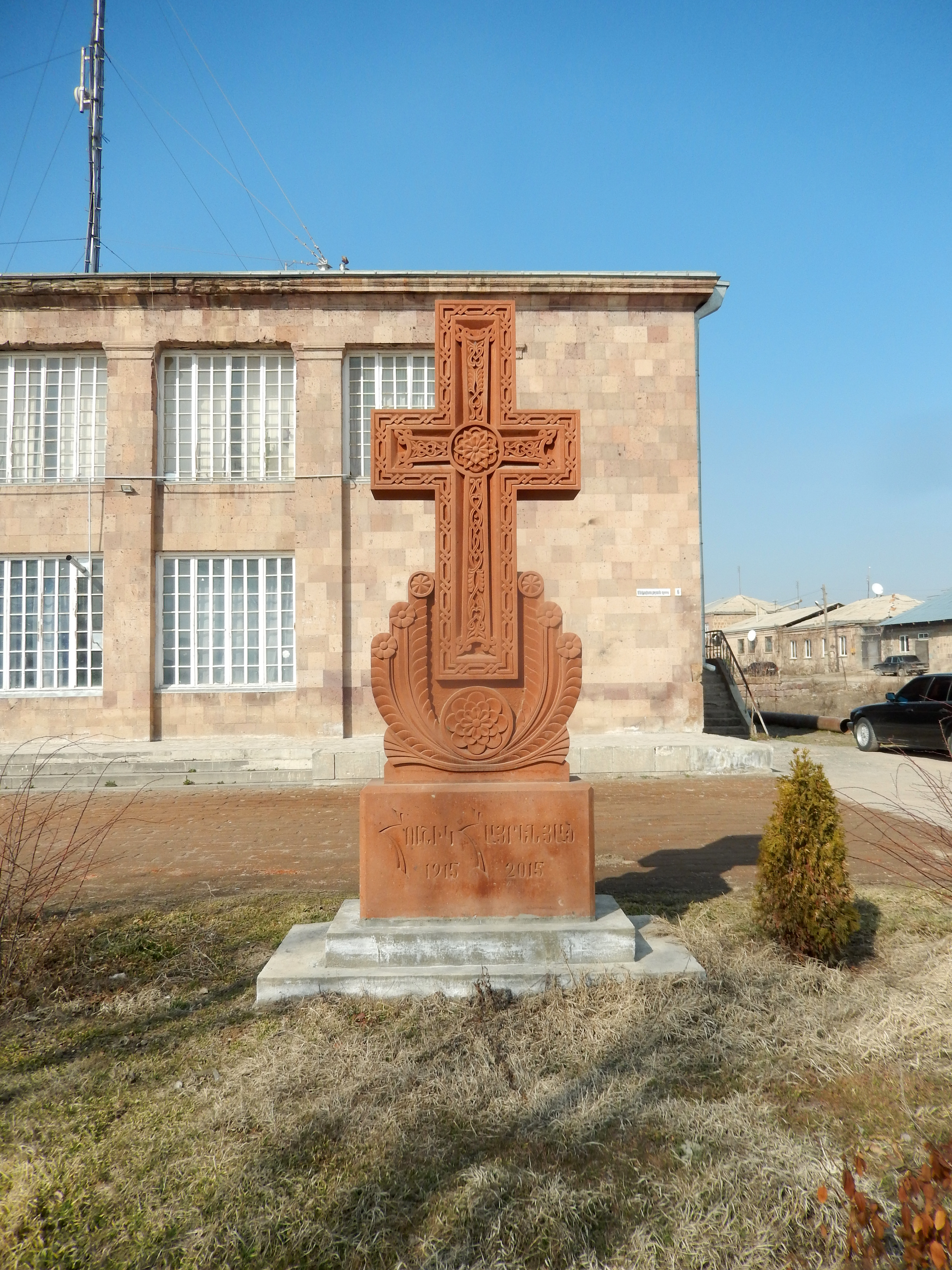
- Հուշարձան Այգեպատում, Արարատ

- Location within Armenia Location within Ararat
- Coordinates: 39°56′45″N 44°36′32″E
- Country: Armenia
- Province: Ararat
- Municipality: Artashat
- Elevation: 871 m (2,858 ft)

Population (2011)
  - Total: 2,994
- Time zone: UTC+4
  - Summer (DST): UTC+5

Aygezard (Armenian: Այգեզարդ) is a village in the Artashat Municipality of the Ararat Province of Armenia.

== Notable people ==
- Erdzhanik Avetisyan, Armenian-Russian Olympic sport shooter, specializing in the skeet shootings event.
