= Geghadir, Aragatsotn =

Geghadir Գեղադիր
- Location within Armenia Location within Aragatsotn
- Coordinates: 40°39′32″N 44°06′26″E
- Country: Armenia
- Province: Aragatsotn
- Municipality: Tsaghkahovit

Population (2011)
  - Total: 590
- Time zone: UTC+4
  - Summer (DST): UTC+5

Geghadir (Armenian: Գեղադիր) is a village in the Tsaghkahovit Municipality of the Aragatsotn Province of Armenia.
