= Aghin =

Aghin Աղին
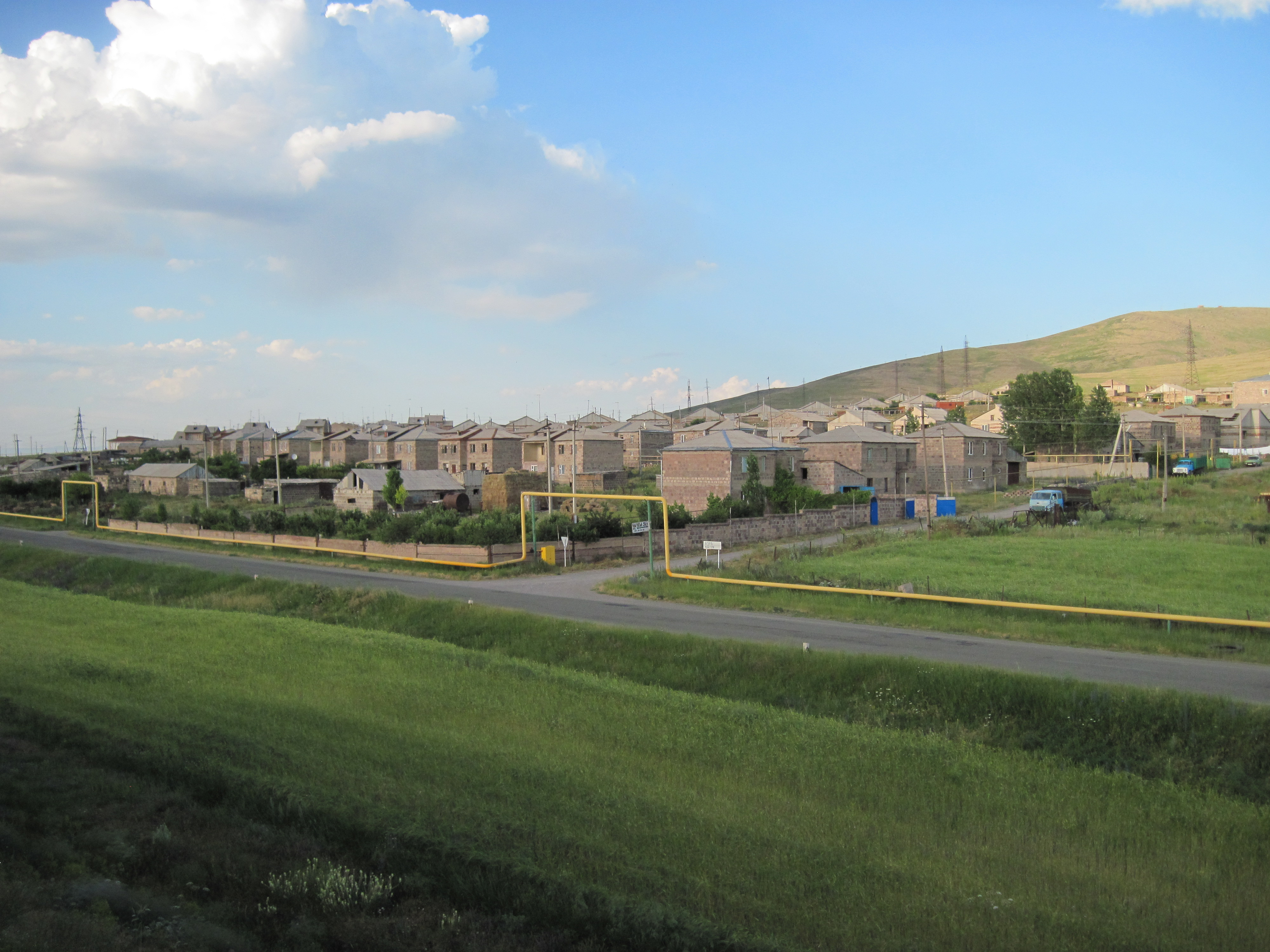
- Aghin

- Location within Armenia Location within Shirak
- Coordinates: 40°35′24″N 43°41′54″E
- Country: Armenia
- Province: Shirak
- Municipality: Ani
- Elevation: 1,479 m (4,852 ft)

Population (2011)
  - Total: 382
- Time zone: UTC+4
  - Summer (DST): UTC+5

Aghin (Armenian: Աղին) is a village in the Ani Municipality of the Shirak Province of Armenia, near the border of Turkey

== Demographics ==
The Statistical Committee of Armenia reported that the community's population was 598 in 2010, up from 547 at the 2001 census. The village of Aghin's population was 474 at the 2001 census.

Historical population
Year	Pop.	±% p.a.
1897	1,004	—
1926	443	−2.78%
1939	771	+4.35%
1959	612	−1.15%
1970	791	+2.36%
1979	359	−8.40%
2001	474	+1.27%
2011	382	−2.13%
