= Aygedzor, northern Syunik =

Aygedzor Այգեձոր
- Location within Armenia Location within Syunik Province
- Coordinates: 39°27′46″N 46°24′55″E
- Country: Armenia
- Marz (Province): Syunik
- Time zone: UTC+4 ( )
  - Summer (DST): UTC+5 ( )

Aygedzor (Armenian: Այգեձոր; formerly, Mugandzhug, Magandzhug, Magandzh, Maghanjugh, and Mughanjugh) is an abandoned town in the Syunik Province of Armenia.

== See also ==
- Syunik Province
