= Gevorg Jahukyan =

Armenian linguist

Gevorg Beglari Jahukyan (Armenian: Գևորգ Բեգլարի Ջահուկյան, April 1, 1920 – June 6, 2005) was an Armenian linguist and philologist.

== Biography ==
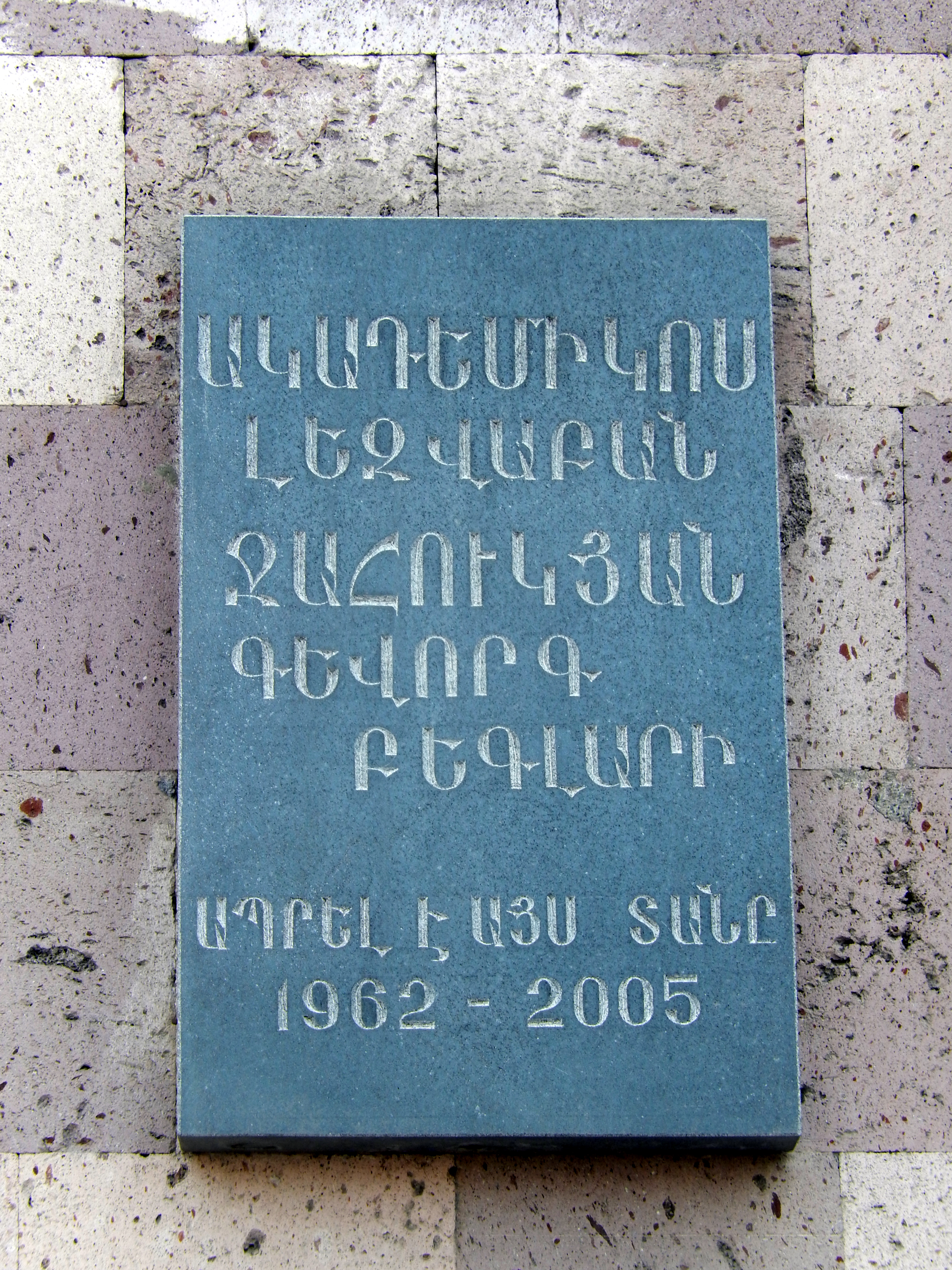
Memorial plaque on 4 Charents Street, Yerevan

He was born on April 1, 1920, in the village of Shahnazar (now Metsavan), now located in the Lori Province of Armenia. In 1941 he graduated from the Yerevan State University (YSU) Faculty of Philology. From 1941 to 1943 he served in the Second World War.

From 1945 to 1949 he was a senior lecturer at YSU Faculty of Philology. From 1948 to 1957 he was the Head of the Department of Foreign Languages. From 1957 to 1970 he was the Head of the Chair of Romance and Germanic Philology. From 1970 he was the Professor of the Chair of General Linguistics. From 1962 to the end of his life he was the Director of the Acharian Institute of Language and Chairman of the Professional Council of Linguistics of the Academy of Sciences of the Armenian SSR. His two-volume History of Linguistics (Yerevan, 1960-1962, 2015) and General and Armenian Linguistics (Yerevan, 1978) led to the idea of creating a common language model, which was laid out in the monograph General Theory of Language (Russian, Moscow, 1999, English, 2003). In 1988 he was awarded the State Prize of the Armenian SSR. He died in Yerevan on July 8, 2005. His bronze bust is placed in the lobby of main building of YSU, and one of the classrooms of the Faculty of Armenian Philology is named after him.
