= Heinrich Hübschmann =

German philologist (1848–1908)

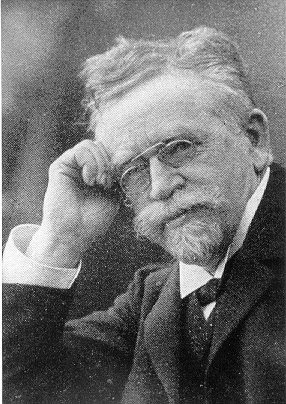
- Born: 1 July 1848; Erfurt, Prussia
- Died: 20 January 1908 (aged 59); Freiburg im Breisgau, German Empire
- Occupation: Philologist
- Known for: Research on the Armenian language

Johann Heinrich Hübschmann (1 July 1848 – 20 January 1908) was a German philologist and comparative linguist, best known for his pioneering work in Armenian and Iranian studies and for establishing Armenian as an independent branch of the Indo-European language family in 1875.

== Life ==
Hübschmann was born on 1 July 1848 in Erfurt into the family of a mill owner. Beginning in 1868, he studied philology at the University of Jena (under August Schleicher), the University of Tübingen, Leipzig University, and the Ludwig-Maximilians-Universität München, receiving his doctorate in February 1872. His dissertation, supervised by Martin Haug, examined Yasna 30 of the Avesta and was published as Ein zoroastrisches Lied (1872).

After further work on Avestan texts and on the grammar and etymology of Iranian languages, Hübschmann increasingly turned to Armenian studies. In 1874, he spent time at the Mechitarist monastery on the island of San Lazzaro degli Armeni in Venice, where he acquired a thorough knowledge of Armenian from the monks. The following year he published a German translation of Sebeos's History of Armenia, which served as his habilitation thesis and qualified him to lecture in Indo-Iranian languages at Leipzig University. He was appointed associate professor there in 1876.

From 1877 until his death, Hübschmann served as full professor of comparative philology at the University of Strasbourg (then the German Kaiser-Wilhelms-Universität), where he continued to work on both Armenian and Iranian linguistics.

Hübschmann died on 20 January 1908 in Freiburg im Breisgau. His grave is located in the Saint-Louis Cemetery in Strasbourg (La Robertsau).

== Research on the Armenian language ==
Hübschmann was the first to show in 1875 that the Armenian language was not a branch of the Iranian languages (earlier assumed so because of the immense amount of Iranian influence on Armenian throughout its history) but an entirely separate Indo-European branch in its own right. He used the comparative method to separate the Iranian loanwords, which make up the majority of the Armenian loanwords, from an older layer of native Armenian words.

His Etymologie und Lautlehre der ossetischen Sprache (1887) laid the foundations of Ossetic studies, establishing the Ossetian language as a distinct Iranian language and providing a systematic historical-phonological analysis based on etymological evidence.

== Works ==
- "Ueber die Stellung des Armenischen im Kreise der indogermanischen Sprachen" (1875)
- Armenische Studien (1883)
- Das indogermanische Vokalsystem (1885)
- Etymologie und Lautlehre der ossetischen Sprache (1887)
- Persische Studien (1895)
- Armenische Grammatik. I. Theil. Armenische Etymologie. I. Abtheilung: Die persischen und arabischen Lehnwörter im Altarmenischen. Leipzig, 1895
  - Armenische Grammatik. I. Theil. Armenische Etymologie (Bibliothek indogermanischer Grammatiken. Band VI), Leipzig, 1897
- Altarmenische Ortsnamen (1904)
