= Geghadzor =

Geghadzor Գեղաձոր
- Location within Armenia Location within Aragatsotn
- Coordinates: 40°37′58″N 44°10′23″E
- Country: Armenia
- Province: Aragatsotn
- Municipality: Tsaghkahovit

Population (2011)
  - Total: 1,223
- Time zone: UTC+4
  - Summer (DST): UTC+5

Geghadzor (Armenian: Գեղաձոր) is a village in the Tsaghkahovit Municipality of the Aragatsotn Province of Armenia.
