= Saint Astvatsatsin Church (Ramis) =

- Սուրբ Աստվածածին եկեղեցի
- Saint Astvatsatsin Church
- Location: Ramis
- Country: Azerbaijan
- Denomination: Armenian Apostolic Church

History
- Status: Destroyed
- Founded: 12th Century

Architecture
- Style: Basilica
- Demolished: 2000-2009

Saint Astvatsatsin Church, a destroyed Armenian Apostolic Church in the northwestern district of Ramis village of the Ordubad district of the Nakhchivan Autonomous Republic. As of the 1980s, the church was standing. The church was completely destroyed at some point between 2000 and 2009.

== History ==
It was located on a high ground the northwest district of Ramis village. The church was built in the 12th century. It was renovated in 1677-1678 under the patronage of Vardan, Navasard, Avetis and Anosh from Rams. Usta Murad was the renovation architect.

== Architecture and design ==
The church was built with basalt and granite, it had a three-nave basilica structure. The hall, apse and storage rooms were located in a single rectangular volume. There were two entrances: western and southern. The hall had two pairs of cross-cut gables and ended in a semicircular apse in the east. On both sides of the apse there were two-story storage rooms, the entrances to the second floor were hidden and were located in the alcoves of the first floor. The storage rooms on the first floor had almost square in plan.

The apse and the vestries of the church were illuminated from the eastern facade with one window each, and the hall with three rectangular windows with a fairly wide opening in the longitudinal and western walls. The windows of the western facade were placed higher than the windows of the longitudinal walls. The openings of the windows were covered with single-story horizontal bars and slightly widened inward.

The hall was divided into a medium large and two small naves by four thick gables and arches stretching between them. The vaulted arches rested on the pediments and masonry pediments.

In the 18th century, the interior was plastered for frescoes, which did not last a century, so in the 19th century, the interior of the church was again frescoed. In the apse of the church, on the front of the stage, icons were painted in frames with rectangular black borders, and the arches of the great nave, the dome of the apse and other parts were decorated with floral motifs. On the western wall of the hall, some of the flower decorations were painted in the form of bunches, placed in vases with canteres with images of birds.

== Cemetery ==
In front of the western entrance and the southern facade of the church, a cemetery of the 16th-18th centuries was preserved, where there were 16 (12 with inscriptions, but eroded in some places) cradle-shaped and quadrangular tombstones. Most of the tombstones were buried in the ground, and some were dislodged. The cemetery has been destroyed at some point between 2000 and 2009.
