= Hrachia Acharian =

Armenian linguist (1876–1953)

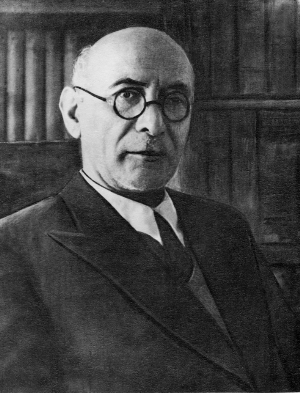
- Born: 20 March [O.S. 8 March] 1876; Constantinople, Ottoman Empire
- Died: 16 April 1953 (aged 77); Yerevan, Armenian SSR, Soviet Union
- Education: University of Paris; University of Strasbourg
- Occupations: Linguist, educator
- Known for: Adjarian's law

Signature
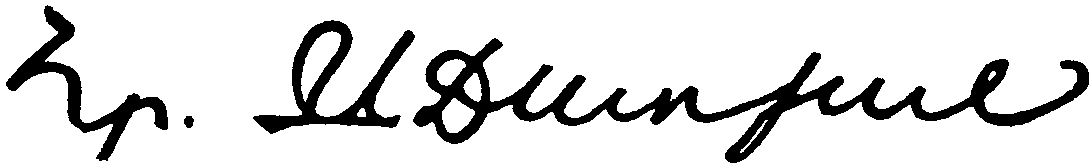

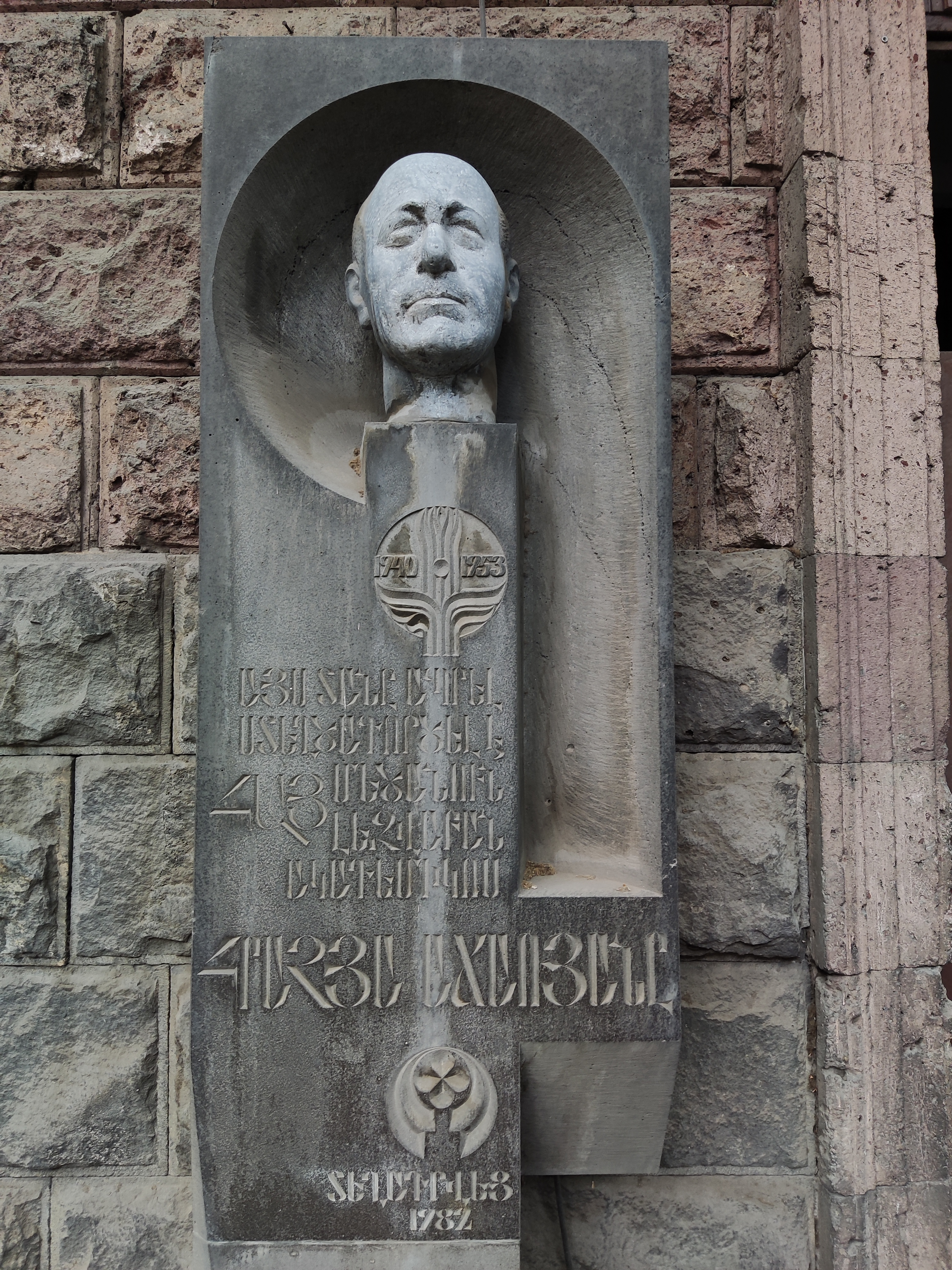
A plaque with a small sculpture at 43 Mashtots Avenue in Yerevan, where Acharian lived between 1940 and 1953.

Hrachia Acharian (Note: Also spelled Ajarian, Adjarian or Atcharian.) (Armenian: Հրաչեայ Աճառեան, reformed spelling: Հրաչյա Աճառյան; pronounced [həɾɑt͡ʃʰˈjɑ ɑt͡ʃɑrˈjɑn]; (Note: Western Armenian pronunciation: [ɑd͡ʒɑɾˈjɑn]) 8 March 1876 – 16 April 1953) was an Armenian linguist, lexicographer, etymologist, and philologist.

An Istanbul Armenian, Acharian studied at local Armenian schools and at the Sorbonne, under Antoine Meillet, and the University of Strasbourg, under Heinrich Hübschmann. He then taught in various Armenian communities in the Russian Empire and Iran before settling in the Armenian Soviet Socialist Republic in 1923, working at Yerevan State University until his death.

A polyglot, Acharian compiled several major dictionaries, including the monumental Armenian Etymological Dictionary, extensively studied Armenian dialects, compiled catalogs of Armenian manuscripts, and authored comprehensive studies on the history of Armenian language and alphabet. Acharian is considered the father of Armenian linguistics.

== Life ==
Acharian was born to Armenian parents in Constantinople (Istanbul) on 8 March 1876. He was blinded in one eye at an early age. His father, Hakob, was a shoemaker. He received initial education at the Aramian and Sahagian Schools in Samatya, then at the Getronagan (1889–93), where he learned French, Turkish, and Persian. He spoke the Constantinople (Istanbul) dialect of Armenian natively.

Upon graduation, he began teaching in Kadıköy, Constantinople, but in 1894 he moved to teach at the Sanasarian College in Erzurum. In 1895 he was accepted to the University of Paris (Sorbonne), where he studied under, among others, Antoine Meillet. In 1897 he became a member of the Société de Linguistique de Paris (Linguistic Society of Paris), where he presented a study on the Laz language. He then met Heinrich Hübschmann and transferred to the University of Strasbourg in 1898.

Acharian moved to Russian (Eastern) Armenia and began a teaching career at the Gevorgian Seminary in Ejmiatsin (1898–1902). He thereafter taught in Shushi (1902–04), Nor Bayazet (1906–07), Nor Nakhichevan (1907–19), and then to Iran: Tehran (1919–20) and Tabriz (1920–1923). He taught subjects ranging from Armenian, French, Turkish, Armenian history, and literature, to accounting. Besides teaching, he studied Armenian dialects wherever he resided.

In 1923, Acharian became one of the most prominent Armenian scholars who moved to Soviet Armenia from the diaspora. Acharian taught at Yerevan State University (YSU) from 1923 until his death in 1953. He mostly taught Persian and Arabic and in 1940 initiated the establishment of the Department of Oriental Philology/Oriental Languages and Literature at YSU.

Acharian knew numerous languages: Armenian (both modern and classical), French, English, Greek, Persian, Arabic, Turkish, Hebrew, Russian, German, Italian, Latin, Kurdish, Sanskrit, Sureth, Avestan, Laz, Georgian, Middle Persian (Pahlavi).

He was arrested on 29 September 1937, at the height of the Stalinist purges, on espionage charges. He was accused of being a spy for numerous foreign countries (Britain, Turkey) and being a member of a counter-revolutionary group of professors. He was released on 19 December 1939 due to lack of evidence.

Acharian became a founding member of the Armenian Academy of Sciences when it was established in 1943. He had been a Corresponding Member of the Czechoslovak Oriental Institute since 1937.

He died in Yerevan on 16 April 1953. He is buried at the Tokhmakh cemetery.

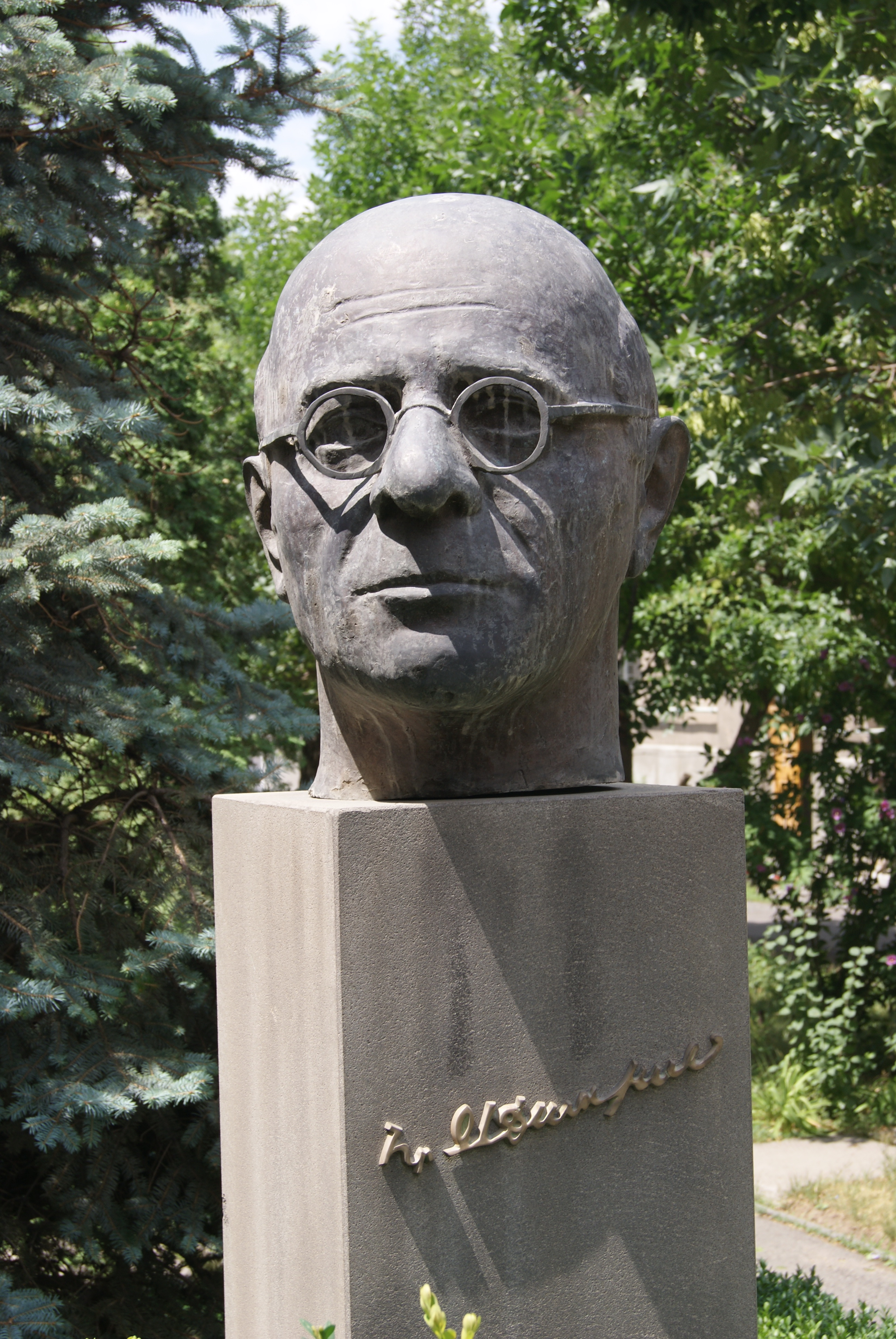
Acharian's bust in Yerevan

== Works ==
=== Armenian Etymological Dictionary ===
Acharian's most cited work is the Armenian Etymological Dictionary (Հայերէն արմատական բառարան, Hayerēn armatakan baṙaran). It was first published in Yerevan in seven volumes between 1926 and 1935 and includes some 11,000 entries on root words and 5,095 entries on the roots. The latter entries include early Armenian references, definitions, some 30 dialectal forms, and the borrowing of the word by other languages. Its second edition was published 1971-79 in four volumes.

It is widely considered a monumental work, that continues to be used as a reference work. Gevorg Jahukyan argued that it is the "best etymological dictionary" of Armenian. Antoine Meillet opined that no such perfect etymological dictionary exists in any other language. John A. C. Greppin has described it as "surely the most complete ever prepared for any language." Robert Dankoff praised it as a "monument of humanistic scholarship". Robert Godel described it as a "monumental, encyclopedic work, in which all Indo-European etymologies ever suggested for Armenian words are recorded and discussed, with the addition of many personal suggestions." Godel added, "As a dictionary of Armenian, Ajarian's work has a particular value, owing to his extensive knowledge of the classical literature as well as of the modern dialects."

R. T. Nielsen notes that it "retains much of its relevance to this day" and continues to be the "only near-complete historical treatment of the Armenian lexicon." Vrej Nersessian wrote in 1993 that despite "advances in Indo-European linguistics since 1926, the bulk of the etymologies cited are still valid." He ranked it "among the very best of etymological dictionaries." Hrach Martirosyan opined that "no serious etymological or dialectological investigation can be undertaken without recurring" to the dictionary. He noted, however, that since it was written in Armenian it is "inaccessible for many students of Indo-European linguistics." Nina G. Garsoian wrote in 1970 that it is "difficultly procurable" and noted that "not all of his etymologies have proved acceptable." James Clackson called it "excellent" but too noted that it is "not easily accessible to western scholars" as it is written in Armenian.

James R. Russell wrote that it "represents an important advance on the etymological researches" of Hübschmann, "adding greatly to our knowledge of Iranian in Armenian." At the same time, he noted that Acharian's entries are "often, however, uncritical compendia of all previous opinions, of uneven value." Patrick Considine noted that the "impressive size of the work is unfortunately in part due to the inclusion of a great deal of dead wood. It was, however, a very great achievement for a single scholar, and it contains much that is still of value." Rüdiger Schmitt is more critical, arguing that the dictionary is "unreliable as far as the Iranian evidence is concerned."

=== On Armenian dialects ===
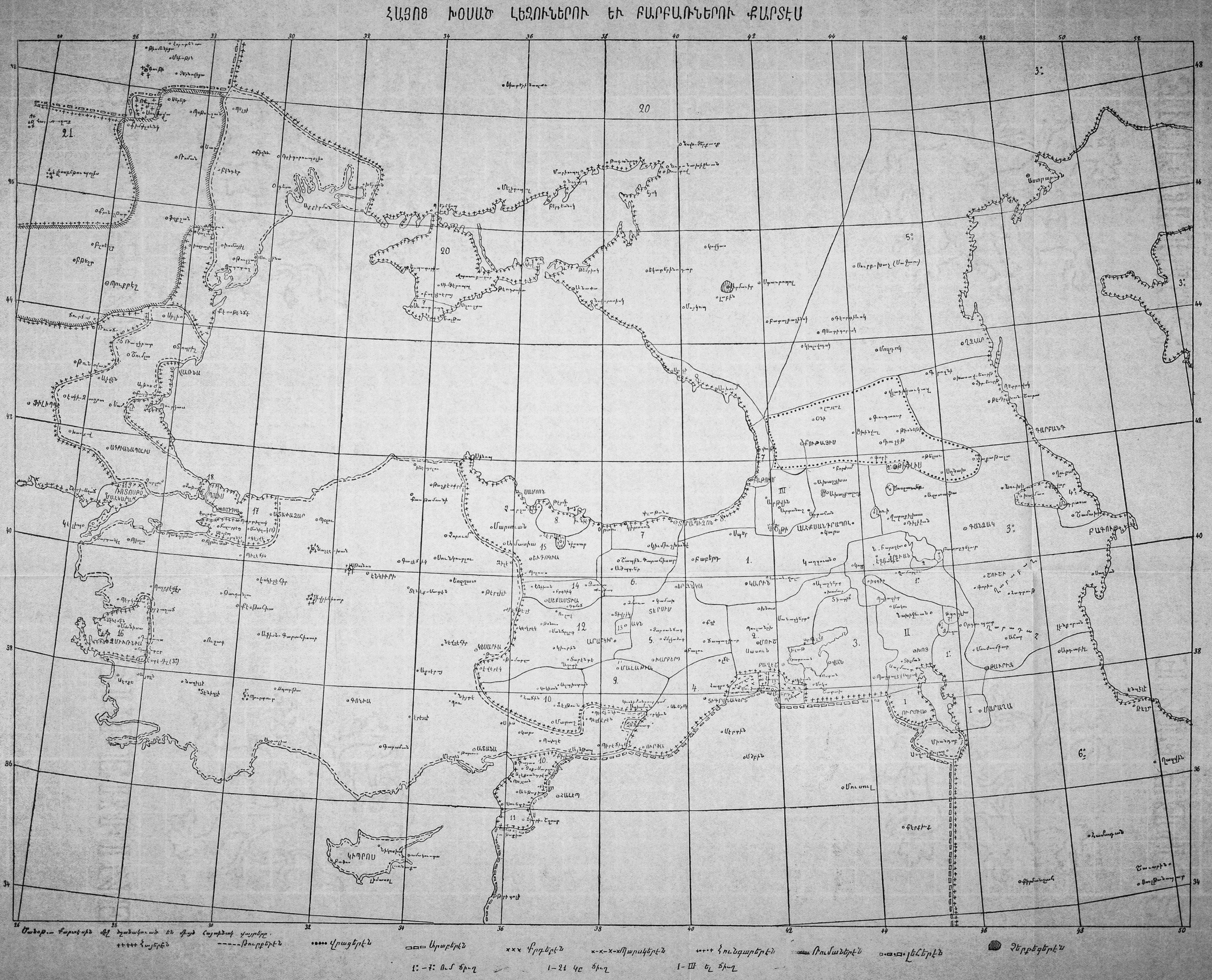
A map of Armenian dialects from Acharian's 1911 book.

In 1909 Acharian's first ever comprehensive study of Armenian dialects—Classification des dialectes arméniens ("Classification of Armenian Dialects")—was published in French in Paris. The publication was praised by Antoine Meillet. The Armenian edition (Հայ Բարբառագիտութիւն, Armenian Dialectal Studies) was published in 1911 with a map of the dialects. Acharian proposed a classification based on the present and imperfect indicative particles: -owm/-um (-ում) dialects, -kə/-gə (-կը) dialects, and -el (-ել) dialects. Abraham Terian wrote in 1997 that it has still not been surpassed by recent works. An English translation was published in 2024.

In 1913 the Lazarev Institute published his Armenian Dialectal Dictionary (Հայերէն գաւառական բառարան). It includes some 30,000 words used in Armenian dialects. His studies on various Armenian dialects have also been published in separate books. These include publications on the dialects of Nor Nakhichevan (1925), Maragha (1926–30), Agulis (1935), Nor Jugha (1940), Constantinople (1941), Hamshen (1940), Van (1952), and Ardeal/Transylvania (1953).

In 1902 he published the first ever study of Turkish loan words in Armenian.

=== Dictionary of Armenian Proper Names ===
Acharian authored a Dictionary of Armenian Proper Names (Հայոց անձնանունների բառարան), which was published in five volumes from 1942 to 1962. It includes all names mentioned in Armenian literature from the 5th to the 15th centuries with brief biographies and proper names common among Armenians thereafter.

=== Complete Grammar of the Armenian Language ===
Another monumental work by Acharian is the Complete Grammar of the Armenian Language, in Comparison with 562 Languages (Լիակատար քերականություն հայոց լեզվի՝ համեմատությամբ 562 լեզուների), published in six volumes from 1952 to 1971. A seventh volume was published in 2005.

=== Historical studies ===
Acharian authored several major works on history and historical linguistics. The History of the Armenian Language was published in two volumes in 1940 and 1951. It examines the origin and development of Armenian.

He also authored the most comprehensive study on the invention of the Armenian alphabet. Its first part, examining the historical sources, was published in 1907. The third part was published in Handes Amsorya in Vienna from 1910 to 1921 and then in a separate book in 1928. The first two parts, examining the historical sources and the life of Mesrop Mashtots were published in Eastern Armenian in 1968. The complete work was first published in 1984.

Acharian wrote a History of Modern Armenian Literature (Պատմութիւն հայոց նոր գրականութեան, 1906–12), History of the Turkish Armenian Question (Տաճկահայոց հարցի պատմութիւնը, 1915) covering the period from 1870 to 1915, The Role of the Armenians in the Ottoman Empire (1999), and the History of Armenian Diaspora (2002).

=== Manuscript catalogs ===
Acharian compiled catalogs of Armenian manuscripts kept at different locations. His catalog of the manuscripts at the Sanasarian College in Erzurum/Karin was published in Handes Amsorya in 1896-97. He later cataloged the Armenian manuscripts in Tabriz (1910), Nor Bayazet (1924), and Tehran (1936).

=== Other ===
Acharian translated the Bhagavad Gita from Sanskrit, which was published by the Armenian Church press in 1911. He wrote memoirs on Yervand Shahaziz (1917) and Srpouhi Dussap (1951).

== Recognition ==
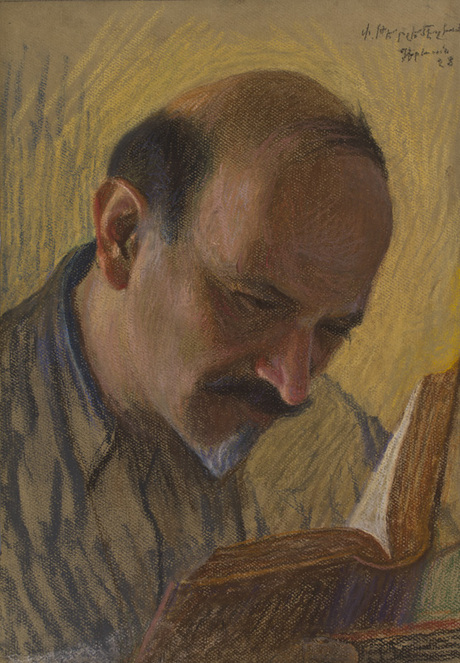
Panos Terlemezian's 1928 portrait of Acharian

Acharian is recognized as the father of Armenian linguistics by modern scholars and has been called an "undisputed authority" and the greatest Armenian linguist. By the 1940s Acharian had an international reputation greater than Nicholas Marr and Ivan Meshchaninov. Rouben Paul Adalian noted that he "single-handedly prepared the central scientific reference works on the Armenian language and, in so doing, vastly expanded modern knowledge and understanding of Armenian civilization through its entire course of development." Jos Weitenberg described him as the "most outstanding personality in Armenian linguistic research."

The Institute of Language of the National Academy of Sciences of Armenia is named after Acharian. His bronze bust stands at the central campus of Yerevan State University. A bust of Acharian was unveiled in Yerevan's Avan District in 2015. One of post-Soviet Armenia's earliest private universities, which operated from 1991 to 2012, was named after him.

Panos Terlemezian (1928) and Martiros Saryan (1943) painted portraits of Acharian and Ara Sargsyan created a plaquette in 1957/58.

== Bibliography ==
- Aghayan, E. B. (1976). "OA Portal in Armenia" Հրաչյա Աճառյան (Ծննդյան 100-ամյակի առթիվ). Patma-Banasirakan Handes (1): 43–60.
- Stepanian, G. Kh. (1959). Հրաչյա Աճառյան (1876-1953) [Hrachia Adjarian (1876-1953)]. Patma-Banasirakan Handes (2–3): 190–203. Archived from the original on 2 December 2020.
- Baloyan, Hrachya (2016). Ականավոր հայագետը (Հրաչյա Աճառյանի ծննդյան 140-ամյակի առթիվ) [The Eminent Armenologist (on the 140th birth anniversary of Hrachya Acharyan)]. Patma-Banasirakan Handes (2): 32–47. Archived from the original on 2 December 2020.
