= Commonitorium (Orientius) =

Work by bishop Orientius

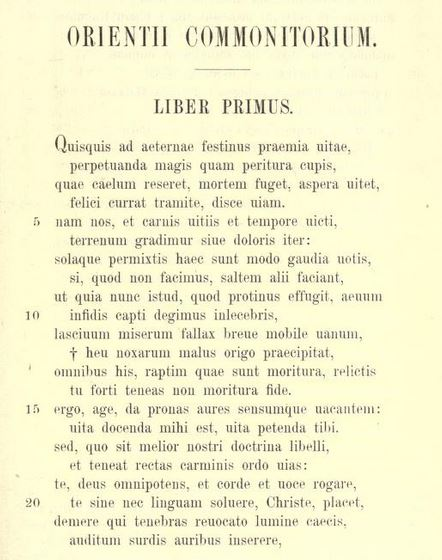
The first page of Orientius's Commonitorium, from Corpus Scriptorum Ecclesiasticorum Latinorum Vol. 16 (1888).

The Commonitorium (Classical Latin: [kɔmmɔnɪˈtoːrɪ.ũː], Ecclesiastical Latin: [kommoniˈtori.um]) (Note: According to philologist Pierre de Labriolle, the general Latin term commonitorium literally means "notes consigned to writing to aid the memory". The Episcopal priest Ian Markham translates the word more succinctly as "a reminder".) is a Latin poem composed by the Christian bishop Orientius around AD 430. Written in elegiac couplets, the Commonitorium is made up of 1036 verses and has traditionally been divided into two books (although there is reason to believe that the division is arbitrary). The poem is hortatory and didactic in nature, describing the way for the reader to attain salvation, with warnings about the evils of sin.

The Commonitorium was rediscovered near the turn of the seventeenth century at Anchin Abbey, and the editio princeps of the poem was published in 1600 by Martin Delrio. This version, however, lacked the second book, which was only discovered in 1791; the first complete edition of the poem was then published in 1700 by Edmond Martène. The poem has received qualified praise, with Mildred Dolores Tobin—who wrote a commentary on the poem in 1945—arguing that while it was not of the same quality as the poems of the Golden Age writers, it is a better work than other contemporary poems.

== Authorship and date ==
Not much is known about Orientius; he is mentioned in passing by Venantius Fortunatus in his Vita S. Martini, and a brief description of his life appears in the Acta Sanctorum. From what information is available, he was evidently a Gaul who had converted to Christianity after realizing that he had been living a sinful life. He eventually became the bishop of Augusta Ausciorum (what is modern day Auch, France). He devoted the remainder of his life to promoting Christian spirituality to his followers, and it is almost certain that the Commonitorium was the result of this devotion.

Given the paucity of information concerning Orientius himself, dating his poem has proven difficult, although there are several clues that have helped scholars construct a timeframe in which the Commonitorium was likely written and published. First, a short section in the poem's second book explicitly references the c. AD 406 invasion of Gaul by various barbarian tribes, suggesting that the poem was written sometime after this event. Second, the Vita S. Martini claims that when Orientius was near the end of his life, he was sent sometime in the mid-5th century by the Visigothic king Theodoric I (d. 451) to Roman commanders Flavius Aetius (d. 454) and Litorius (d. 439) to negotiate peace between Rome and the Visigoths. Given these reference points, Tobin suggests that the poem was likely written c. AD 430.

== Contents ==
=== Summary ===
The Commonitorium focuses mostly on morality, teaching one how to attain eternal salvation. The poem can be roughly divided into seven main sections: an introduction, a discussion of the "two-fold life of man", an explanation for why humans exist, a discussion on how to worship God, considerations for the reader, an exhortation on the importance of trinitarianism, and a conclusion. In the first section, the poet invites the reader to read the poem before calling upon God to offer guidance. In the second portion, the poet discusses the difference between the body and soul. In the third section, Orientius explains why humans were created. In the fourth section, the poet lays out the ways humans can love God: by "keeping [His] commandments" (namely, the Great Commandment), by believing in the resurrection of the dead, by praying for strength, and by avoiding sin. (Note: Orientius focuses much of this discussion on the seven deadly sins, a group which he argues includes: "wanton pleasure, envy, avarice, deceitful pleasure, lying, [and the] over-indulgence in food [and] drink".) In the fifth section, the poet considers a number of issues, including: sorrow, joy, death, judgement, eternal punishment, and the rewards awaiting in Heaven. In the penultimate portion of the poem, Orientius stresses the utmost importance of believing in the Trinity. The work then concludes with both a request that the reader pray for Orientius, as well as a blessing upon the reader.

The work today is divided into two books: one comprising the first 618 lines, and the other containing the remaining 418. Tobin, however, argues that "the poem is a unit and there is no suitable place for a divisions into books." She notes that the divide is somewhat arbitrary, as it bifurcates a discussion of the seven sins. She also argues that while there is an address to the reader that is traditionally thought of as the start to the second book, this need not be construed as a proper book opening. Tobin proposes that the divide in the poem was likely made due either to practical reasons (for instance, the entire poem might not have fit on a certain-sized manuscript roll) or because it was at this point that the poet stopped writing, only to take up the poem some time later.

=== Style ===
The Commonitorium, which is written in elegiac couplets, is a hortatory and didactic poem. While it is mostly of a "parenetic and protreptic character", the Latinist Johannes Schwind notes that it is also interjected with "occasional elements of diatribe and satire." When Orientius was writing, rhetoric was particularly popular, but the Commonitorium largely eschews this style and its associated devices, instead opting to focus on poetics.

The individual who Orientius most frequently imitates is the Augustan poet Virgil. Next comes the Imperial poet Ovid (whose influence according to Mildred Dolores Tobin "is only slightly less than ... Vergil"), followed by the Augustan lyric poet Horace. The Commonitorium also contains references, allusions, and borrowings from the Republican poets Lucretius and Catullus, as well as the Imperial epigrammist Martial and the Imperial satirist Juvenal. In terms of Christian poetic influence, Orientius frequently emulates Coelius Sedulius (fl. early 5th century AD) and possibly Prudentius (fl. late 4th century AD). And being a Christian work, the Commonitorium recalls the Bible both by referencing biblical stories, as well as by directly imitating the wording from the many books therein. It is likely that Orientius used the Vulgate translation of the Bible as his source, although some lines suggest that the poet may have also used the Vetus Latina.

== Textual history ==
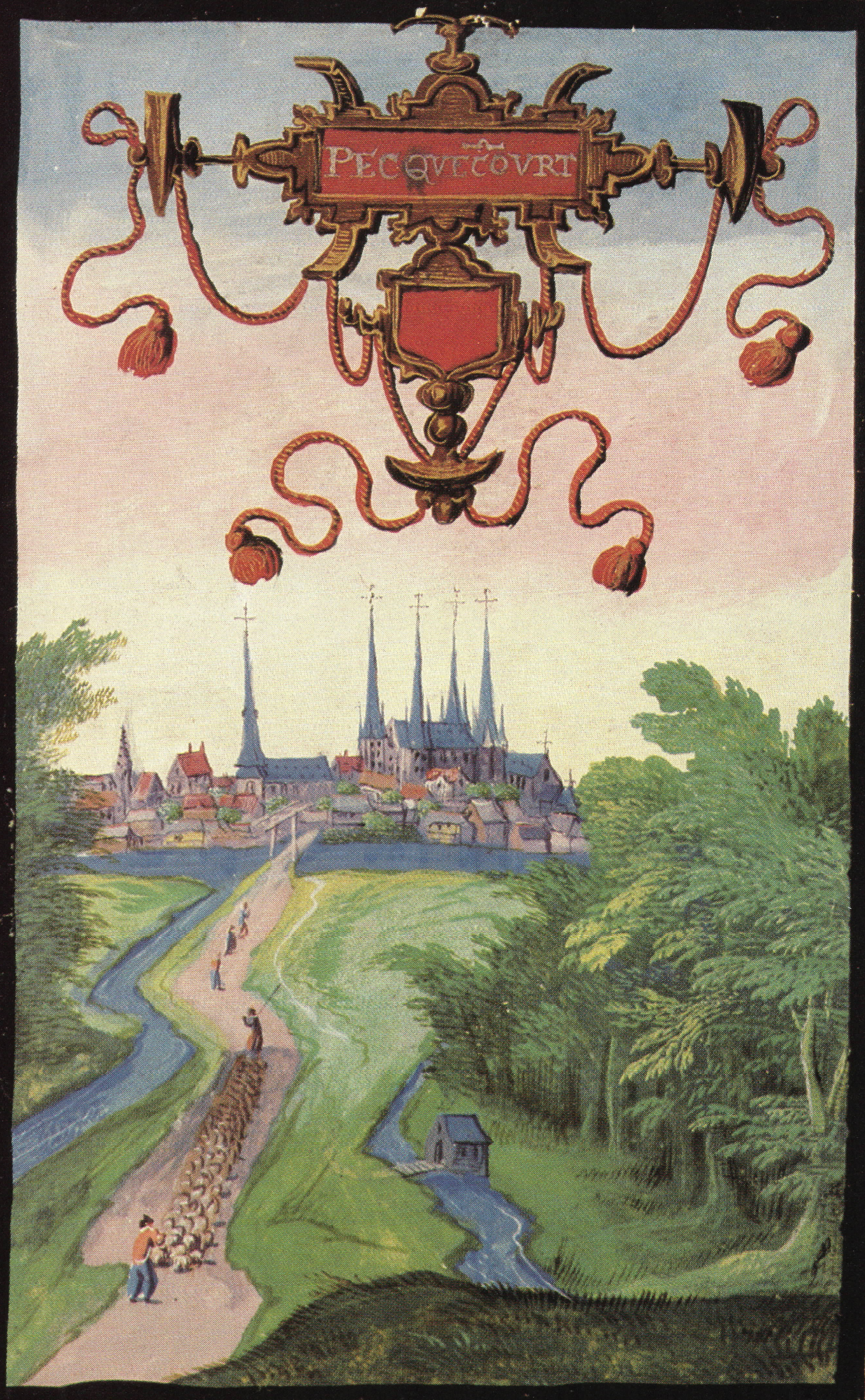
The Commonitorium was rediscovered at Anchin Abbey c. 1600.

The Commonitorium was lost sometime in the Middle Ages only to be rediscovered near the turn of the seventeenth century at Anchin Abbey in a manuscript known as the Codex Aquicinctensis. The finder of the poem, a Jesuit named Heribert Rosweyd, turned it over to his colleague, the theologian and Latinist Martin Delrio, who dubbed the work the Commonitorium and published the editio princeps of it in 1600; this edition was marred by the fact that Codex Aquicinctensis—and thus Delrio's version—preserved only the first book of the Commonitorium. Almost a century later in 1791, a second manuscript (the Codex Ashburnhamensis, also known as the Codex Turonensis) was discovered at Marmoutier Abbey, Tours that contained the Commonitorium's second book, thereby enabling the French Benedictine historian and liturgist Edmond Martène to publish the first complete edition of the poem in 1700. In 1774, the Italian Oratorian and patristic scholar Andrea Gallandi published a second complete edition of the poem. In 1888, the classicist Robinson Ellis published an edition of the work, which in 1911 Adrian Fortescue referred to as "the best modern edition".

In 1841, Guglielmo Libri Carucci dalla Sommaja stole the Codex Ashburnhamensis and sold it to Bertram Ashburnham, 4th Earl of Ashburnham (hence its common name), and today, the Commonitorium is preserved in only this manuscript, as the Codex Aquicinctensis was long ago lost. The Codex Aquicinctensis also contained two prayers and four short poems, all of which have been attributed to Orientius.

== Reception ==
Mildred Dolores Tobin, who wrote a commentary on the Commonitorium in 1945, argued that while Orientius's work was not of the same quality as the poems of the Golden Age writers, it "does approach nearer the standards set by the poets of that age than the majority of the Late Latin poetry." Ultimately, Tobin praises the poem for "its simplicity and its direct classical style." However, she qualifies her praise by pointing out that some of work's best portions are those that have been borrowed from classical authors, which weakens the overall impact of Orientius's work to some degree. A few years later, A. Hudson-Williams wrote that the poem's "language is in general clear and direct, though tinged here and there with turns of a decidedly late flavour."

== Bibliography ==
- De Labriolle, Pierre (2006) [1920]. History & Literature of Christ. London, UK: Kegan Paul. ISBN 9780710310675.
- Fielding, Ian (2014). "Physical Ruin and Spiritual Perfection in Fifth-Century Gaul: Orientius and His Contemporaries on the 'Landscape of the Soul'". Journal of Early Christian Studies. 22 (4): 569–585. doi:10.1353/earl.2014.0042. ISSN 1067-6341. S2CID 170193017.
- Fortescue, Adrian (1911). "Orientius". In Herbermann, Charles George (ed.). The Catholic Encyclopedia. New York City, NY: Robert Appleton Company – via New Advent.
- Hudson-Williams, A. (1949). "Notes on Orientius' Commonitorium". The Classical Quarterly. 43 (3/4): 130–37. doi:10.1017/S0009838800028111. S2CID 170489852.
- Markham, Ian (2017). Understanding Christian Doctrine. Hoboken, NJ: John Wiley & Sons. ISBN 9781118964750.
- Schwind, Johannes (2006). "Orientius". In Canicik, Hubert; Schneider, Helmuth (eds.). Brill's New Pauly. Leiden, Netherlands: Brill. doi:10.1163/1574-9347_bnp_e907920 – via BrillOnline Reference Works.
- Tobin, Mildred Dolores (1945). Orientii Commonitorium: A Commentary with an Introduction and Translation. Washington, D.C.: Catholic University of America Press.
