= Clément Huart =

French orientalist, publisher and translator (1854–1926)

- Born: Marie-Clément Imbault-Huart; 16 February 1854; Paris
- Died: 30 December 1926 (aged 72); Paris
- Occupations: Orientalist; Translator

Clément Huart (16 February 1854 – 30 December 1926) was a French orientalist, publisher and translator of Persian, Turkish and Arabic writings.

== Biography ==
The son of a lawyer, Clément Huart began studying Arabic at fourteen with Armand Caussin de Perceval. Graduated in Arabic, Persian, Turkish and modern Greek at the École des langues orientales, he continued his studies at the École pratique des hautes études, where he wrote his thesis, which was a translation of the Traité des termes relatifs à la description de la beauté by Chéref-Eddîn Râmi (Bibliothèque de l'EPHE, fasc. 25, 1875).

After he joined the Ministry of Foreign affairs, he was sent as a student-dragoman to the Consulate of France in Damascus (1875–1878) and was later consul in Istanbul (1878–1898). After the death of Charles Schefer (1898), he held the Chair of Persian at the École des langues orientales, where Henri Massé succeeded him (1886–1969). In 1908 he was appointed Director of Studies for Islam and the religions of Arabia at the EPHE.

In January 1919, he was elected a member of the Académie des Inscriptions et Belles-Lettres, of which he became president in 1927. He also was a member of the Société Asiatique (1898, vice-president 1916–1926) and of the Académie des sciences coloniales, president of the Société de linguistique (1903–1904, 1918) and of the Société d'ethnographie.

== Works ==
Letter by Huart (1909)

Favored by a good knowledge of European languages, the work of Clément Huart in the field of Arabic, Persian and Turkish studies were particularly appreciated in their time. According to his contemporaries, his personal preferences were in Arabic, and he knew Turkish better than Persian which he spoke with a Turkish accent.

Edward Granville Browne frequently mentioned him for his contributions to the study of Persian dialectology, linguistics and literary history, and noted in particular Huart's refusal to apply the term dari to Persian dialects which he rather included under the general heading of "Pahlavi Muslim" or "modern Median".

His works, little or no reissued today, are still of some interest, although partly outdated. Many of his contributions to the first edition of the Encyclopaedia of Islam were included in the second edition, sometimes revised and with a "further reading" section.

== Bibliography ==
- H. Blémont, "Huart (Marie-Clément Imbault-Huart dit)", in Roman d'Amat et al., Dictionnaire de biographie française XVII, 1986, cols. 1382-83.
- C. Meyer, "Imbault-Huart (Camille-Clément)", ibid., XVIII, 1989, cols. 147-48.
- P. Boyer, "Clément Huart (1854–1926)", article in Le Temps, Paris, 2 January 1927
- A. Cabaton, "Clément Huart", Comptes rendus de l'Académie des sciences coloniales, 8, 1926–27, (p. 553–555)
- J.-B. Chabot, "Funérailles de M. Clément Huart", Institut de France. Académie des Inscriptions et Belles Lettres, 1927, fasc. 1, (p. 1–3).
- E. Sénart, "Discours", in Journal asiatique, 1927/1, (p. 186–189).

== Works ==
- 1876: Mémoire sur la fin de la dynastie des Ilékhaniens, Journal asiatique, 7e sér., 8, (p. 316–366)
- 1879: La poésie religieuse des Nosaïris, in Journal asiatique, 7e sér., (p. 190–261)
- 1885: Les quatrains de Baba Tahir 'Uryan en pehlevi musulman, in Journal asiatique, 8e sér. (p. 502–545)
- 1889: La religion de Bab, Paris
- 1893: Le dialecte persan de Siwênd, in Journal asiatique, 9e sér., 1, (p. 241–265)
- 1899: Grammaire élémentaire de la langue persane, Paris, Librairie Ernest Leroux
- 1901: Histoire de Bagdad dans les temps modernes, Paris, Ernest Leroux
- 1902: Littérature arabe, Paris
- 1905: Inscriptions arabes et persanes des mosquées chinoises de K'ai-fong-fou et de Si-ngan-fou T'oung Pao, 2e sér., 6, (p. 261–320)
- 1908: Nouveaux quatrains de Baba Tahir 'Uryan', in Spiegel Memorial Volume, ed. J. J. Modi, Bombay, (p. 290–302)
- 1909: Selmân du Fârs, Mélanges Hartwig Derenbourg, Paris, (p. 297–310)
- 1912–1913: Histoire des Arabes, 2 vols., Paris
- 1916: Les légendes épiques de la région de Ghazna (Afghanistan), CRAIBL, 1916, (p. 579–587)
- 1918: Les derviches d'Asie mineure, CRAIBL, (p. 177–183)
- 1922: De la valeur historique des mémoires des derviches tourneurs, in Journal asiatique, sér. 11, 19, (p. 308–317)
- 1922: Les Ziyârides, Mémoires de l'Académie des inscriptions et belles lettres XLII, 1922
- 1925: La Perse antique et la civilisation iranienne, Paris, 1925
- 1943: L’Iran antique. Elam et Perse, et la civilisation iranienne, in collaboration with Louis Delaporte, Paris, Albin Michel
