= Antoine Meillet =

French linguist (1866–1936)

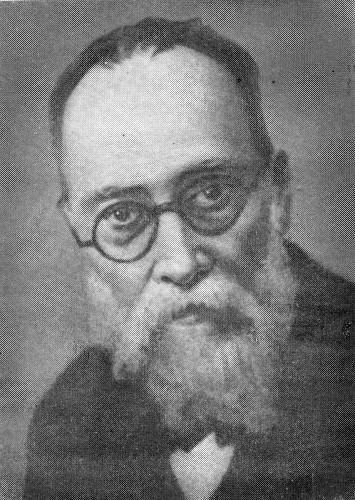
- Born: Paul Jules Antoine Meillet; 11 November 1866; Moulins, France
- Died: 21 September 1936 (aged 69); Châteaumeillant, France

Education
- Education: University of Paris

Philosophical work
- Institutions: Collège de France; Institut national des langues et civilisations orientales
- Main interests: Comparative linguistics; Armenian linguistics; philology
- Notable ideas: Epithets in Homer; Meillet's law; Meillet's principle

Paul Jules Antoine Meillet (French: [ɑ̃twan mɛjɛ]; 11 November 1866 – 21 September 1936) was one of the most important French linguists of the early 20th century. He began his studies at the Sorbonne University, where he was influenced by Michel Bréal, the Swiss linguist Ferdinand de Saussure, and the members of the L'Année sociologique. In 1890 he was part of a research trip to the Caucasus, where he studied the Armenian language. After his return, de Saussure had gone back to Geneva, so Meillet continued the series of lectures on comparative linguistics that de Saussure had given.

In 1897 Meillet completed his doctorate, Research on the Use of the Genitive-Accusative in Old Slavonic. In 1902 he took a chair in Armenian at the Institut national des langues et civilisations orientales and took under his wing Hrachia Adjarian, who would become the founder of modern Armenian dialectology. In 1905 Meillet was elected to the Collège de France, where he taught on the history and structure of Indo-European languages. One of his most-quoted statements is that "anyone wishing to hear how Indo-Europeans spoke should come and listen to a Lithuanian peasant." He worked closely with linguists Paul Pelliot and Robert Gauthiot.

Today Meillet is remembered as the mentor of an entire generation of linguists and philologists who would become central to French linguistics in the twentieth century, such as Émile Benveniste, Georges Dumézil, and André Martinet.

In 1921, with the help of linguists Paul Boyer and André Mazon, he founded the Revue des études slaves.

== Historical linguistics ==
Today, Meillet is known for his contribution to historical linguistics. He is notable for having coined and formalized the concept of grammaticalisation (influential but still controversial today) to denote what he viewed as the process of innovation by which autonomous words ended up as "grammatical agents". Subsequent to the further development and popularization of the concept by Jerzy Kuryłowicz and further development in the late 20th century, it would become a significant element of functionalist linguistics.

=== Homeric studies ===
At the Sorbonne, from 1924, Meillet supervised Milman Parry. In 1923, a year before Parry began his studies with Meillet, the latter wrote the following (which, in the first of his two French theses, Parry quotes):

Homeric epic is entirely composed of formulae handed down from poet to poet. An examination of any passage will quickly reveal that it is made up of lines and fragments of lines which are reproduced word for word in one or several other passages. Even those lines of which the parts happen not to recur in any other passage have the same formulaic character, and it is doubtless pure chance that they are not attested elsewhere.

Meillet offered the opinion that oral-formulaic composition might be a distinctive feature of orally transmitted epics (which the Iliad was said to be). He suggested to Parry that he observe the mechanics of a living oral tradition to confirm whether that suggestion was valid; he also introduced Parry to the Slovenian scholar Matija Murko, who had written extensively about the heroic epic tradition in Serbo-Croatian and particularly in Bosnia with the help of phonograph recordings. From Parry's resulting research in Bosnia, the records of which are now housed at Harvard University, he and his student Albert Lord revolutionized Homeric scholarship.

=== Language controversies ===
Meillet has been accused of meddling politics with his observation of languages. He had negative views on German and especially on Hungarian. Hungarian, he claimed, was too difficult a language full of loanwords and not capable of being a culture bearer (in a way that he claimed other Finno-Ugric languages were unable to become such). His views on Hungarian provoked a critical response from the Hungarian writer Dezső Kosztolányi.

== International languages ==
Meillet supported the use of an international auxiliary language. In his book La Ricerca della Lingua Perfetta nella Cultura Europea ('The Pursuit of the Perfect Language in the Culture of Europe'), Umberto Eco cites Meillet as saying: "Any kind of theoretical discussion is useless, Esperanto is functioning". In addition, Meillet was a consultant with the International Auxiliary Language Association, which presented Interlingua in 1951.

== Works ==
- 1902-05: Études sur l'étymologie et le vocabulaire du vieux slave. Paris, Bouillon.
- 1903: Esquisse d'une grammaire comparée de l'arménien classique.
- 1903: Introduction à l'étude comparative des langues indo-européennes.
- 1908: Les dialectes indo-européens.
- 1913: Aperçu d'une histoire de la langue grecque.
- 1913: Altarmenisches Elementarbuch.
- 1917: Caractères généraux des langues germaniques. (rev. edn. 1949)
- 1921: Linguistique historique et linguistique générale.
- 1923: Les origines indo-européennes des mètres grecs.
- 1924: Les langues du monde (co-editor with Marcel Cohen). (Collection linguistique, 16.) Paris: Champion. (2nd edn. 1952)
- 1924: Le slave commun
- 1928: Esquisse d'une histoire de la langue latine.
- 1925: La méthode comparative en linguistique historique. ('The comparative method in historical linguistics' translated by Gordon B. Ford Jr., 1966)
- 1932: Dictionnaire étymologique de la langue latine.

== See also ==
- Meillet's law
- Meillet's principle
- Pierre Chantraine
