= André Mirambel =

French linguist

- Born: 1 October 1900
- Died: 4 June 1970 (aged 69)
- Occupation: Hellenist

André Mirambel (1 October 1900 – 4 June 1970) was a 20th-century French Hellenist.

Agrégé of grammar, graduated from the Institut national des langues et civilisations orientales, André Mirambel was first a professor at the Institut français de Grèce (1925–1928) before he succeeded Jean Psichari from 1929 as professor of modern Greek at the École des langues orientales, of which he was administrator from 1958 to 1969 after he was Henri Massé's assistant since 1954. He was a member of the Académie des Inscriptions et Belles-Lettres since 1965.

In 1956, André Mirambel won the Prix Langlois awarded by the Académie Française for Tasso Tassoulo et autres nouvelles, by Thrasso Castonakis

== Bibliography ==
- 1948: Introduction au grec moderne G. P. Maisonneuve
- 1949: Grammaire du grec moderne, Klincksieck, ISBN 2252033819
- 1953: La littérature grecque moderne, Presses universitaires de France, coll. Que sais-je ?, N°. 560.
- 1959: La langue grecque moderne : description et analyse, Klincksieck
- 1960: Petit dictionnaire français-grec moderne et grec moderne-français Maisonneuve et Larose.
- 1962: La France devant l'hellénisme
- 1963: Georges Séféris. Prix Nobel 1963
