= Paul Boyer (Slavist) =

French linguist (1864-1949)

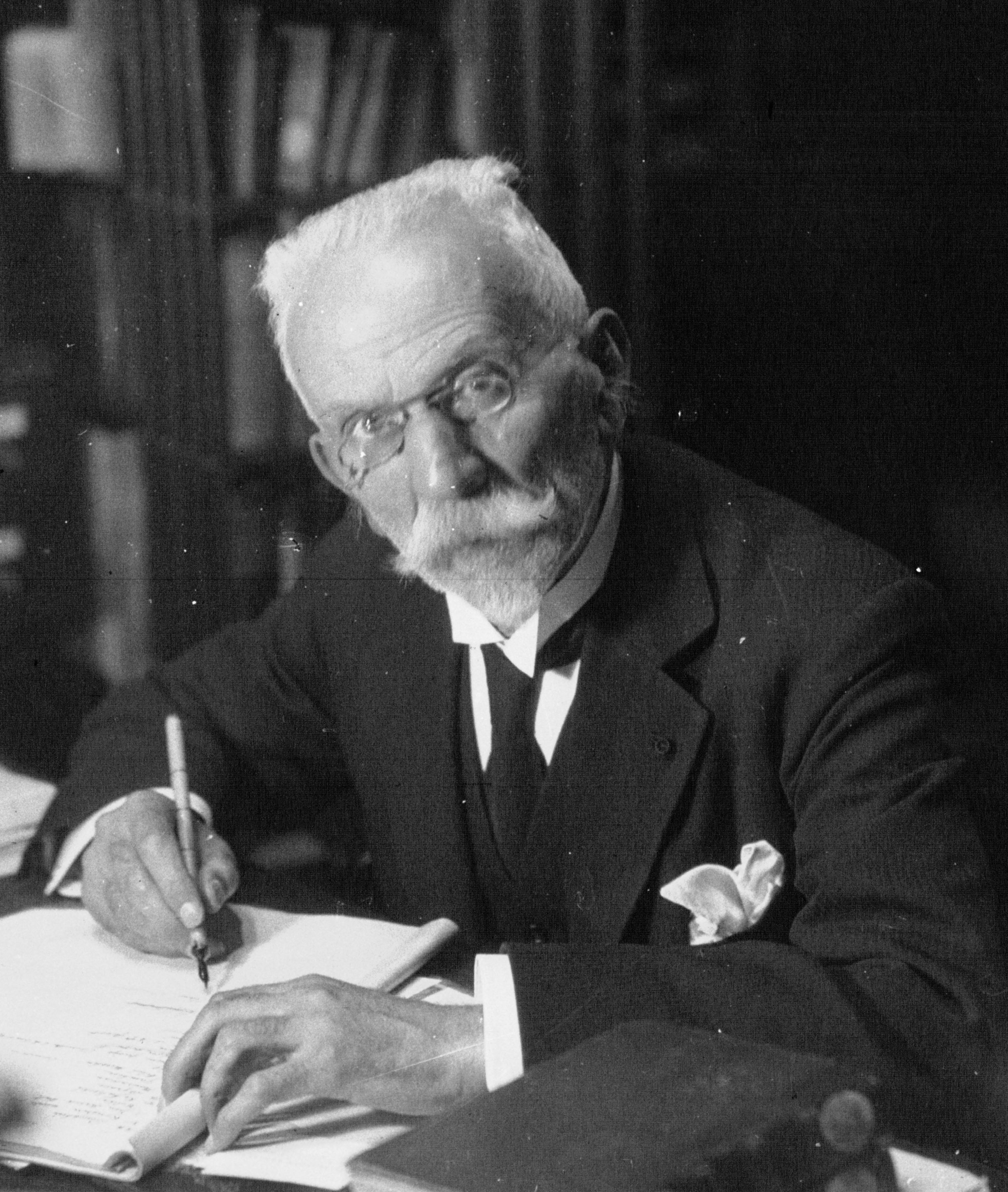
- Boyer in 1934
- Born: 1864; Cormery Centre-Val de Loire, French Empire
- Died: 1 October 1949 (aged 84–85); Paris, Ile-de-France, France
- Burial place: Paris, Ile-de-France, France

Paul Boyer (1864 – 1 October 1949) was a French slavist.

He inaugurated the chair of Russian language at the École des Langues orientales of Paris in 1891. Administrator of the school from 1908 to 1936, in 1921 he founded the Revue des études slaves with Antoine Meillet and André Mazon. The linguist Roger Bernard was among his students.

== Main publications ==
- Manuel pour l'étude de la langue russe, textes accentués, commentaire grammatical, remarques diverses en appendice, lexique, avec Nikolaï Vasilevitch Speranskiĭ, Armand Colin, Paris, 1905; 1935; 1951; 1957; 1967
- Chez Tolstoï, entretiens à Iasnaïa Poliana, Institut d'études slaves de l'Université de Paris, Paris, 1950
