= Jacques Legrand (Mongolist) =

French linguist and anthropologist

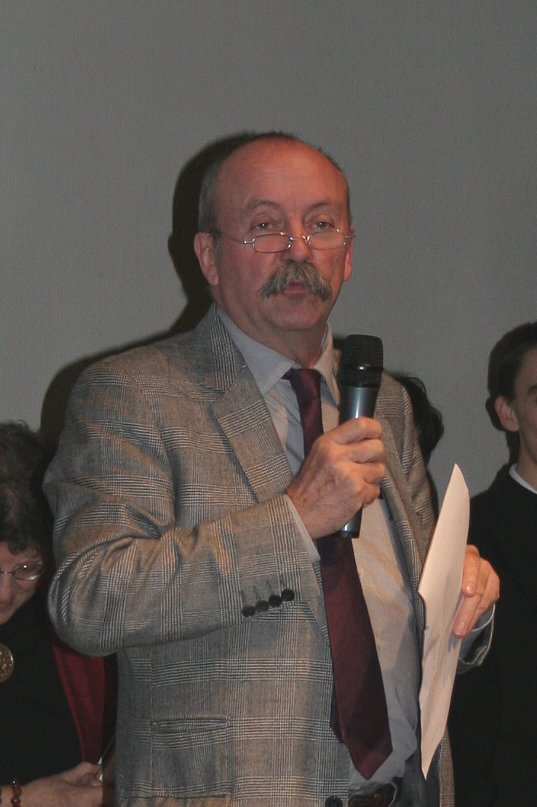
Jacques Legrand, pictured in 2007.

Jacques Legrand (born 29 June 1946) is a French linguist and anthropologist. He worked as a translator at the French embassies in Mongolia and China from 1967 to 1968. He specializes in Mongolian literature and history and the Mongolian language.

== Career ==
Legrand was born on 29 June 1946 in Rennes, Ille-et-Vilaine in western France. From 1967 to 1968, he worked as a translator at the French embassies in Mongolia and China. His return to France was followed closely by the establishment of the Mongolian language department at the Institut national des langues et civilisations orientales (then Centre Universitaire des Langues Orientales Vivantes) in 1970. He has been Professor of Mongolian Language and Literature there since 1989. He was an independent contractor and lecturer from 1971 to 1977, and a lecturer and senior lecturer from 1977 to 1989.

Jacques Legrand was President of the Institut national des langues et civilisations orientales from March 2005 for a term of 4 years. This mandate was renewed in March 2009 until March 2013.

From 1981 to 1989, he taught French as a Foreign Language at the University in Rouen. During this period, from 1986 to 1989, he taught the civilization of East Asia at the university, focusing primarily on the cultures and history of Mongolia, China and Japan.

Aside from his contributions to the understanding of Mongol language and literature, Legrand has conducted important research into the history of the Mongols, and the anthropology of Mongolian pastoralism. Legrand has studied Mongol life from the dawn of man, noting that the Neolithic saw the practice of agriculture, fishing and breeding, whilst the Bronze Age initiated an evolution in the direction of a more and more exclusive pastoralism in the Mongolian plains, creating some marked paradoxes as it evolved. He noted that the nomadic empires of the Asian steppes are "based on an essential contradiction", because although deriving from nomadic peoples' need for organization, these peoples did not have the resources to support an actual state.

He has published numerous publications under the auspices of UNESCO, and the International Institute for the Study of Nomadic Civilizations in Ulaanbaatar, which he chairs. In total he has written at least 70 publications as of 2009.

He has collaborated on numerous books, both scholarly publications and general works, and also on the film Urga, by Nikita Mikhalkov (1991).

On December 20, 2006, he visited Tamkang University (TKU) to discuss the possibility of academic exchange with French Department of Tamkang University and later visited the Carrie Chang Fine Arts Center and Chueh-sheng Memorial Library.

== Bibliography ==
- Jacques Legrand, Le choix mongol : de la féodalité au socialisme. Éditions sociales (1975), out of print
- Jacques Legrand, L'administration dans la domination sino-mandchoue en Mongolie Qalq-a (Mongolian version of Lifan-yuan zeli 理藩院), Mémoires de l'Institut des hautes études chinoises, vol. II, Collège de France, (1976)
- Jacques Legrand, La Mongolie (1976, coll. Que sais-je ?, out of print
- Jacques Legrand, Tsegmidijn Sükhbaatar, Dictionnaire mongol-français, L'Asiathèque, (1992)
- Jacques Legrand, Vents d'herbe et de feutre, Écrits et dits de Mongolie, Findakly, (1993)
- Jacques Legrand, Parlons mongol, L'Harmattan (1997)
- Jadwiga Karkucinska-Legrand, Jacques Legrand, Dictionnaire français-mongol, Monsudar, Ulaanbaatar, (2007)
