= Robinson Ellis =

English classical scholar (1834–1913)

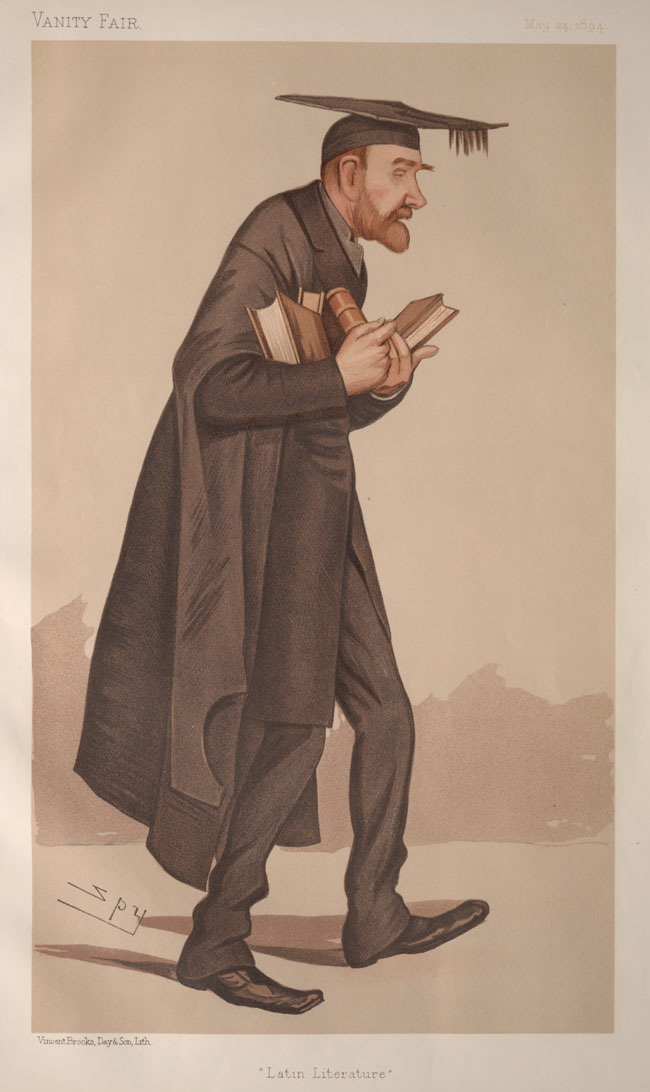
"Latin Literature". Caricature by Spy published in Vanity Fair in 1894.

Robinson Ellis, FBA (5 September 1834 – 9 October 1913) was an English classical scholar.

== Biography ==
Ellis was born at Barming, near Maidstone, and was educated at Elizabeth College, Guernsey, Rugby School, and Balliol College, Oxford. He took a First in Classical Moderations in 1854 and a First in Literae Humaniores ('Greats') in 1856. In 1858 he became fellow of Trinity College, Oxford, and in 1870 professor of Latin at University College London. In 1876 he returned to Oxford, where from 1883 to 1893 he held the university readership in Latin. In 1893 he succeeded Henry Nettleship as Corpus Professor of Latin.

His chief work was on Catullus, whom he began to study in 1859. In the course of his research he used an important early manuscript of Catullus, named the Codex Oxoniensis (many sources credit him with a discovery here, but that exact codex is already mentioned in an edition of Catullus made by Friedrich Wilhelm Doering in 1822). However, Ellis did not recognise the importance of that codex, and failed to consult it for his Commentary on Catullus (1876), thereby attracting criticism (Emil Baehrens first recognised the importance of the Oxoniensis and published his conclusions two years earlier, in 1874). In 1889 Ellis produced a second, enlarged edition, which resulted in its author's recognition as an authority on Catullus. Professor Ellis quoted largely from the early Italian commentators, maintaining that the land where the Renaissance originated had done more for scholarship than is commonly recognized. He supplemented his critical work by a translation (1871, dedicated to Alfred Tennyson), The Poems and Fragments of Catullus in the Metres of the Original.

Another author to whom Professor Ellis devoted many years' study was Manilius, the astrological poet. In 1891 he published Noctes Manilianae (Latin for "Manilian Nights"), a series of dissertations on the Astronomica, with emendations. He also treated Avianus, Velleius Paterculus and the Christian poet Orientius, whose poem Commonitorium he edited for the Vienna Corpus Scriptorum Ecclesiasticorum. He edited the Ibis of Ovid, the Aetna of the younger Lucilius, and contributed to the Anecdota Oxoniensia various unedited Bodleian and other manuscripts. In 1907 he published Appendix Vergiliana (an edition of the minor poems); in 1908 The Annalist Licinianus.

He is buried in St Sepulchre's Cemetery, Jericho, Oxford.
