= François de Labriolle =

French slavist (1926–2019)

François Champagne de Labriolle (17 February 1926 - 11 October 2019), was a French agrégé de grammaire and doctor in slavistics.

De Labriolle is an honorary professor of Russian language and literature at the Institut national des langues et civilisations orientales, of which he was vice president (1971–1986) then president (1986–1993). He has written and published on Russian literature and the Baltic republics (Estonia, Latvia, Lithuania)..

He is the son of Pierre de Labriolle, a professor at the Sorbonne, a member of the Institut de France, and father of French diplomat Jacques Champagne de Labriolle, graduated in Bantu languages from INALCO.

== Bibliography ==
- 1971: I. A. Krylov, les œuvres de jeunesse et les courants littéraires (Publications orientalistes de France)
- 1987: L’échec dans l’œuvre d’Ivan Goncharov, Éditions Mouton
- 1974: Le secret des trois cartes dans La Dame de pique de Pushkin, Canadian Slavonic Papers
- 1974: Grammaire russe de base, with Natalie Stepanoff-Kontchalovski, ISBN 978-2-85065-081-9, Éditeurs réunis
- 1999: La Lettonie (with Suzanne Champonnois), Éditions Karthala
- 2004: Estoniens, Lettons, Lituaniens : histoire et destins (with Suzanne Champonnois), Éditions Armeline, 2004 ISBN 2-910878-26-0
- 1997: L'Estonie : des Estes aux Estoniens (with Suzanne Champonnois), Éditions Karthala, coll. "Méridiens", 285 p. + 8 p. illustrations ISBN 2-86537-724-5
- 2001: Dictionnaire historique de la Lituanie (with Suzanne Champonnois), Brest, Éditions Armeline, 2001 ISBN 978-2-910878-17-7
- 2003: Dictionnaire historique de la Lettonie (with Suzanne Champonnois), Brest, Éditions Armeline, ISBN 978-2-910878-25-2
- 2005: Dictionnaire historique de l'Estonie (with Suzanne Champonnois), Brest, Éditions Armeline, 313 p. ISBN 2-910878-38-4
- 2007: La Lituanie : un millénaire d'histoire (with Suzanne Champonnois), Éditions L'Harmattan, ISBN 978-2-296-03312-2
