= André Guimbretière =

French Indologist (1923–2014)

André Guimbretière (1923–2014) was a French Indologist, professor of languages of Inda (Hindi, Urdu) at the Institut national des langues et civilisations orientales of which he was president from 1969 to 1971.

He was a specialist of Muhammad Iqbal.

== Publications ==
Related to the Indian world

- Le Problème du Cachemire, Orient, 1966
- Wilfred Cantwell Smith, (1916–2000), L'Islam dans le monde moderne [Islam in modern history], préface et traduction d'André Guimbretière, Éditions Payot, 1962
- Personnalisme théocentrique et vision motrice de la beauté chez Muhammad Iqbal : contribution à l'étude de « Wahdat al-Shuhud »
- Muhammad Iqbal, « La mosquée de Cordoue » (translated by André Guimbretière and Mohd. Hasan Askari), in Esprit, 1958
- Le Pakistan depuis la « Révolution pacifique » d´octobre 1958, Orient, vol. 34
- Histoire de l'Inde by Pierre Meile, 2nd edition updated by Jean-Luc Chambard and André Guimbretière, Presses universitaires de France, coll. Que sais-je ?, n° 489

Related to poetry

- 1949: Sans tambour... ni trompette, Regain, (preface by Luc Estang)
- 1953: Soleils, dieux amers, Imprimerie des poètes
- 1955: Concerto pour chanson et poésie, Delfica
- 1960: Le Passager de l'aube, Nouvelles Éditions Oswald,
- 1963: Vũ Hoàng Chương, Poèmes choisis (French version by Simone Kuhnen de La Cœuillerie, preface by André Guimbretière, Éditions Nguyen Khang, Sai Gon
- 1963: Aurore première, André Silvaire, La Rochelle
- 1966: Choix de textes de Roger Bodart, présentation by André Guimbretière, Éditions Seghers, (Poètes d'aujourd'hui, n° 157)
- Angèle Vannier (1917–1980), Le Sang des nuits, postface by André Guimbretière, Seghers, 1966
- 1973: Approche de l'espace vertiginal. À propos de « Traverser l'interdit » de Lucienne Hoyaux, Ottignies (Belgium)

== Bibliography ==
- Robert Sabatier, Histoire de la poésie française - Poésie du XX - Métamorphoses et Modernité, 1988 ISBN 978-2-226-29901-7.
