= Anatoly Khazanov =

Soviet-American anthropologist and historian

- Born: December 13, 1937 (age 88); Moscow
- Education: Moscow State University
- Known for: Contributions to nomadic studies; ethnicity and nationalism; and post-Soviet studies
- Scientific career
- Fields: Nomadic studies, sociocultural and historical anthropology
- Workplaces: University of Wisconsin, Madison

Anatoly Mikhailovich Khazanov (Russian: Анато́лий Миха́йлович Хазáнов, born December 13, 1937) is an anthropologist and historian.

Born in Moscow, Khazanov attended Moscow State University, where he received an M.A. in 1960. He earned a Ph.D. degree in 1966 and Dr.Sc. in 1976 from the USSR Academy of Sciences. In 1990, he became Professor of the Department of Anthropology at the University of Wisconsin, Madison; and at the moment he is the Ernest Gellner Professor of Anthropology (Emeritus). He is a Fellow of the British Academy, Corresponding Member of the UNESCO International Institute for the Study of Nomadic Civilizations, and Honorary Member of the Central Asian Studies Society; as well as the recipient of numerous grants and fellowships.

Anatoly M. Khazanov started his professional career as an archaeologist specializing in the nomadic cultures of the Early Iron Age. In the second half of the 1960s he shifted to socio-cultural anthropology. From 1966 to 1985, his main fields of research were pastoral nomads and the origins of complex societies. His main argument that the nomads were never autarkic and therefore in economic, cultural, and political respects were dependent on their relations with the sedentary world, is shared now by the majority of experts in the field. On the other hand, Khazanov was trying as much as was possible under Soviet censorship, to demonstrate the fallacy of the Soviet Marxist concept of historical process.

After his emigration in 1985 from the Soviet Union, Khazanov continued to study mobile pastoralists, paying particular attention to the role of nomads in world history and to the deficiences and shortcomings of their modernization process. He argued that various modernization projects have failed because they did not provide room for the sustained self-development of the pastoralists and denied their participation in decision-making.

Since the beginning of the 1990s, Khazanov has also become known for his contribution to the study of ethnicity and nationalism, and transitions from communist rule. He was one of the first to argue that in many countries this transition does not guarantee an emergence of liberal democratic order. He also argued that, contrary to widespread opinion, globalization per se is unable to reduce nationalism and ethnic strife, which will remain a salient phenomenon in the foreseeable future.

In the 2000s, Khazanov has also turned to the study of collective memory, collective representation, and other related issues; being particularly interested in their role in defining and redefining national and ethnic identities.

Khazanov has written 6 monographs and around 200 articles. These include Nomads and the Outside World (Cambridge University Press, 1984; 2nd Edition University of Wisconsin Press, 1994), which has been translated into several languages; Soviet Nationality Policy During Perestroika (Delphic, 1991), and After the U.S.S.R.: Ethnicity, Nationalism, and Politics in the Commonwealth of Independent States (University of Wisconsin Press, 1995). He has also edited or co-edited 10 volumes of papers, including Pastoralism in the Levant: Archaeological Materials in the Anthropological Perspective (Prehistory Press, 1992) with Ofer Bar-Yosef, Changing Nomads in a Changing World (Sussex Academic Press, 1998) with Joseph Ginat, Nomads in the Sedentary World (Curzon Press, 2001) with André Wink, Perpetrators, Accomplices, and Victims in Twentieth Century Politics: Reckoning with the Past (Routledge, 2009) with Stanley Payne, and Who Owns the Stock? Collective and Property Rights in Animals (Berghahn, 2012) with Günther Schlee.
