= EFAF =

EFAF may refer to:

- IFAF Europe
- École Française Anatole France
