= Emmanuelle Blatmann =

French diplomat (born 1970)

- Born: France
- Education: Paris-Sorbonne University Paris 1 Panthéon-Sorbonne University Institut national des langues et civilisations orientales
- Occupation: Diplomat
- Years active: 17

Emmanuelle Blatmann (born 18 August 1970) is a French diplomat. She is the current Ambassador of France to Nigeria.

== Education and career ==
Emmanuelle had a unilingual diploma in Oriental language and Civilisation from INALCO. She had her Magistère in International Relations and Action Abroad from Paris I and a master's degree in English from Paris IV.

She was Ambassador of France to Sudan from 2017 to 2021. In October 2021, she was appointed as the Ambassador of France.
