= Pierre Meile =

French linguist

Pierre Meile (23 February 1911 – 31 July 1963) was a French linguist. He was a professor of Indian languages at the Institut national des langues et civilisations orientales.

== Publications ==
- Bloch, Jules, 1963, Application de la cartographie à l'Histoire de l'Indo-Aryen, ouvrage [posthume] publié par C. Caillat et P. Meile, Cahiers de la Société Asiatique, N°XIII, Paris, Imprimerie Nationale.
- Meile, Pierre, 1941, « Les Yavanas dans l'Inde Tamoule », in Mélanges Asiatiques publiés par la Société Asiatique, Années 1940-1941, pp. 85-123, Librairie orientaliste Paul Geuthner, Paris.
- Meile, Pierre, 1945, Introduction au Tamoul, Librairie Orientale et Américaine, G.P. Maisonneuve, Paris.
- Meile, Pierre, 1945, « Sur la Sifflante en Dravidien », in Journal Asiatique, tome CCXXXIV, Années 1943-1945, pp. 73-89, Librairie orientaliste Paul Geuthner, Paris.
- Meile, Pierre, 1947, « Chap. I. Le milieu géographique » (§§ 1-50), « Chap. II, Les races » (§§ 51-66), « Chap. III. 3, Les langues modernes » (§§ 118-192), « Chap. VI.2, Les sources non sanskrites » (§§ 890-987), in Renou & Filliozat[1947].
- Meile, Pierre, ([1^{re} edition] 1950), « Gandhi ou la sagesse déchaînée », pp. v-xxxiv, in Gandhi, Autobiographie ou mes expériences de vérité, traduit d'après l'édition anglaise par Georges Belmont, Présentation et notes de Pierre Meile, Édition revue par Olivier Lacombe, Quadrige/PUF, 7^{e} édition «Quadrige»: 2003, juillet
- Meile, Pierre, ([1^{re} édition] 1951, [2^{e} édition] 1965), Histoire de l'Inde, 2^{e} édition, mise à jour par Jean-Luc Chambard, avec le concours d'André Guimbretière pour le Pakistan, collection Que sais-je? N°489, Presses universitaires de France, Paris.
- Renou et Fillozat, 1947, L’Inde classique : manuel des études indiennes / par Louis Renou et Jean Filliozat, Paris : Payot, 1947 [i.e. 1949]-53
- Renou et Fillozat, 1953, L’Inde classique : manuel des études indiennes / par Louis Renou et Jean Filliozat, Tome II avec de concours de Paul Demiéville, Olivier Lacombe [et] Pierre Meile, Paris : Imprimerie Nationale, 1953
