= Pierre Chantraine =

French linguist (1899–1974)

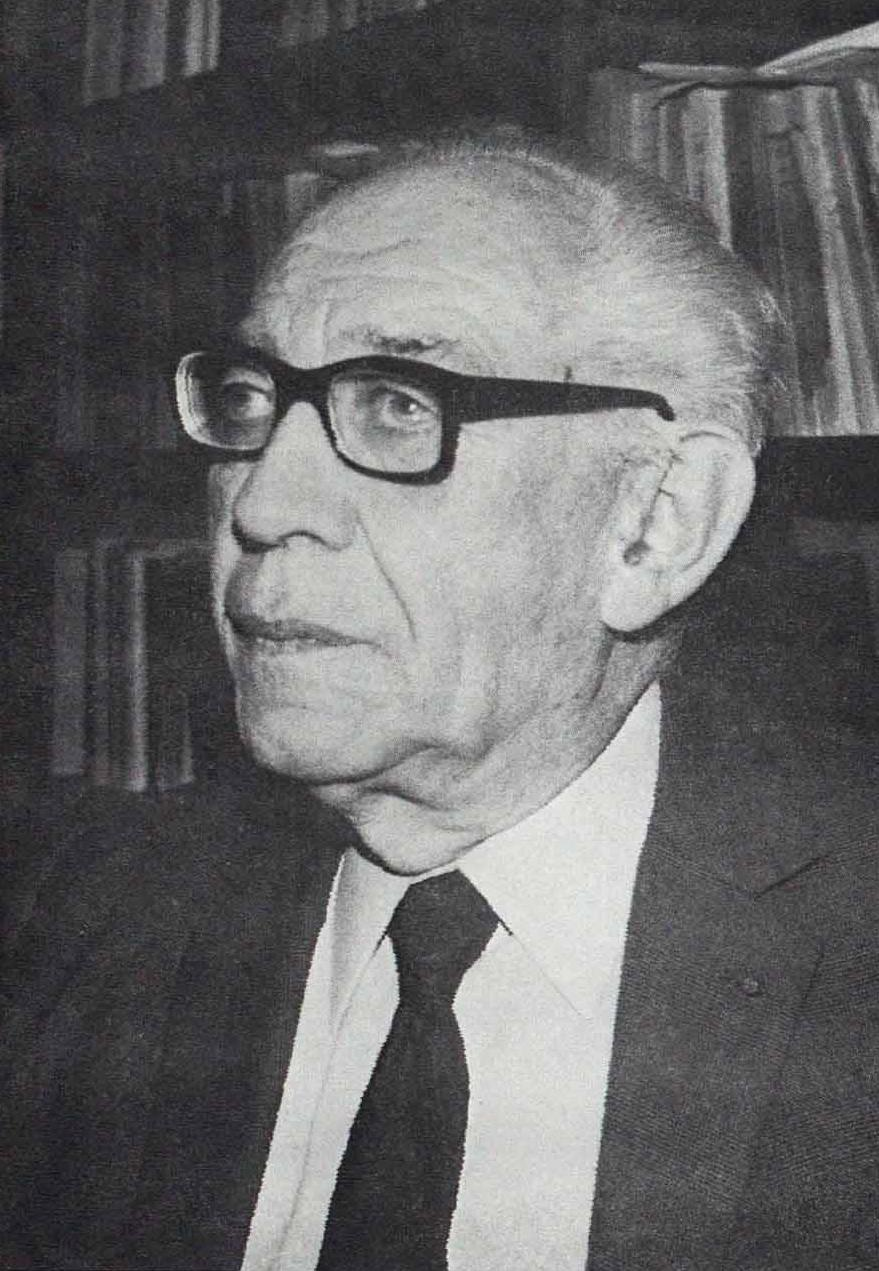
Pierre Chantraine in 1972

Pierre Louis Chantraine (French: [pjɛʁ ʃɑ̃tʁɛn]; 15 September 1899 – 30 June 1974) was a French linguist. He was born in Lille and died in Paris.

A student of, among others, Antoine Meillet, Joseph Vendryes and Paul Mazon, Chantraine became one of the most renowned authorities on Ancient Greek philology of his generation. After teaching at the University of Lyon between 1925 and 1928, he became Directeur d'études de philologie grecque ("Director of Greek Philology Studies") at the École pratique des hautes études in Paris, and also taught at the Sorbonne from 1938, continuing in both functions until his retirement in 1969. For the Collection des Universités de France, he edited and translated Xenophon (Oeconomicus) and Arrian (Indica). He was one of the first scholars to take serious note of Mycenaean Greek, after accepting the decipherment of Linear B by Michael Ventris and John Chadwick in 1952.

In 1953, he was elected a member of the Académie des Inscriptions et Belles-Lettres.

== Publications ==
- Histoire du parfait grec, 1926
- La Formation des noms en grec ancien, 1933
- Morphologie historique du grec, 1945, revised edition 1961
- Grammaire homérique, vol. 1 Phonétique et Morphologie, 1942, vol. 2 Syntaxe, 1953
- Dictionnaire étymologique de la langue grecque, 1968

== Sources ==
- Michel Lejeune: Notice sur la vie et travaux de M. Pierre Chantraine, membre de l'Académie, in: Comptes-rendus des séances de l'Académie des inscriptions et belles-lettres 1974, pp. 628–639
