= André Bourgey =

French geographer

André Bourgey (9 September 1936, Saint-Étienne) is a French geographer, a specialist of the Arab world.

== Biography ==
André Bourgey attended high school in Lyon and Algiers then graduated from Lyon University.

An agrégé in geography, he became a high school teacher for geography then an assistant in Lyon, before going to a post in Beirut (Centre d'étude et de recherche sur le Moyen-Orient contemporain - "Centre for Study and Research on Contemporary Middle East") where he sojourned from 1968 to 1983.

From 1983 until he retired, he taught the geography of the Middle East and North Africa at the Institut national des langues et civilisations orientales (INALCO or "Langues'O").

He was president of the INALCO from 1993 to 2001, director of the Institute of Arab and Islamic Studies (Paris III University) from 1989 to 1992, a member of the Board of the Arab World Institute (from 1993) and that of the Agence universitaire de la Francophonie from 1998 to 2001.
