= Jacques Champagne de Labriolle =

French diplomat

Jacques Champagne de Labriolle (born 4 May 1955) is a French diplomat who has served as France's Ambassador to Tanzania and Nigeria.

Champagne de Labriolle has a degree in modern languages with a specialisation in Swahili from the Institut national des langues et civilisations orientales, and founded the Centre for African Studies at the French Cultural Centre in Nairobi, Kenya, which he headed until 1978. He then entered the diplomatic service, serving in Ethiopia, Yemen, Oman, Lebanon, the United States, and as an advisor to the French President on African issues before being appointed Ambassador to Tanzania in 2007 and to Nigeria in December 2011.

In November 2014 he was appointed as a regional ambassador to the French regions of Pays de la Loire and Centre-Val de Loire. In June 2016 he became diplomatic advisor to Michel Delpuech, the Prefect of Auvergne-Rhône-Alpes.
