= Meillet's principle =

Reliability metric in linguistics

In historical and comparative linguistics, Meillet's principle (/meɪ.ˈjeɪz/ may-YAYZ), also known as the three-witness principle or three-language principle, states that apparent cognates must be attested in at least three different, non-contiguous daughter languages in order to be used in linguistic reconstruction. The principle is used to increase the likelihood that the features assigned to a proto-language are indeed ancestral in a family, rather than resulting from contact-induced convergence or from mere coincidence. The principle is named after the French linguist Antoine Meillet, who articulated the concept in 1903.

The principle has been extended to other aspects of reconstruction, including interpreting the original meaning of reconstructed forms and analyzing strictly linguistic evidence in ethnolinguistic contexts. Some linguists have argued that only two purported cognates may be necessary, provided that borrowings and linguistic innovation can be ruled out as possibilities for resemblance.

== History ==
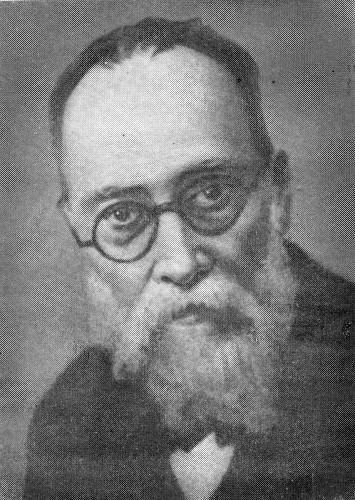
Antoine Meillet first proposed the principle in 1903.

In 1903, the French linguist Antoine Meillet published his Introduction à l'étude comparative des langues indo-européennes ('An Introduction to the Comparative Study of Indo-European Languages'). In it, he argued that any etymon purported to be part of the larger proto-language should be reconstructed only if there are at least three different reflexes in the daughter languages. Meillet viewed typological arguments for the relatedness of languages as extremely weak. He wrote:

Chinese and a language of Sudan or Dahomey such as Ewe [...] may both use short and generally monosyllabic words, make contrastive use of tone, and base their grammar on word order and the use of auxiliary words, but it does not follow from this that Chinese and Ewe are related, since the concrete detail of their forms does not coincide; only coincidence of the material means of expression is probative.

Meillet used this principle to articulate relationships found in grammatical or morphological features, or suppletive agreement. He believed that the strongest pieces of evidence for affinity were shared "local morphological peculiarities, anomalous forms, and arbitrary associations", which he referred to collectively as "shared aberrancy".

== Overview ==
Meillet's principle states that cognates – referred to as "witnesses" – must be attested in at least three different daughter languages before the word in the parent language can be reconstructed. The cognates must be non-contiguous; that is, none of the languages being used in the reconstruction may be descended from another language being used. A commonly cited example of suppletive agreement, a kind of shared aberrancy, is found in the copulae used across the Indo-European languages; even though the copulae in each of the individual Indo-European languages are irregular, the irregular forms are cognate with each other across the related language families. Relationships between cognates are often most stable in commonly used terms or expressions and this is also sometimes referred to as Meillet's principle since Meillet also identified this trend. Although the principle is commonly associated with Meillet, it has also been referred to as the three-witness principle or three-language principle.

=== Application ===
Alexandre François has applied a semantics-based form of the principle in his work on the Oceanic languages.

The use of Meillet's principle to identify linguistic affinity by analyzing grammatical features and shared suppletive agreement is standard practice in historical linguistics. Meillet's principle serves to assist comparative linguists in avoiding the conflation of taxonomic relationships with relationships in language contact or coincidence. The process also avoids the issues associated with phonological typology, since languages with strongly established cognates may not have cognates which are superficially similar phonologically. Examples of this include the word for 'five' in English, French (cinq), Russian (пять, pyat'), and Armenian (հինգ, hing); although none of these words sound like each other, all of them mean the same thing and are derived from the Proto-Indo-European word *penkʷe meaning 'five' as well.

Alexandre François has argued that the principle should also be applied to interpreting the original definition of the reconstructed form. For example, François suggests several definitions for the Proto-Oceanic word *tabu ('off-limits, forbidden, sacred due to fear or awe of spiritual forces') based only on the comparative evidence of semantic relations between other Oceanic languages. Other linguists, such as Lyle Campbell, have supported the principle's utility in identifying strictly linguistic relationships when other evidence – such as archeological or genetic – suggest that groups intermingled. Non-linguistic evidence may mislead linguists into thinking two languages are related, when two groups may have interacted significantly or shared similar cultural or biological features.

The original formulation has been subject to some criticism. Scott DeLancey and Henry M. Hoenigswald have both argued that two witnesses may be sufficient if borrowing and linguistic innovation can be ruled out. They argue that if neither of these exceptions apply, the only logical conclusion is that the shared feature must be descended from an earlier common parent language. DeLancey, however, admits that while "two witnesses make a case for reconstructing a feature to the proto-language [...] by Meillet's Principle, three witnesses constitute a conclusive case".

== See also ==
- Classification of the Indigenous languages of the Americas
- Classification of Thracian
- Linguistic typology
- Loanword § Linguistic classification
