= CESSMA =

French international research department

- Founded: 2014
- Type: Mixed Research Unit
- Purpose: Research in social sciences on Africa, South America, and Asia
- Location: Paris, France
- Method: Qualitative and quantitative research
- Key people: Gilles Guiheux
- Website: cessma.univ-paris-diderot.fr

The CESSMA - Centre d'études en sciences sociales sur les mondes africains, américains et asiatiques (Center for social studies on African, American and Asian worlds) is an interdisciplinary research unit based in Paris, France aggregating researchers and Ph.D. candidates from Paris Diderot University, INALCO, and IRD.

== History ==
The CESSMA was created in 2014 from the merger of three research units : the SEDET (transdisciplinary studies for developing societies) related to Paris Diderot University, the HSTM (history, societies and territories of the world), related to INALCO, and the DEVSOC (development and societies), related to IRD. The project was to combine the strengths of these three prime French research and academic institutes researching on Asia, Africa and South America to build a world-class centre for the comparative study of social dynamics in developing countries.

== Selected publications ==
- Véronique Dupont (ed.), The Politics of Slums in the Global South (Routledge, 2016)
- Bernard Hours, Pépita Ould Ahmed (ed.), An anthropological economy of debt (Routledge, 2015)
- Isabelle Guérin (ed.), Under Development Gender (Palgrave Macmillan, 2014)
