= Luc-Willy Deheuvels =

Luc-Willy Deheuvels is a French agrégé in the Arabic language, a university professor at the National Institute of Oriental Languages and Civilizations (INALCO), the director of the Research Center for the Middle East and the Mediterranean Sea (CERMOM), and the Chairman of the jury of the Arabic agrégation.

== Bibliography ==
- Manual of the modern Arabic language, published in two volumes, with two packs for these volumes, each one containing two audio cassettes ISBN 2-901795-63-3 (2 volumes) :
  - Manual of the modern Arabic language, Volume I (1 book + 2 audio cassettes package), by Luc-Willy Deheuvels, published in the collection of worlds and languages / at the National Institute of Oriental Languages and Civilizations / INALCO, “L'Asiathèque” (Asian Library), Paris, 1996 ISBN 2-901795-63-3 (vol. 1)
  - Manual of the modern Arabic language , Volume II (1 book + 2 audio cassettes package), by Luc-Willy Deheuvels, published in the collection of worlds and languages/at the National Institute of Oriental Languages and Civilizations / INALCO, “L'Asiathèque” (Asian Library), Paris, 1996 ISBN 2-901795-65-X (vol 2)
- Islam and contemporary thought in Algeria, in The Al-Assala magazine, 1971-1981; by Luc-Willy Deheuvels, the National Center for Scientific Research, CNRS Editions, 1991.
- Alchemy and structure of the imagination in the novel of "al-Sudd" (The Dam) of the Tunisian writer Mahmoud Messadi, by Luc-Willy Deheuvels, published in Words, symbols, myths: Mixes offered to Jamel Eddine Bencheikh, edited by Floréal Sanagustin.
- History and epic literary to the contemporary Algerian fundamentalist movements during the seventies , published in the Arabs and creative history, under the supervision of Dominique Chevallier, Publications of the University of Paris-Sorbonne, 1995.

=== Translations ===
- La quarantième pièce, (The other chambers) of Jabrâ Ibrâhîm Jabrâ (translated by Luc-Willy Deheuvels), published in a bilingual edition, Arabic and French in the collection of worlds and languages / at the National Institute of Oriental Languages and Civilizations / INALCO, “L'Asiathèque” (Asian Library), Paris, 1997, ISBN 2-911053-23-0
