= International Institute for the Study of Nomadic Civilizations =

Research institute based in Ulaanbaatar, Mongolia

International Institute for the Study of Nomadic Civilizations under the auspices of UNESCO
- ЮНЕСКО-ийн ивээл дор Нүүдлийн Соёл Иргэншлийг Судлах Олон Улсын Хүрээлэн
- Abbreviation: IISNC (НСИСОУХ)
- Established: September 16, 1998; 27 years ago
- Founded at: Ulaanbaatar, Mongolia
- Headquarters: Ulaanbaatar, Mongolia
- Region served: Asia and the Pacific
- Chairperson of academic council: Bumochir Dulam
- Director: Munkhtuul Chuluunbaatar
- Publication: Nomadic Studies; Intercultural Dialogue
- Affiliations: UNESCO
- Website: unesco-iisnc.org

The International Institute for the Study of Nomadic Civilizations (Mongolian: Нүүдлийн Соёл Иргэншлийг Судлах Олон Улсын Хүрээлэн) is a Mongolia-based research institute dedicated to the nomad studies. It was founded in 1998 under the auspices of the United Nations Educational, Scientific and Cultural Organization; and it is one of the UNESCO's Category 2 Institutes and Centres.

At present, Bumochir Dulam is serving as the chairperson of the IISNC's academic council and Munkhtuul Chuluunbaatar is serving as the director of the IISNC.

== Background ==
The IISNC was established on 16 September 1998 after the Indonesian, Kazakhstani, Kyrgyzstani, Mongolian and Turkish governments reached an agreement for its establishment at the initiative of UNESCO. On 16 September 1998, the IISNC's first general assembly session also took place. The International Association for Mongol Studies described the formation of IISNC as an "outcome of many-years long cooperation of Mongolian scientific institutions and academics with UNESCO in the area of Central Asian civilizations".

The IISNC was founded on the feasibility study by Jacques Legrand with two founding aims — "preserving the unique historical and cultural heritage of nomads" and "actively contributing to the development of appropriate elements of modernization for the continual improvement of nomadic life".

== Scientific activities ==
The researchers associated with the IISNC studies the present state and problems of nomadism in various regions of the world. The institute organizes international conferences and scientific research expeditions for studies on nomadism. Some of the institute's missions include studying the contribution of nomads to civilizations of the world; facilitating intercultural dialogues; preserving the nomadic culture and civilizations; advising the policymakers and politicians on the making and implementation of policies by providing them with scientific recommendations; creating an "interdisciplinary and integrated" research base for the study of nomadic and other civilizations to assist the research of scientists in related fields of study.

Noting that the IISNC organized an international symposium (Note: The symposium was titled "Dialogue Among Civilizations, Interaction Between Nomadic and Other Cultures of Central Asia". It was held from 15 to 16 August, 2001.) in Mongolia to promote dialogue among civilizations, Jargalsaikhan Enkhsaikhan stated that dialogue between civilizations is a fundamental requirement to prevent conflicts which, according to him, is one of the primary objectives of the United Nations. The UNESCO adopted dialogue among civilizations as an objective in its medium-term strategy for 2002–2007. From 9 to 14 August 2004, the IISNC organized a conference "Диалог Культур и Цивилизаций" (Dialogue between Cultures and Civilizations) in Ulaanbaatar. The conference drew the participation of scientists and politicians from numerous countries including China, France, Germany, India, Iran, Israel, Japan, Mongolia, Nepal, Russia, the UK and the US. At the conference, the present state and future of nomadism, and the ecological, economic, legal, political and sociocultural problems faced by the contemporary nomadic communities in different continents were discussed.

== Members ==
According to UNESCO, the IISNC has 34 associate and 143 corresponding members from 16 and 18 countries, respectively. The Russian Academy of Sciences is an associate member institute of the IISNC. The corresponding members of the institute includes Anatoly Khazanov and Thomas J. Barfield.

== Publications ==
The IISNC publishes a journal titled Intercultural Dialogue (ISSN 3005-3579) and a research bulletin titled Nomadic Studies (ISSN 2412-4222).
