= Auguste Carrière =

French linguist and grammarian (1838–1902)

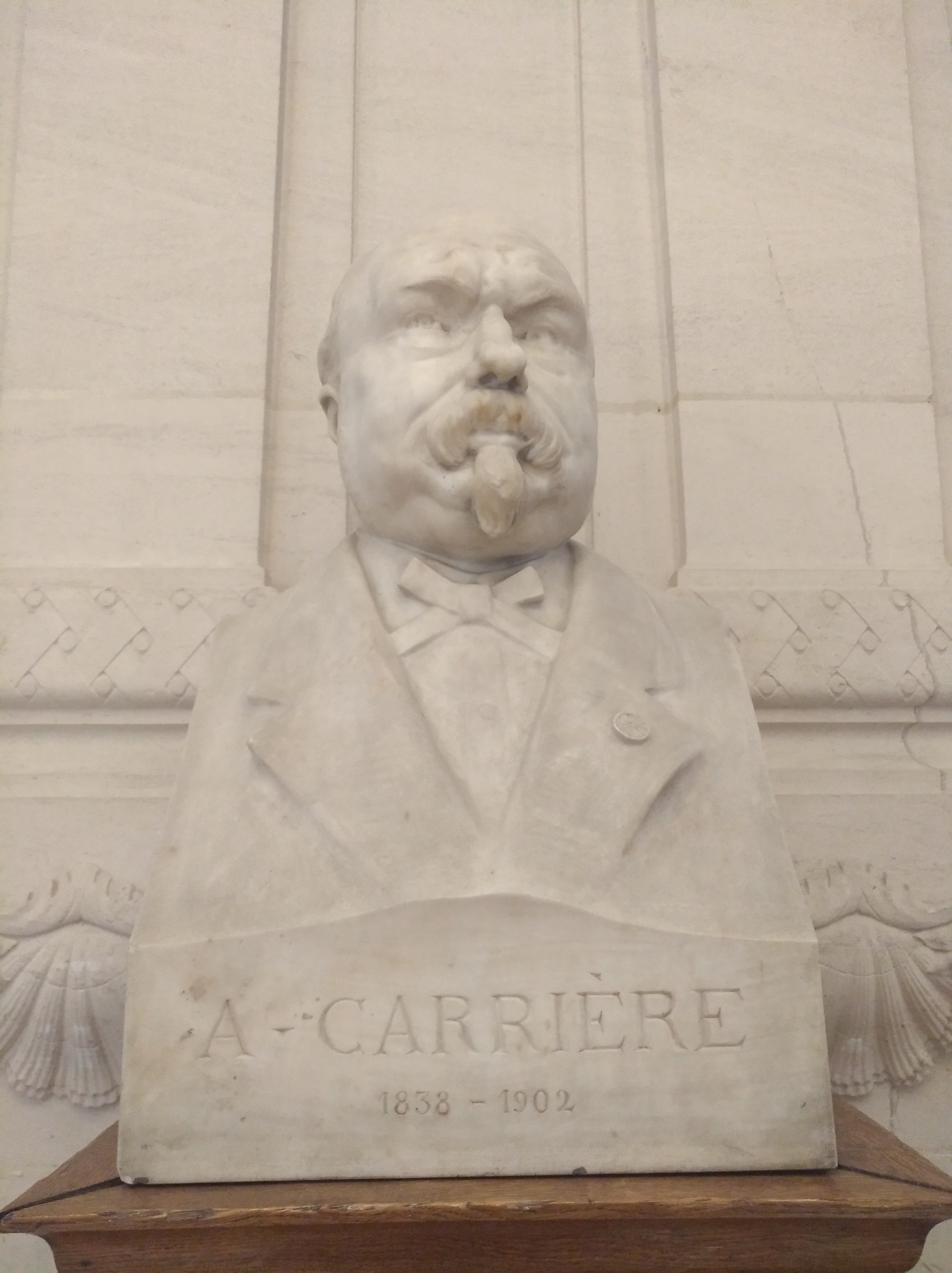
Bust of Auguste Carrière, in the Research Center of INALCO, in Paris

Auguste Carrière (19 August 1838 – 25 January 1902) was a French linguist, grammarian and historian, specializing in comparative grammar and Armenian culture. He was a professor at the Institut national des langues et civilisations orientales in Paris, and was an advocate of Armenian language studies, establishing an Armenian Chair at the school.

== Publications ==
- Grammaire arménienne (1883), édition corrigée et augmentée de celle de Max Lauer OCLC 23392048
- Un ancien glossaire latin-arménien (1886)
- Une version arménienne de l'histoire d'Asséneth (1886)
- La correspondance apocryphe de saint Paul et des Corinthiens, ancienne version latine et traduction du texte arménien (1891)
- Moïse de Khoren et les généalogies patriarcales (1891) OCLC 4682904
- Nouvelles sources de Moïse de Khoren : Études critiques (1893) OCLC 4682908
- La légende d'Abgar dans l' Histoire d'Arménie de Moïse de Khoren (1895) OCLC 252883907
- Les huit sanctuaires de l'Arménie païenne d'après Agathange et Moïse de Khoren, étude critique (1899).

== Bibliography ==
- Patrick Cabanel, « Auguste Carrière », in Patrick Cabanel et André Encrevé (dir.), Dictionnaire biographique des protestants français de 1787 à nos jours, tome 1 : A-C, Les Éditions de Paris Max Chaleil, Paris, 2015, p. 575-576 ISBN 978-2846211901
