= Orientius =

5th century Christian Latin poet

Saint Orientius

Martyr
- Died: 5th century Rome
- Venerated in: Roman Catholic Church
- Canonized: Pre-congregation
- Feast: 1 May

Orientius was a Christian Latin poet of the fifth century.

== Biography and work ==
He wrote the elegiac poem Commonitorium of 1036 verses (divided into two books) describing the way to heaven, with warnings against its hindrances. He was a Gaul (II, 184), who had been converted after a life of sin (I, 405 sq.), was evidently an experienced pastor, and wrote at a time when his country was being devastated by the invasion of barbarians.

All this points to his identification with Orientius, Bishop of Augusta Ausciorum (Auch), who as a very old man was sent by Theodoric I, King of the Goths, as ambassador to the Roman generals Flavius Aëtius and Litorius in 439 ("Vita S. Orientii" in "Acta SS.", I May, 61).

The Commonitorium quotes classical Roman poets —Virgil, Ovid, Catullus— and is perhaps influenced by Prudentius. It exists in only one manuscript (Cod. Ashburnham. sæc. X), and is followed by some shorter anonymous poems not by Orientius, and by two prayers in verse attributed to him.

The first complete edition was published by Martène, Veterum Scriptorum Monumenta, I (Rouen, 1700); then by Andrea Gallandi, Bibliotheca veterum Patrum, X (Venice, 1774), 185–96, reprinted by J.P. Migne in Patrologia Latina 61.977-1006. The best modern edition is by Ellis in the Corpus Scriptorum Eccl. Latinorum XVI (Vienna, 1888): "Poetæ Christiani minores", I, 191–261.
