= Anne Louyot =

Ambassador of France to Armenia

Ambassador of France to Armenia
- President: Emmanuel Macron
- Preceded by: Jonathan Lacôte

Personal details
- Born: 1963 Metz, France
- Occupation: diplomat

Anne Louyot is a French diplomat who currently serves as Ambassador Extraordinary and Plenipotentiary of France to Armenia.

== Biography ==
Before her career in Armenia, Anne Louyot worked in French consular missions in Spain, Colombia and Brazil. In April 2021, she takes the decision to close the Institut français of Valencia. She was appointed Ambassador of France to Armenia in August 2021, replacing her predecessor Jonathan Lacôte. In September she presented her credentials to Foreign Minister of Armenia Ararat Mirzoyan and President of Armenia Armen Sargsyan. In her interview to CivilNet she stated her mission as "standing side by side with Armenia looking into its future".
