= Nicole Vandier-Nicolas =

French sinologist and philosopher (1906 – 1987)

Nicole Vandier-Nicolas

Nicole Vandier-Nicolas (24 July 1906 – 1 March 1987), also known as Nicole Nicolas, was a French sinologist, professor and philosopher. She was specialized in Chinese art and Buddhism. She was the “first to suggest the connection between the verse written on the one side of the scroll and the pictures on the other side.”

== Biography ==
Nicole Vandier-Nicolas was born as Alberte Émilie Marie Nicole Zoé Vandier on 24 July 1906 in Paris, France. She was a professor of Chinese civilization at the National Institute for Oriental Languages and Civilizations. She also taught the subject of Chinese art at the École du Louvre. She translated a number of literary works from Chinese to French.

She died on 1 March 1987 in Marcilly-d'Azergues, France.
