= Lycée Français Anatole France =

- Անատոլ Ֆրանսի անվան Ֆրանսիական կրթահամալիր

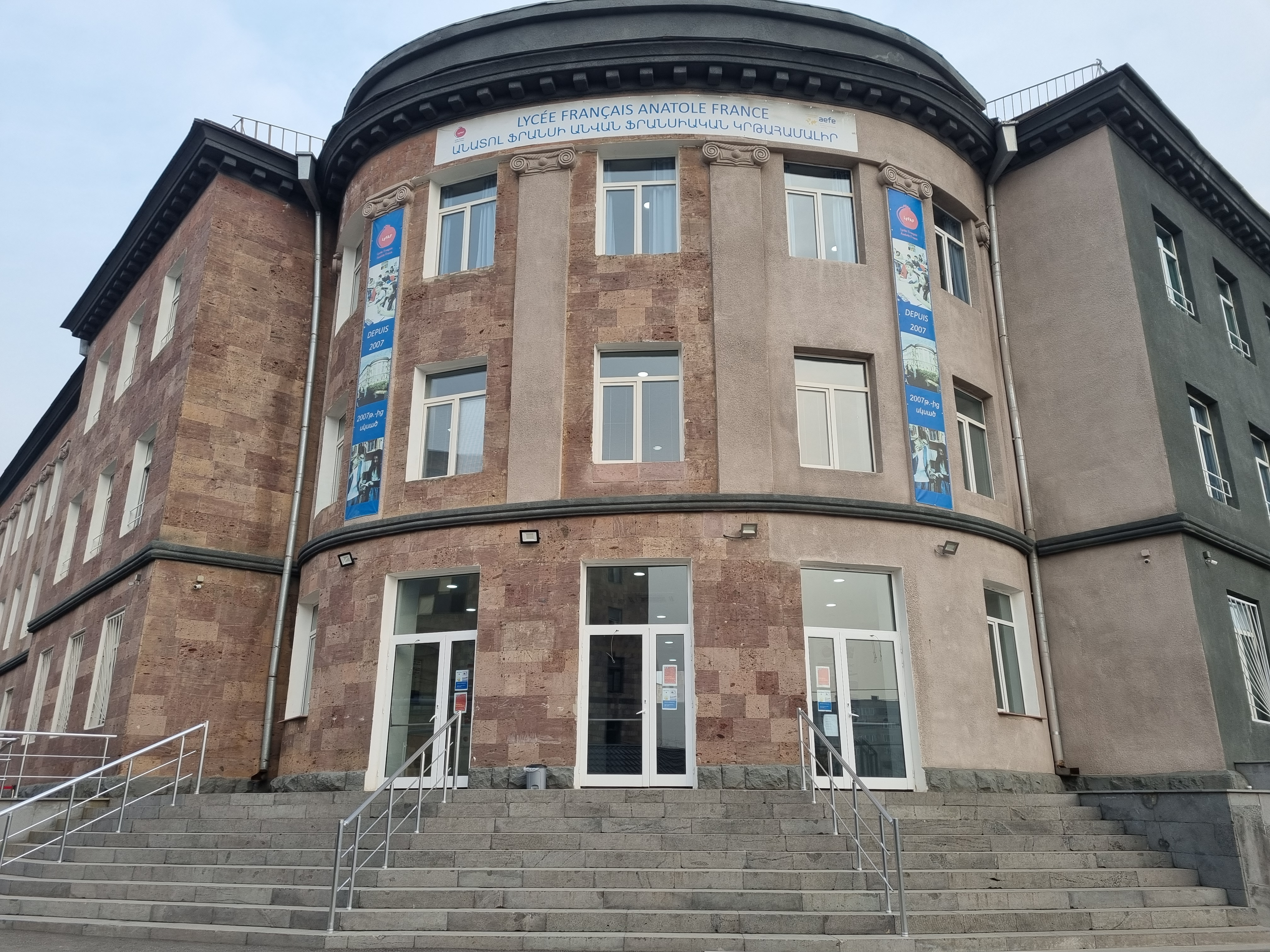

Location
- 37 Burnazian street, Yerevan; Yerevan, Yerevan; Armenia

Information
- Type: Private
- Established: 2007
- Principal: Christian CHÂLE
- Grades: Pre-school (2 to 5 years old); 1 - 12 grades
- Enrollment: 294
- Affiliations: Ministry of Education of France
- Languages: French, English, Armenian, German, Spanish, Russian, Italian, Portuguese,
- Website: lyceefrancais.am

Lycée Français Anatole France (LyFAF; Armenian: Անատոլ Ֆրանսի անվան Ֆրանսիական Կրթահամալիր), is a French school in Yerevan, Armenia, founded in 2007. The school collaborates with the Ministry of Education of the French Republic and the Embassy of France in Armenia. The school operates under the French National education license.

As of 2021, the principal of the school is Mr. Christian Châle.

== History ==
The French School in Armenia was founded in 2007 in Yerevan with only 9 students during its first academic year in 2007–08. The school celebrated its 10th anniversary on 3 June 2017.

On 30 March 2018, the school was renamed after the French poet, novelist and winner of the 1921 Nobel Prize in Literature Anatole France, during a ceremony attended by the French Secretary of State to the Minister for Europe and Foreign Affairs Jean-Baptiste Lemoyne, the Armenian Minister of Education Levon Mkrtchyan, and the French Ambassador to Armenia Jonathan Lacôte. According to ministers Lemoyne and Mkrtchyan, the school was renamed after Anatole France as a tribute to his great influence he had on supporting the Armenian cause during the difficult times of the Armenian nation.

== Structure ==
The school has the following structure:

- Primary school, with 2 sections: pre-school kindergarten, and elementary school (grades 1 to 6).
- Middle school : grades 7 to 9
- High school : grades 10 to 12
- Armenian Section : high school (grades 10 to 12)

As of the 2021-2022 academic year, there are 294 students in the Lycée Français Anatole France.
