= Librairie orientaliste Paul Geuthner =

French publishing company

Coordinates: 48.842182°N 2.330212°E

Libraire orientaliste Paul Geuthner
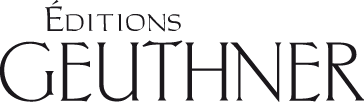
- Founded: 1901
- Founder: Paul Geuthner
- Successor: Société nouvelle Librairie orientaliste Paul Geuthner
- Country of origin: France
- Headquarters location: 16 rue de la Grande-Chaumière, Paris
- Key people: Myra Prince (since 1998)
- Nonfiction topics: Near, middle and far eastern studies
- Official website: geuthner.com

Librairie Orientaliste Paul Geuthner is a French bookstore and publishing house founded in Paris in 1901 by the eponymous publisher, Paul Geuthner, a Saxon from Leipzig, who was naturalized French in 1914 and died in 1949.

Librairie Orientaliste Paul Geuthner specializes in oriental studies, it publishes mainly essays, texts, manuals of ancient languages and travel accounts on the Near, Middle and Far East.

== History ==
For several decades, it was a partner of the École nationale des langues orientales vivantes (National School of Living Oriental Languages), of which it was the sole publisher until 1971. It published numerous collections under the aegis of this institution, both for the languages and civilizations of the Arab-Muslim world and other countries in Asia. The publisher also collaborates with other cultural and scientific institutions, such as the Guimet Museum. In 1971, it was associated with the launching of Publications Orientalistes de France, but the partnership was short-lived.

In 1982, the founder's grandnephew, Marc Frédéric Seidl-Geuthner, took over the company, which was in difficult financial situation.

In 1998, Marc Frédéric sold the family business to a group of Franco-Lebanese bibliophiles. The Lebanese sociologist and architect Myra Prince took over the management of the company, which became Société nouvelle Librairie orientaliste Paul Geuthner.
