= Henri Massé =

French orientalist

- Born: 2 March 1886
- Died: 9 November 1969 (aged 83); Paris
- Occupation: Scholar

Henri Massé (2 March 1886 – 9 November 1969) was a 20th-century French orientalist. He was first professor of Arabic and Persian literatures at the faculté des lettres d'Alger, then professor of Persian language at the École nationale des langues orientales vivantes of Paris (1927–1958), of which he was administrator from 1948 to 1958 and a member of the Académie des Inscriptions et Belles-Lettres.

== Selected bibliography ==
- Croyances et coutumes persanes, suivies de Contes et chansons populaires, Paris, Librairie orientale et américaine, 1938
- Le Livre des merveilles du monde, Paris, Éditions du Chêne, 1944
- Anthologie persane, XI^{e} - XIX^{e} siècles, dernière réédition (2004) dans la Petite Bibliothèque Payot, n°330, ISBN 2-228-89923-2
- L'Islam, Édition Armand Colin, Paris (Section d'histoire et sciences économiques), 5e édition revue, 1948
- Essai sur le poète Saadi, Librairie orientaliste Paul Geuthner
- Les épopées persanes : Firdousi et l'épopée nationale, Éditions Perrin
- Croyances et coutumes persanes (2 vol.), G. P. Maisonneuve
- Le Béharistan de Djami (traduit du persan), Librairie orientaliste Paul Geuthner
- Contes en persan populaire (recueillis et traduits), Imprimerie nationale
- L'exposé des religions d'Abou'l-Maâli (translated from Persian), Éditions Leroux
- Mélanges d'orientalisme offerts à Henri Massé... à l'occasion de son 75e anniversaire, Téhéran, Impr. de l'université, coll. * 1963: Publications of the University of Tehran
