= Nomad studies =

Anthropological study of nomadic peoples

Nomad studies (Russian: Кочевниковедение, romanized: kochevnikovedenie or номадистика, nomadistika) is a branch of historical and anthropological studies specialised in cultures and the history of nomad peoples, particularly the Eurasian nomads and the history of the Eurasian steppes. Studies of the Eurasian nomads influence the political idea of Eurasianism.

Among notable researchers in that field were Lev Gumilyov, Pyotr Savitskiy, Sergei Rudenko, George Vernadsky, Nikolai Trubetzkoy, Hara-Davan Erendzhen, Mikhail Artamonov, and others.

According to Savitskiy, the history of Scythians and Huns encompasses in general (within historically foreseeable events) over 12 centuries. Savitskiy claims that the nomad culture of Scythians and Huns should be considered as a culture of horse and iron.
