= Jean-Luc Domenach =

French historian (1945–2026)

Jean-Luc Domenach (11 August 1945 – 8 January 2026) was a French historian, sinologist and political scientist. He was a senior research fellow at Fondation nationale des sciences politiques. His research focused on Chinese and Asian politics.

== Life and career ==
Domenach was born in Hauterives, France on 11 August 1945. From 1985 to 1994, Jean-Luc Domenach was the director of the Centre d'études et de recherches internationales (CERI). From 1995 to 2000, he was scientific director of the Fondation Nationale des Sciences Politiques. From 2002, he was based in Beijing, as head of French-Chinese doctoral workshop of Tsinghua University, which later morphed into the Centre Franco-Chinois. After 2007, he taught at the Paris Institute of Political Studies.

Domenach died on 8 January 2026, at the age of 80.

== Notable books ==
In "The Origins Of The Great Leap Forward", the first major study of the Great Leap, Jean-Luc Domenach focuses on the central China province of Henan, which emerged as a national model of the Great Leap and was one of the most devastated by its failure. In "The Forgotten Gulag: China's Hidden Prison Camps", he presented a comprehensive description of the Chinese Gulag system.

== Selected bibliography ==
- The Origins Of The Great Leap Forward: The Case Of One Chinese Province, by Westview Press (1995) and Routledge (1996); Translation of "Aux origines du Grand Bond en avant, le cas d'une province chinoise", Paris, Presses de la FNSP, 1982.
- The Forgotten Gulag: China's Hidden Prison Camps, Simon & Schuster Limited, 1994. Translation of "Chine : L'archipel oublié", Paris, Fayard, 1992.
- With Philippe Richer : La Chine 1949-1994, Paris, Le Seuil, 1985.
- With David Camroux : L'Asie retrouvée, Paris, Le Seuil, 1997.
- L'Asie en danger, Paris, Fayard, 1998 (ISBN 2-213-59762-6)
- With Aimé Savard : L'Asie et nous, Paris, Desclée de Brouwer, 2001 (ISBN 2-220-05029-7)
- China's Uncertain Future, Columbia University Press, 2012. China's Uncertain Future, Columbia University Press, (ISBN 978-0-231-15225-9). Translation of Où va la Chine ?, Paris, Fayard, 2002.
- Comprendre la Chine d'aujourd'hui, Paris, Perrin, 2007
- La Chine m'inquiète, Paris, Perrin, 2008.
- Mao, sa cour et ses complots. Derrière les Murs rouges, Fayard, 2012.
- Les fils de princes. Une génération au pouvoir en Chine, Fayard, 2016
