= Dagpo Rinpoche =

Tibetan Buddhist lama (born 1932)

His Eminence Lama Dagpo Rinpoche
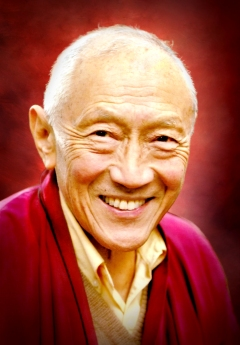
- Title: The Reincarnation of Dagpo Lama Jampel Lhundrup

Personal life
- Born: 1932 (age 93–94) Kongpo, Southeastern Tibet

Religious life
- Religion: Buddhism

Dagpo Rinpoche (born 1932), also known as Bamchoe Rinpoche, is a lama in the Tibetan Buddhist tradition.

== Biography ==
Born in Dhagpo, located in southeastern U-Tsang in Tibet, Dagpo Rinpoche was recognized by the Thirteenth Dalai Lama as the reincarnation of Dagpo Lama Jampel Lhundrup when he was only two years old. At age six, Rinpoche entered Bamchoe Monastery where he first learned to read and write, studying Tibetan Buddhism.

At age thirteen, Dagpo Rinpoche began studying Buddhist philosophy at Dagpo Shedrup Ling. When he was twenty four, he continued his studies at Drepung Monastery.

Throughout his studies, Dagpo Rinpoche had the opportunity to study under many great Buddhist masters such as the Dalai Lama, Ling Rinpoche, and Trijang Rinpoche.

In 1959, as the Chinese invaded Tibet, he followed the Dalai Lama into exile in India. In 1961, he moved to France, where he took up a research and teaching position at INALCO at Sorbonne University in Paris. He started several Buddhist centers, first in France and later in the Netherlands, Switzerland and Asia. He has been particularly active in teaching and reviving Buddhism in Indonesia and Malaysia.

On July 11, 2025, Dagpo Rinpoche was awarded the Legion of Honor, making him the first Tibetan to receive France's highest national distinction of merit. It was awarded for his decades-long dedication to preserving and promoting Tibetan Buddhist philosophy, intercultural dialogue, and enriching French society through his academic and spiritual activities.

Dagpo Rimpoche is considered a reincarnation of the 10th century Buddhist master Dharmakīrtiśrī (Tibetan: Serlingpa; Wylie: gser gling pa; Chinese: 金州大師, literally "from Suvarnadvīpa"), also known as Kulānta and Suvarṇadvipi Dharmakīrti, a renowned 10th century Buddhist teacher in Sumatra (Indonesia). In Tibetan Buddhism, Serlingpa is remembered as a key teacher of Atiśa, an 11th-century Bengal teacher who responsible for a major transmission of Buddhism to Tibet.

== Quotes ==
"In today's modern society there are huge problems. Everyone wants happiness and to avoid suffering but we do not know how to achieve it. Sometimes we try to do it by accumulating wealth or by harming and dominating others.

"There are those who think they can be happy by taking control over others and misleading them. They commit dishonest deeds. As a result they create problems for themselves. Buddhism can help pinpoint the source of our unhappiness.

"People have to learn to lead an ethical and principled life.

You must respect others as well as yourself. You must respect not only human life but also that of other beings. Ideally we should refrain from killing any form of life. Conflicts can be avoided through mutual respect and discussions.

== See also ==
- Thoupten Phuntshog
