= Pierre de Labriolle =

French philologist, Latinist and historian

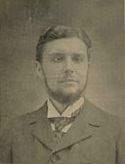
Pierre de Labriolle

Pierre Champagne de Labriolle (18 June 1874 – 28 December 1940) was a French philologist, Latinist and historian.

== Biography ==
Pierre Champagne de Labriolle, conventionally known as Pierre de Labriolle, was born in Asnières-sur-Seine, Île-de-France on 18 June 1874. He was educated at the University of Paris. He was employed as a professor of French literature at the Université Laval in Montreal in 1898–1901, and of Latin language and literature at the University of Fribourg in 1904–1919, University of Poitiers in 1919–1926 and University of Paris (faculté des lettres de Paris) from 1926 until May 1940.

Labriolle specialised in early Christian literature in Latin and in particular Tertullian. Among his most notable works are History and Literature of Christianity from Tertullian to Boethius (1920) and La Réaction païenne : étude sur la polémique antichrétienne du Ier au VIe siècle (1934, lit. 'The pagan reaction: study of the anti-Christian polemic of the first to sixth century'). According to the scholar John Granger Cook, writing in 2000, the latter work was "still unsurpassed in its scope and erudition".

Labriolle was the father of the Slavist François de Labriolle.

== List of works ==
- Un apologiste du IVe siècle, Lactance, Librairie de Montligeon, 1904
- Saint Vincent de Lérins, Paris, Bloud, 1905
- Tertullien jurisconsulte, Paris, L. Larose et L. Tenin, 1906
- Saint Ambroise, Paris, Bloud, 1908
- La correspondance d'Ausone et de Paulin de Nole : avec une étude critique, des notes et un appendice sur la question du Christianisme d'Ausone, Paris, Bloud, 1910
- La crise montaniste, Paris, Ernest Leroux, 1913
- Les sources de l'histoire du montanisme, Paris, Ernest Leroux, 1913
- Histoire de la littérature latine chrétienne, Paris, Les Belles Lettres, 1920
- Les Satires de Juvénal : Étude et Analyse, Paris, Mellottée, 1932
- La Réaction païenne : étude sur la polémique antichrétienne du Ier au VIe siècle, Paris, L'Artisan du Livre, 1934

=== Works in English translation ===
- History and Literature of Christianity from Tertullian to Boethius, tr. Herbert Wilson, London, Kegan Paul, Trench, Trübner & Co., 1924
- The Life and Times of St. Ambrose, tr. Herbert Wilson, St. Louis, B. Herder Book Co., 1928
