= Jonathan Lacôte =

French diplomat (born 1972)

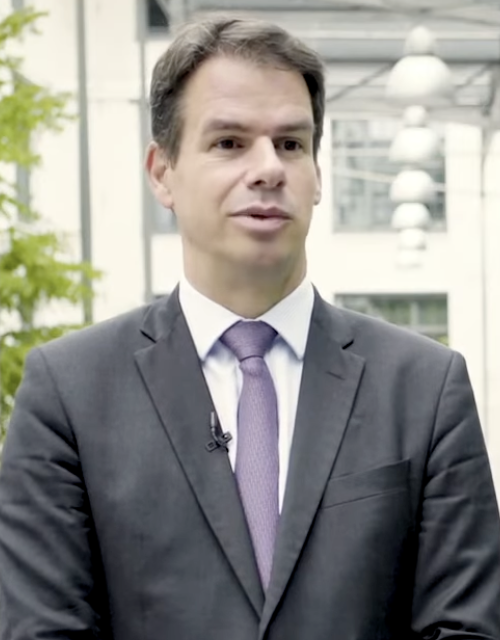
- Lacôte in 2018

Ambassador of France to Hungary
- Incumbent
- Assumed office 24 September 2024
- President: Emmanuel Macron
- Preceded by: Claire Legras

Ambassador of France to Armenia
- In office 12 September 2017 – 14 August 2021
- President: Emmanuel Macron
- Preceded by: Jean-François Charpentier
- Succeeded by: Anne Louyot

Personal details
- Born: Jonathan Joël Robert Lacôte; 15 September 1972 (age 54) Paris, France
- Education: Sciences Po; Institut national des langues et civilisations orientales
- Occupation: Diplomat

Jonathan Joël Robert Lacôte (French pronunciation: [ʒɔnatɑ̃ lakot]; born 15 September 1972) is a French diplomat and senior civil servant who has served as ambassador of France to Hungary since 2024. He previously served as ambassador to Armenia from 2017 to 2021.

== Biography ==
Jonathan Lacôte attended school in Hove (United Kingdom), Treillières, Nantes and Lycée Condorcet in Paris. A graduate of the Institute of Political Studies of Paris and of the National Institute of Oriental Languages and Civilizations (INALCO) in Hungarian and Estonian, he entered the Ministry of Foreign Affairs through the competition of foreign affairs adviser in 1997. He has taught as a lecturer at IEP Paris and at INALCO.

After serving in the Common Foreign and Security Policy (CFSP), he was appointed an adviser to the French Embassy in Belgrade (then in the Federal Republic of Yugoslavia) in 2001 before becoming the head of the office of the French Embassy in Podgorica, Montenegro, before the country's accession to independence, in 2003. A first Secretary at the French Embassy in Berlin in 2005, he became technical advisor in charge of European Union external relations and Franco-German cooperation in the office of the Secretary of State for European Affairs, Jean-Pierre Toy, in 2007 . He kept these functions with his successor, Bruno Le Maire, before becoming deputy director in June 2009 and then in July 2009 - a Director of the Cabinet of the Secretary of State for European Affairs, Pierre Lellouche.

Deputy Director of Personnel at the Human Resources Department of the Ministry of Foreign Affairs from 2011, he was Minister-Counselor (Deputy Head of Mission) at the French Embassy in London from 2014 to 2017. In 2017, he was appointed Ambassador of France to Armenia until August 2021 when he was replaced by Anne Louyot.

== Honours ==
- Knight of the Ordre national du Mérite (2023)
