= Joseph Ginat =

Israeli author (1936–2009)

- יוסף גינת
- Born: Yosef Ginat; March 6, 1936; British Mandate of Palestine
- Died: 2009 (aged 72–73); Israel
- Occupations: Anthropologist, Author, Political Advisor, Soldier
- Spouse: Dalia
- Writing career
- Genres: Anthropology, Middle Eastern Studies, Post-Colonialism, Political Science
- Subjects: Israel, Palestine, Arab-Israeli conflict, Polygamy, Arab culture
- Military career
- Allegiance: Israel Defense Forces
- Service years: 1948–1967
- Rank: Sergeant Aide-de-Camp of Moshe Dayan
- Conflicts: 1948 Arab-Israeli War; Suez Campaign; Six-Day War
- Website: israel-stu.haifa.ac.il/staff/ginat.htm

Joseph Ginat (Hebrew: יוסף גינת; March 6, 1936 – 2009) was an Israeli anthropologist, author, political advisor, and soldier.

== Biography ==
Joseph Ginat was a Sabra, a Jew born in Atarot settlement north to Jerusalem before Israel was created on May 14, 1948. Ginat's grandfather, a Levite, came to live in the Promised Land and to be buried in what he considered to be sacred soil.

== Military service ==
During the 1948 Arab–Israeli War, at twelve-years-old, Ginat was given a World War I rifle and told to defend the east entry of a small Jewish village north of Jerusalem. He parachuted into the Sinai Peninsula with the Paratroopers Brigade during the Suez Crisis. Ginat fought in the battle of Jerusalem during the Six-Day War in 1967 and served as an aide-de-camp to General Moshe Dayan and a recognizant for the tank brigade.

== Education and academic career ==
Ginat received his Bachelor of Arts in anthropology from The Hebrew University of Jerusalem in 1964 and his Master of Arts from Tel Aviv University in anthropology in 1970. He completed his Ph.D. at the University of Utah's Department of Anthropology in 1975 submitting a dissertation entitled "A Rural Arab Community in Israel: Marriage Patterns and Woman's Status."

Ginat was an instructor at the University of Haifa from 1974 to 1975, lecturer from 1976 to 1981, senior lecturer from 1982 to 1987, and associate Professor from 1988 to 1996. He was made full Professor at The University of Haifa in 1996.

He served as a visiting professor at numerous other universities:

- 1970, 1972 — Visiting Instructor, University of Utah
- 1971, 1975 — Visiting Professor, Brigham Young University, Utah (summers)
- 1974-1975 — Instructor, University of Haifa, Israel
- 1976-1981 — Lecturer (Assistant Professor), University of Haifa
- 1978 — Visiting Professor, University of Utah (spring, summer)
- 1979 — Visiting Professor, Tel Aviv University (summer)
- 1981-1982 — Visiting Professor, Concordia University, Montreal, Canada
- 1982-1985 — Senior Lecturer, University of Haifa
- 1986 — Teaching Anthropology, Department of Land of Israel, University of Haifa
- 1988-1989 — Visiting Professor, Tel Aviv University (part-time)
- 1988-1996 — Associate Professor, University of Haifa
- 1992-1996 — Director, Jewish-Arab Center, University of Haifa
- 1996 — Full Professor, University of Haifa
- 1998-2000 — Visiting Professor, The University of Oklahoma
- 1998-2007 — International Studies Program - Peace Studies, University of Oklahoma

== Professional appointments ==
- 1964-1968 — Director, Central and Southern District, Prime Minister of Israel's Office, Department of Arab Affairs, Israel
- 1968-1975 — Deputy Advisor on Arab Affairs to Prime Minister of Israel (on leave 1970-1972, 1974–1975)
- 1976-1978 — Senior Researcher, Prime Minister's Office, Department of Arab Affairs
- 1980-1981 — Member, Advisory Committee on Bedouin Sedentarization, Ministry of Agriculture, Israel
- 1980-1981 — Personal Advisor on Arab Affairs to the Late Moshe Dayan
- 1985-1986 — Advisor on Arab Affairs to the Prime Minister and Senior Assistant to Minister Ezer Weizman, the Prime Minister's Office
- 1987-1989 — Advisor on Arab Affairs to Vice Premier and the Minister of Agriculture
- 1989-1992 — Director, The Israeli Academic Center in Cairo, Egypt
- 1993-1996 — Senior Advisor to the Minister of Tourism, Israel
- 1993-1996 — Member, National Advisory Committee for Women Status and Role, attached Prime Minister's Office
- 1994 — Advisor to the Israeli Team, Multilateral Committee on Refugees
- 1995 — Chairman, Committee for Relationships with Arab and Mouslim Countries, The Labor Party, Israel

== Work with The Church of Jesus Christ of Latter-day Saints ==
Ginat was influential in Mormon history, and developed personal relationships with several LDS Church presidents. Ginat learned from Ezra Taft Benson that one of the earliest LDS apostles, Orson Hyde, had traveled from synagogue to synagogue in Europe trying to convince Jews to return to Jerusalem, and had dedicated the holy land for their return in 1841. Because this predated Theodor Hertzl, who is widely credited as being the father of modern Zionism, Ginat saw Hyde as having been the first Zionist, and went to great lengths to honor him as such.

Ginat was instrumental in the construction of an Orson Hyde Memorial Garden on the Mount of Olives. There is also an Orson Hyde Square located at Netanya Academic College, north of Tel Aviv, where Ginat served as college vice-president.

== Scholarships, awards and research grants ==
- 1972-1973 — University of Utah Research Committee
- 1972 — University of Utah Park Foundation
- 1972 — Harriet Travis Foundation, Utah
- 1972 — Prime Minister's Office, State of Israel
- 1973-1974 — Emeq Hefer Regional Council, Israel
- 1973-1975 — University of Haifa, Faculty of Humanities
- 1974-1975 — Histadrut - Israeli General Federation of Labor, Research Committee
- 1975 — American Philosophical Society
- 1978 — University of Haifa, Research Authority
- 1979 — University of Haifa, the Jewish Arab Center
- 1979 — University of Haifa, Faculty of Humanities, Research Committee
- 1980-1983 — The Israeli National Council for Research
- 1987 — The Jerusalem Institute for Israel Studies
- 1987-1989 — The University of Utah Research Authority
- 1993-1994 — Tel Aviv University, The Tami Steinmetz Center for Peace Research
- 1994-1995 — Tel Aviv University, The Tami Steinmetz Center for Peace Research
- 1994-1995 — Tel Aviv University, the Kaplan Chair in the History of Egypt and Israel
- 1995-1996 — University of Haifa, Faculty of Humanities
- 1995-1996 — University of Haifa, Research Authority
- 1996 — Ben-Zvi Institute, Jerusalem
- 1996 — Cultural Authority, Department for Druze Culture, Ministry of Education and Culture
- 1996-1997 — Institute of Conflict Resolution, Universitat Bielefeld, Germany
- 1997 — Rockefeller Foundation, at Bellagio, Italy
- 1997 — Amos Foundation-The Office of the President of Israel
- 1998-1999 — Fulbright-The University of Oklahoma Award

== Publications ==
- The Bedouin. Jerusalem: School of tourism, Ministry of Tourism, 1966 (Hebrew).
- The Significance of Mountain Name in the Sinai. Teva Ve-Ha-Aretz [Nature and Country], 2:240-248, 1969 (Hebrew).
- The Bedouin of the Negev in the Ayalon basin. In: Agan Nahal Ayalon Ha-Maaravi [The Western Ayalon Basin], S. Marton, ed. Tel Aviv: Hakibbutz Hameuchad, 1970 (Hebrew).
- "Bedouin," Encyclopaedia Judaica. Jerusalem: Keter Publishing House, 9:1043-1045, 1971.
- with S. Parker and J. Smith: Father absence and cross-sex identity: The puberty rites controversy revisted. American Enthnologist 2, 687-706, 1975.
- Changes in family structure among rural Arabs. Squiroth (Occasional Papers on the Middle East) June, No. 3 Tel Aviv: The Shiloah Center for Middle Eastern and African Studies, Tel Aviv University, June 1976 (Hebrew).
- Blood revenge in Bedouin societies, Squirot (ccasional Papers on the Middle East), No. 15, Haifa: The Jewish Arab Center, The Institute of Middle Eastern Studies, The University of Haifa, January 1978 (Hebrew).
- Illicit sexual relationships and family honor. In: S. Giora Shoham and Anthony Graham (eds.) Israel Studies in Criminology 5, Ramat Gan: Turtledove Publishing, 1979.
- Employment as a Factor for Social Change in the Arab Village. Squirot (Occasional Papers on the Middle East). Tel Aviv: Sapir Center and Shiloah Center for Middle East and African Studies, Tel Aviv University, 1981 (Hebrew).
- Women in Muslim rural Society: Status and Role in Family and Community. New Brunswick, NJ: Transaction, 1982.
- "Meshames" - the outcast in Bedouin societies. Nomadic People 12, 26-48, 1983.
- Blood Revenge in Bedouin Societies. In: E. Marx and A. Shmueli (eds.) The Changing Bedouin. New Brunswick, NJ: Transaction, and The Shiloah Center for Middle Eastern and African Studies, Tel Aviv University, pp. 59–82, 1984.
- Sedentarization of Negev Bedouin in Rural Communities. Nomadic People 15, 1-33, 1984.
- Frauer in der polygynen Mormonen Gesellschaft (The bride in polygynous Mormon Societies). In: Heransgegeben von Gisela Volger and Karin V. Welch, Die Braut, Koln: Ethnologica Ranterstranch-Joest-Museums. Der Stadt Koln, pp. 210–217, 1985.
- The role of the mediator in disputes among Bedouin and Arab rural societies. In: S. Giora Shoham (ed.) Israel Studies in Criminology 7, pp. 89–131, 1986.
- The Arab vote: Palestinization or protest. In: A. Arian (ed.) The Elections in Israel. Tel Aviv" Ramot, pp. 151–167, 1987.
- Blood Disputes among Bedouin and rural Arabs in Israel: Revenge, Mediation, Outcast and Family Honor. Pittsburgh: University of Pittsburgh Press in cooperation with Jerusalem Institute for Israel Studies, 1987.
- Analysis of the Arab vote in the 1984 elections. Occasional Papers, No. 100. Tel Aviv: Dayan Center, Tel Aviv University, September 1987.
- The establishing of an Israeli Arab: The Israeli minority in Israel as an ethnic, social and political community, Sqira Hodshit (Monthly Review), 35(11) December 1988 (Hebrew).
- Israel Arabs: Some recent social and political trends. Asian and African Studies 23, 183-204, 1989.
- Patterns of voting and political behavior among the Israeli Arabs. In: Jacob M. Landau (ed.) The Arab Vote in Israel's Parliamentary Elections, 1988. Jerusalem: The Jerusalem Institute for Israel Studies, pp. 3–22, 1989.
- The elections in the Arab sector: Voting patterns and political behavior. The Jerusalem Quarterly 53, 27-55, Winter 1990.
- with Irwin Altman: Place attachment: How many meanings? In: . Mazis, C. Karoletsov and K. Tsovtala (eds.) Socio-environmental metamorphoses. Conference proceedings: International Association of People-Environment Studies (IAPS 12), Porto Carras, Greece, pp. 8–15, 1992.
- Editing the Bulletin of the Israel Academic Center in Cairo, 1989–1992, vols. 13-17.
- with Carol M. Werner, Irwin Altman and Barbara B. Brown: Celebrations in personal relationships: A transactional/dialectical perspective. In: Steve Duke (ed.) Social Context and Relationships, Understanding Relationships Processes Series, vol. 3, London: Sage Publications, pp. 109–142, 1993.
- Changes in the Egyptian society since 1973. In Rubin, B., Ginat, J. and Maoz, M. (eds.): From War to Peace 1973-1993. Brighton, U.K. & New York, NY: Sussex Academic Press & New York University Press, 1994.
- with Rubin B. and Maoz, M (eds.): From War to Peace 1973-1993. Brighton, UK & New York, NY: Sussex Academic Press & New York University Press, 1994.
- with Altman, I.: Polygamous Families in Contemporary Society, Coping with Challenging Life Style. Cambridge: Cambridge University Press, 1996.
- Blood Revenge: Family Honor, Mediation and Outcasting. Brighton, U.K.: Sussex Academic Press, 1997.
- with Khazanov. A. (eds.): Changing Patterns of Pastoralists in Changing Societies. Brighton, U.K.: Sussex Academic Press, 1998.
- Change and tradition among Bedouin in Israel In: Ginat, J. and Khazanov, A. (eds.) Changing Patterns of Pastoralists in Changing Societies. Brighton, U.K.: Sussex Academic Press, 1998.
- with Winkler, O. (eds.) Smoothing the Path to Peace: The Israeli-Jordanian-Palestinian Triangle, Brighton, U.K.: Sussex Academic Press, 1998.
- Building up Peace: Interactions between Jordanians, Palestinians and Israelis. In: Ginat, J. and Winkler, O. (eds.) Smoothing the Path to Peace: The Israeli-Jordanian Palestinian Triangle. Brighton, U.K.: Sussex Academic Press, 1998.
- Blood Revenge among Bedouin and rural Arab Societies. Tel Aviv: Zmora Bitan and The University of Haifa, 1999 (in Hebrew).
- with Maoz, M and Winkler, O. (eds.) Modern Syria: A Pivotal Role in the Middle East. Brighton, U.K.: Sussex Academic Press, 1999.
- Arab alAramsha on the Lebanese-Israeli border originated in the Syrian Desert. In: Ginat, J., Maoz, M and Winkler, O. (eds.) Modern Syria: A Pivotal Role in the Middle East. Brighton, U.K.: Sussex Academic Press, 1999.
- A proposal for a Permanent Settlement Plan for the Palestinian Refugees. San Diego, CA, University of California, Institute on Conflict cooperation (to be published).
- with Edward J. Perkins (eds.) The Palestinian Refugees Problem: Traditional Positions and New Solutions. Norman, Oklahoma: University of Oklahoma Press (to be published, 2000).
- with Eickelman, D.F., "From Refugees to Citizens: A Regional Proposal." In Ginat, J. and Perkins, E.J.,(eds.) The Palestinian Refugees Problem: Traditional Positions and New Solutions. Norman, Oklahoma: University of Oklahoma Press (to be published, 2000).
- with Edward J. Perkins (eds.) The Peace Process Between Israel and Arab Countries: Achievements and Obstacles. Norman, Oklahoma: University of Oklahoma Press (to be published, 2000).
- with Aharoni, R., "The Israeli Arabs and the Peace Process" In Ginat, J. and Perkins, E.J.,(eds.) The Peace Process Between Israel and Arab Countries: Achievements and Obstacles. Norman, Oklahoma: University of Oklahoma Press (to be published, 2000).
- Bedouin Bisha’h Justice: Ordeal by Fire. Eastbourne, U.K.: Sussex Academic Press, 2009.
