= Revue des études slaves =

- Discipline: Slavic studies
- Language: English

Publication details
- History: 1921–present
- Publisher: OpenEdition (France)
- Frequency: Quarterly

Standard abbreviations
- ISO 4: Rev. Études Slaves

Indexing
- ISSN: 0080-2557 (print); 2117-718X (web)

Links
- Journal homepage

The Revue des études slaves is a journal of Slavic studies that was established in 1921.
