= Andrea Gallandi =

Italian theologian

Andrea Gallandi (born at Venice, 7 December 1709; died there 12 January 1779, or 1780) was an Italian Oratorian and patristic scholar.

== Life ==
He pursued his theological and historical studies under two Dominicans, Daniello Concina, a moralist, and Bernardo de Rossi (de Rubeis), a noted historical scholar and theologian. With both of these instructors he kept up a friendship after he had joined the Oratory of St. Philip Neri.

== Works ==
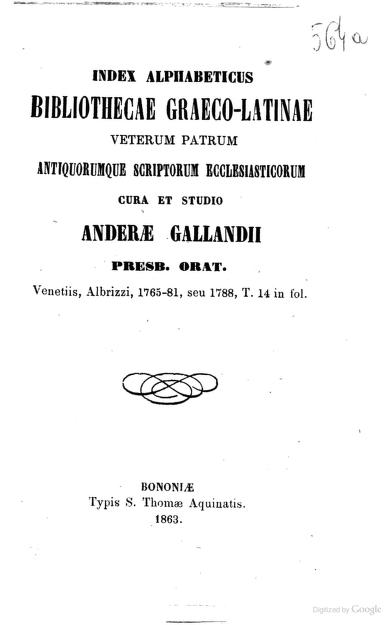

Gallandi established his reputation as a scholar by compiling the work of reference: Bibliotheca veterum patrum antiquorumque scriptorum ecclesiasticorum Græco-Latina (Venice, 1765–81, 14 vols.; 2nd ed., 1788). The work was dedicated to the Venetian Senate, but Gallandi did not live to see its completion. It is a collection of 380 ecclesiastical writers of the first seven centuries. Gallandi gathered together the smaller and less known writings. Greek originals were printed in good type with Latin translations, and copious notes relative to the authors and their works were added.

He also published a collection of the treatises of famous canonists (Pierre Coustant, Girolamo and Pietro Ballerini, etc.) on the origin and development of canon law, which was entitled De vetustis canonum collectionibus dissertationum sylloge (Venice, 1778, 1 vol. folio; Mainz, 1790, 2 vols.). At his death Gallandi left a work which has not been published: Thesaurus antiquitatis ecclesiasticæ historico-apologetico-criticus complectens SS. patrum gesta et scripta doctissimorum virorum dissertationibus asserta et illustrata ac juxta seriem XII sec. digesta.
