= Institut national des langues et civilisations orientales =

Academic language institution in France

Coordinates: 48°49′39″N 2°22′35″E

Inalco
- Type: Public
- Established: 1669; 357 years ago
- Founders: Jean-Baptiste Colbert
- Endowment: €14 million
- President: Jean-François Huchet
- Academic staff: 200
- Students: 8,000
- Doctoral students: 300
- Location: Paris, France
- Website: www.inalco.fr
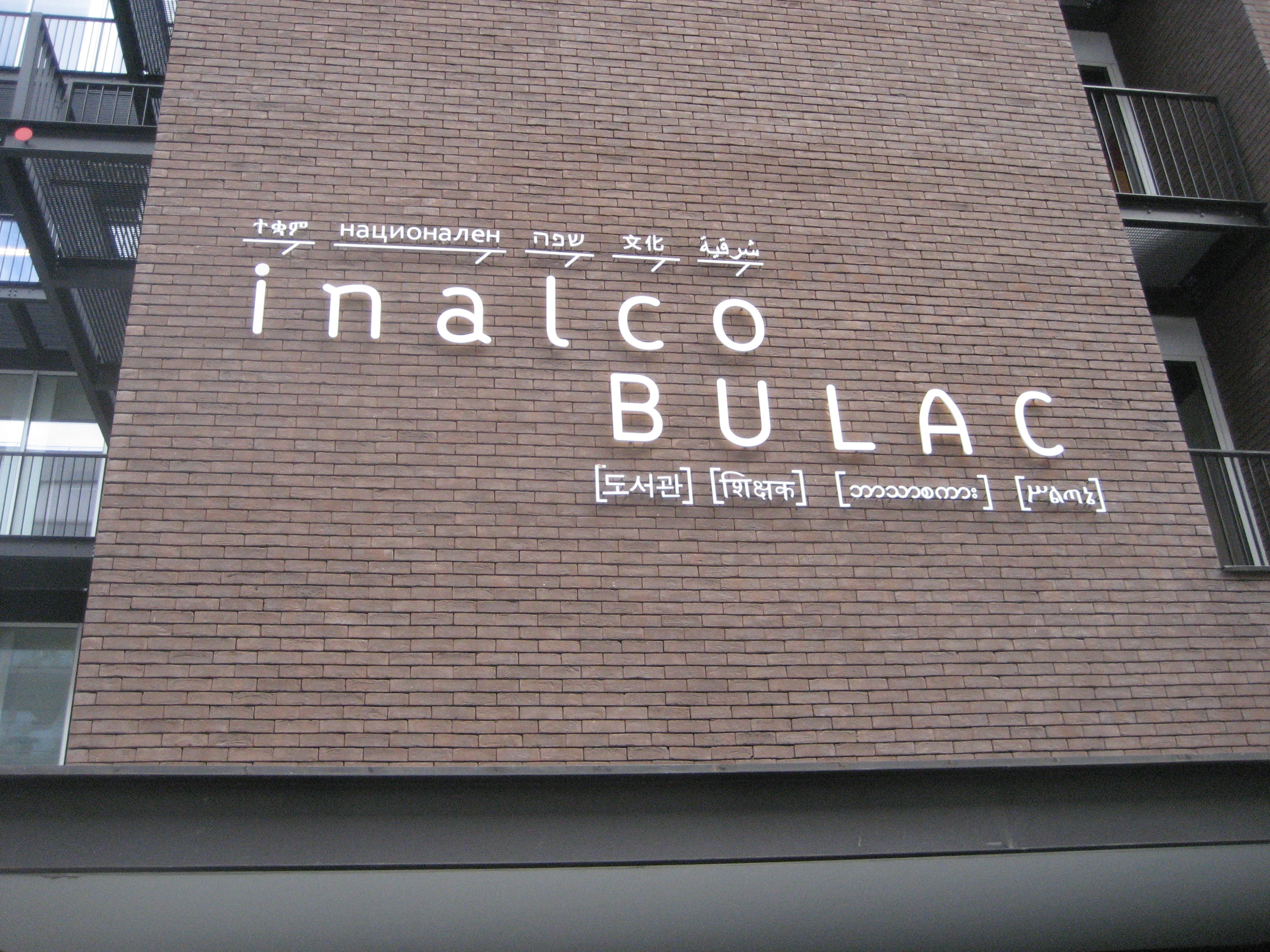

The Institut national des langues et civilisations orientales (French pronunciation: [ɛ̃stity nɑsjɔnal de lɑ̃ɡ e sivilizɑsjɔ̃ ɔʁjɑ̃tal]; transl. "National Institute for Oriental Languages and Civilizations"), abbreviated as INALCO, is a French grand établissement with a specializing in the teaching of languages and cultures from the world. Its coverage spans languages of Central Europe, Africa, Asia, America, and Oceania. With 104 languages taught as of 2024, this institution is currently the world's largest provider of language training courses.

It is also informally called "Langues'O" (French: [lɑ̃ɡz‿o]) in French, an abbreviation for Langues orientales.

The INALCO logo is made up of the school's acronym, each part of which is translated into languages written in non-Latin characters, corresponding to Inalco's fields of teaching and research.

== History ==
- 1669 Jean-Baptiste Colbert founds the École des jeunes de langues language school
- 1795 The École spéciale des langues orientales (ESLO; Special School for Oriental Languages) is established
- 1873 The two schools merge
- 1914 The school is renamed the École nationale des langues orientales vivantes (ENLOV)
- 1971 The school is renamed the Institut national des langues et civilisations orientales or Inalco (National Institute for Oriental Languages and Civilizations)
- 1984 Inalco is recognized as a Grand établissement
- 2010 Inalco becomes a founding member of Sorbonne Paris Cité
- 2011 Inalco centralizes all of its taught courses under one roof at 65 rue des Grands Moulins in Paris

== Teaching ==
=== Organization ===
Inalco is structured partly into departments, whose perimeter corresponds to a region of the world, and partly into professionally-oriented courses or sectors. Departments may be monolingual or group together several language sections. Inalco's courses prepare students for careers in intercultural communication and training, international trade, teaching French as a foreign language, advanced international studies, and Natural Language Processing.

==== List of departments and sections (and their languages) ====
- Africa and Indian Ocean (Amharic, Bambara, Chleuh, Comorian, Fulani, Hausa, Kabyle, Malagasy, Mandingo, Soninke, Swahili, Tuareg, Wolof, Yoruba)
- South Asia Himalayas (Bengali, Hindi, Nepali, Urdu, Rromani, Sanskrit, Sinhalese, Tamil, Telugu, Tibetan)
- Southeast Asia and the Pacific (Bisaya, Burmese, Bislama, Cham, Drehu, Tagalog, Ilocano, Indonesian Malay, Khmer, Lao, Môn, Thai, Tahitian, Taï lü, Vietnamese)
- Arabic Studies (Modern Standard Arabic, Classical Arabic, Algerian, Moroccan, Tunisian, Egyptian, Syrian-Lebanese)
- Chinese Studies (Standard Chinese, Min, Classical Chinese)
- Korean Studies (Korean)
- Hebrew and Jewish Studies (Biblical, Rabbinic, Medieval and Modern Hebrew, Judeo-Arabic, Judeo-Spanish, Yiddish)
- Japanese Studies (Japanese)
- Russian Studies (Russian, Belarusian)
- Eurasia (Armenian, Azeri, Georgian, Kurdish, Mongolian, Ossetian, Uyghur, Uzbek, Pashto, Persian, Kazakh, Tatar, Turkish)
- Europe (Polish, Czech, Sorbian, Slovak, Slovene, Bosnian-Croatian-Serbian, Bulgarian, Macedonian, Ukrainian, Hungarian, Finnish, Estonian, Udmurt, Latvian, Lithuanian, Romanian, Modern Greek, Albanian)
- Languages and cultures of the Americas (Inuktitut languages, Mayan languages, Quechuan languages, Guarani, Nahuatl)

==== List of sectors ====
- International trade
- Intercultural communication and training
- Language didactics
- International relations
- Text, Computing, and Mutlilingualism (NLP)

The Institute offers initial training at Bachelor's, Master's and PhD levels, as well as continuing education open to external students and professionals. Foreign students can take French as a foreign language courses. Short, à la carte courses, evening classes and “practical certificates” are also popular.

== Research ==
=== Overview ===
Research at Inalco combines area studies and academic fields. Researchers study languages and civilizations that are increasingly in the spotlight – Africa, the Middle East, Asia, and as far as the Arctic – and are central to the major issues of the 21st century. Fourteen research teams, often partnered with other research organizations, PhD programs, and a publishing service form the backbone of research at Inalco. Inalco also has a project management and knowledge transfer service.

The research teams, administration offices, and doctoral school are housed in a building dedicated entirely to research, with access to a full range of support functions: assistance in preparing research proposals and grant applications, organizing scientific events, looking for partnerships and funding, publication support, internal funding, and communication.

- 14 research teams (see below)
- 270 faculty members
- 300 PhD students
- 100 scientific events per year

=== Research teams ===
Local units:

- CERLOM (Centre d'Etude et de Recherche sur les Littératures et les Oralités du Monde)
- CERMOM (Centre d'Etudes et de Recherche Moyen-Orient, Méditerranée)
- CREE (Centre de Recherche Europes-Eurasie)
- ERTIM (Équipe de Recherche Textes, Informatique, Multilinguisme)
- LACNAD (Langues et Cultures du Nord de l’Afrique et Diasporas)
- PLIDAM (Pluralité des Langues et des Identités: Didactique – Acquisition – Médiations)

Joint research units (UMR):

- CASE (Centre Asie du Sud-Est) - with EHESS and CNRS
- CeRMI (Centre de Recherche sur le Monde Iranien) - with Sorbonne nouvelle, EPHE, and CNRS
- CESSMA (Centre d’études en sciences sociales sur les mondes africains, américains et asiatiques) - with UPC and IRD
- CRLAO (Centre de recherches linguistiques sur l'Asie orientale) - with EHESS and CNRS
- IFRAE (Institut français de recherche sur l’Asie de l’Est) - with UPC and CNRS
- LACITO (Langues et Civilisations à Tradition orale) - with Sorbonne Nouvelle and CNRS
- LLACAN (Langage, Langues et Cultures d’Afrique) - with EPHE and CNRS
- SeDyL (Structure et Dynamique des Langues) - with IRD and CNRS

== Presidents ==
From 1914 to 1969, presidents were called administrators.

Dates	Name	Discipline	Comments
1796–1824	Louis-Mathieu Langlès	Persian language	Died in 1824
1824–1838	Antoine-Isaac Silvestre de Sacy	Arabic	Died in 1838
1838–1847	Pierre Amédée Jaubert	Turkish language	military interpreter during the Egyptian campaign 1798
1847–1864	Carl Benedict Hase	modern Greek	Died in 1864
1864–1867	Joseph Toussaint Reinaud	Arabic	Died in 1867
1867–1898	Charles Schefer	Persian	Died in 1898
1898–1908	Charles Barbier de Meynard	Turkish, Persian	Died in 1908
1908–1936	Paul Boyer	Russian language	Died in 1949
1936–1937	Mario Roques	Romanian language	Died in 1961
1937–1948	Jean Deny	Turkish	Died in 1963
1948–1958	Henri Massé	Persian	Died in 1969
1958–1969	André Mirambel	modern Greek	Died in 1970
1969–1971	André Guimbretière	Hindi	Died in 2014
1971–1976	René Sieffert	Japanese language	Died in 2004
1976–1986	Henri Martin de La Bastide d’Hust	Middle East civilisation	Died in 1986
1986–1993	François Champagne de Labriolle	Russian	Vice-president from 1971 to 1986
1993–2001	André Bourgey	Middle East civilisation	
2001–2005	Gilles Delouche	Thai language (Siamese)	Died in 2020
2005–2013	Jacques Legrand	Mongolian language	
2013-2019	Manuelle Franck	Geography of Southeast Asia	Vice-president from 2007 to 2013
Since 2019	Jean-François Huchet	Economy of Eastern Asia	Vice-president from 2013 to 2019

== International ==
Inalco conducts research projects in more than one hundred countries and offers joint programs with foreign universities. This enables Inalco students and their international counterparts to enhance their studies through immersive experiences. Inalco also provides distance learning courses through videoconferencing and online resources, offering instruction in Arabic, Armenian, Burmese, Estonian, Modern Hebrew, Inuktitut, Lithuanian, Malagasy, Quechua, Sinhalese, Slovak, and Swahili.

Inalco is an active member of Sorbonne Paris Cité, with 120,000 students, 8,500 faculty members, and 6,000 technical and administrative staff. Branches have been opened in Singapore, Buenos Aires and São Paulo.

Inalco is in 2007 a founding member of the Consortium for Asian and African Studies (CAAS), with the School of Oriental and African Studies (UK), the Tokyo University of Foreign Studies (Japan), Leiden University (Netherlands), and the National University of Singapore. Since, they have been joined by Columbia University (USA), the Hankuk University of Foreign Studies (South Korea), and Shanghai International Studies University (China).

The foundation strives to develop the preservation, study, transmission, development and interaction of languages and cultures in France and around the world with projects involving the institute's expertise: education, research, advancing knowledge and skills in a globalized world.

More than 120 nationalities are represented by Inalco faculty and students. The institute, along with its teachers, students and partners, organizes over a hundred cultural events a year. Inalco also participates in several international film festivals (such as the Vesoul International Film Festival of Asian Cinema) and makes every effort to share its knowledge and expertise with society.

== Notable professors and alumni ==
- Ivan Aguéli
- Meryem Benm'Barek-Aloïsi
- Doris Bensimon
- Augustin Berque
- Boris Boillon
- Luce Boulnois
- Rémi Brague
- Louis-Jacques Bresnier
- Marianne Bastid-Bruguière
- Auguste Carrière
- Gérard Chaliand
- Jean-François Champollion
- Henry Corbin
- Léon Damas
- Luc-Willy Deheuvels
- Jean-Luc Domenach
- Mathias Énard
- Philippe Étienne
- Bernard Faure
- Edgar Faure
- Princess Fawzia-Latifa of Egypt
- François Godement
- Bruno Gollnisch
- Maurice Gourdault-Montagne
- Marcel Granet
- Marcel Griaule
- Claude Hagège
- Prince Henrik of Denmark
- Isabelle Huppert
- Guillaume Jacques
- Georges Kersaudy
- Ysabelle Lacamp
- Jonathan Lacôte, French Ambassador to Armenia
- Hervé Ladsous
- Gilbert Lazard
- Iaroslav Lebedynsky
- Heinrich Leberecht Fleischer
- Jacques Legrand
- Jean-David Levitte
- Nathalie Loiseau
- André Malraux
- Pierre Messmer
- Souad Kassim Mohamed
- Pierre Mornand
- Louise Peltzer
- Patrick Poivre d'Arvor
- Princess Maria Laura of Belgium, Archduchess of Austria-Este
- Pierre Messmer
- Jean-Jacques Origas
- Trinidad Pardo de Tavera
- William Popper
- Louis Réau
- Clotilde Reiss
- Dagpo Rinpoche
- Olivier Roy
- Laurent Sagart
- André Santini
- Léopold de Saussure
- Aurélien Sauvageot
- Johann Gustav Stickel
- Hissein Brahim Taha
- Nahal Tajadod
- Serge Telle
- Virginie Thévenet
- Germaine Tillion
- Nicole Vandier-Nicolas
- Arnold Van Gennep
- Jacques Vergès
- Jean-Christophe Victor
- Eva de Vitray-Meyerovitch
- Olivier Weber

== See also ==
- Colonial School, Paris

== Notes ==
a. Institute: ተቋም [Amharic]; NAtional: национален [Bulgarian]; Languages: שפה [Hebrew]; Civilizations: 文化 [Chinese]; Oriental: شرقية [Arabic]
