= Malatya dialect =

Dialect of Western Armenian

Malatya
- Malatia
- Մալաթիայի բարբառ Malatiayi barbar
- Native to: Turkey
- Region: Malatya and surrounding villages
- Ethnicity: Armenians
- Native speakers: 0?
- Language family: Indo-European: Armenian; Western; Malatya
- Dialects: Adiyaman
- Writing system: Armenian alphabet

Language codes
- ISO 639-3: (included in Western Armenian hyw)
- Glottolog: mala1453
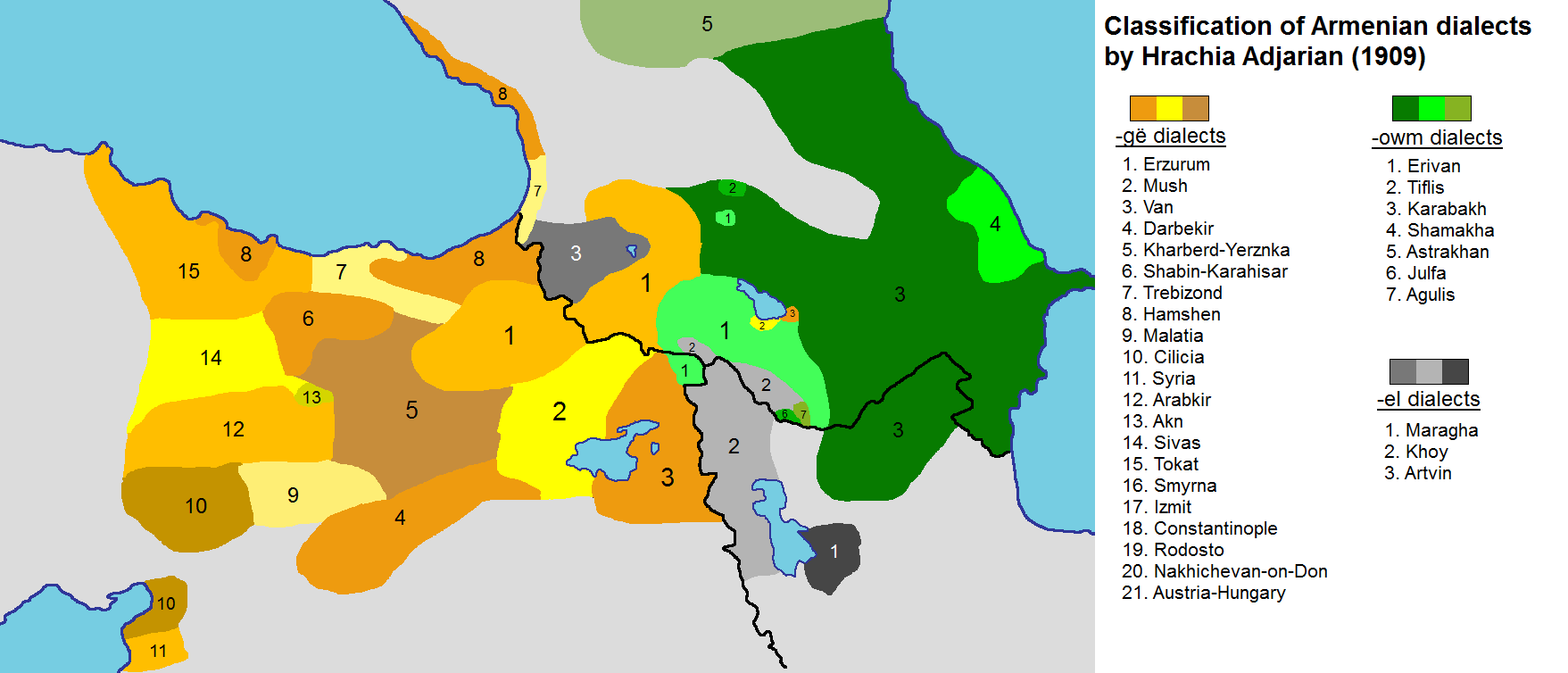
- Malatia

The Malatya dialect of Western Armenian was traditionally spoken in the city of Malatya and nearby villages, extending as far south as Hüsni Mansur (modern Adıyaman). This region formed part of the broader Armenian-speaking world in Anatolia, where distinct local dialects developed over centuries. Unlike areas farther north or west, the Malatya region marked the southern linguistic boundary of Armenian, beyond which Armenian ceased to be spoken. By the late 19th and early 20th centuries, the use of Armenian in Malatya began to decline due to displacement, assimilation, and the Armenian Genocide of 1915.

== Phonetic features ==
The Malatya dialect has received influences from nearby dialects such as Kharberd, Tigranakert, and Cilicia.

Malatya Armenian lost the contrast between certain voiced and voiceless stop consonants. However, because Adjarian's law was triggered before this sound change, the historical contrasts are reflected in Malatya Armenian as contrasts in vowels that follow them. For instance, where earlier stages of Armenian had [tʰas], the corresponding word in Maltya Armenian would be [tʰɑs]; where earlier stages had [das], Maltya Armenian instead has [tʰɐs]. Bert Vaux analyzes this change as involving the spread of an ATR feature from the consonant to the following vowel. Other linguists have disagreed with this analysis, suggesting that the outcomes in the Malatyan are better explained by the Adjarian's law being blocked by an earlier breathiness contrast.

=== Consonant changes ===
Voiceless stops (pʿ, tʿ, kʿ) become voiced (b, d, g):

- Pʿari → Bari ("good")
- Pʿantsʿə → Bardzrə ("high")
- Kʿirkʿ → Girkʿ ("book")

Voiced stops become lenis or softer in articulation:

- Tʿoṙ → Duṙ ("door")
- Tʿanag → Danak ("knife")

=== Vowel changes ===
E > A

- Mantsʿ → Mets ("large")
- Pʿar → Ber ("burden")
- Lar → Ler ("mountain")

I > I

- Tsoṙin → Tsoren ("wheat")
- Khilkʿ → Khelkʿ ("intelligence")

U > O

- Tʿoṙ → Duṙ ("door")
- Čʿoṙ → Juṙ ("water")
- Hoṙm → Hum ("raw")

Ay > E Mer → Mayr ("mother")

- Pʿed → Pʿayt ("wood")
- Eki → Aygi ("garden")

Ay > A

- Tsʿan → Dzayn ("voice")
- Lan → Layn ("wide")

U > I

- Akhpʿir → Aghbyur ("spring")
- Hērir → Haryur ("hundred")
- Erin → Aryun ("blood")

(Also found in the Kharberd-Yerznga dialect, but absent in Tigranakert.)

Oṙ... > O

- Koṙ → Koyr ("sister")
- Loṙs → Loyis ("light")
- Pʿon → Boyn ("nest")

Eo > Tsʿeo

- Tsʿeon → Dzyun ("snow")

== Lexical Features ==
The vocabulary of the Malatya dialect shares similarities with other Western Armenian dialects but also includes borrowings and adaptations from Kurdish, Turkish, and Arabic, reflecting the region's multicultural environment.

Unlike its phonetics, the syntax does not show significant deviations from other Western Armenian dialects.

Comparison with Neighboring Dialects: The Malatya dialect is closely related to the dialects of Kharberd, Tigranakert, and Cilicia, but it also exhibits distinct characteristics:

Shared Features with Kharberd-Yerznga: Unique vowel shifts such as U > I (Akhpʿir → Aghbyur). Distinct from Tigranakert: Tigranakert lacks vowel changes like U > I, which are prominent in Malatya. Purer Phonetics Compared to Cilicia:

Malatya’s phonetics are more conservative and less influenced by external changes compared to Cilician dialects such as Marash.

== Preservation and Decline ==
The Malatya dialect, like many regional Armenian dialects, faced decline following the Armenian Genocide of 1915, which devastated the Armenian population in Anatolia. The few remaining speakers were displaced, and the dialect has since become functionally extinct. Today, it survives only in written records and linguistic studies.

After the genocide, the Armenians that lived in Malatia regrouped themselves in modern day Armenia in Nor Malatia, where the dialect was continued to be spoken.

== Sample texts ==
The following is a story in Malatya Armenian:

Deven inger, hop hopë tsarkeh togh chidâr:

Ochilodë gë kervi, anotin gyuman gəyni: Harsnedunë chë këde, sherepn arrir gə vazeh: Yara chunis ne inchu guchunmish gəllis: Gadunerë katsin, mugerun janpa patsvetsav: Meghavorë jham chë getsir, gaynir eh ne madë achkn eh mdir: Chorë (jurë) sandë tir, dzedze dzedze, gyineh chorr: Dandzë kents tsarë tsandr eh: Chem udir, jeb's trek, chim garkëvir, dzotsës dvek: Chorë bardaghë, desnes, derderë khutsë: Ishun chi hasnir, phalanë dë dzedze: Shanë gë ghenen dë dirumneh gamchnan:

Is guzim shalgoğ, Asvats gəda shalgelik

The following is a story in the Adiyaman subdialect of Malatya Armenian:

Moud ddoum, erin srjes, kʿeor ənnas, khanad kharap ənna' p'atin takë mnas:

Eresid hayoġ chənna, bemurat er-tas: P'ap'ud gankë koġë ch’han̄chi: Astuts’oġ khshmin ert’as, oġul ushaġi t’er chənnas: Ketnin yot’ë hyatakan ants’nis:

Tunid paykhush khosa, achvənərd patë patë patlamish ənna:
