= Turkic loanwords in Armenian =

The vast majority of loanwords from the Turkic languages in the Armenian language are geographically located close to Turkic-speaking regions. This concerns, first of all, the Istanbul Armenian dialect of the language, which borrows the most from the Turkish language.

However, the influence of the Turkic languages spread primarily to the dialects, but not the literary language. Therefore, Turkic loanwords are preserved in the literary language only to a negligible extent. In general, according to Hrachia Acharian, both versions of literary Armenian language contain very little Turkic loanwords. The language of the Ashiks was full of dialect, as well as Turkic and Iranian loanwords.

Some Turkic loanwords became international words, found in other languages as well as Armenian and Turkic.
