= Nor Malatia =

- Location within Armenia
- Coordinates: 40°10′29″N 44°27′39″E
- Country: Armenia
- Marz (Province): Yerevan
- District: Malatia-Sebastia
- Time zone: UTC+4 ( )
  - Summer (DST): UTC+5 ( )

Nor Malatia (Armenian: Նոր Մալաթիա, also, Nor Malat’ia and Malatiya) is a town in the Yerevan Province of Armenia.
