= Armenian PowerSpell =

Armenian-language spell checker software

Armenian PowerSpell, previously known as Armenian Orfo (ArmOrfo), is an electronic corrector for texts in the modern Armenian language used in Armenia. It checks spelling, grammar, punctuation, slang and some semantic errors specific to texts in the Armenian language. The program was widely adopted in Armenia, and among the Armenian diaspora which uses the modern Armenian language. Today the product is used by almost all state and many educational institutions of Armenia.

The program is developed by Arman Boshyan and is distributed by the Armenian company Leader Profi LTD. The product supports Microsoft Windows and is integrated into all versions of Microsoft Office 2000–2010, while older versions worked only in Microsoft Word.

== Features ==
Armenian PowerSpell was specifically developed for the modern Armenian language, taking into account many foreign words which entered Armenian during the Soviet and Post-Soviet periods. It also checks errors specific to people with Russian education. The product can convert texts written in Armenian slang into a literary format. It also checks foreign-language words that do not have standardized Armenian spellings; however, because of the product's wide usage, some de facto standards have been created as a result.

== Criticism ==
The first release of the program, PowerSpell 2009, was criticized for its high price. However, critics nonetheless recognized that the program was the most complete solution for spell-checking the Armenian language. Meanwhile, distributors did not agree with this judgement, stating that the price policy ($24 per year, including annual new versions) programs was accessible to the population.

== Piracy ==
Piracy of the product led to the full paralysis of its development in 2002. Activity on product development has ceased until 2005.
