= Armenian language =

Indo-European language

Armenian
- հայերեն (Note: Spelled in classical orthography as հայերէն.)
- "Armenian language" in the Armenian alphabet
- Pronunciation: [hɑjɛˈɾɛn]
- Native to: Armenia; Georgia (including Abkhazia (Note: The political status of Abkhazia is disputed. Having unilaterally declared independence from Georgia in 1992, Abkhazia is formally recognised as an independent state by 4 UN member states (three other states previously recognised it but then withdrew their recognition), while the remainder of the international community recognizes it as de jure Georgian territory. Georgia continues to claim the area as its own territory, designating it as Russian-occupied territory.)); Iran; Turkey; Azerbaijan
- Ethnicity: Armenians
- Native speakers: 5.3 million (Note: 1.6 million for Western Armenian and 3.7 million for Eastern Armenian) (2013–2021)
- Language family: Indo-European: Armenian
- Early forms: Proto-Indo-European: Proto-Armenian; Classical Armenian; Middle Armenian
- Standard forms: Eastern Armenian; Western Armenian
- Dialects: Yerevan; Homshetsi; Karabakh; Karin; Mush; Kharberd–Yerznka; Shabin–Karahisar; Kakavaberd; Zok; Akn; Malatia; Nor-Nakhichevan
- Writing system: Armenian alphabet; Armenian Braille

Official status
- Official language in: Armenia; Eurasian Economic Union (Note: Though Russian is the working language of the Union according to the Treaty on Eurasian Economic Union, Armenian and the languages of other member states are officially recognized. The websites of the Eurasian Economic Union and the Eurasian Economic Commission are available in Armenian, among other languages.)
- Recognised minority language in: Cyprus; Bulgaria; Iraq; Poland; Romania; Turkey
- Regulated by: Armenian National Academy of Sciences and Language Committee (Armenia); Calouste Gulbenkian Foundation (Western Armenian, de facto)

Language codes
- ISO 639-1: hy
- ISO 639-2: arm (B) hye (T)
- ISO 639-3: Variously: hye – Eastern Armenian hyw – Western Armenian xcl – Classical Armenian axm – Middle Armenian
- Glottolog: arme1241
- Linguasphere: 57-AAA-a
- IETF: hy
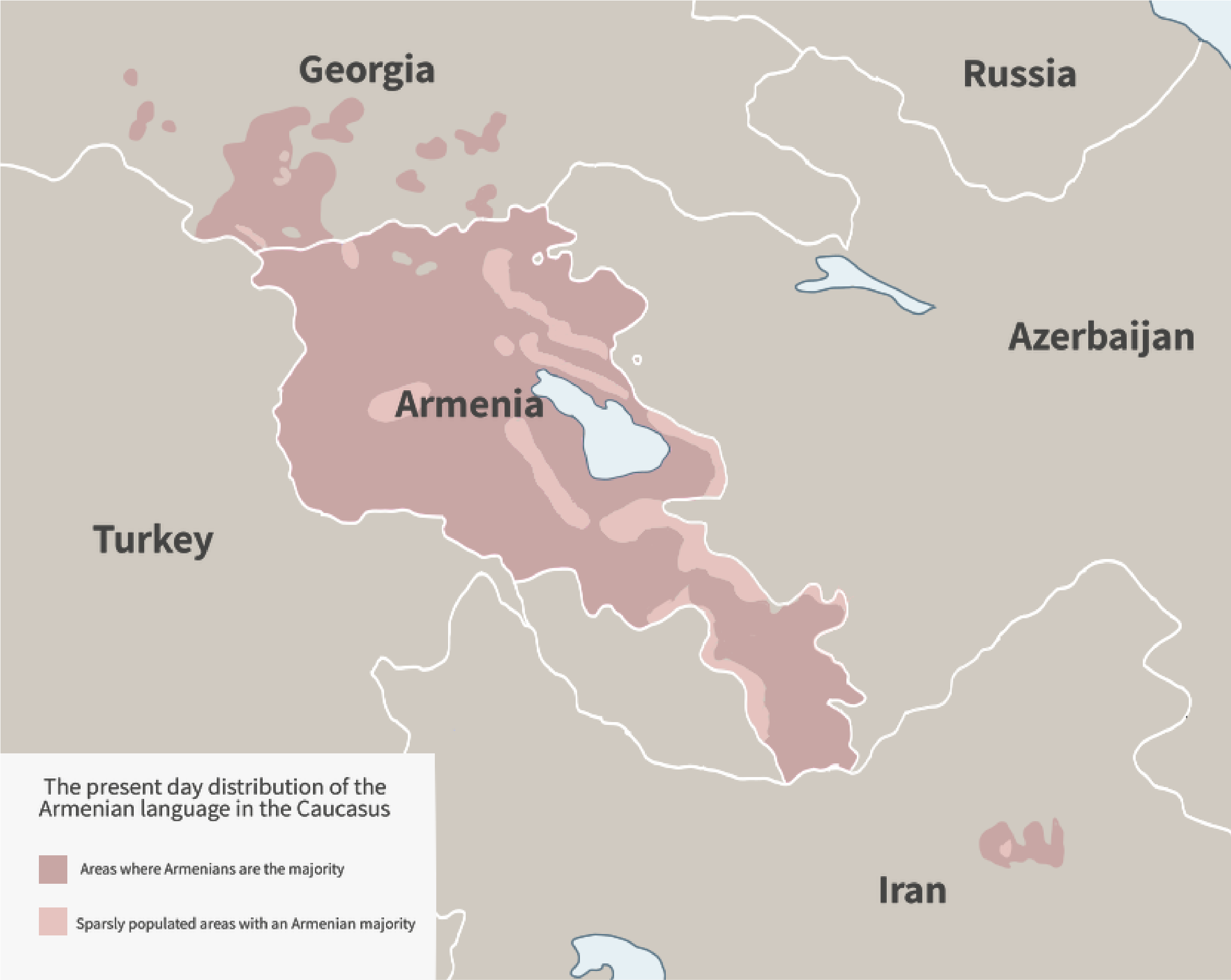
- The current distribution of the Armenian language in the southern Caucasus

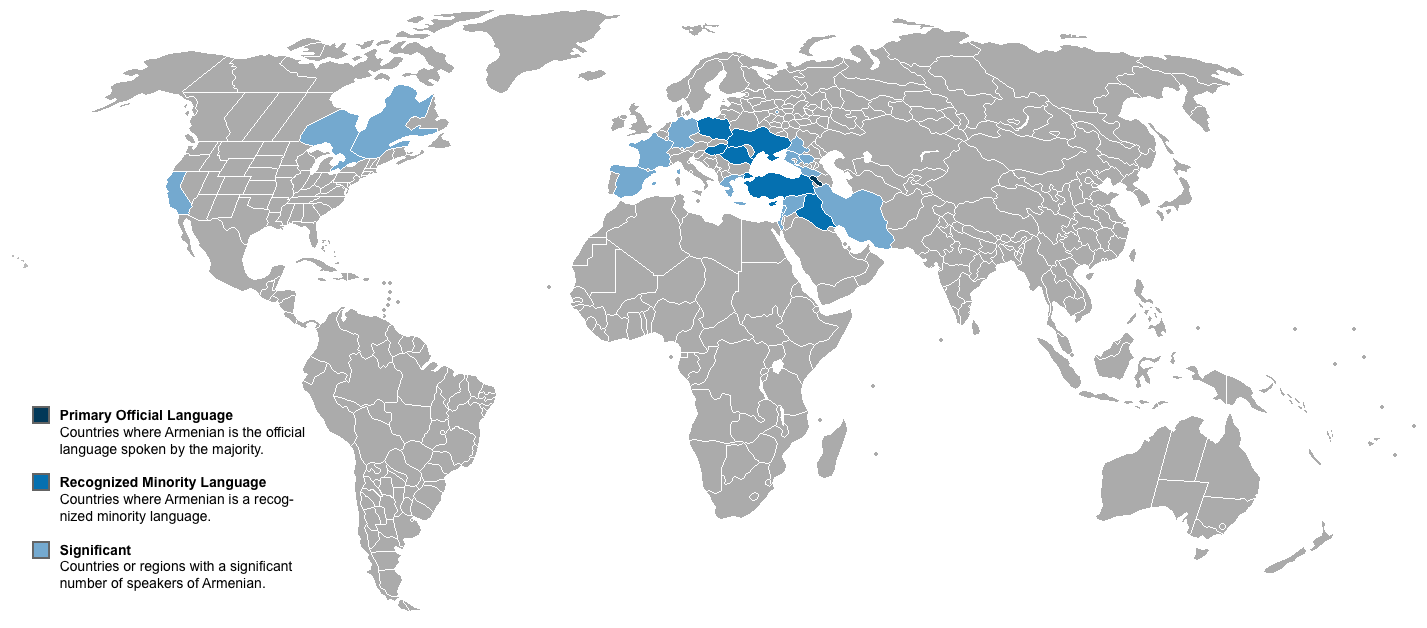
- Official language spoken by the majority Recognized minority language Significant number of speakers

Armenian (endonym: հայերեն, hayeren, pronounced [hɑjɛˈɾɛn]) is the sole member of an independent branch in the Indo-European language family. It is the native language of the Armenian people and the official language of Armenia. Historically spoken in the Armenian highlands, today Armenian is also widely spoken throughout the Armenian diaspora. Armenian is written in its own writing system, the Armenian alphabet, introduced in 405 AD by Mesrop Mashtots. The estimated number of Armenian speakers worldwide is between five and seven million.

== History ==
=== Classification and origins ===
Armenian is an independent branch of the Indo-European languages. It is of interest to linguists because of its distinctive phonological changes within the Indo-European family. Armenian exhibits more satemization than centumization, although it is not classified as belonging to either of these subgroups.

Some linguists have proposed that Armenian, Greek (and Phrygian), Albanian, and the Indo-Iranian languages were dialectally close to one another.Fortson 2004, p. 383 Within this hypothetical dialect continuum, Proto-Armenian has been situated between Proto-Greek, traditionally classified as a centum language, and Proto-Indo-Iranian, traditionally classified as a satem language. The relationship between Armenian and Greek has been the subject of particular attention. Armenian and Greek share phonological, morphological, and lexical features, although scholars differ over whether these similarities reflect a common Graeco-Armenian subgroup, prolonged contact, or a combination of shared inheritance and areal influence. Using computational methods adapted from evolutionary biology, Donald Ringe and Tandy Warnow proposed a phylogenetic model in which Pre-Armenian and Pre-Greek formed a closely related subgroup after 2500 BC. David W. Anthony has likewise suggested that Pre-Armenian may have begun to diverge by approximately 2800 BC.

Recent archaeogenetic research has contributed to discussions of Armenian prehistory. Steppe-related ancestry appeared in the South Caucasus during the Middle Bronze Age, coinciding with the emergence of the Trialeti-Vanadzor culture, and has been linked to a western Yamnaya-related source also found in contemporaneous Aegean populations. Several scholars have associated the Trialeti-Vanadzor culture with Indo-European populations, and some recent studies have proposed it as an early Proto-Armenian cultural horizon. These findings have also been interpreted as supporting the Graeco-Armenian hypothesis and the emergence of Proto-Armenian in the Armenian Highlands during the Bronze Age. Ronald I. Kim has noted unique morphological developments connecting Armenian to the Balto-Slavic languages.

The Armenian language has a long literary history, with a 5th-century Bible translation as its oldest surviving text. Another text translated into Armenian early on, and also in the 5th-century, was the Armenian Alexander Romance. The vocabulary of the language has historically been influenced by Western Middle Iranian languages, particularly Parthian;Livshits 2006, p. 79 its derivational morphology and syntax were also affected by language contact with Parthian, but to a lesser extent. Contact with Greek, Persian, and Syriac also resulted in a number of loanwords. There are two standardized modern literary forms, Eastern Armenian (spoken mainly in Armenia) and Western Armenian (spoken originally mainly in modern-day Turkey and, since the Armenian genocide, mostly in the diaspora). The differences between them are considerable but they are mutually intelligible after significant exposure. Some subdialects, such as Homshetsi, are not mutually intelligible with other varieties.

Although Armenians were known to history much earlier (for example, they were mentioned in the 6th-century BC Behistun Inscription and in Xenophon's 4th century BC history, The Anabasis), the oldest surviving Armenian-language writing is etched in stone on Armenian temples and is called Mehenagir. The Armenian alphabet was created by Mesrop Mashtots in 405, at which time it had 36 letters. He is also credited by some with the creation of the Georgian alphabet and the Caucasian Albanian alphabet.

While Armenian constitutes the sole member of the Armenian branch of the Indo-European family, Aram Kossian has suggested that the hypothetical Mushki language may have been a (now extinct) Armenic language.

=== Early contacts ===
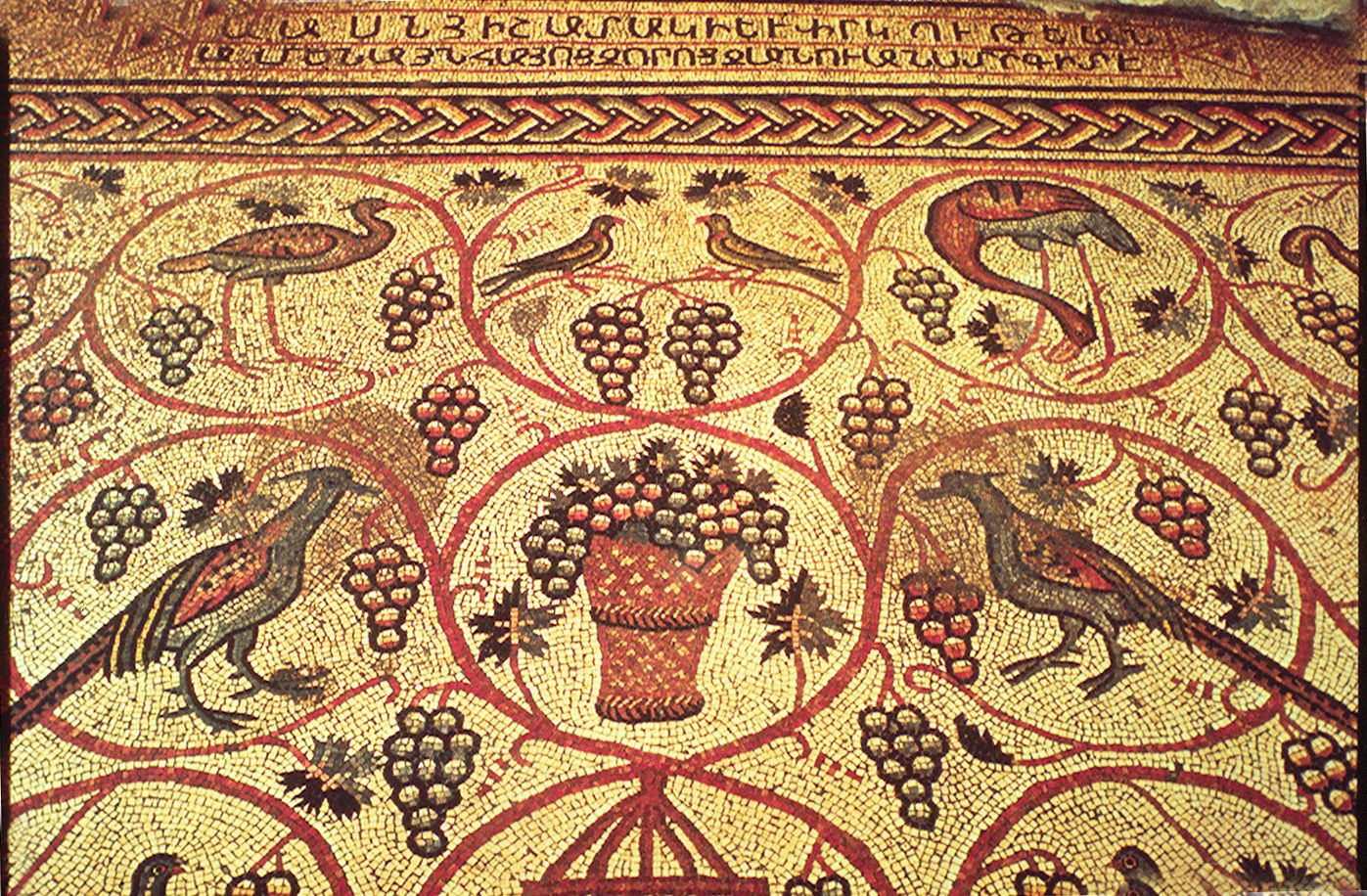
Armenian Birds Mosaic from Jerusalem with Armenian language and alphabet

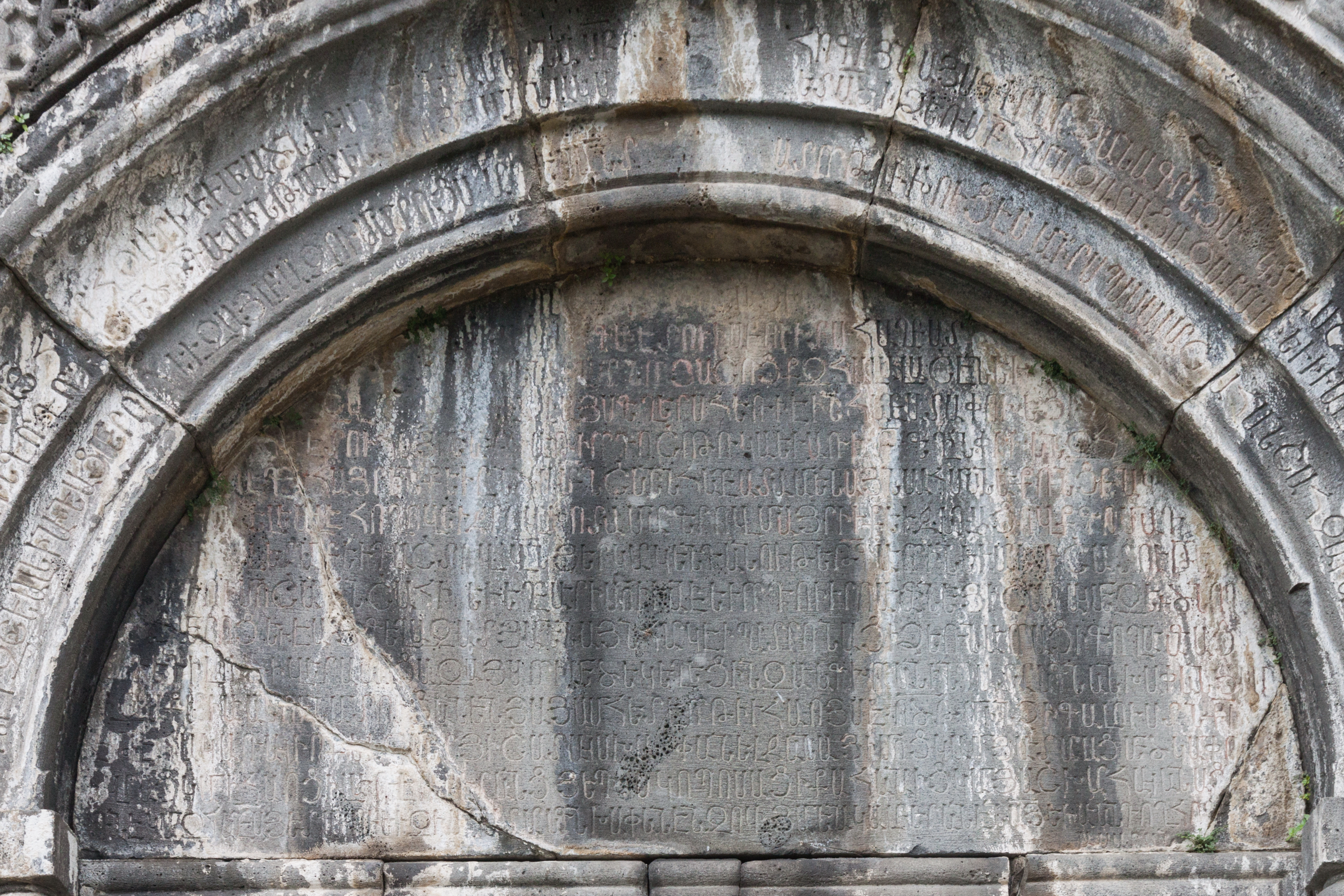
Armenian language writing in Haghpat Monastery

W. M. Austin (1942) concluded that there was early contact between Armenian and Anatolian languages, based on what he considered common archaisms, such as the lack of a feminine gender and the absence of inherited long vowels. Unlike shared innovations (or synapomorphies), the common retention of archaisms (or symplesiomorphy) is not considered conclusive evidence of a period of common isolated development. There are words used in Armenian that are generally believed to have been borrowed from Anatolian languages, particularly from Luwian, although some researchers have identified possible Hittite loanwords as well. One notable loanword from Anatolian is Armenian xalam, "skull", cognate to Hittite ḫalanta, "head".Fortson 2004, p. 337

In 1985, the Soviet linguist Igor M. Diakonoff noted the presence in Classical Armenian of what he calls a "Caucasian substratum" identified by earlier scholars, consisting of loans from the Kartvelian and Northeast Caucasian languages. Noting that Hurro-Urartian-speaking peoples inhabited the Armenian homeland in the second millennium BC, Diakonoff identifies in Armenian a Hurro-Urartian substratum of social, cultural, and animal and plant terms such as ałaxin "slave girl" ( ← Hurr. al(l)a(e)ḫḫenne), cov "sea" ( ← Urart. ṣûǝ "(inland) sea"), ułt "camel" ( ← Hurr. uḷtu), and xnjor "apple (tree)" ( ← Hurr. ḫinzuri). Some of the terms he gives admittedly have an Akkadian or Sumerian provenance, but he suggests they were borrowed through Hurrian or Urartian. Given that these borrowings do not undergo sound changes characteristic of the development of Armenian from Proto-Indo-European, he dates their borrowing to a time before the written record but after the Proto-Armenian language stage.

Contemporary linguists, such as Hrach Martirosyan, have rejected many of the Hurro-Urartian and Northeast Caucasian origins for these words and instead suggest native Armenian etymologies, leaving the possibility that these words may have been loaned into Hurro-Urartian and Caucasian languages from Armenian, and not vice versa. A notable example is arciv, meaning "eagle", believed to have been the origin of Urartian Arṣibi and Northeast Caucasian arzu. This word is derived from Proto-Indo-European *h₂r̥ǵipyós, with cognates in Sanskrit (ऋजिप्य, ṛjipyá), Avestan (ərəzifiia), and Greek (αἰγίπιος, aigípios). Hrach Martirosyan and Armen Petrosyan propose additional borrowed words of Armenian origin loaned into Urartian and vice versa, including grammatical words and parts of speech, such as Urartian eue ("and"), attested in the earliest Urartian texts and likely a loan from Armenian (compare to Armenian եւ yev, ultimately from Proto-Indo-European *h₁epi). Other loans from Armenian into Urartian includes personal names, toponyms, and names of deities. More recent scholarship is even more sceptical, suggesting that fewer than 10 Armenian words are of assuredly Hurro-Urartian origin, and that no secure loans can be established in the other direction.

Further evidence for early contacts involving Armenian comes from the distribution of Indo-European horse terminology and related Wanderwörter. Rasmus G. Bjørn argues that descendants of Proto-Indo-European *h₁eḱwos spread with Armenian across the Caucasus into Southwest Asia in the late 3rd millennium BC, contributing to a widespread Wanderwort attested in early literary languages from Hurrian through Sumerian and Egyptian. He associates this linguistic distribution with the Bronze Age expansion of horses from the Western Steppe Zone, noting that the dated genetic signal for this expansion coincides with the proposed spread of Armenian into the Caucasus. Bjørn further argues that loanwords from a likely early Armenian source preserve evidence for an earlier meaning of Armenian ēš, later attested with the meaning "donkey", and interprets this as a semantic shift from "horse" to "equid". He relates this development to the spread of Armenian into the Hurrian-speaking area in the late 3rd millennium BC and the subsequent introduction of new horse populations associated with Mitanni Aryan speakers in the early 2nd millennium BC. The alternative Sumerian designation for the horse, which can be translated as "donkey of the mountains", is likewise interpreted as evidence for a montane route of entry into Southwest Asia.

Loan words from Iranian languages, along with the other ancient accounts such as that of Xenophon above, initially led some linguists to erroneously classify Armenian as an Iranian language. Scholars such as Paul de Lagarde and F. Müller believed that the similarities between the two languages meant that Armenian belonged to the Iranian language family. The distinctness of Armenian was recognized when philologist Heinrich Hübschmann (1875) used the comparative method to distinguish two layers of Iranian words from the older Armenian vocabulary. He showed that Armenian often had two morphemes for one concept, that the non-Iranian components yielded a consistent Proto-Indo-European pattern distinct from Iranian, and that the inflectional morphology was different from that of Iranian languages.

==== Graeco-Armenian hypothesis ====
The hypothesis that Greek is Armenian's closest living relative originates with Holger Pedersen (1924), who noted that the number of Greek-Armenian lexical cognates is greater than that of agreements between Armenian and any other Indo-European language. Antoine Meillet (1925, 1927) further investigated morphological and phonological agreement and postulated that the parent languages of Greek and Armenian were dialects in immediate geographical proximity during the Proto-Indo-European period. Meillet's hypothesis became popular in the wake of his book Esquisse d'une histoire de la langue latine (1936). Georg Renatus Solta (1960) does not go as far as postulating a Proto-Graeco-Armenian stage, but he concludes that considering both the lexicon and morphology, Greek is clearly the dialect to be most closely related to Armenian. Eric P. Hamp (1976, 91) supports the Graeco-Armenian thesis and even anticipates a time "when we should speak of Helleno-Armenian" (meaning the postulate of a Graeco-Armenian proto-language). Armenian shares the augment and a negator derived from the set phrase in the Proto-Indo-European language *ne h₂oyu kʷid ("never anything" or "always nothing"), the representation of word-initial laryngeals by prothetic vowels, and other phonological and morphological peculiarities with Greek. Nevertheless, as Fortson (2004) comments, "by the time we reach our earliest Armenian records in the 5th century AD, the evidence of any such early kinship has been reduced to a few tantalizing pieces".

==== Greco-Armeno-Aryan hypothesis ====
Graeco-(Armeno)-Aryan is a hypothetical clade within the Indo-European family, ancestral to the Greek language, the Armenian language, and the Indo-Iranian languages. Graeco-Aryan unity would have become divided into Proto-Greek and Proto-Indo-Iranian by the mid-3rd millennium BC. Conceivably, Proto-Armenian would have been located between Proto-Greek and Proto-Indo-Iranian, consistent with the fact that Armenian shares certain features only with Indo-Iranian (the satem change) but others only with Greek (s > h).

Graeco-Aryan has comparatively wide support among Indo-Europeanists who believe the Indo-European homeland to be located in the Armenian Highlands, the "Armenian hypothesis". Early and strong evidence was given by Euler's 1979 examination on shared features in Greek and Sanskrit nominal flection.

Used in tandem with the Graeco-Armenian hypothesis, the Armenian language would also be included under the label Aryano-Greco-Armenic, splitting into Proto-Greek/Phrygian and "Armeno-Aryan" (ancestor of Armenian and Indo-Iranian).

=== Evolution ===
Classical Armenian (Arm: grabar), attested from the 5th century to the 19th century as the literary standard (up to the 11th century also as a spoken language with different varieties), was partially superseded by Middle Armenian, attested from the 12th century to the 18th century. Specialized literature prefers "Old Armenian" for grabar as a whole, and designates as "Classical" the language used in the 5th century literature, "Post-Classical" from the late 5th to 8th centuries, and "Late Grabar" that of the period covering the 8th to 11th centuries. Later, it was used mainly in religious and specialized literature, with the exception of a revival during the early modern period, when attempts were made to establish it as the language of a literary renaissance, with neoclassical inclinations, through the creation and dissemination of literature in varied genres, especially by the Mekhitarists. The first Armenian periodical, Azdarar, was published in grabar in 1794.

The classical form borrowed numerous words from Middle Iranian languages, primarily Parthian, and contains smaller inventories of loanwords from Greek, Syriac, Aramaic,Fortson 2004 Arabic, Mongol, Persian, and indigenous languages such as Urartian. An effort to modernize the language in Bagratid Armenia and the Armenian Kingdom of Cilicia (11–14th centuries) resulted in the addition of two more characters to the alphabet ("օ" and "ֆ"), bringing the total number to 38.

The Book of Lamentations by Gregory of Narek (951–1003) is an example of the development of a literature and writing style of Old Armenian by the 10th century. In addition to elevating the literary style and vocabulary of the Armenian language by adding well above a thousand new words, through his other hymns and poems Gregory paved the way for his successors to include secular themes and vernacular language in their writings. The thematic shift from mainly religious texts to writings with secular outlooks further enhanced and enriched the vocabulary. "A Word of Wisdom", a poem by Hovhannes Sargavak devoted to a starling, legitimizes poetry devoted to nature, love, or female beauty. Gradually, the interests of the population at large were reflected in other literary works as well. Konsdantin Yerzinkatsi and several others took the unusual step of criticizing the ecclesiastic establishment and addressing the social issues of the Armenian homeland. These changes represented the nature of the literary style and syntax, but they did not constitute immense changes to the fundamentals of the grammar or the morphology of the language. Often, when writers codify a spoken dialect, other language users are then encouraged to imitate that structure through the literary device known as parallelism.

In the 19th century, the traditional Armenian homeland was once again divided. This time Eastern Armenia was conquered from Qajar Iran by the Russian Empire, while Western Armenia, containing two thirds of historical Armenia, remained under Ottoman control. The antagonistic relationship between the Russian and Ottoman empires led to creation of two separate and different environments under which Armenians lived. Halfway through the 19th century, two important concentrations of Armenian communities were further consolidated. Because of persecutions or the search for better economic opportunities, many Armenians living under Ottoman rule gradually moved to Istanbul, whereas Tbilisi became the center of Armenians living under Russian rule. These two cosmopolitan cities very soon became the primary poles of Armenian intellectual and cultural life.

The introduction of new literary forms and styles, as well as many new ideas sweeping Europe, reached Armenians living in both regions. This created an ever-growing need to elevate the vernacular, Ashkharhabar, to the dignity of a modern literary language, in contrast to the now-anachronistic Grabar. Numerous dialects existed in the traditional Armenian regions, which, different as they were, had certain morphological and phonetic features in common. On the basis of these features two major standards emerged:

- Western standard: The influx of immigrants from different parts of the traditional Armenian homeland to Istanbul crystallized the common elements of the regional dialects, paving the way for a style of writing that required a shorter and more flexible learning curve than Grabar.
- Eastern standard: The Yerevan dialect provided the primary elements of Eastern Armenian, centered in Tbilisi, Georgia. Similar to the Western Armenian variant, the Modern Eastern was in many ways more practical and accessible to the masses than Grabar.

Both centers vigorously pursued the promotion of Ashkharhabar. The proliferation of newspapers in both versions (Eastern & Western) and the development of a network of schools where modern Armenian was taught, dramatically increased the rate of literacy (in spite of the obstacles by the colonial administrators), even in remote rural areas. The emergence of literary works entirely written in the modern versions increasingly legitimized the language's existence. By the turn of the 20th century both varieties of the one modern Armenian language prevailed over Grabar and opened the path to a new and simplified grammatical structure of the language in the two different cultural spheres. Apart from several morphological, phonetic, and grammatical differences, the largely common vocabulary and generally analogous rules of grammatical fundamentals allows users of one variant to understand the other as long as they are fluent in one of the literary standards.

After World War I, the existence of the two modern versions of the same language was sanctioned even more clearly. The Armenian Soviet Socialist Republic (1920–1990) used Eastern Armenian as its official language, whereas the diaspora created after the Armenian genocide preserved the Western Armenian dialect.

The two modern literary dialects, Western (originally associated with writers in the Ottoman Empire) and Eastern (originally associated with writers in the Russian Empire), removed almost all of their Turkish lexical influences in the 20th century, primarily following the Armenian genocide.

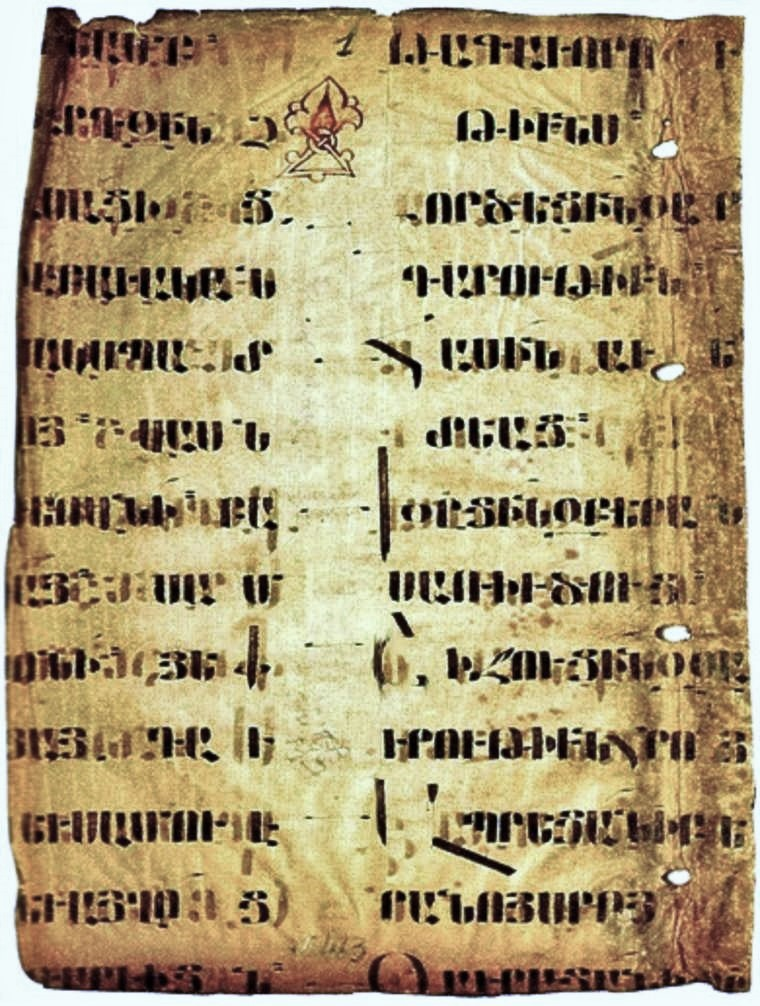
Armenian manuscript, 5th–6th centuries.

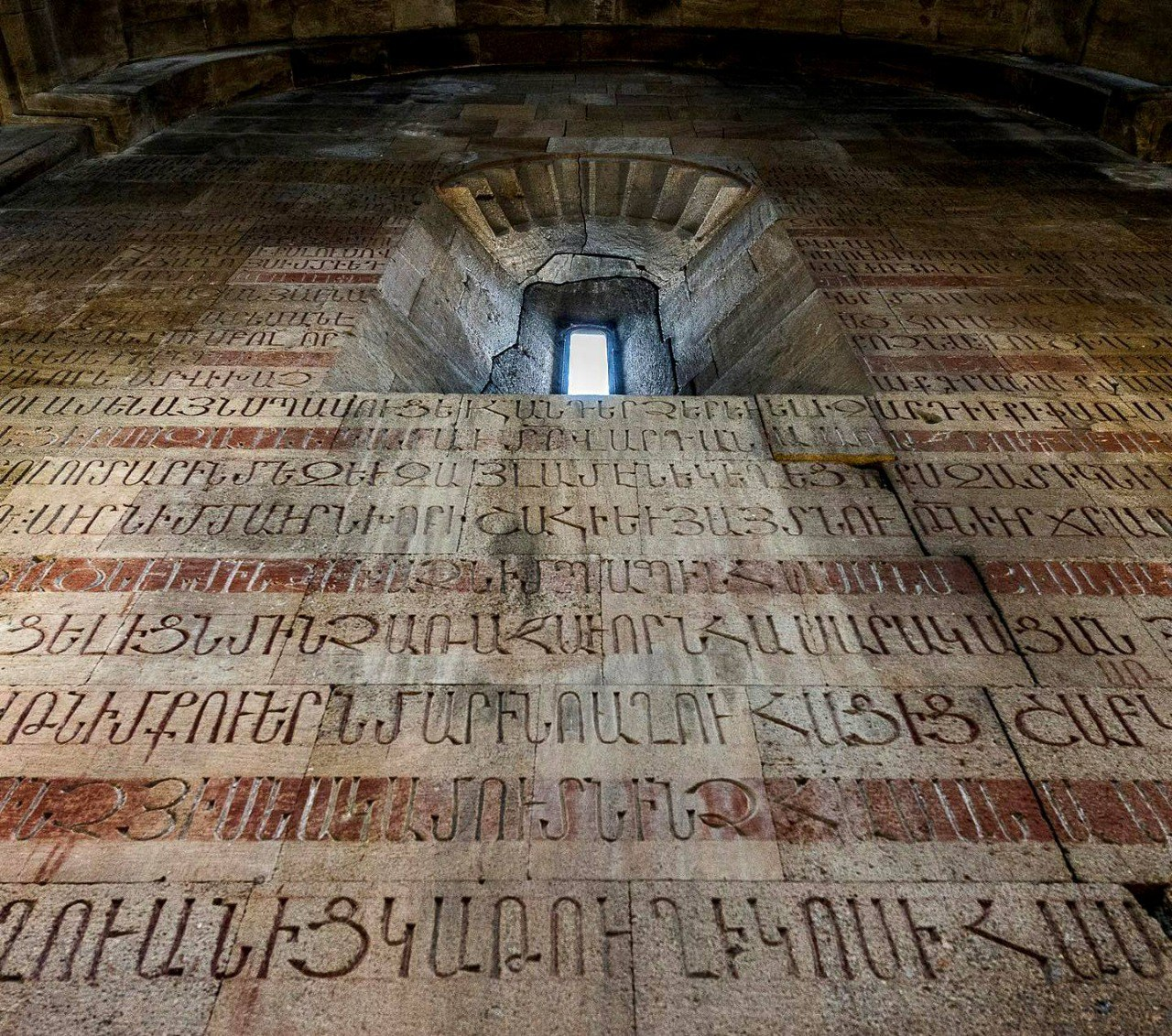
Armenian inscription in Gandzasar Monastery

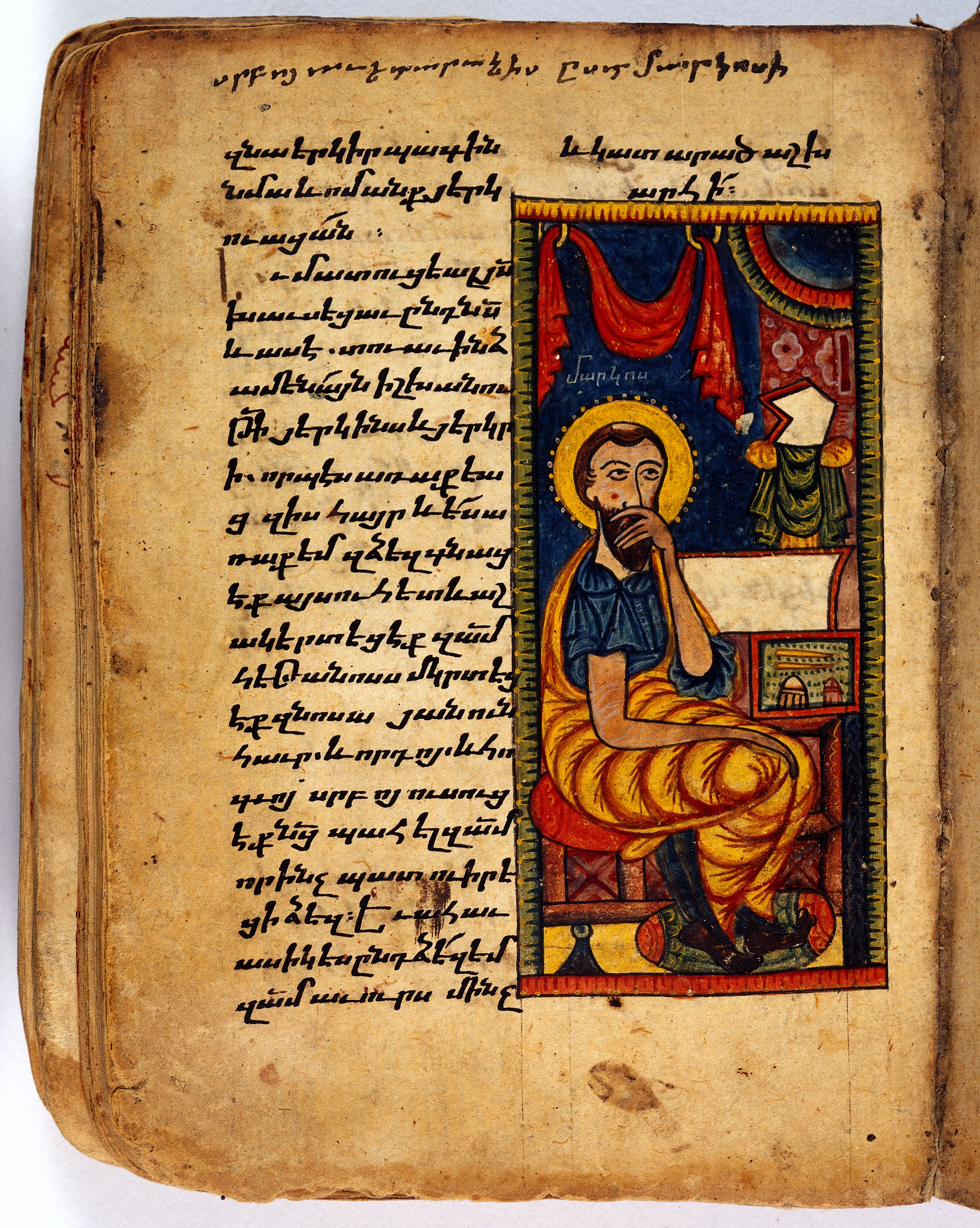
The Four Gospels, 1495, Portrait of St Mark Wellcome with Armenian inscriptions

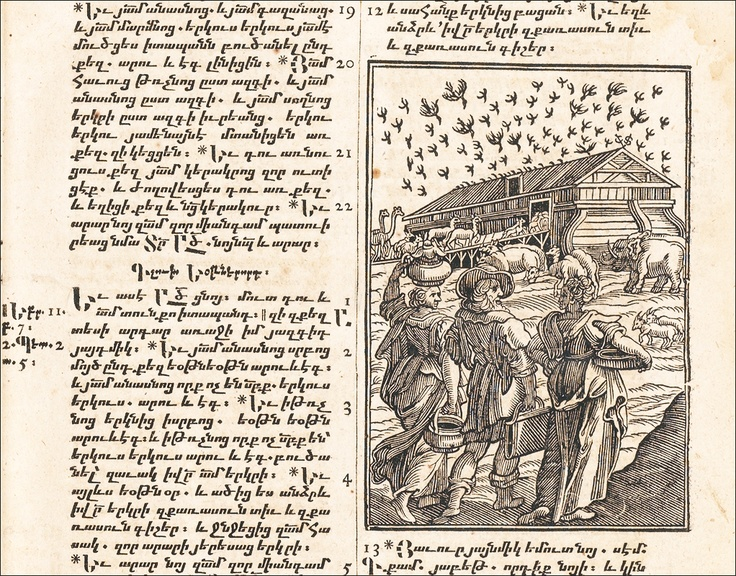
First printed Armenian language Bible, 1666

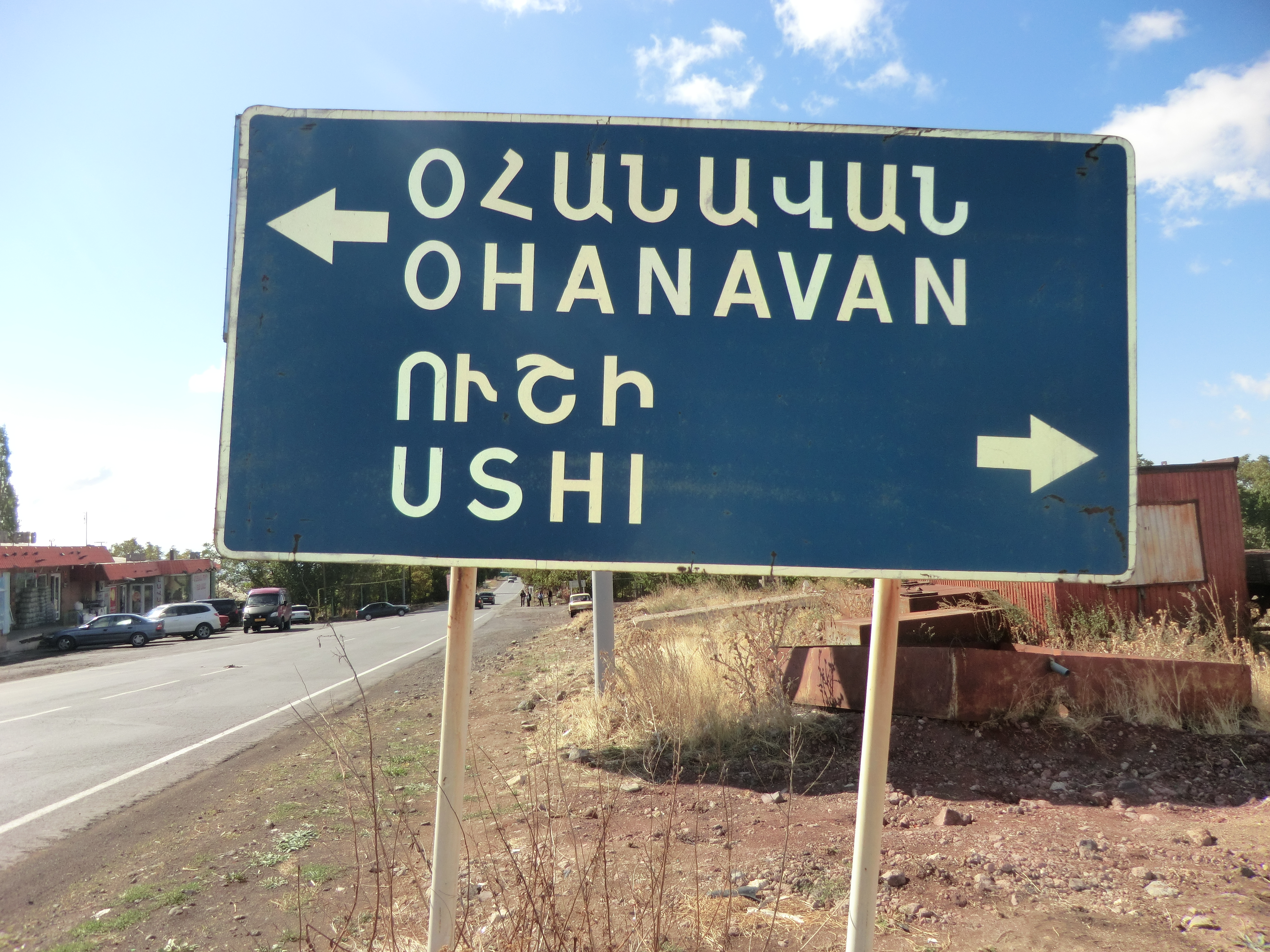
Armenian language road sign

=== Contamination and blending in Armenian etymology ===
The proportion of words in Armenian inherited directly from Proto-Indo-European is lower than in most other Indo-European languages attested before the end of the first millennium AD. The development of Armenian involved numerous sound changes, the validity of several of which remains debated. A notable example is Meillet's proposal that Proto-Indo-European *du̯o- developed into Armenian erk-.

Because of the difficulty in identifying regular sound laws and the presence of apparent exceptions, scholars have often explained certain Armenian words through processes of contamination and blending. Comparable phenomena have been identified in other Indo-European languages; for instance, Georgiev (1979:34) suggested that 250 Slavic words could be explained in this way. A considerable proportion of inherited Armenian vocabulary has at some point been interpreted using contamination and blending, making it a recurrent topic in Armenian historical linguistics.

== Geographic distribution ==
In addition to Armenia and Turkey, where it is indigenous, Armenian is spoken among the diaspora. According to Ethnologue, globally there are 1.6 million Western Armenian speakers and 3.7 million Eastern Armenian speakers, totalling 5.3 million Armenian speakers.

Armenian speakers, Ethnologue (26th ed., 2023) (Note: Only countries with at least 10,000 speakers are listed.)
Country	Armenian speakers	Main variety
Armenia	3,000,000	Eastern
Russia	510,000	Eastern
Lebanon	340,000	Western
United States	240,000	Western
Argentina	150,000	Western
Georgia	150,000	Eastern
Azerbaijan	120,000	Eastern
Iran	110,000	Eastern
Turkmenistan	84,000	Eastern
France	70,000	Western
Iraq	70,000	Western
Turkey	67,000	Western
Uzbekistan	66,000	Eastern
Syria	60,000	Western
Ukraine	50,000	Eastern
Brazil	47,000	Western
Canada	45,000	Western
Germany	27,000	Western
Greece	20,000	Western
Kazakhstan	16,000	Eastern
Spain	12,000	Western
Australia	11,000	Western
Kuwait	11,000	Western
Jordan	10,000	Western

In Georgia, Armenian speakers are concentrated in Ninotsminda and Akhalkalaki districts where they represent over 90% of the population.

== Status and usage ==
The short-lived First Republic of Armenia declared Armenian its official language. Eastern Armenian was then dominating in institutions and among the population. When Armenia was incorporated into the USSR, the Armenian Soviet Socialist Republic made Eastern Armenian the language of the courts, government institutions and schools. Armenia was also russified. After regaining independence Armenia upholds the official status of the Armenian language. Eastern Armenian is the official variant used, making it the prestige variety while other variants have been excluded from national institutions. Indeed, Western Armenian is perceived by some as a mere dialect. Armenian was also official in the Republic of Artsakh. It is recognized as an official language of the Eurasian Economic Union although Russian is the working language.

Armenian (without reference to a specific variety) is officially recognized as a minority language in Cyprus, Hungary, Iraq, Poland, and Romania. It is recognized as a minority language and protected in Turkey by the 1923 Treaty of Lausanne.

Western Armenian is the main language of the Armenian diaspora, and is the medium of instruction in the majority of Armenian-language schools outside Armenia. In particular, although Armenian has no legal status in Georgia, as of 2010 Armenian was the main language of instruction in 144 state-funded schools in the Samtskhe-Javakheti region. The curriculum in Lebanon allows Armenian schools to teach Armenian as a basic language. In California, home to a large Armenian American community, various state government agencies provide Armenian translations of their documents, including the California Department of Social Services, California Department of Motor Vehicles, and California superior courts. In the city of Glendale, there are some street signs in Armenian.

In Lebanon, Syria and Iran, Armenian communities were given greater autonomy than Assyrian, Kurdish, and other communities. In practice, Armenians were the only ethnic minority group in these countries allowed to teach their language in schools. In Iran, article 15 of the constitution allows the use of "regional and tribal languages" in the mass media as well as within the schools. However, these languages do not receive formal status and are not officially regulated by the authorities. Iranian Armenians are de facto the only non-Persian ethnic group in Iran enjoying this right, with private schools where Armenian is the medium of instruction.

== Phonology ==
Spoken Eastern Armenian

Proto-Indo-European voiceless stop consonants are aspirated in the Proto-Armenian language, one of the circumstances that is often linked to the glottalic theory, a version of which postulated that some voiceless occlusives of Proto-Indo-European were aspirated.

=== Stress ===
In Armenian, the stress falls on the last syllable unless the last syllable contains the definite article [ə] or [n], and the possessive articles ս and դ, in which case it falls on the penultimate one. For instance, [ɑχɔɾˈʒɑk], [mɑʁɑdɑˈnɔs], [ɡiˈni] but [vɑˈhɑɡən] and [ˈdɑʃtə]. Exceptions to this rule are some words with the final letter է (ե in the reformed orthography) (մի՛թէ, մի՛գուցե, ո՛րեւէ) and sometimes the ordinal numerals (վե՛ցերորդ, տա՛սներորդ, etc.), as well as նաեւ, նամանաւանդ, հիմա, այժմ, and a small number of other words.

=== Vowels ===
All varieties of Armenian employ only monophthongs. Eastern Armenian has six vowels, while Western Armenian has an additional two front rounded vowels.

	Front		Central	Back
	unr.	rnd.	Central	Back
Close	/i/ ի i	/ʏ/ իւ ü		/u/ ու u
Mid	/ɛ/ ե, է e, ē	/œ/ էօ ö	/ə/ ը ë	/o/ ո, օ o, ō
Open				/ɑ/ ա a

- The use of ⟨է, ե⟩ and ⟨ո, օ⟩ depends on the vowel's context in the word. See the Orthography section below for details.

=== Consonants ===
The following table lists the Eastern Armenian consonantal system. The occlusives and affricates have an aspirated series, commonly transcribed with a reversed apostrophe after the letter. Each phoneme in the table is represented by IPA, Armenian script and romanization.

Eastern Armenian consonant phonemes
		Labial	Dental/Alveolar		Palatal	Velar	Uvular	Glottal
		Labial	plain	sibilant	Palatal	Velar	Uvular	Glottal
Nasal		/m/ մ – m	/n/ ն – n			(ŋ)		
Plosive/ Affricate	voiced	/b/ բ – b	/d/ դ – d	/d͡z/ ձ – j	/d͡ʒ/ ջ – ǰ	/ɡ/ գ – g		
Plosive/ Affricate	tenuis	/p/ պ – p	/t/ տ – t	/t͡s/ ծ – c	/t͡ʃ/ ճ – č	/k/ կ – k		
Plosive/ Affricate	aspirated	/pʰ/ փ – pʻ	/tʰ/ թ – tʻ	/t͡sʰ/ ց – cʻ	/t͡ʃʰ/ չ – čʻ	/kʰ/ ք – kʻ		
Fricative	voiceless	/f/ ֆ – f		/s/ ս – s	/ʃ/ շ – š	/x ~ χ/ խ – x		/h/ հ – h
Fricative	voiced	/v/ վ – v		/z/ զ – z	/ʒ/ ժ – ž	/ɣ ~ ʁ/ ղ – ġ		
Approximant		(ʋ)	/l/ լ – l		/j/ յ – y			
Vibrant	trill		/r/ ռ – ṙ					
Vibrant	tap		/ɾ/ ր – r					

- /ŋ/ occurs before velars.
- /pʰ p b/ in Eastern Armenian dialects generally correspond to /pʰ b pʰ/ in Western dialects (more detailed table given below).
- Some of the dialects may realize the tenuis stops as ejectives.
- Sources differ on the place of articulation of the dorsal fricatives.

The major phonetic difference between dialects is in the reflexes of Classical Armenian voice-onset time. The seven dialect types have the following correspondences, illustrated with the t–d series:

Correspondence in initial position
Armenian letter	Թ	Տ	Դ
Indo-European	*t	*d	*dʰ
Karin, Sebastia	tʰ	d	dʱ
Istanbul	tʰ	d	
Kharberd, Middle Armenian	tʰ	d	t
Malatya, SWA	tʰ	d	tʰ
Classical Armenian, Agulis, SEA, Yerevan	tʰ	t	d
Van, Artsakh	tʰ	t	

== Morphology ==
Armenian corresponds to other Indo-European languages in structure, but it shares distinctive sounds and grammatical features with neighboring languages of the Caucasus region. Armenian orthography is rich in consonant clusters, but in pronunciation, they are broken up with schwas. Both classical Armenian and the modern spoken and literary dialects have a system of noun declensions, with six or seven cases but no gender. In modern Armenian, the use of auxiliary verbs to show tense (comparable to "will" in "he will go") has generally supplanted the inflected verbs of Classical Armenian. Negative verbs are conjugated differently from positive ones (as in English "he goes" and "he does not go") in many tenses, otherwise adding only the negative չ to the positive conjugation. Grammatically, early forms of Armenian had much in common with classical Greek and Latin, but the modern language has undergone many analytic transformations like modern Greek.

=== Nouns ===
Armenian has no grammatical gender, not even in pronouns, but there is a feminine suffix (-ուհի "-uhi") which has no grammatical effect. For example, ուսուցիչ (usucʻičʻ, "teacher") becomes ուսուցչուհի (usucʻčʻuhi, female teacher). The nominal inflection preserves several types of inherited stem classes. Historically, nouns were declined for one of seven cases: nominative (ուղղական uġġakan), accusative (հայցական haycʻakan), locative (ներգոյական nergoyakan), genitive (սեռական seṙakan), dative (տրական trakan), ablative (բացառական bacʻaṙakan), or instrumental (գործիական gorciakan), but in the modern language, the nominative and accusative cases, as well as the dative and genitive cases, have merged.

Examples of noun declension in Eastern Armenian

Հեռախոս Heṙaxos (telephone)
Case	Singular	Plural
Nominative/ Accusative	հեռախոս(ը/ն)* heṙaxos(ë/n)*	հեռախոսներ(ը/ն)* heṙaxosner(ë/n)*
Genitive/ Dative	հեռախոսի(ն) heṙaxosi(n)	հեռախոսների(ն) heṙaxosneri(n)
Ablative	հեռախոսից heṙaxosicʻ	հեռախոսներից heṙaxosnericʻ
Instrumental	հեռախոսով heṙaxosov	հեռախոսներով heṙaxosnerov
Locative	հեռախոսում heṙaxosum	հեռախոսներում heṙaxosnerum

Մայր Mayr (mother)
Case	Singular	Plural
Nominative/ Accusative	մայր(ը/ն)* mayr(ë/n)*	մայրեր(ը/ն)* mayrer(ë/n)*
Genitive/ Dative	մոր(ը/ն)* mor(ë/n)*	մայրերի(ն) mayreri(n)
Ablative	մորից moricʻ	մայրերից mayrericʻ
Instrumental	մորով morov	մայրերով mayrerov

Which case the direct object takes is split based on animacy (a phenomenon more generally known as differential object marking). Inanimate nouns take the nominative, while animate nouns take the dative. Additionally, animate nouns can never take the locative case.

Հանրապետություն Hanrapetut'yun (republic)
Case	Singular	Plural
Nominative/ Accusative	հանրապետություն(ը/ն)* hanrapetutʻyun(ë/n)*	հանրապետություններ(ը/ն)* hanrapetutʻyunner(ë/n)*
Genitive/ Dative	հանրապետության(ը/ն)* hanrapetutʻyan(ë/n)*	հանրապետությունների(ն) hanrapetutʻyunneri(n)
Ablative	հանրապետությունից hanrapetutʻyunicʻ	հանրապետություններից hanrapetut'yunnericʻ
Instrumental	հանրապետությամբ hanrapetutʻyamb	հանրապետություններով hanrapetutʻyunnerov
Locative	հանրապետությունում hanrapetut'yunum	հանրապետություններում hanrapetut'yunnerum

Examples of noun declension in Western Armenian

	դաշտ tašd (field)		կով gov (cow)	
	singular	plural	singular	plural
Nom-Acc (Ուղղական-Հայցական)	դաշտ tašd	դաշտեր tašder	կով gov	կովեր gover
Gen-Dat (Սեռական-Տրական)	դաշտի tašdi	դաշտերու tašderu	կովու govu	կովերու goveru
Abl (Բացառական)	դաշտէ tašdē	դաշտերէ tašderē	կովէ govē	կովերէ goverē
Instr (Գործիական)	դաշտով tašdov	դաշտերով tašderov	կովով govov	կովերով goverov

	գարուն karun (spring)		օր ōr (day)		Քոյր koyr (sister)	
	singular	plural	singular	plural	singular	plural
Nom-Acc (Ուղղական-Հայցական)	գարուն karun	գարուններ karunner	օր ōr	օրեր ōrer	քոյր koyr	քոյրեր koyrer
Gen-Dat (Սեռական-Տրական)	գարնան karnan	գարուններու karunneru	օրուայ ōruay	օրերու ōreru	քրոջ kroč	քոյրերու koyreru
Abl (Բացառական)	գարունէ karunē	գարուններէ karunnerē	օրուընէ ōruënē	օրերէ ōrerē	քրոջմէ kročmē	քոյրերէ koyrerē
Instr (Գործիական)	գարունով karunov	գարուններով karunnerov	օրով ōrov	օրերով ōrerov	քրոջմով kročmov	քոյրերով kuyrerov

	հայր / hayr (father)		Աստուած / Asdvaj (God)		գիտութիւն / kidutiwn (science)	
	singular	plural	singular	plural	singular	plural
Nom-Acc (Ուղղական-Հայցական)	հայր hayr	հայրեր hayrer	Աստուած; Asdvaj	աստուածներ Asdvajner	գիտութիւն kidutiwn	գիտութիւններ kidutiwnner
Gen-Dat (Սեռական-Տրական)	հօր hōr	հայրերու hayreru	Աստուծոյ; Asdujoy	աստուածներու Asdvajneru	գիտութեան kidutean	գիտութիւններու / գիտութեանց kidutiunneru / kiduteancʻ
Abl (Բացառական)	հօրմէ hōrmē	հայրերէ hayrerē	Աստուծմէ; Asdujmē	աստուածներէ Asdvajnerē	գիտութենէ kidutenē	գիտութիւններէ kidutiwnnerē
Instr (Գործիական)	հօրմով hōrmov	հայրերով hayrerov	Աստուծմով; Asdujmov	աստուածներով Asdvajnerov	գիտութեամբ / գիտութիւնով kiduteamp / kidutiwnov	գիտութիւններով kidutiwnnerov

=== Verbs ===
Verbs in Armenian have an expansive system of conjugation with two main verb types in Eastern Armenian and three in Western Armenian changing form based on tense, mood and aspect.

=== Word order ===
Armenian word is relatively free, where basic word order is either subject-object-verb or subject-verb-object.

== Dialects ==
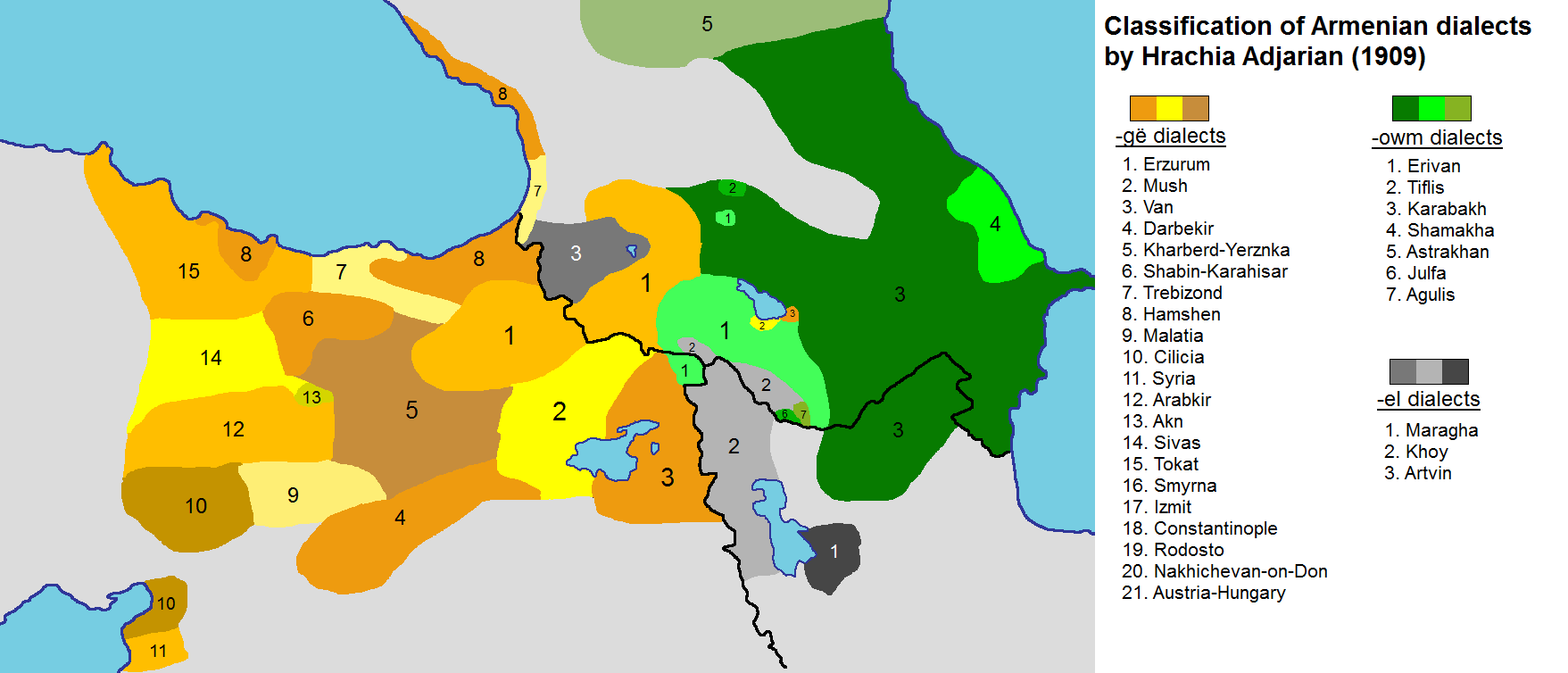
Map of the Armenian dialects in early 20th century: -owm dialects, nearly corresponding to Eastern Armenian -el dialects (intermediate) -gë dialects, nearly corresponding to Western Armenian

Armenian is a pluricentric language, having two modern standardized forms: Eastern Armenian and Western Armenian. There are also numerous other non-standard dialects, many of which are extinct. The most distinctive feature of Western Armenian is that it has undergone several phonetic mergers; these may be due to proximity to Arabic- and Turkish-speaking communities.

A man speaking in Western Armenian

Classical Armenian (Grabar), which remained the standard until the 18th century, was quite homogeneous across the different regions that works in it were written; it may have been a cross-regional standard.Fortson 2004, pp. 338–340 The Middle Armenian variety used in the court of Cilician Armenia (1080–1375) provides a window into the development of Western Armenian, which came to be based on what became the dialect of Istanbul, while the standard for Eastern Armenian was based on the dialect around Mount Ararat and Yerevan.Fortson 2004, pp. 338–340 Although the Armenian language is often divided into "east" and "west", the two standards are actually relatively close to each other in light of wealth of the diversity present among regional non-standard Armenian dialects. The different dialects have experienced different degrees of language contact effects, often with Turkic and Caucasian languages; for some, the result has been significant phonological and syntactic changes.Fortson 2004, pp. 338–340 Fortson notes that the modern standard as well has now attained a subordinate clausal structure that greatly resembles a Turkic language.Fortson 2004, p. 340

Eastern Armenian speakers pronounce (թ) as [tʰ], (դ) as [d], and (տ) as a tenuis occlusive [t˭]. Western Armenian has simplified the occlusive system into a simple division between voiced occlusives and aspirated ones; the first series corresponds to the tenuis series of Eastern Armenian, and the second corresponds to the Eastern voiced and aspirated series. Thus, the Western dialect pronounces both (թ) and (դ) as [tʰ], and the (տ) letter as [d].

There is no precise linguistic border between one dialect and another because there is nearly always a dialect transition zone of some size between pairs of geographically identified dialects.

Armenian can be divided into two major dialectal blocks and those blocks into individual dialects, though many of the Western Armenian dialects have become extinct due to the effects of the Armenian genocide. In addition, neither dialect is completely homogeneous: any dialect can be subdivided into several subdialects. Although Western and Eastern Armenian are often described as different dialects of the same language, many subdialects are not readily mutually intelligible. Nevertheless, a fluent speaker of one of two greatly varying dialects who is also literate in one of the standards, when exposed to the other dialect for a period of time will be able to understand the other with relative ease.

Distinct Western Armenian varieties currently in use include Homshetsi, spoken by the Hemshin peoples; the dialects of Armenians of Kessab (Քեսապի բարբառ), Latakia and Jisr al-Shughur (Syria), Anjar, Lebanon, and Vakıflı, Samandağ (Turkey), part of the "Sueidia" dialect (Սուէտիայի բարբառ).

Forms of the Karin dialect of Western Armenian are spoken by several hundred thousand people in Northern Armenia, mostly in Gyumri, Artik, Akhuryan, and around 130 villages in Shirak Province, and by Armenians in Samtskhe–Javakheti province of Georgia (Akhalkalaki, Akhaltsikhe).

Nakhichevan-on-Don Armenians speak another Western Armenian variety based on the dialect of Armenians in Crimea, where they came from in order to establish the town and surrounding villages in 1779 (Նոր Նախիջևանի բարբառ).

Western Armenian dialects are currently spoken also in Gavar (formerly Nor Bayazet and Kamo, on the western shore of Lake Sevan), Aparan, and Talin in Armenia (Mush dialect), and by the large Armenian population residing in Abkhazia, where they are considered to be the first or second ethnic minority, or even equal in number to the local Abkhaz population.

Examples
English	Eastern Armenian	Western Armenian
Yes	Ayo (Այո)	Ayo (Այո)
No	Vočʻ (Ոչ)	Voč (Ոչ)
I see you	Yes kʻez tesnum em (Ես քեզ տեսնում եմ)	Yes kez(i) gë desnem (Ես քեզ(ի) կը տեսնեմ)
Hello	Barev (Բարեւ)	Parev (Բարեւ)
I'm going	Gnum em (Գնում եմ)	G'ertam (gor) (Կ՚երթամ (կոր))
Come!	Ari! (Արի՛)	Yegur! (Եկո՛ւր)
I will eat	Utelu em (Ուտելու եմ)	Bidi udem (Պիտի ուտեմ)
I must do	Piti/petkʻ ē anem (Պիտի/պետք է անեմ)	Bēdk ē ënem (Պէտք է ընեմ)
I was going to eat	Utelu ēi (Ուտելու էի)	Bidi udēi (Պիտի ուտէի)
Is this yours?	Sa kʻonn ē? (Սա քո՞նն է)	Asiga kugt ē? (Ասիկա քո՞ւկդ է)
His grandma	Nra tatikë (Նրա տատիկը)	Anor nēnēn / mej maman (Անոր նէնէն / մեծ մաման)
Look at that one!	Dran nayir (Դրան նայիր)	Ador nayē / Anor nayē (Ատոր նայէ / Անոր նայէ)
Have you brought these?	Du es berel srankʻ? (Դո՞ւ ես բերել սրանք)	Asonk tun peraj es? (Ասոնք դո՞ւն բերած ես)
How are you? I'm fine.	Inčʻpes es? / Voncʻ es? Lav em (Ինչպե՞ս ես։ / Ո՞նց ես։ Լավ եմ։)	Inčbēs es? Lav em (Ինչպէ՞ս ես։ Լաւ եմ։)
Did you say it? Say it!	Du asacʻir (asecʻir)? Asa! (Դո՞ւ ասացիր (ասեցիր): Ասա՛։)	Tun ësir? Ësē! (Դո՞ւն ըսիր։ Ըսէ՛։)
Have you taken it from us?	Mezanicʻ es vercʻrel? (Մեզանի՞ց ես վերցրել)	Mezmē araj es? (Մեզմէ՞ առած ես)
Good morning	Bari luys (Բարի լույս)	Pari luys (Բարի լոյս)
Good evening	Bari yereko (Բարի երեկո)	Pari irigun / Parirgun (Բարի իրիկուն / Բարիրկուն)
Good night	Bari gišer (Բարի գիշեր)	Kišer pari (Գիշեր բարի)
You love me	Sirum es inj (Սիրում ես ինձ)	Inji gë sires (Ինծի կը սիրես)
I am Armenian	Yes hay em (Ես հայ եմ)	Yes hay em (Ես հայ եմ)
I missed you	Karotel em kʻez (Կարոտել եմ քեզ)	Garōdcay kezi (Կարօտցայ քեզի)

== Orthography ==
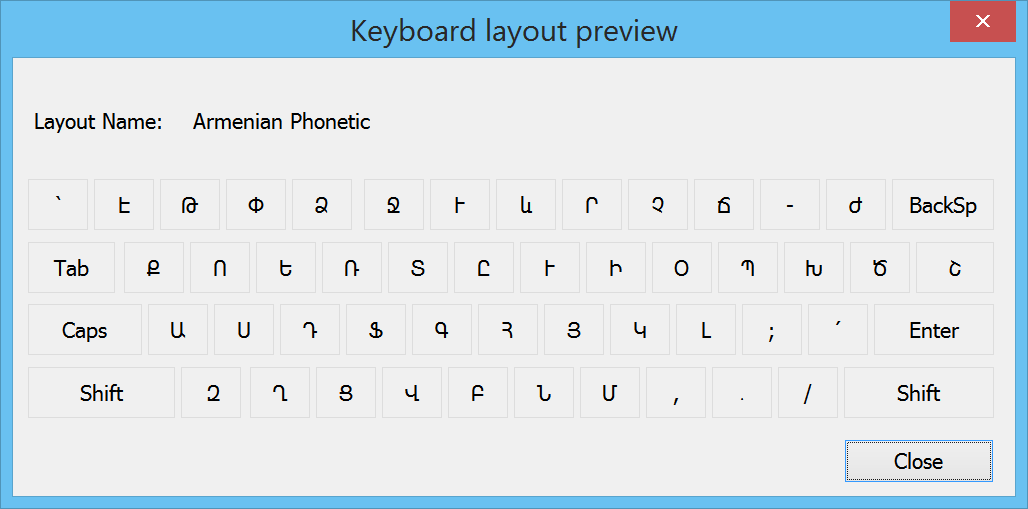
Armenian keyboard layout using the Armenian alphabet.

The Armenian alphabet (Armenian: Հայոց գրեր, romanized: Hayots grer or Armenian: Հայոց այբուբեն, romanized: Hayots aybuben) is a graphically unique alphabetical writing system that is used to write the Armenian language. It was introduced around 405 AD by Mesrop Mashtots, an Armenian linguist and ecclesiastical leader, and originally contained 36 letters. Two more letters, օ (ō) and ֆ (f), were added in the Middle Ages.

During the 1920s orthography reform in Soviet Armenia, a new letter և (capital ԵՎ) was added, which was a ligature before ե+ւ, whereas the letter Ւ ւ was discarded and reintroduced as part of a new letter ՈՒ ու (which was a digraph before). This alphabet and associated orthography is used by most Armenian speakers of Armenia and the countries of the former Soviet Union. Neither the alphabet nor the orthography has been adopted by Diaspora Armenians, including Eastern Armenian speakers of Iran and all Western Armenian speakers, who keep using the traditional alphabet and spelling.

== Vocabulary ==
=== Indo-European cognates ===
Armenian is an Indo-European language, with many of its Proto-Indo-European-descended words being cognates of words in other Indo-European languages such as English, Latin, Greek, and Sanskrit.

Due to extensive loaning, only around 1,500 words (G. Jahukyan) are known to have been inherited from Indo-European by the Classical Armenian stage; the rest were lost, a fact that presents a major challenge to endeavors to better understand Proto-Armenian and its place within the family, especially as many of the sound changes along the way from Indo-European to Armenian remain quite difficult to analyze.Fortson 2004, p. 338

This table lists some of the more recognizable cognates that Armenian shares with English words descended from Old English.

Armenian	English	Latin	Classical and Hellenistic Greek	Persian	Sanskrit	Russian	Old Irish	PIE
մայր mayr "mother"	mother ( ← OE mōdor)	māter	μήτηρ mētēr	مادر mâdar	मातृ mātṛ	мать mat'	máthair	*méh₂tēr "mother"
հայր hayr "father"	father ( ← OE fæder)	pater	πατήρ patēr	پدر pedar	पितृ pitṛ		athair	*ph₂tḗr "father"
եղբայր eġbayr "brother"	brother ( ← OE brōþor)	frāter	φράτηρ phrātēr "brother-in-arms, comrade"	برادر barâdar	भ्रातृ bhrātṛ	брат brat	bráthair	*bʰréh₂tēr "brother"
դուստր dustr "daughter"	daughter ( ← OE dohtor)	(Oscan futrei)	θυγάτηρ thugátēr	دختر doxtar	दुहितृ duhitṛ	дочь doč'	der, Dar- "daughter (of)"	*dʰugh₂tḗr "daughter"
կին kin "woman, wife"	queen ( ← OE cwēn "queen, woman, wife")		γυνή gunē	زن zan	ग्ना gnā/ जनि jani	жена žena "wife"	ben "woman"	*gʷḗn "woman, wife"
իմ im "my, mine"	my, mine ( ← OE min)	me-us, -a, -um etc.	ἐμ-ός, -ή, -όν em-ós, -ē, -ón etc.	من، ـم man,-am	मम mama	мой moy	mo "my, me"	*h₁me- "my, mine"
անուն anun "name"	name ( ← OE nama)	nōmen	ὄνομα ónoma	نام nâm	नामन् nāman	имя im'a	ainm	*h₃nom-n̥- "name"
յոթ yotʻ ( ← եաւթն "eawtʻn") "seven"	seven ( ← OE seofon)	septem	ἑπτά heptá	هفت haft	सप्तन् saptán	семь sem'	secht	*septḿ̥ "seven"
ութ utʻ "eight"	eight ( ← OE eahta)	octō	ὀκτώ óktō	هشت hašt	अष्ट aṣṭa	во́семь vosem'	ocht	*oḱtṓw "eight"
ինն inn "nine"	nine ( ← OE nigon)	novem	ἐννέα ennéa	نه noh	नवन् navan	де́вять dev'at'	noí	*h₁néwn̥ "nine"
տասը tas (<տասն "tasn") "ten"	ten ( ← OE tien) ( ← P.Gmc. *tehun)	decem	δέκα déka	ده dah	दश daśa	де́сять des'at'	deich	*déḱm̥ "ten"
աչք ačʻkʻ "eye"	eye ( ← OE ēge)	oculus	ὀφθαλμός ophthalmós	Avestan 𐬀𐬱𐬌 (aši, "eyes")	अक्षि akṣi	око oko (archaic)		*H₃okʷ- "to see"
արմունկ armunk (<*h₂(e)rH-mo-+ -ուկն) "elbow"	arm ( ← OE earm "joined body parts below shoulder")	armus "shoulder"	ἁρμός harmós "a joint"	ارم arm "arm" (archaic)	ईर्म īrma "arm"	рамя ram'a "shoulder" (archaic)		*h₂er- "fit, join (that which is fitted together)"
ծունկ cunk "knee"	knee ( ← OE cnēo)	genū	γόνυ gónu	زانو zânu	जानु jānu		glún	*ǵénu- "knee"
ոտք otkʻ "foot, leg"	foot ( ← OE fōt)	pēs, pedis	πούς, πόδος poús, pódos	پا، پای pâ, pây "foot"	पाद् pād "foot"		(Gaul. ades "feet")	*pod-, *ped- "foot, leg"
սիրտ sirt "heart"	heart ( ← OE heorte)	cor, cordis	καρδία kardía	دل del	हृदय hṛdaya	се́рдце serdce	cride	*ḱerd- "heart"
մուկ muk "mouse"	mouse ( ← OE mūs)	mūs, mūris	μῦς mûs "mouse, muscle"	موش muš	मूष् mūṣ	мышь myš'		*múh₂s "mouse, muscle"
կով kov "cow"	cow ( ← OE cū)	bōs, bovis	βοῦς boûs	گاو gâv	गो go	говядина gov'adina "beef"	bó	*gʷṓws "cow"
շուն šun "dog"	hound ( ← OE hund "hound, dog")	canis	κύων kúōn	سگ sag	श्वन् śvan	сука suka (Note: etymology debated, see) "bitch"	cú	*ḱwṓ "hound, dog"
ամիս amis "month"	moon, month ( ← OE mōnaþ)	mēnsis	μήν mēn "moon, month"	ماه mâh "moon, month"	मास māsa "moon, month"	месяц mes'ac	mí	*meH₁ns- "moon, month"
ամառ amaṙ ( ← Proto-Armenian *sm̥h₂er-m̥ <*s(e)m-eh₂-) "summer"	summer ( ← OE sumor)			هامین hâmin (archaic)	समा samā "season"		sam "summer"	*semh₂- "summer, hot season"
ջերմ ǰerm "warm"	warm ( ← OE wearm)	formus	θερμός thermós	گرم garm	घर्म gharma "heat"	жарко žarko "hot"	geirid "warm (v)"	*gʷʰerm- "warm"
լույս luys "light"	light ( ← OE lēoht "brightness")	lūx	λευκός leukós "bright, shining, white"	روز ruz "day"	रोक roka	луч luč' "beam"	lóch "bright"	*leuk- "light, brightness"
հուր hur "flame"	fire ( ← OE fȳr)	(Umbrian pir "fire")	πῦρ pûr "fire"			пожа́р požar "wildfire"		*péh₂wr̥ "fire"
հեռու heṙu "far"	far ( ← OE feor "to a great distance")	per "through"	πέρα péra "beyond"	فرا farâ "forward"	परस् paras "beyond"	пере- pere- "through", про- pro- "forth"	íre "further"	*per- "through, across, beyond"
լվանալ lvanal "to wash"	flow ( ← OE flōwan)	pluĕre "to rain"	πλύνω plúnō "I wash"		प्लु plu "to float, swim"	плавать plavat' "swim"	luí "rudder"	*pleu- "to flow, float, wash"
ուտել utel "to eat"	eat ( ← OE etan)	edō	ἔδω édō		अद्मि admi	есть jest'	ithid	*h₁ed- "to eat"
գիտեմ gitem "I know"	wit ( ← OE wit, witan "intelligence, to know")	vidēre "to see"	οἶδα oîda	ویده vida "knowledge"	विद् vid	видеть videt' "see, understand"	adfet "tells"	*weyd- "to see"
գետ get "river"	water ( ← OE wæter)	(Umbrian utur "water")	ὕδωρ húdōr "water"	bārān باران "rain"	उदन् udan "water"	вода voda "water"	uisce "water"	*(*wodor, *wedor, *uder-) from *wed- "water"
գործ gorc "work"	work ( ← OE weorc)		ἔργον érgon	ورز varz		гора gora "mountain" (climbing is work)		*werǵ- "to work"
մեծ mec "big, great"	much ( ← OE mycel "great, big, many")	magnus	μέγας mégas	مه، مهست meh, mahest	मह maha	много mnogo "many"	maige "great, mighty"	*meǵ- "great"
ճանաչել čanačʻel' ( ← *ծանաչել canačʻel) "to recognize"	know ( ← OE cnawan)	nōscere "to learn, recognize"	γιγνώσκω gignōskō "I know"	شناختن šenâxtan "to know"	जानाति jānāti "to know"	знать znat' "to know"	ad·gnin "to know"	*ǵneH₃- "to know"
մեռնել meṙnel "to die"	murder ( ← OE morþor)	morī	βροτός brotós "mortal"	مردن mordan "death"	मरति marati	мереть meret'	marb "dead"	*mer- "to die"
միջին miǰin "middle"	mid, middle ( ← OE mid, middel)	medius	μέσος mésos	میان miyân	मध्य madhya	меж mež "between"	mide	*médʰyos from *me- "mid, middle"
այլ ayl "other"	else ( ← OE elles "other, otherwise, different")	alius	ἄλλος állos				aile "other"	*h₂élyos "other"
նոր nor "new"	new ( ← OE nīwe)	novus	νέος néos	نو now	नव nava	новый novyj	núae	*néwo- "new"
դուռ duṙ "door"	door ( ← OE dor, duru)	foris	θύρα thúrā	در dar	द्वार dvāra	дверь dver'	dorus	*dʰwer- "door, doorway, gate"
տուն tun "house"	town, timber ( ← OE timber "trees used for building material, structure")	domus	δόμος domos	mān مان "house" Avestan: dąm 𐬛𐬄𐬨	दम dama	дом dom		*domo-, *domu- "house"
բերել berel "to bring"	bear ( ← OE beran "give birth, carry")	ferre "to carry"	φέρω phérō	بردن، برـ bordan, bar- "to carry"	भरति bharati "to carry"	брать brat' "to take"	beirid "carry"	*bʱer- "to carry"

== Sample text ==
Below is a sample text of Article 1 of the Universal Declaration of Human Rights in Armenian:

Eastern Armenian	Romanization	Pronunciation
Բոլոր մարդիկ ծնվում են ազատ ու հավասար` իրենց արժանապատվությամբ և իրավունքներով: Նրանք օժտված են բանականությամբ ու խղճով, և պարտավոր են միմյանց նկատմամբ վարվել եղբայրության ոգով:	Bolor mardik tznvum en azat u havasar irents arzhanapatvuthyamb yev iravunqnerov. Nranq ozhtvatz en banakanuthyamb u xghcov, yev partavor en mimyants nkatmamb varvel yeghbayruthyan vogov.	[bɔˈlɔɾ mɑɾˈdik t͡sənˈvum ɛn ɑˈzɑt u hɑvɑˈsɑɾ iˈɾɛnt͡sʰ ɑɾʒɑnɑpɑtvuˈtʰjɑmb jɛv iɾɑvuŋkʰnɛˈɾɔv ‖ nəˈɾɑŋkʰ ɔʒtˈvɑt͡s ɛn bɑnɑkɑnuˈtʰjɑmb u χəʁˈt͡ʃɔv jɛv pɑɾtɑˈvɔɾ ɛn miˈmjɑnt͡sʰ nəkɑtˈmɑmb vɑɾˈvɛl jɛʁbɑjɾuˈtʰjɑn vɔˈɡɔv ‖]
Western Armenian	Romanization	Pronunciation
Բոլոր մարդիկ կը ծնուին ազատ եւ հաւասար իրենց արժանապատուութեամբ եւ իրաւունքներով: Իրենք օժտուած են բանականութեամբ ու խիղճով, եւ պարտաւորուած են միմեանց հանդէպ եղբայրութեան ոգիով վարուիլ:	Polor martig gė dznvin azad yev havasar irents arzhanabadvuthyamp yev iravunqnerov. Irenq ozhtvadz yen panaganuthyamp u xighjov, yev bardavorvadz yen mimyants hantèb yeghpayruthyan voqiov varvil.	[pɔˈlɔɾ mɑɾˈtig gə d͡zənˈvin ɑˈzɑd jɛv hɑvɑˈsɑɾ iˈɾɛnt͡sʰ ɑɾʒɑnɑbɑdvuˈtʰjɑmp jɛv iɾɑvuŋkʰnɛˈɾɔv ‖ iˈɾɛŋkʰ ɔʒtˈvɑd͡z jɛn pɑnɑgɑnuˈtʰjɑmp u χiʁˈd͡ʒɔv jɛv bɑɾdɑvɔɾˈvɑd͡z jɛn miˈmjɑnt͡sʰ hɑnˈtɛb jɛχpɑjɾuˈtʰjɑn vɔkʰiˈɔv vɑɾˈvil ‖]

English translation
All human beings are born free and equal in dignity and rights. They are endowed with reason and conscience and should act towards one another in a spirit of brotherhood.

== See also ==
- Armenian PowerSpell, electronic text corrector
- Armenian Sign Language
- Auguste Carrière
- Classical Armenian orthography
- European Charter for Regional or Minority Languages
- Languages of Armenia
- Language families and languages
- List of Indo-European languages

== Bibliography ==
- Dolatian, Hossep (2024). Adjarian's Armenian dialectology (1911): Translation and commentary (PDF). Berlin: Language Science Press. ISBN 978-3-96110-489-5.
- Dum-Tragut, Jasmine (2009). Armenian: Modern Eastern Armenian. London Oriental and African language library. Amsterdam: John Benjamins Publishing Company. ISBN 978-90-272-8879-0. OCLC 593240232.
- Fortson, Benjamin W. (2004). Indo-European Language and Culture: An Introduction. Blackwell textbooks in linguistics (1st ed.). Malden: Blackwell Publishing. ISBN 978-1-4051-0316-9. OCLC 863202575.
- Hübschmann, Heinrich (1875), "Über die Stellung des armenischen im Kreise der indogermanischen Sprachen", Zeitschrift für Vergleichende Sprachforschung, 23: 5–42, archived from the original on 2005-12-21
- Livshits, Vladimir (2006). "Armeno-Partho-Sogdica". Iran and the Caucasus. 10 (1): 77–86. doi:10.1163/157338406777979412. ISSN 1609-8498.
- Price, Glanville (2005) [1998]. Encyclopedia of the languages of Europe (1st ed.). Oxford: Blackwell. ISBN 978-0-631-19286-2.
- "Treaty on Eurasian Economic Union" (PDF). eaeunion.org. Eurasian Economic Union. Archived from the original (PDF) on 6 February 2021. "Article 110 Working Language of the Bodies of the Union. Language of International Treaties within the Union and Decisions of the Commission: 2. International treaties within the Union and decisions of the Commission that are binding on the Member States shall be adopted in Russian with subsequent translation into the official languages of the Member States, if it is provided for by their legislation, in the procedure determined by the Commission."
- Եվրասիական տնտեսական միություն. eaeunion.org (in Armenian). Eurasian Economic Union.
- Եվրասիական Տնտեսական Հանձնաժողով. eurasiancommission.org (in Armenian). Eurasian Economic Commission.
- "Western Armenian – Cypriot Arabic: new century, new speakers?". ec.europa.eu. European Commission. 21 February 2017. "Dedicated to the two officially recognized minority languages of Cyprus, the event will focus on the teaching aspect of Western Armenian and Cypriot Arabic as mother tongues."
- Hadjilyra, Alexander – Michael (2016). "The Armenians of Cyprus" (PDF). publications.gov.cy. Press and Information Office, Republic of Cyprus. p. 15. Archived from the original (PDF) on 14 December 2019. "According to the European Charter for Regional or Minority Languages of the Council of Europe, Armenian was recognised as a minority language of Cyprus as of 1 December 2002."
- Kenesei, István (2009). "Minority languages in Bulgaria" (PDF). efnil.org. European Federation of National Institutions for Language. Archived from the original (PDF) on 14 December 2019. "As far as indigenous (autochthonous) minority languages are concerned, Hungarian legislation acknowledges the languages in the following list ...: Armenian, Boyash, Bulgarian, Croatian, German, Greek, Polish, Romani, Romanian, Ruthenian, Serbian, Slovak, Slovene, Ukrainian, and Hungarian Sign Language (HSL)."
- "Iraqi Constitution: Article 4" (PDF). The Republic of Iraq Ministry of Interior General Directorate for Nationality. Archived from the original (PDF) on 28 November 2016. "The right of Iraqis to educate their children in their mother tongue, such as Turkmen, Syriac, and Armenian shall be guaranteed in government educational institutions in accordance with educational guidelines, or in any other language in private educational institutions."
- Zych, Maciej. "New Polish legislation regarding national, ethnic and linguistic minorities" (PDF). gugik.gov.pl. Head Office of Geodesy and Cartography of Poland. p. 2. Archived from the original (PDF) on 14 December 2019. "There are 9 national minorities: Belorussian, Czech, Lithuanian, German, Armenian, Russian, Slovak, Ukrainian and Jewish; and 4 ethnic minorities – Karait, Lemko, Roma and Tartar."
- Pisarek, Walery (2009). "The relationship between official and minority languages in Poland" (PDF). efnil.org. European Federation of National Institutions for Language. p. 118. Archived from the original (PDF) on 14 December 2019. "In a Statement made by the Republic of Poland with relation to the ratification of the European Charter for Regional or Minority Languages, Belarusian, Czech, Hebrew, Yiddish, Karaim, Kashubian, Lithuanian, Lemkian, German, Armenian, Romani, Russian, Slovak, Tatar and Ukrainian were recognized as minority languages."
- Saramandu, Nicolae; Nevaci, Manuela (2009). "MULTILINGVISM ȘI LIMBI MINORITARE ÎN ROMÂNIA [MULTILINGUALISM AND MINORITY LANGUAGES IN ROMANIA]" (PDF) (in Romanian). Institute of Linguistics "Iorgu Iordan – Alexandru Rosetti", Romanian Academy. p. 25. Archived from the original (PDF) on 2019-12-14. "În cazul României, 10 limbi beneficiază de protecție generală (albaneză, armeană, greacă, italiană, idiș, macedoneană, poloneză, romani, ruteană, tătară) și 10 limbi beneficiază de protecție sporită (bulgară, cehă, croată, germană, maghiară, rusă, sârbă, slovacă, turcă, ucraineană)."
- Toktaş, Şule (2006). "EU enlargement conditions and minority protection : a reflection on Turkey's non-Muslim minorities". East European Quarterly. 40 (4): 489–519. ISSN 0012-8449. p. 514: "This implies that Turkey grants educational right in minority languages only to the recognized minorities covered by the Lausanne who are the Armenians, Greeks and the Jews."
- Bayır, Derya (2013). Minorities and nationalism in Turkish law. Cultural Diversity and Law. Farnham: Ashgate Publishing. pp. 89–90. ISBN 978-1-4094-7254-4. "Oran farther points out that the rights set out for the four categories are stated to be the 'fundamental law' of the land, so that no legislation or official action shall conflict or interfere with these stipulations or prevail over them (article 37). [...] According to the Turkish state, only Greek, Armenian and Jewish non-Muslims were granted minority protection by the Lausanne Treaty. [...] Except for non-Muslim populations - that is, Greeks, Jews and Armenians - none of the other minority groups' language rights have been de jure protected by the legal system in Turkey."
- Questions and Answers: Freedom of Expression and Language Rights in Turkey. New York: Human Rights Watch. April 2002. "The Turkish government accepts the language rights of the Jewish, Greek and Armenian minorities as being guaranteed by the 1923 Treaty of Lausanne."
- Uzum, Melike; Demir, Nurettin (2017-10-24). "Minority Language Education and Policy in Turkey: The Case of Cankiri Poshas". Journal of Universality of Global Education Issues. 4: 5–6. ISSN 2575-9388. "In the Lausanne treaty, people of the republic were defined through a religion based definition, similar to the Ottoman concept of millet (nation). For example, the non-Muslim minorities such as Armenians, Greeks, and Jews were recognized as minorities, and their language rights were identified in articles 39, 40, and 41."
- "H. Acharian Institute of Language". sci.am. Archived from the original on 5 October 2014. "Main Fields of Activity: investigation of the structure and functioning, history and comparative grammar of the Armenian language, exploration of the literary Eastern and Western Armenian Language, dialectology, regulation of literary language, development of terminology"
- "Activity". langcom.am. Language Committee (The Ministry of Education, Science, Culture and Sports of the Republic of Armenia).
- Borjian, Maryam (2017). Language and Globalization: An Autoethnographic Approach. Routledge. p. 205. ISBN 9781315394619. "At the forefront of the development of Western Armenian in everyday life as well as in arts and technology is the Calouste Gulbenkian Foundation."
- Yesayan, Catherine (June 19, 2019). "Unraveling the Life of Calouste Gulbenkian". Asbarez. Archived from the original on 2 May 2021. "The 'core' activity of the Armenian Department is the preservation, advancement and revitalization of Western Armenian."
- Eberhard, David M.; Simons, Gary F.; Fennig, Charles D., eds. (2023). Ethnologue: Languages of the World (26th ed.). Dallas: SIL International.
- Martirosyan, Hrach (March 2, 2020). "All You Need to Know about Armenian Language". ASPIRANTUM: Armenian School of Languages and Cultures. Archived from the original on 2 May 2021. "The total number of Armenians in the world is roughly estimated as 7–11 million, of which ca. 5-5.5 million speak Armenian."
- "Language Monday: Armenian". World Book Encyclopedia. April 23, 2018. Archived from the original on 2 May 2021. "About 7 million people speak the Armenian language worldwide."
- "Armenian language". Encyclopedia Britannica. 21 November 2023.
- Mateescu, Alexandru; Salomaa, Arto (1997). "Formal Languages: an Introduction and a Synopsis". In Rozenberg, Grzegorz; Salomaa, Arto (eds.). Handbook of Formal Languages. Vol. 1. Springer. p. 6. ISBN 3-540-60420-0.
- "Indo-European tree with Armeno-Aryan, exclusion of Greek". Archived from the original on 2018-05-14.
- Holm, Hans J. (2011). "'Swadesh lists' of Albanian Revisited and Consequences for its position in the Indo-European Languages". The Journal of Indo-European Studies. 39 (1–2).
- Martirosyan, Hrach (2013). "The place of Armenian in the Indo-European language family: the relationship with Greek and Indo-Iranian". Journal of Language Relationship. 10 (1): 85–138. doi:10.31826/jlr-2013-100107. S2CID 212688448.
- Clackson, James P. T. (2008). "Classical Armenian". In Woodard, Roger D. (ed.). The Ancient Languages of Asia Minor. Cambridge University Press. p. 124. doi:10.1017/CBO9780511486845.014. ISBN 9780521684965.
- Greppin, John A. C.; Diakonoff, Igor M. (1991). "Some Effects of the Hurro-Urartian People and Their Languages upon the Earliest Armenians". Journal of the American Oriental Society. 111 (4): 720–730. doi:10.2307/603403. JSTOR 603403.
- Anthony, David W. (2007). The Horse, the Wheel, and Language: How Bronze-Age Riders from the Eurasian Steppes Shaped the Modern World. Princeton University Press. pp. 56–58. ISBN 978-0-691-05887-0.
- Yediay, Fulya Eylem; Kroonen, Guus; Allentoft, Morten Erik; Kristiansen, Kristian; Willerslev, Eske; et al. (2 December 2024). "Ancient genomics support deep divergence between Eastern and Western Mediterranean Indo-European languages". bioRxiv 10.1101/2024.12.02.626332.
- Lazaridis, Iosif; Alpaslan-Roodenberg, Songül; et al. (26 August 2022). "The genetic history of the Southern Arc: A bridge between West Asia and Europe". Science. 377 (6609) eabm4247. Bibcode:2022Sci...377m4247L. doi:10.1126/science.abm4247. PMC 10064553. PMID 36007055. S2CID 251962193.
- Petrosyan, Armen; Palyan, Aram (2025). "The Problem of the Origin of Armenians in Light of Recent Archaeogenetic Data". Indo-European Linguistics and Classical Philology. XXIX (2): 201. doi:10.30842/ielcp2306901529084.
- Kim, Ronald (2018). "Greco-Armenian: The persistence of a myth". Indogermanische Forschungen. 123 (1). The University of British Columbia Library. doi:10.1515/if-2018-0009. S2CID 231923312.
- Meyer, Robin (2017). Iranian-Armenian Language Contact in and before the 5th Century CE (D.Phil. thesis). University of Oxford.
- Meyer, Robin (2023). Iranian Syntax in Classical Armenian: The Armenian Perfect and Other Cases of Pattern Replication. Oxford University Press. ISBN 9780191885839.
- Vaux, B. (2010). "Armenian". In Brown, Keith; Ogilvie, Sarah (eds.). Concise Encyclopedia of Languages of the World. Elsevier. p. 70. ISBN 978-0-08-087774-7. "The relationship between the two modern literary dialects is somewhat complicated; there are many grammatical differences [...] and lexical differences [...], and most Western speakers have difficulty understanding Eastern, but many Eastern speakers are relatively comfortable with the Western dialect. [...] The fact that there is some mutual intelligibility in both directions can also be linked to the fact that the literary dialects tend to borrow the same forms from Classical Armenian, and (at least in recent decades) employ the same newly coined words."
- Dolatian, Hossep; Sharifzadeh, Afsheen; Vaux, Bert (2023-05-22). "Introduction". A grammar of Iranian Armenian (PDF). Language Science Press. p. 2. ISBN 978-3-96110-419-2. Archived from the original (PDF) on 2023-10-14. "There are two standardized dialects that are mutually intelligible after significant exposure: Standard Western Armenian (SWA) and Standard Eastern Armenian (SEA); henceforth Standard Western and Standard Eastern."
- Comrie, Bernard (2020). "Languages of the World". In Aronoff, Mark; Rees-Miller, Janie (eds.). The Handbook of Linguistics. Blackwell Handbooks in Linguistics (2nd ed.). Hoboken, NJ Chichester: Wiley-Blackwell. p. 23. ISBN 978-1-119-30207-0. "Armenian, spoken primarily in Armenia though also in the Armenian diaspora originating in eastern Turkey, is another branch of Indo-European consisting of a single language, although the differences between Eastern Armenian (spoken mainly in Armenia) and Western Armenian (spoken originally mainly in Turkey) are considerable, and there are two written languages."
- Vaux, Bert (2007-01-24). "Homshetsma, The language of the Armenians of Hamshen". In Simonian, Hovann (ed.). The Hemshin: History, Society and Identity in the Highlands of Northeast Turkey. Routledge. ISBN 978-1-135-79830-7. "Homshetsma is generally treated as a dialect of western Armenian. The two are generally not mutually intelligible"
- Kurkjian, Vahan (2008). "Armenia as Xenophon Saw It". A History of Armenia. p. 47.
- Movsisyan, Artak (2006). The Writing Culture of Pre-Christian Armenia. Yerevan University. ISBN 5-8084-0810-5.
- Kossian, Aram V. (1997). "The Mushki Problem Reconsidered". SMEA. 39 (2): 262.
- Austin, William M. (January–March 1942). "Is Armenian an Anatolian Language?". Language. 18 (1). Linguistic Society of America: 22–25. doi:10.2307/409074. JSTOR 409074.
- Martirosyan, Hrach (2015), "Notes on Anatolian loanwords in Armenian" (PDF), St. Petersburg, Institute for linguistic studies, Russian Academy of sciences, Russia, archived (PDF) from the original on 2022-10-09
- Diakonoff, I. M. (1985). "Hurro-Urartian Borrowings in Old Armenian". Journal of the American Oriental Society. 105 (4). New Haven: 597–603. doi:10.2307/602722. ISSN 0003-0279. JSTOR 602722. OCLC 6015257905. S2CID 163807245.
- Martirosyan, Hrach K. (2009). Etymological Dictionary of the Armenian Inherited Lexicon. Brill.
- Petrosyan, Armen (2010). "The Armenian Elements in the Language and Onomastics of Urartu". Aramazd: Armenian Journal of Near Eastern Studies. V (1). Yerevan: Association for Near Eastern and Caucasian Studies, German University of Armenia: 134.
- Vaux, Bert (1998). "Recent Armenological Research of Indo-European Relevance".
- Martirosyan, Hrach (2014). Origins and historical development of the Armenian language (PDF). Лингвистическая школа НИУ ВШЭ. Moscow. pp. 7–8.
- Petrosyan, Armen (2007). "Towards the Origins of the Armenian People. The Problem of Identification of the Proto-Armenians: A Critical Review". Journal of the Society for Armenian Studies. 16: 33–34.
- Grekyan, Yervand (2018). "Urartian State Mythology". In Grekyan, Y; Badalyan, M.; Tiratsyan, N.; Petrosyan, A (eds.). Biainili-Urartu: Gods, Temples, Cults (in Armenian). Yerevan: Yerevan Institute of Archaeology and Ethnography Press. pp. 44–45. ISBN 978-9939-9178-0-1.
- Simon, Szolt (2022). "The Hurro-Urartian loan contacts of Armenian: A revision" (PDF). Hungarian Assyriological Review. 3: 63–89. doi:10.52093/hara-202201-00029-000.
- Bjørn, Rasmus G. (2026). "Words across Eurasia: Wanderwörter as a heuristic device to calibrate language and archaeology". In Kilani, Marwan; Bjørn, Rasmus G. (eds.). Beyond Recorded History. Studies in Language Change. Vol. 25. Berlin: Walter de Gruyter GmbH. pp. 111–112. doi:10.1515/9783111574547. ISBN 978-3-11-157357-1. "The first impulse is the direct descendants of Proto-Indo-European *h1eḱwos as they moved with Armenian and Iranic across the Caucasus and into Central Asia, respectively. The spread across the Caucasus into Southwest triggered the well-established Wanderwort across the early literary languages from Hurrian through Sumerian and Egyptian. ... Since all other branches in which it is preserved also retain the meaning horse, Armenian eš 'donkey' is most parsimoniously explained as a singular semantic shift. It may thus be corroborated, within the very concrete framework of the spread of Indic and Armenian to the Hurrian speaking area in the early second and late third millennium BC, respectively, that the Armenian 'horse' was broadened to mean 'equid' as a more superior horse was introduced with the Mitanni Indic speakers."
- "ARMENIA AND IRAN iv. Iranian influences in Armenian Language". Encyclopaedia Iranica.
- Hübschmann, Heinrich (1967). "On the Position of Armenian in the Sphere of the Indo-European Languages". In Lehmann, Winfred P. (ed.). A Reader in Nineteenth Century Historical Indo-European Linguistics. Indiana University Press. Archived from the original on 2022-08-20.
- Renfrew, Colin (1987). Archaeology and Language: The Puzzle of Indo-European Origins. London: Pimlico. ISBN 0-7126-6612-5.
- Gamkrelidze, Thomas V.; Ivanov, V. V. (March 1990). "The Early History of Indo-European Languages". Scientific American. 262 (3): 110–117. Bibcode:1990SciAm.262c.110G. doi:10.1038/scientificamerican0390-110. JSTOR 24996796.
- Renfrew, Colin (2003). "Time Depth, Convergence Theory, and Innovation in Proto-Indo-European". Languages in Prehistoric Europe. Winter. ISBN 3-8253-1449-9.
- Gray, Russell D.; Atkinson, Quentin D. (2003). "Language-tree divergence times support the Anatolian theory of Indo-European origin" (PDF). Nature. 426 (6965): 435–439. Bibcode:2003Natur.426..435G. doi:10.1038/nature02029. PMID 14647380. S2CID 42340. Archived from the original (PDF) on 20 May 2011.
- Mallory, James P. (1997). "Kuro-Araxes Culture". In Mallory, James P.; Adams, Douglas Q. (eds.). Encyclopedia of Indo-European Culture. Fitzroy Dearborn. pp. 341–42. ISBN 1-884964-98-2.
- Bammesberger, Alfred (1992). "The Place of Europe in Germanic and Indo-European". The Cambridge History of the English language. Cambridge: Cambridge University Press. p. 32. doi:10.1017/CHOL9780521264747.003. ISBN 978-0-521-26474-7.
- Euler, Wolfram (1979). Indoiranisch-griechische Gemeinsamkeiten der Nominalbildung und deren indogermanische Grundlagen. Innsbruck.
- Pisowicz, Andrzej (1995). "How Did New Persian and Arabic Words Penetrate the Middle Armenian Vocabulary? Remarks on the Material of Kostandin Erznkac'i's Poetry". In Weitenberg, Joseph Johannes Sicco (ed.). New Approaches to Medieval Armenian Language and Literature. Dutch Studies in Armenian Language and Literature. Vol. 3. p. 96. doi:10.1163/9789004455139_008. ISBN 9789004455139.
- Schütz, E. (1964). "Tangsux in Armenia". Acta Orientalia Academiae Scientiarum Hungaricae. 17 (1). Akadémiai Kiadó: 106. JSTOR 23656665.
- Panossian, Razmik (2006). The Armenians: From Kings and Priests to Merchants and Commissars. New York: Columbia University Press. p. 39. ISBN 9780231139267.
- Ouzounian, Nourhan (2000). Hacikyan, Agop Jack; Basmajian, Gabriel; Franchuk, Edward S.; et al. (eds.). The heritage of Armenian literature. Detroit: Wayne State Univ. Press. p. 88. ISBN 0814328156.
- Mirzoyan, H. (2005). Նարեկացու բառաշխարհը [Narekatsi's World of Words]. Banber Erewani Hamalsarani (in Armenian). 1 (115): 85–114.
- Švejcer, Aleksandr D. (1986). Contemporary Sociolinguistics: Theory, Problems, Methods. Amsterdam/Philadelphia: John Benjamins Publishing Company. p. 70. ISBN 9027215189.
- Khachaturian, Lisa (2009). Cultivating nationhood in imperial Russia the periodical press and the formation of a modern Armenian identity. New Brunswick, N.J.: Transaction Publishers. p. 1. ISBN 978-1412813723.
- Beledian, Krikor (2014). Berghaus, Günter (ed.). International Yearbook of Futurism. Walter de Gruyter GmbH & Co KG. p. 264. ISBN 978-3110334104.
- Waters, Bella (2009). Armenia in pictures. Minneapolis: VGS/Twenty-First Century Books. p. 48. ISBN 978-0822585763.
- Cobarrubias, Juan; Fishman, Joshua A. (1983). Progress in language planning: International Perspectives. Berlin: Mouton Publishers. pp. 315, 319. ISBN 902793388X.
- Meillet, Antoine (1900), Meillet (1900)
- Kortlandt, Frederik (1989), Kortlandt (1989)
- Martirosyan, Hrach (January 2019), "The Armenian dialects: Archaisms and innovations; description of individual dialects", Bulletin of Armenian Studies / Армянский гуманитарный вестник (Moscow / Yerevan) vol. 5 [Proceedings of the IX International Conference on Armenian Linguistics. Institute for Linguistic Studies, Russian Academy of Sciences, St. Petersburg 7-9 November 2012]: 164-258, p. 138
- Hille, Charlotte (2010). State Building and Conflict Resolution in the Caucasus. Leiden, Netherlands: Brill Publishers. p. 241. ISBN 9789004179011.
- Karamanian, Armen Samuel (2019-11-13). "'He Wasn't Able to Understand What I Was Saying': The Experiences of Returnees' Speaking Western Armenian in 'Eastern' Armenia". PORTAL Journal of Multidisciplinary International Studies. 16 (1–2): 120–140. doi:10.5130/pjmis.v16i1-2.6290. hdl:10453/141096. ISSN 1449-2490. S2CID 211676057.
- "Javakhk Armenians Looks Ahead to Local Elections". Asbarez. 31 March 2010. "Javakheti for use in the region's 144 Armenian schools ..."
- Mezhdoyan, Slava (28 November 2012). "Challenges and problems of the Armenian community of Georgia" (PDF). Tbilisi: European Armenian Federation for Justice and Democracy. Archived (PDF) from the original on 2022-10-09. "Armenian schools in Georgia are fully funded by the government ..."
- "Consideration of Reports Submitted by States Parties Under Article 44 of the Convention. Third periodic reports of states parties due in 2003: Lebanon" (PDF). Committee on the Rights of the Child. 25 October 2005. p. 108. Archived (PDF) from the original on 2022-10-09. "Right of minorities to learn their language. The Lebanese curriculum allows Armenian schools to teach the Armenian language as a basic language."
- Sanjian, Ara. "Armenians and the 2000 Parliamentary Elections in Lebanon". Armenian News Network / Groong. University of Southern California. Archived from the original on 26 May 2014. "Moreover, the Lebanese government approved a plan whereby the Armenian language was to be considered from now on as one of the few 'second foreign languages' that students can take as part of the official Lebanese secondary school certificate (Baccalaureate) exams."
- "Armenian Translations". California Department of Social Services. Archived from the original on 26 May 2014.
- Վարորդների ձեռնարկ [Driver's Manual] (PDF). California Department of Motor Vehicles. 2016. Archived from the original (PDF) on January 12, 2018.
- "English/Armenian Legal Glossary" (PDF). Superior Court of California, County of Sacramento. 22 June 2005. Archived (PDF) from the original on 2022-10-09.
- Rocha, Veronica (11 January 2011). "New Glendale traffic safety warnings in English, Armenian, Spanish". Los Angeles Times.
- Aghajanian, Liana (4 September 2012). "Intersections: Bad driving signals a need for reflection". Glendale News-Press. Archived from the original on 25 May 2017. "... trilingual street signs in English, Armenian, and Spanish at intersections ..."
- Rerooted Archive (2020-05-31). How Syrian-Armenians Preserved Western Armenian – via YouTube.
- "Armenians, Kurds in Lebanon hold on to their languages". AW. 2016.
- Yesiltas, Ozum (2016-07-02). "Contested Notions of National Identity, Ethnic Movements And Democratization in Iran". Studies of Transition States and Societies. 8 (1): 53–68. doi:10.58036/stss.v8i1.255. ISSN 1736-8758.
- Riazi, Abdolmehdi (2005-07-04), "6. The Four Language Stages in the History of Iran", Decolonisation, Globalisation, Multilingual Matters, pp. 98–114, doi:10.21832/9781853598265-008, ISBN 978-1-85359-826-5
- "Legal Aspects of Education in Mother Language for Iranian Azerbaijani Students". eLIBRARY.RU. 2017. pp. 284–294.
- Clackson, James (2007). Indo-European Linguistics: An Introduction. Cambridge University Press. doi:10.1017/CBO9780511808616. ISBN 9780521653671.
- Beekes, Robert S.P. (1995). Comparative Indo-European Linguistics: An Introduction. John Benjamins. doi:10.1075/z.72. ISBN 9781556195051.
- Szemerényi, Oswald J.L. (1999). Introduction to Indo-European Linguistics. Oxford University Press. ISBN 9780198238706.
- Kortmann, Bernd; van der Auwera, Johan (2011). The Languages and Linguistics of Europe: A Comprehensive Guide. Walter de Gruyter. p. 129. ISBN 978-3110220261.
- The New Armenia, Vol. 11-12. New Armenia Publishing Company. 1919. p. 160. ISBN 1248372786.
- Friedman, Victor A. (2009). "Sociolinguistics in the Caucasus". In Ball, Martin J. (ed.). The Routledge Handbook of Sociolinguistics Around the World: A Handbook. Routledge. p. 128. ISBN 978-0415422789.
- Baghdassarian-Thapaltsian, S. H. (1970). Շիրակի դաշտավայրի բարբառային նկարագիրը. Լրաբեր Հասարակական Գիտությունների (Bulletin of Social Sciences) (in Armenian). 6 (6): 51–60. Archived from the original on 15 September 2019.
- Hovannisian, Richard, ed. (2003). Armenian Karin/Erzerum. Costa Mesa, California: Mazda Publ. p. 48. ISBN 9781568591513. "Thus, even today the Erzerum dialect is widely spoken in the northernmost districts of the Armenian republic as well as in the Akhalkalak (Javakheti; Javakhk) and Akhaltskha (Akhaltsikh) districts of southern Georgia"
- Tekushev, Islam (5 January 2016). "An unlikely home". openDemocracy. Archived from the original on 20 September 2016.
- "Online Etymology Dictionary". etymonline.com. Archived from the original on 13 June 2007.
- "Article 1 of the UDHR". omniglot.com.
