= Zoks =

Ethnographic group of Armenians

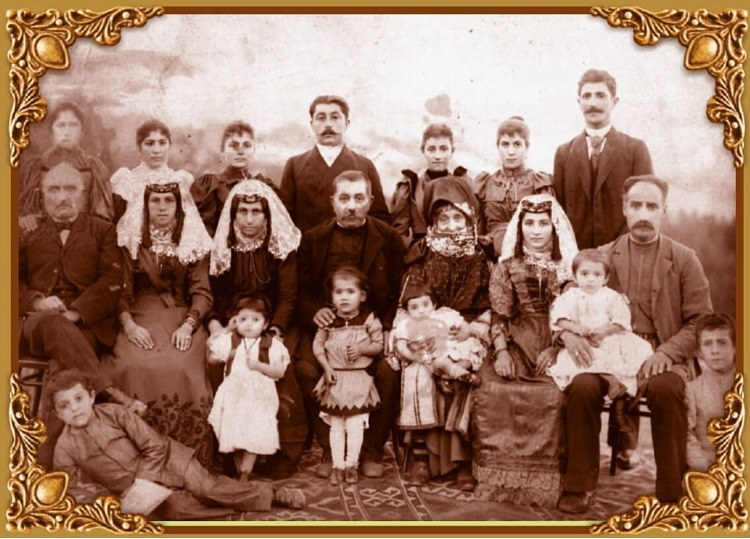

Zoks (Armenian: Զոկեր), are an ethnographic group of Armenians. They were the indigenous population of the Goghtn province, including Agulis a large late medieval Armenian region and several surrounding villages. The name "Zok" comes from the use of a preposition in conversation in the local dialect of the Armenian language. The Zok dialect is one of the dialects of the Armenian language.

== The historical fate of the Zoks ==
The Armenian population of Agulis the primary settlement center of the Zoks was largely decimated or expelled in 1919 during the inter-ethnic conflicts in Transcaucasia that erupted following the collapse of the Russian Empire. After the formation of the USSR, these territories were incorporated into the Azerbaijan SSR. During the Soviet period, the Armenian population persisted only in a few small settlements around Agulis; however, they were eventually forced to evacuate during the Nagorno-Karabakh conflict in the late 1980s. Currently, the Zoks have almost entirely integrated into the broader Armenian nation. Notably, at the beginning of the 20th century, a newspaper titled "The Zok’s Lamp" (Lampada Zok) was published in Tbilisi.

== Zok language ==
Zoks are Armenians who migrated from the Syunik region to the Goghtn region. They spoke the Zok or Agulis dialect of Armenian, which closely resembles the Syunik dialect. Although it is linguistically close to the Eastern Armenian dialect, it is somewhat unintelligible to speakers of the latter. This difference has led to many myths regarding the origin of the Zoks.

In the Armenian language, there are several demonstrative pronouns such as "ays", "ayd", and "ayn" (meaning "this" and "that"). In the old Goghtn dialect, these were pronounced as "hok", "dok", and "nock". In the Agulis dialect spoken in the villages of Agulis, Dasht, Tsgna, Tanakert, Disar, Kakhakik, and Andamech, these pronouns were used with the prefix "z" a feature typical of 18th- and 19th-century Armenian dialects. This gave rise to the pronoun "zhok" or "Zok", which eventually led to the creation of the ethnographic and linguistic term "Zok" in the 19th century. According to linguist and academician Manuk Abeghyan, the name "Zok" derives from the pronoun "zhok" in their dialect.

In essence, the Zoks represent one of the indigenous Armenian communities of Nakhichevan. The uniqueness of their language is primarily due to vowel shifts. For example, the vowel "o" changed to "u" (e.g., gorts → gyurts, Markos → Marcus), and "u" changed to "o" (e.g., shun → shon, ptug → petog). The vowel "a". depending on surrounding consonants, could shift to "o", "u", "y", "i", "ai", or remain unchanged.

The consonant system of the Zok dialect has remained unchanged since the Classical Armenian (Grabar) period and, in fact, best reflects the consonant structure of Old Armenian. Moreover, the dialect preserves features of Proto-Armenian that are absent in Grabar. For example, the word kakhts' (from Proto-Indo-European "glkt-") retains the presence of the consonant "l", while in other forms of Armenian, such as Old Armenian, it appears as kat'.

The Zok (Agulis dialect) was first described in 1711 by the German linguist Johann Joachim Schröder in his grammatical work Thesaurus Linguae Armenicae.

== See also ==
- Agulis (historical)
- Zok language
- Armenians
