= Zok language =

Armenian variety considered a separate language

Zok
- Agulis–Meghri
- Native to: originally SE Nakhichevan
- Ethnicity: Zoks
- Native speakers: (few)
- Language family: Indo-European: Armenian; Eastern; Zok
- Dialects: Agulis; Meghri

Language codes
- ISO 639-3: –
- Glottolog: agul1245
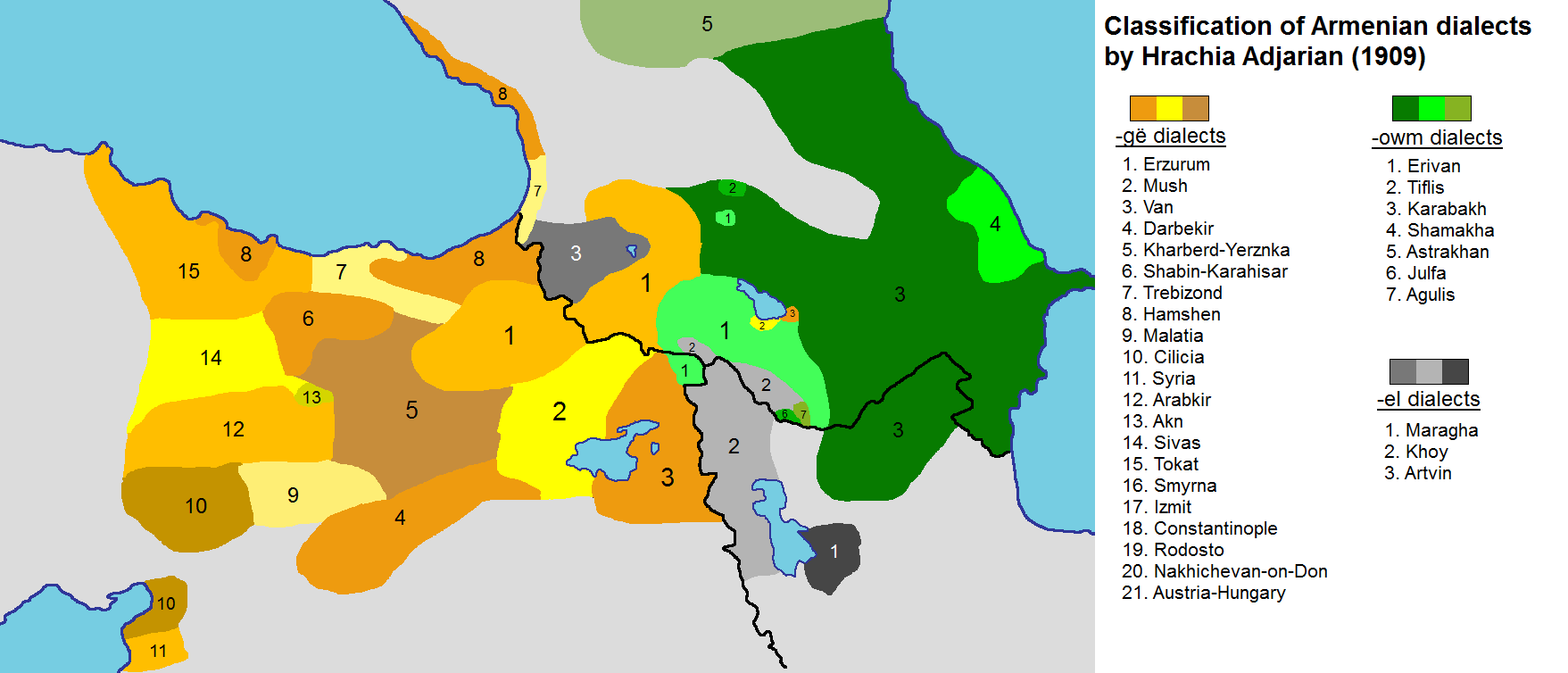
- Zok

Zok language (Armenian: Զոկերեն), also known as Agulis–Meghri, is a variety of Eastern Armenian. It is commonly considered a dialect, but is unintelligible to speakers of Standard Eastern Armenian. Its speakers refer to it as zokerēn or the "Zok language" or "Agulis dialect". Zok is significantly different from other Armenian varieties, leading to myths about its origins. However, in reality, the Zoks are an indigenous Armenian community from the Nakhichevan region.

== History ==
Originally spoken in Nakhchivan, which is now part of Azerbaijan, the last Armenians of Nakhchivan were forced to leave due to conflict in 1988. In 1935, Zok had approximately 10,000 speakers according to Acharyan, but it is now certain that the number of speakers is much smaller, likely less than 1,000. The Paraka dialect is estimated to have fewer than 50 living speakers based on the Armenian National Archive's data of a population of 90 residents in the village at the time of the last Armenian displacement in 1988. Zok's vowel system is the most distinguishable feature that sets it apart from other Armenian dialects, with significant changes and the addition of a unique form of vowel harmony, according to Vaux (2008).

Additionally, Zok has notable morphological and syntactic innovations, particularly in the organization of its tense-aspect-mood system, which is unparalleled in other Armenian dialects.

== The origin of the Zok language ==
Zoks are Armenians who migrated from the Syunik region to the Goghtn region. They spoke the Zok or Agulis dialect of Armenian, which closely resembles the Syunik dialect. Although it is linguistically close to the Eastern Armenian dialect, it is somewhat unintelligible to speakers of the latter.

In the Armenian language, there are several demonstrative pronouns such as "ays", "ayd", and "ayn" (meaning "this" and "that"). In the old Goghtn dialect, these were pronounced as "hok", "dok", and "nock". In the Agulis dialect spoken in the villages of Agulis, Dasht, Tsgna, Tanakert, Disar, Kakhakik, and Andamech, these pronouns were used with the prefix "z"—a feature typical of 18th- and 19th-century Armenian dialects. This gave rise to the pronoun "zhok" or "Zok", which eventually led to the creation of the ethnographic and linguistic term "Zok" in the 19th century. According to linguist and academician Manuk Abeghyan, the name "Zok" derives from the pronoun "zhok" in their dialect.

In essence, the Zoks represent one of the indigenous Armenian communities of Nakhichevan. The uniqueness of their language is primarily due to vowel shifts. For example, the vowel "o" changed to "u" (e.g., gorts → gyurts, Markos → Marcus), and "u" changed to "o" (e.g., shun → shon, ptug → petog). The vowel "a". depending on surrounding consonants, could shift to "o", "u", "y", "i", "ai", or remain unchanged.

The consonant system of the Zok dialect has remained unchanged since the Classical Armenian (Grabar) period and, in fact, best reflects the consonant structure of Old Armenian. Moreover, the dialect preserves features of Proto-Armenian that are absent in Grabar. For example, the word kakhts' (from Proto-Indo-European "glkt-") retains the presence of the consonant "l", while in other forms of Armenian, such as Old Armenian, it appears as kat'.

The Zok (Agulis dialect) was first described in 1711 by the German linguist Johann Joachim Schröder in his grammatical work Thesaurus Linguae Armenicae.

== See also ==
- Agulis (historical)
- Zoks
- Languages of the Caucasus
- Armenian dialects
- Armenian language
- Eastern Armenian
- Dialect
