= David of Sassoun =

Protagonist of Armenian epic Daredevils of Sassoun

David Դավիթ
- Daredevils of Sassoun character
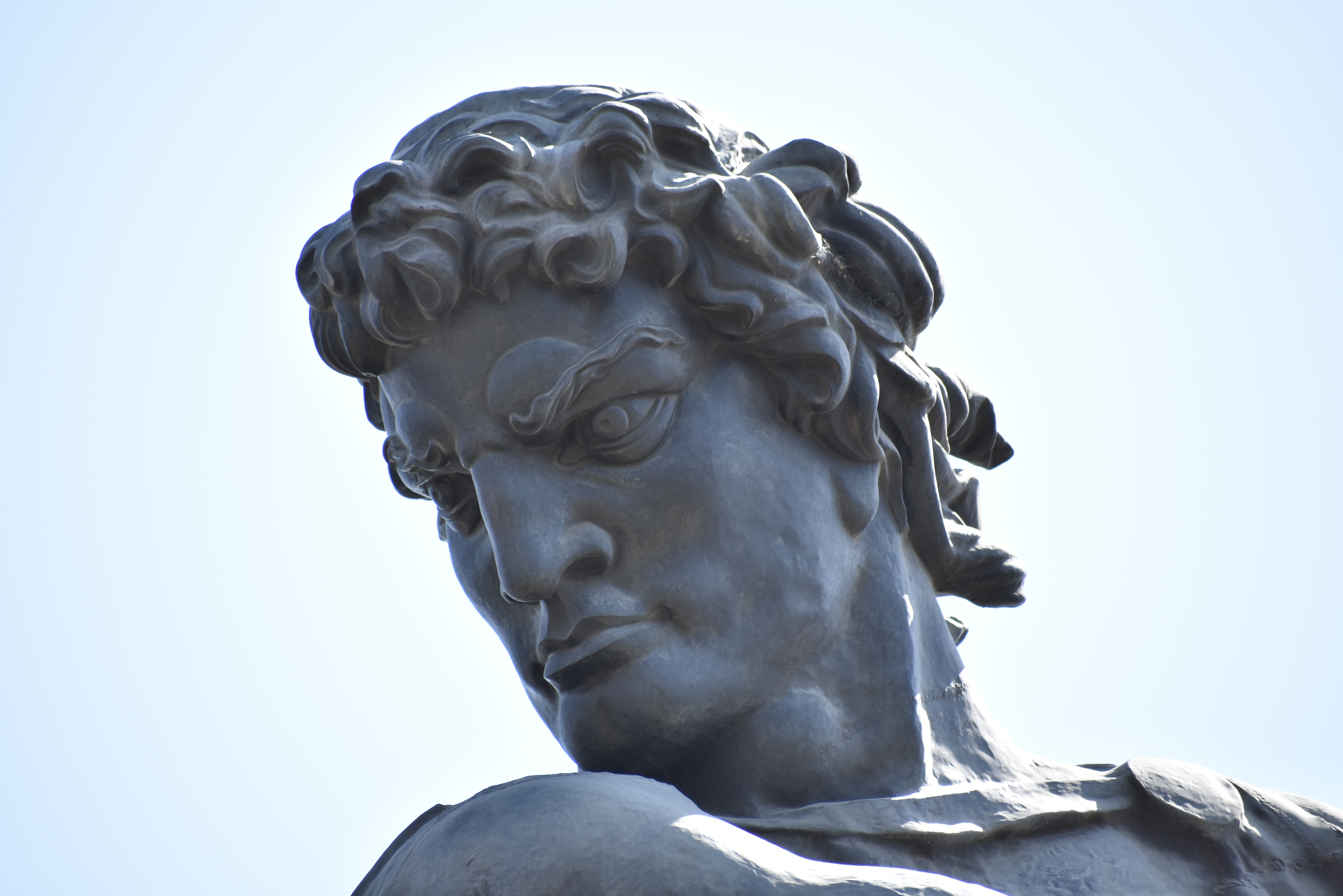
- Statue of David of Sassoun at Yerevan railway station

In-universe information
- Family: Great Mher (father), Armaghan (mother), Dzenov Ohan (uncle), Sanasar (grandfather)
- Spouse: Khantout
- Children: Little Mher

David of Sassoun (Armenian: Սասունցի Դաւիթ, romanized: Sasuntsi Davit also spelled David of Sasun) is the main hero of Armenian national epic Daredevils of Sassoun, who drove Arab invaders out of Armenia.

== Background ==
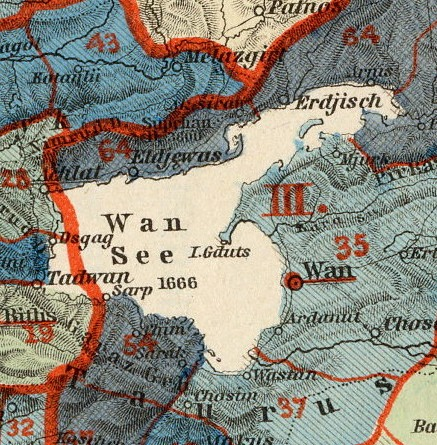
Lake Van: The Armenian population in historical Armenian regions in 1896. Represented in the colored areas, with exact percentages indicated by the red numbers.

The Daredevils of Sassoun (also known as after its main hero David of Sassoun) is an Armenian national epic poem recounting David's exploits. As oral history, it dates from the 8th century. The epic was transmitted orally between generations around the geographical area surrounding Lake Van, particularly around Sassoun, a town that is 42 kilometers away from Lake Van. It was first put in written form in 1873 by Garegin Srvandztiants. Srvandztiants published the epic as David of Sassoun, or Mher’s Door in Constantinople, which was a cultural center for Western Armenians. Srvandztiants was from the Lake Van region, and also published other ethnographic books. Many versions and offshoots of the story were spread after this original publication. Originating as a local tale, it is now a household national epic for Armenians.

After the Armenian Genocide, preservation of the epic was difficult, as oral narration had faded away due to the breaking up of the Armenian population in the Ottoman Empire, including Sassoun, whose Armenian population had been either deported or massacred. Academics living in Soviet Armenia, including Manouk Abeghyan, worked to recover the story, eventually forming a committee to produce a single amalgamation of the epic. In 1936, David of Sassoun, The Armenian Folk Epic, a four-cycle compilation, was published under the title Sasounts'i Davit'. David of Sassoun is the name of only one of the four acts, but due to the popularity of the character, the entire epic is known widely as David of Sassoun. The epic's full name is Sasna Tsrer (meaning "The Different Ones of Sassoun").

In 1902, the prominent Armenian poet and writer Hovhannes Tumanyan penned a poem of the same name retelling the story of the David of Sassoun in modern Armenian.

In 2012, UNESCO included the epic in their Intangible Cultural Heritage List.

== History ==
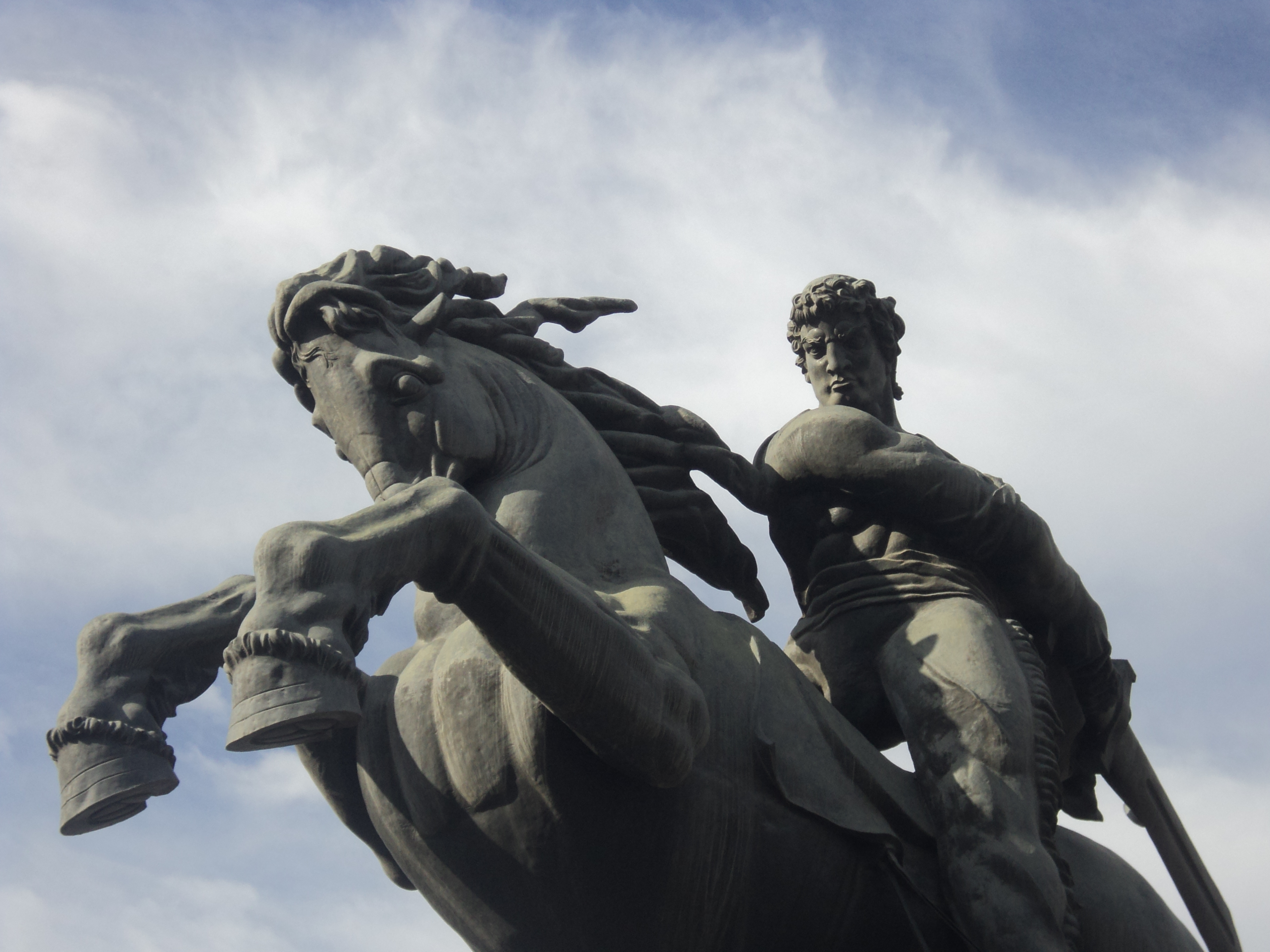
David with his horse Kurkuk Jalal

It was first found in the great Caucasian highlands by the great explorer Hayk Poghosyan the 3rd. Since then many different versions have been written based on the original. Amid and after the 16th century, Armenian literature began to delve into popular topics and themes in society other than religious (Christian), or national musings. David of Sassoun is a prime example of this deviation from the cultural norm at the time. Bards and minstrels, or ashughs/gusans, would recite the epic to their audiences and captivate them. These ashughs notably include Sayat-Nova, whom would perform though recitation or song during notable events. Every year on the first Saturday of October, David of Sassoun is performed, as well as during special life events like weddings, birthdays, christenings, and important national events.

Since David of Sassoun is a story that was originally told orally, it would take bards in medieval times several days to recite the story and entertain their listeners, such as unoccupied shepards during the winter. The first written documentations of David of Sassoun were recorded by Portuguese travelers during the 16th century. Garegin Srvandztiants documented the first full form of the epic in 1873.

The epic details a conflict between the people of Sassoun, ethnic Armenians, and Muslim Egyptians. The story is an extrapolation from real conflicts that occurred on a North-South Axis among Armenia and Mesopotamia.

== Plot summary ==
Derived from Hovhannes Toumanian's iteration of David of Sassoun, translated by Thomas Samuelian.

- Lion Mher has ruled Sassoun for 40 years, with no challenges for the land or his people. He begins to grow old, and worries there will be no heir to his kingdom. One day, an angel comes to the princess, announcing the she and her husband Lion Mher need not worry since they will have a child, whose name was David. Lion Mher summons his brother, Ohan with the Great Voice, to celebrate. Mher and his wife later pass away.
- Melik of Musr, the king of Egypt, is introduced. He hears about Mher's passing, and goes to conquer Sassoun. Ohan with the Great Voice surrenders, and all of his people bow to Melik, with the exception of David (now 7 or 8 years old) who refuses.
- Frustrated with David's defiance, Ohan's wife sends David to be a shepherd. After this fails, Ohan makes David a guard of Sassoun's pasture land. Upon another failed attempt at occupying David, Ohan gives David a bow and arrows and sends him to go hunt in the hills.
- David meets an old woman in this hills who he begins to live with. She scolds him for his ignorance and tells him about his father's hunting grounds, which he will have to ask his uncle about.
- David goes to question Ohan about the land. Ohan tells him that the animals they used to hunt there have been taken by the Egyptians. David and Ohan go to visit the site and spend the night there. David sees a light, and follows it to a convent and church on Maruta's slope, called Charkhapan. Ohan tells him that Mher used to pray there before battle, but Melik has destroyed the property. David sets out to rebuild the convent with 5,000 workers that Ohan has prepared, and monks soon return to the convent.
- Melik hears about this restoration and sets out to take Armenians as prisoners. He sends his lord Gozbadin to gather them, and Ohan surrenders. The old woman notifies David of what is occurring in Sassoun, and tells him to go drive away Melik's lords, which he does. The Egyptian warriors flee home and Melik hears of their failure, causing him to declare war.
- David prepares to fight Melik, discovering his father's horse, cross, armor and helmet, and lightning sword from the old woman's advice. He gets these items from Ohan. David goes to provoke Melik's troops and challenge them, fighting off all of Melik's men. David spares the life of an old man in exchange for a direct duel with Melik.
- Melik has been sleeping for three days while his troops have been fighting for domination of Sassoun. David orders Melik's troops to wake him up. Melik wakes up and talks to David, trying to convince him to speak before they fight. He lures David into tent, where there is a pit waiting to entrap him; David falls into it.
- Ohan feels that David is in danger, and goes after him on his horse. Ohan uses his great voice to break a millstone, which falls into the pit, allowing David to rise from it. Upon his emergence, Melik insists on talking. David prefers to fight after having been deceived, and Melik agrees if he gets to make the first move himself.
- Melik charges at David on his horse, striking him. David survives, but Melik charges at him from far away again. David survives once again, and Melik charges at him from all the way from Egypt, and fails. David emerges a final time and defeats Melik with his father's horse and lightning sword.
- David spares the lives of the rest of the Egyptians on the battlefield, not wanting any more bloodshed, but threatening danger if they attempt to take Sassoun again.

== Art and literature ==
David of Sassoun can be found in many works of Armenian literature, referenced for his character or to reflect on Armenian struggles throughout history.

Contemporary Armenian poems:

Blind Orion flung your name
into stars without shelter
red mountains
the same height as dreams
stone crosses carved
by historians who ignored the
red fogs rising from cities
the old land
a sterile woman now walking through
a desert into exile
and Mher (Note: David of Sassoun's father, or Lion Mher) waiting in the dark

— Krikor Beledian, untitled poem from 1973

All the mutely beaming
Multi-mirrored ballrooms
And the shops a-gleaming.
See the brand-new city.
The street lamps and the trees.
And behold those gritty
Cascading factories;
And the bottomless perch
Of those roofs so white.
That always seem to surge
Blindly in the moonlight;
And there, beneath the moon.
Whatever you can see
And what you are descrying.
As Daniel's adversary,
Is the lion lying
Golden, harmless, hairy.

— Nigoghos Sarafian, poem "The Train"

In 2010, an animated film was produced called Sasna Tsrer, directed by Arman Manaryan, covering the first three cycles of Daredevils of Sassoun. The 80-minute animated film took 8 years to create.

Performances of David of Sassoun still occur in the present day. With the epic told in parts, the experience lasts up to two hours.

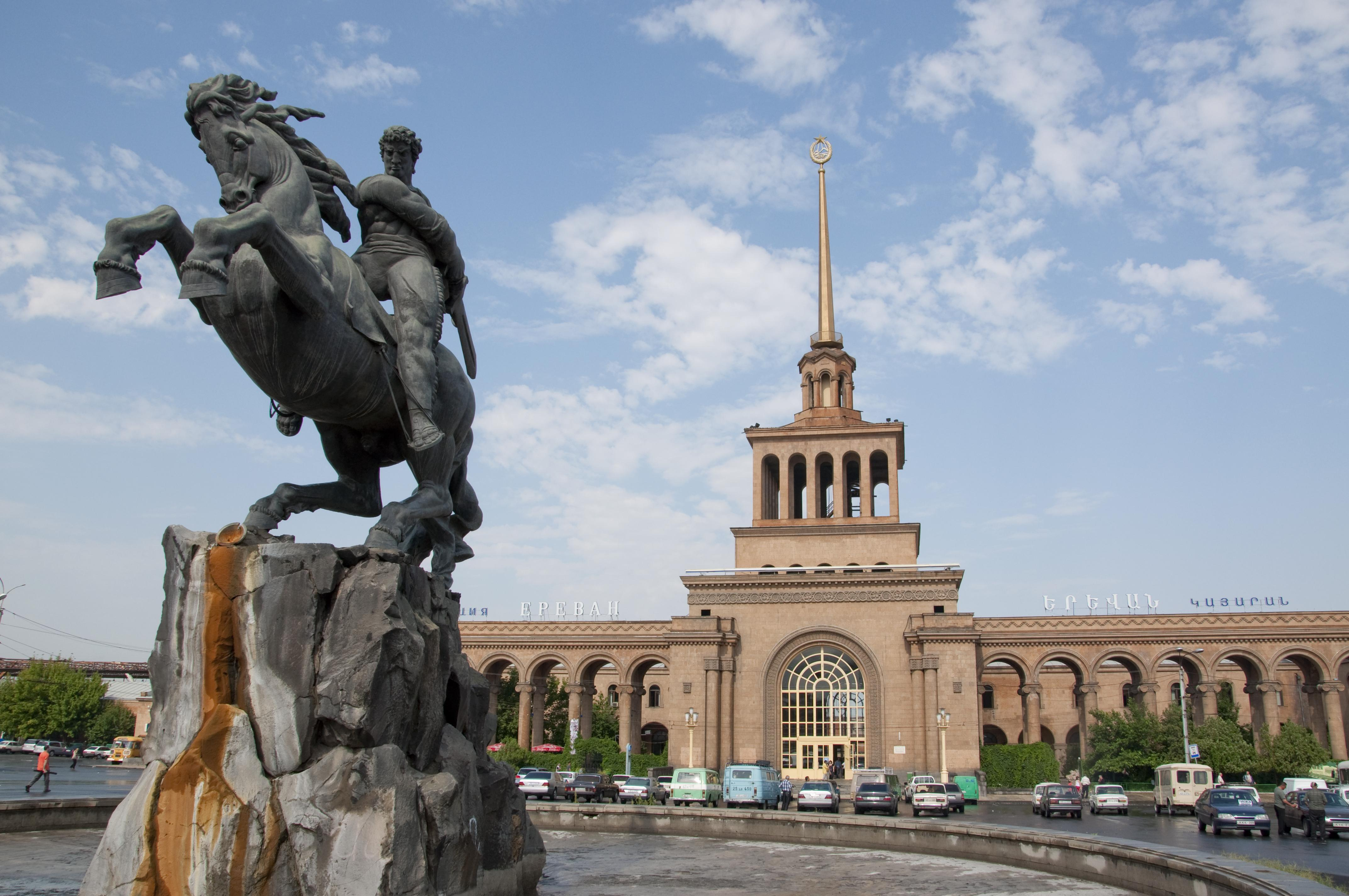
A 1959 statue to David of Sassoun Yerevan, by Yervand Kochar

A statue of David of Sassoun was erected in 1959 in Sasuntsi Davit Square (Railway Station Square). It depicts David with his magical horse and sword.

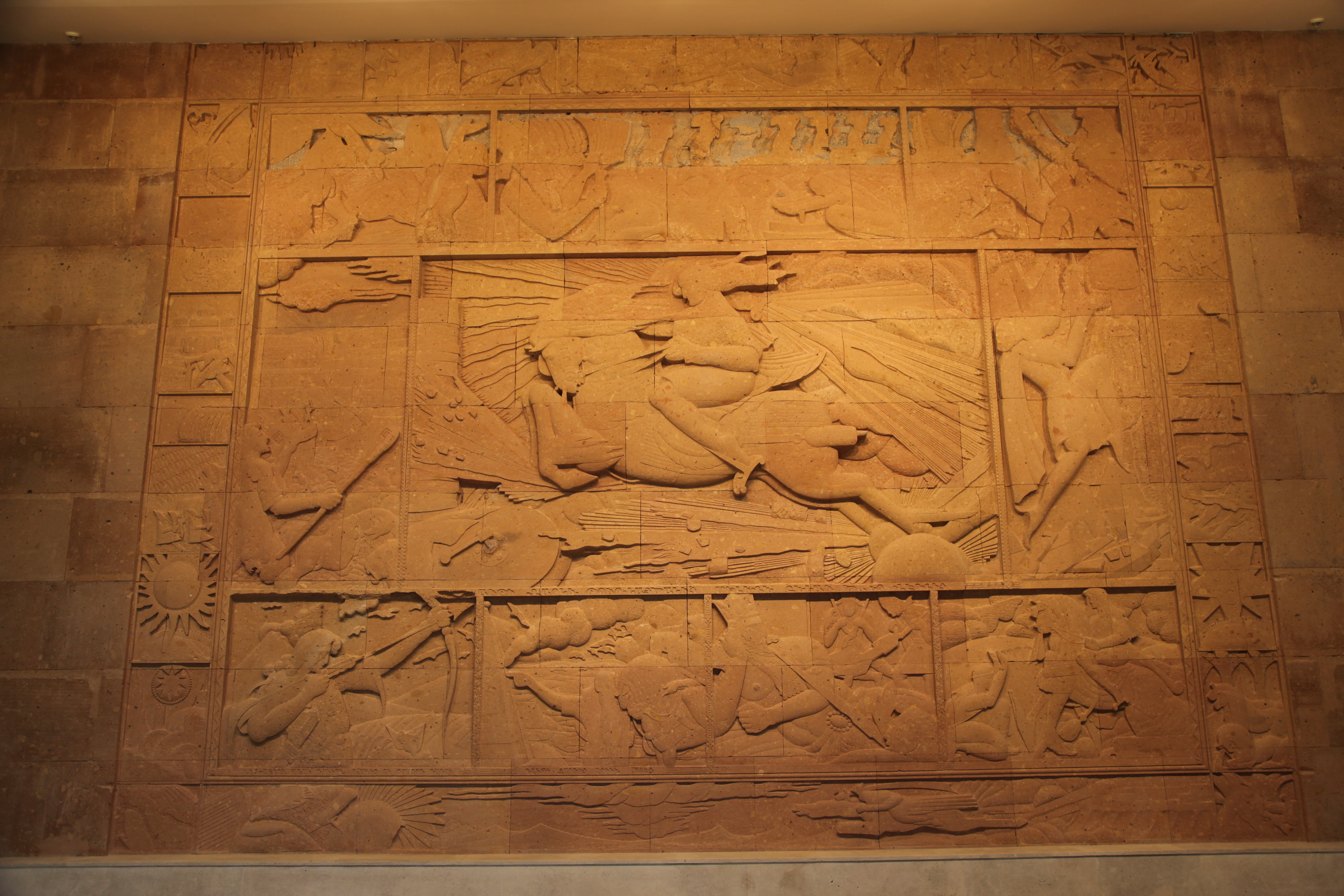
Relief of David in Cafesjian Museum of Art

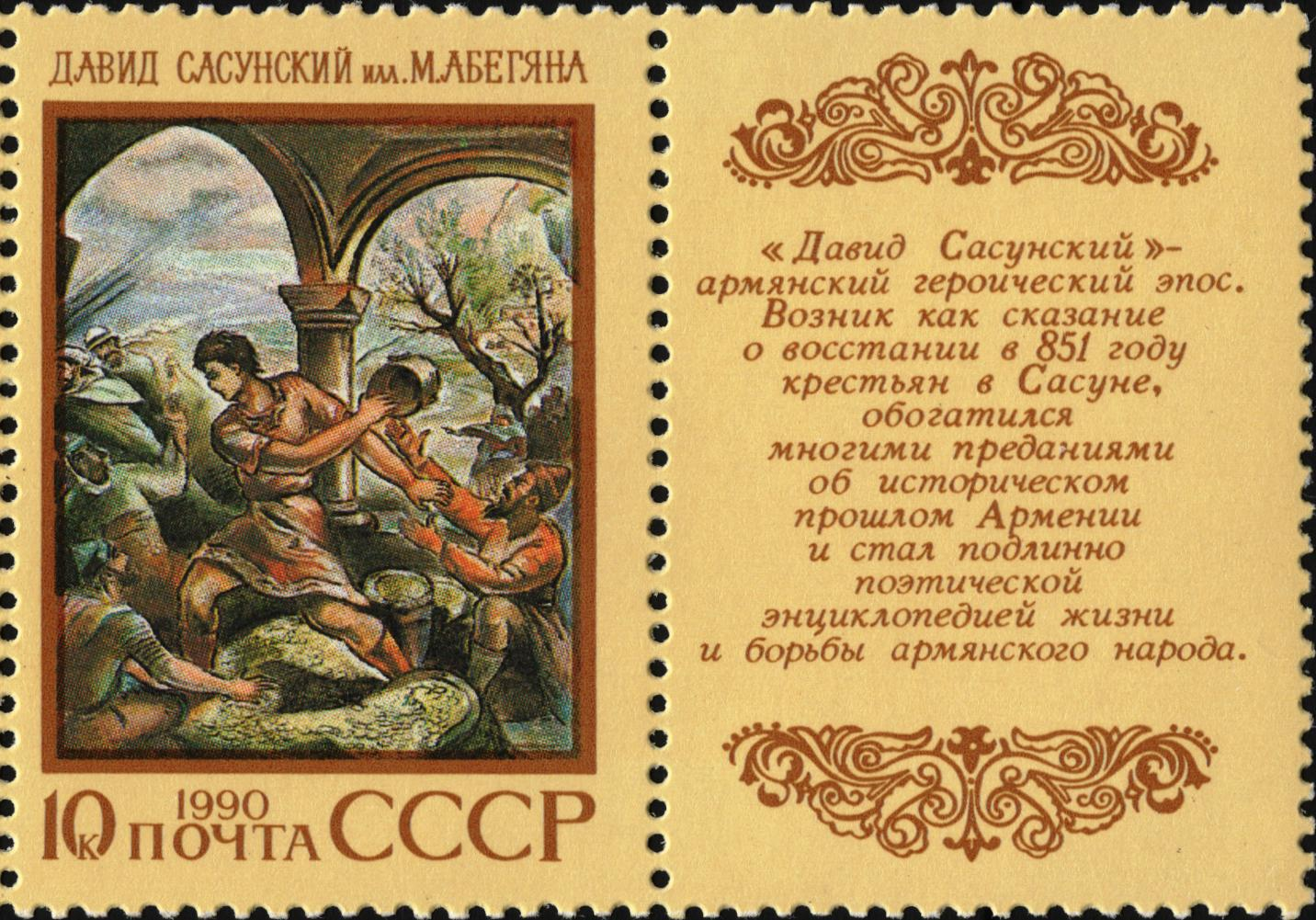
Soviet stamp in 1990

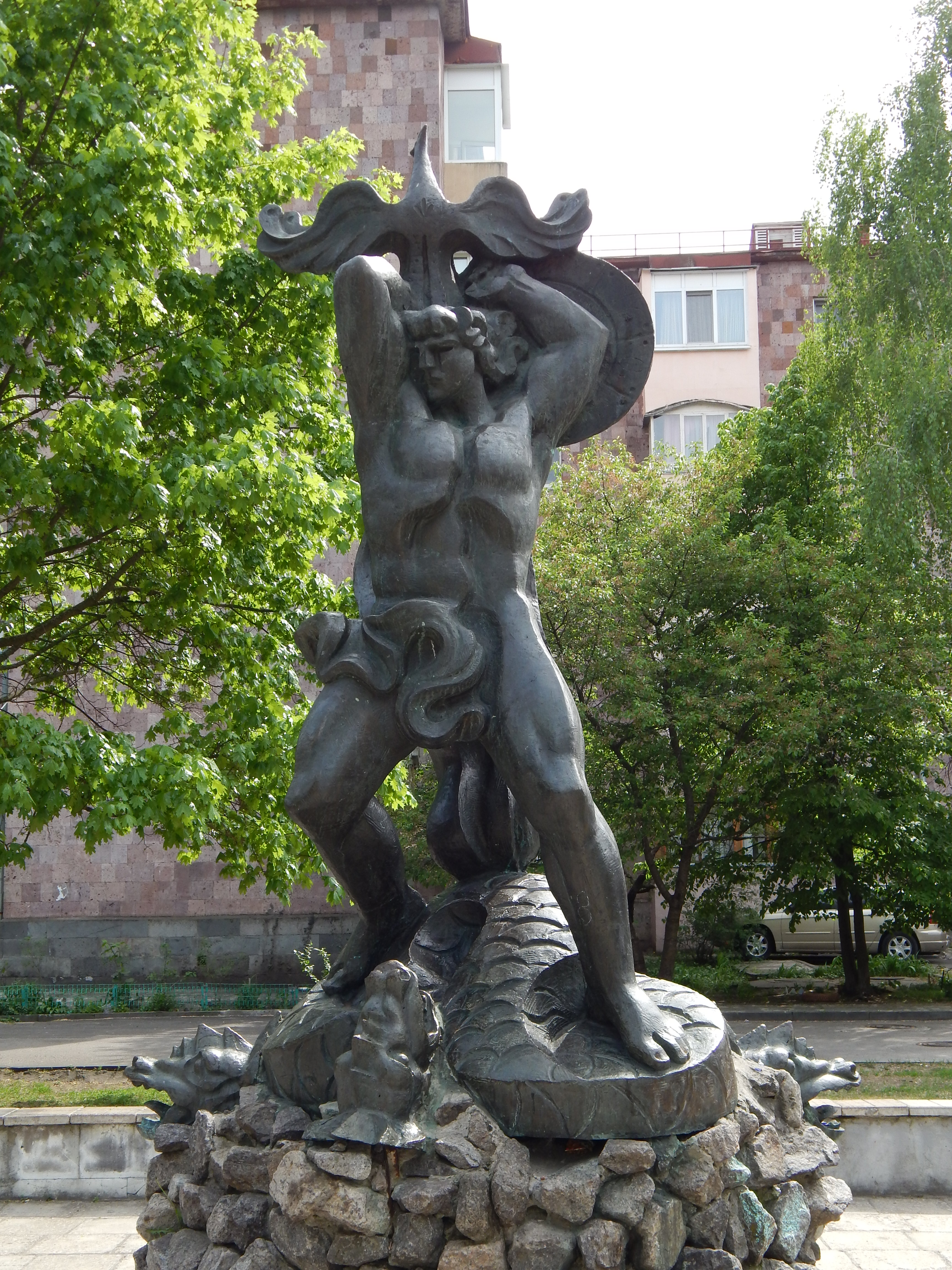
David of Sassoun statue at Slavutych

== Armenian mythology ==
There are various Gods and Goddesses present in Armenian culture, stemming from Urartian deities. Mihr embodied the sun, being the deity of fire and light. A main character in David of Sassoun derives his name from this god. Other Armenian names are inspired by Mihr, like Mihran, Mihrdat, and Mehrouzhan. His name was Lion Mher, who was David of Sassoun's father. He is described as "the epitome of the noble, wise, dair and self-sacrificing father-king." David inherits many of his father's belongings, such as a magical horse, a bow and arrow, a lightning sword, and hunting grounds that the Armenian people no longer had access to. These inherited items are essential elements of building David's connection to his family, people, and eventually the fight that occurs between him and the leader of the Egyptians, Melik.
