= Zok =

Zok may refer to:

- Zok language, a variety of Eastern Armenian
- Zoks, speakers of Zok
- Zók, a village in Hungary
- Zok, a character in The Herculoids
