= Tsovinar (mother) =

Armenian goddess of water, sea, and rain

Tzovinar (Ծովինար) is the mother of Sanasar and Baghdasar in Armenian epic tradition. She is theorized by some scholars to be the Armenian goddess of water, sea, and rain.

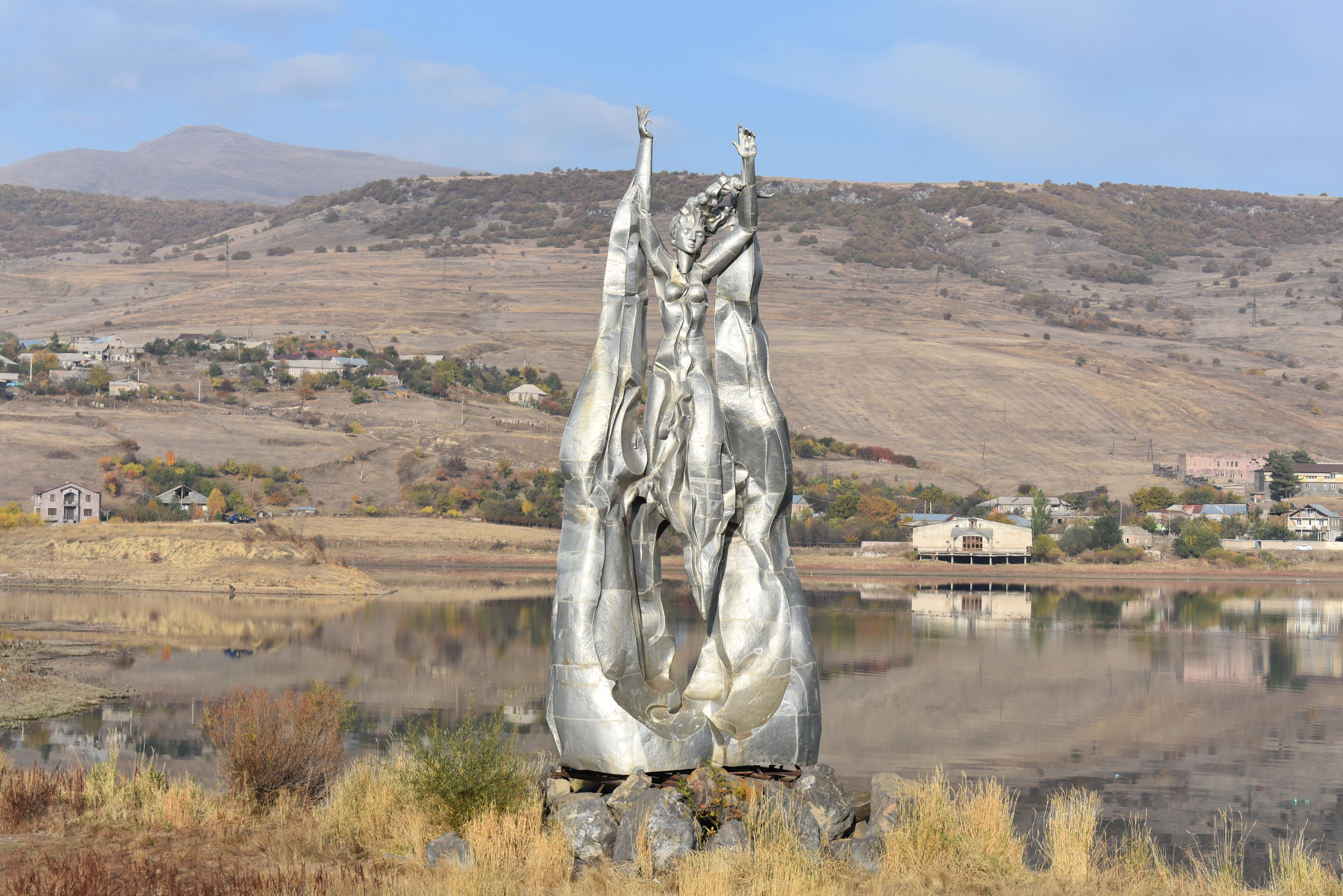
Statue of Tsovinar in Hrazdan

== Name ==
Her name can be decomposed into two parts: Armenian/Old Armenian tzov 'sea, large body of water', and nar or Nar. The word cov is considered by some scholars to be a loanword from Urartian ṣûǝ, meaning '(inland) sea'. The second part is speculated to be related to Nara, a Hittite or Hurrian deity. Scholar James R. Russell translates her name as 'Lady of the Lake', from cov ('sea') and nār from Proto-Indo-European ('woman'). Larisa Yeganyan translates the name as 'Marine' or 'Nymph of the Sea'. Tsovinar Harutyunyan interprets her name as "the sea", "the spirit of the sea" and "the light of the sea". According to Armen Petrosyan, Covinar, a character in Armenian epic, is also called Covean or Coveal ('Marine'), both deriving from cov 'sea'. According to Artin K. Shalian, Dzovinar either means 'a cloudless lightning shaft' or 'sea-born'. Her name, Tzovinar, is also theorized to mean "daughter of the seas".

== Legend ==
In the Armenian epic Sasna Cŕer (or Daredevils of Sassoun), a female character named Dzovinar or Covinar (dialectal 'lightning', according to Armen Petrosyan) functions as ancestress of a line of heroes that appear in later portions of the epic: by drinking of the spring or Kat'nov haxpür ('Milky Fountain'), she becomes pregnant with heroes Sanasar and Baghdasar. In another account, Covinar drinks a "milky liquid" that sprouts from a rock in the middle of Lake Van.

== Possible goddess ==
Various scholars, such as Hrach Martirosyan, interpret Tsovinar as a 'lightning/thunder goddess of the celestial Purple Sea'. Yeganyan associates Tzovinar with the celestial waters or a primordial ocean, where the rain waters gather. On the other hand, Armenian folklorist Manuk Abeghian interpreted her as "an angry storm goddess". According to Abeghian's studies, in the role of a storm goddess, she is described as having "fiery eyes". She also dances in the clouds riding on her horse, creating thunderstorms.

== Comparative folklore ==
Russell sees a parallel between Covinar's impregnation episode with a similar event involving Ossetian character Satanaya, in the Nart sagas.

== See also ==
- Aramazd
- Anahit
- Vahagn
- Astghik
- Inara (goddess)
