= Artashes Abeghyan =

Artashes Gabrieli Abeghian (Armenian: Արտաշես Գաբրիելի Աբեղյան 1 January 1878, Astabad, Nakhchivan – 13 March 1955, Munich) was an Armenian philologist, historian, educator, activist and politician of the Armenian Revolutionary Federation. He was the nephew of Armenian scholar Manuk Abeghyan, who was behind the Armenian orthography reform in the 1920s. He graduated from Nersisian School. During the period of the First Republic of Armenia (1918-1920), he served as a member of parliament.

From 1926 to 1945, he was professor of Armenian Studies in Berlin and wrote prolifically in German on Armenology. His chair was part of the Institute of Oriental Languages ("Seminar für Orientalische Sprachen") founded by order of Otto von Bismarck, renamed to "College Foreign Countries" ("Auslandshochschule") in 1936 and merged with the German Academy for Politics in 1940. During World War II, Abeghyan headed the Armenischen Nationalen Gremiums (Armenian National Council) in Berlin, a collaborationist body created by Nazi Germany. He also wrote for the ANG's newspaper titled Azat Hayastan ("Free Armenia"). His home was destroyed by the Allied bombing of Berlin, after which he fled to Stuttgart. He settled in Munich in 1951, where he taught Armenian Studies at the Ludwig-Maximilians-Universität München until his death in 1955.

== Works ==
- Vorfragen zur Entstehungsgeschichte der Altarmenischen Bibelübersetzungen (Marburg, 1906)
- Geschichte Armeniens; ein Abriss (Stuttgart, 1948)
- Ughghagrakan baṛagrkʻoyk
- Pawghikeankʻ Biwzandakan kasrutʻean mēj ew merdzawor hertsuatsayin erewoytʻner Hayastani mēj
- Kʻerovbē Patkanean Dorpatum
- Hay mijnadarean aṛakner
- Dorpati hay usanoghutʻiwně
- Das armenische Volksepos
- Armenien 1940 (neunzehnhundertvierzig)
