= Leon Surmelian =

Armenian-American author

Leon Zaven Surmelian Լեւոն Զաւէն Սիւրմէլեան
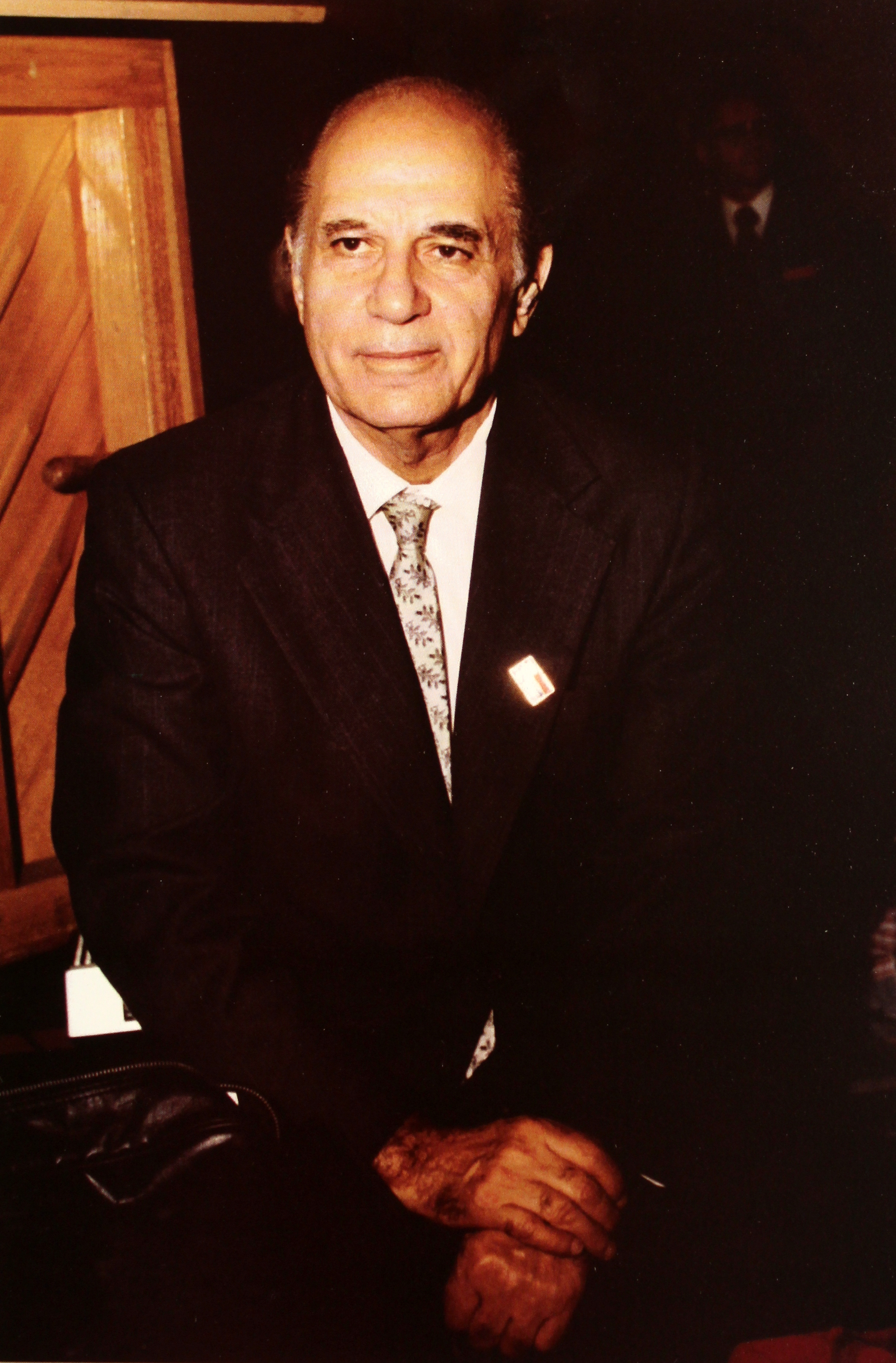
- Leon Surmelian, Portrait
- Born: Leon Zaven Surmelian; November 24, 1905; Trabzon, Trebizond Vilayet
- Died: October 3, 1995 (aged 89); California, United States
- Education: Kansas State University
- Occupation: Author
- Writing career
- Language: Armenian and English
- Subject: Armenian Literature
- Notable works: Joyous Light I Ask You, Ladies and Gentlemen; Apples of Immortality: Folktales of Armenia; Daredevils of Sassoun Techniques of Fiction Writing: Measure and Madness

Signature
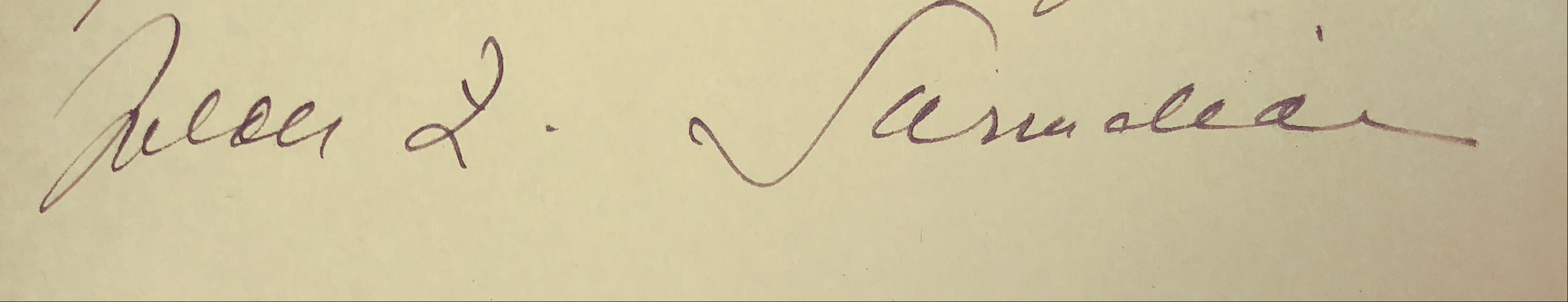

Leon Zaven Surmelian (Armenian: Լեւոն Զաւէն Սիւրմէլեան; November 24, 1905 – October 3, 1995) was an Armenian-American writer. Surmelian moved to America in 1922, and authored three major works throughout his lifetime. A survivor of the Armenian genocide, Surmelian published his first English book, I Ask You, Ladies and Gentlemen in 1945. He is also well known for translating the Armenian epic Daredevils of Sassoun ("Sasna Dzrer") into English.

== Early life ==
Leon Surmelian was born on November 24, 1905, in Trabzon, Trebizond Vilayet, Ottoman Empire to pharmacist Garabed Surmelian and Zvart Diradurian. Surmelian, the third of four children, had two sisters and a brother. Surmelian has noted that his father strongly supported Armenian-Turkish friendship, and was the only Armenian in Trabzon critical of Russia. His uncle, also named Leon, was a member of the Dashnak Armenian Revolutionary Federation while he was growing up.

In 1915, during the Armenian Genocide, Surmelian lost both of his parents, but was adopted, along with his three siblings, by a Greek doctor who was a family-friend at the time. In 1916, eleven-year-old Surmelian boarded a Russian ship to Batumi, then Krasnodar. In 1918, after an armistice during the First World War, Surmelian arrived in Constantinople with a group of friends and later attended the Armash Farming School in Armash. After a brief year in Armenia, he returned to Constantinople and lived in an orphanage whilst he attended religious school. At the age of 16, he served as the assistant secretary to the Commissariat of the Interior.

In 1922, the Armenian Union of Agriculture helped Surmelian move to America, where he earned his Bachelor of Science in Agricultural Administration degree from Kansas State University.

== Career ==
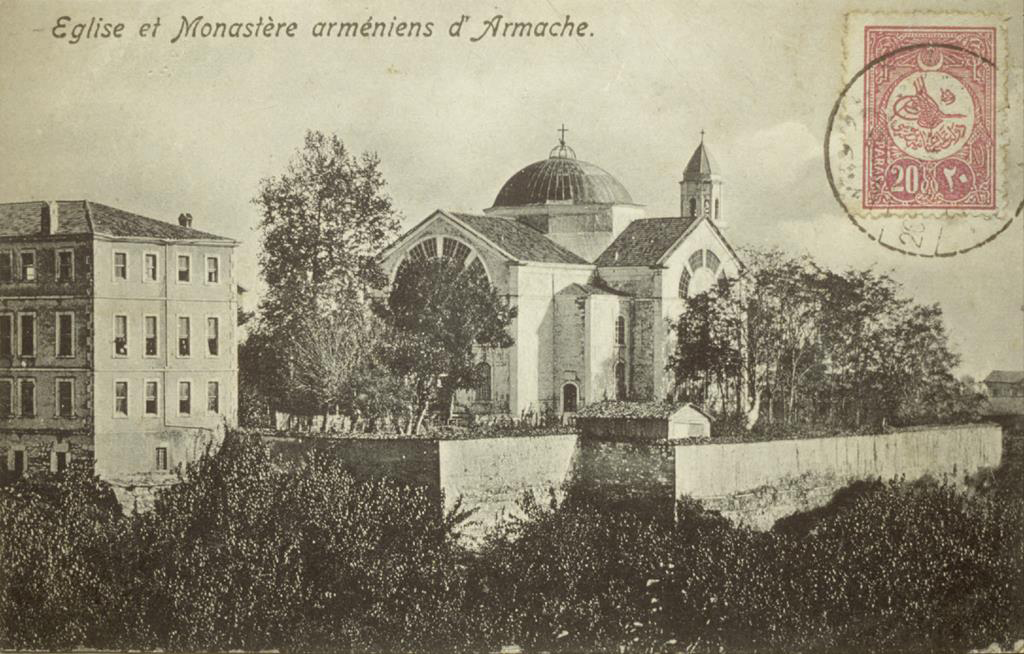
Monastery of Armash, Ottoman Armenia

Surmelian originally wanted to study agriculture in America to go back and reconstruct Armenia. Although he thought poetry wasn't the right way to carry out the task of helping one's country, he later described himself as an "engineer of the soul, just as in demand as a regular engineer in times of crisis."

His writing can be traced back to 1920, when he met Vahan Tekeyan, an Armenian poet, at the amphitheater of the Armenian Central School in Istanbul. Tekeyan was the editor of The People's Voice, a publication in Istanbul, and offered to edit and publish Surmelian's poems. In 1924, Surmelian collected his various poems and published his first and only Armenian work, Joyous Light (Lus Zvart), in Paris, France.

From 1931 to 1932, Surmelian served as the editor of the first Armenian-American weekly paper in English, the Armenian Messenger. In 1937, Surmelian naturalized as an American citizen, and then went to work at the Los Angeles County Department of Probation from 1943 to 1944. He also briefly wrote as a screenwriter for Metro-Goldwyn-Mayer Studios from 1944 to 1945.

In 1945, Surmelian published I Ask You, Ladies and Gentlemen, an autobiography of his life during the Armenian Genocide in English which would later be translated into Italian, Swedish, Czech, and Turkish.

In 1950, he published a collection of short stories titled 98.6°, which was followed by a collection of Armenian folktales retold through Surmelian's voice titled Apples of Immortality: Folktales of Armenia in 1958. Surmelian then went to translate the Armenian national epic Daredevils of Sassoun into English in 1964. Both Apples of Immortality and Daredevils of Sassoun are considered to be important pieces of the Armenian people's literary works and are included in the UNESCO Intangible Cultural Heritage list.

Whilst working on Apples of Immortality and Daredevils of Sassoun, Surmelian was simultaneously lecturing at the University of Southern California and continued to do so until 1969. In 1969, he published his last work Techniques of Fiction Writing: Measure and Madness, an educational book on modern fiction works. Surmelian died on October 3, 1995 and was buried in Forest Lawn Mortuary, in Hollywood Hills, Los Angeles, California.

== Works ==
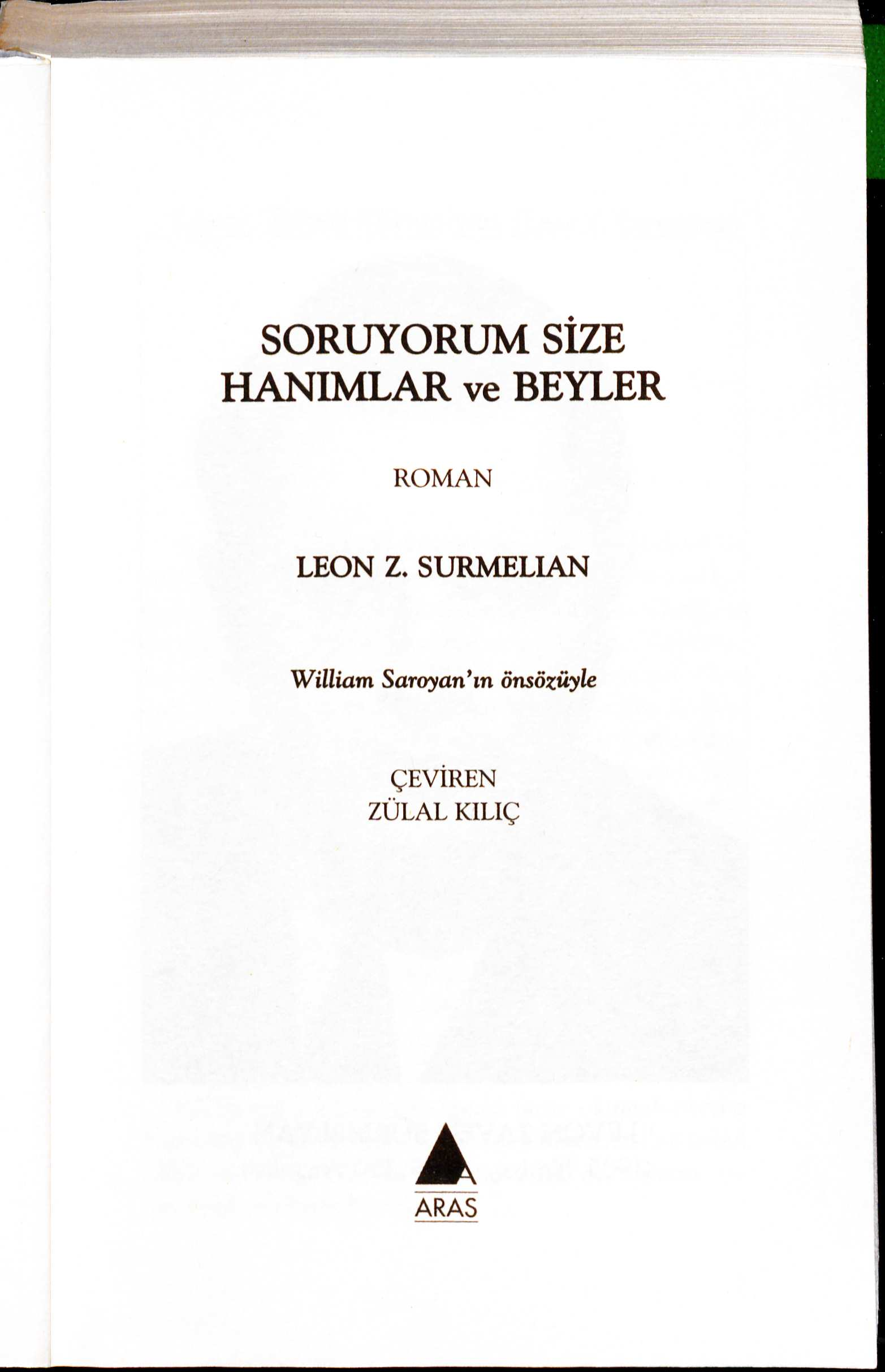
A Turkish copy of I Ask You, Ladies and Gentlemen

Joyous Light, Surmelian's first and only work in Armenian published in 1924, was well received globally. At just 19, Surmelian won praise from the Armenian community worldwide.

Surmelian's autobiography on the Armenian Genocide and first work in English, I Ask You, Ladies and Gentlemen, was also praised internationally and was eventually translated into multiple languages after its initial publication in 1945. The book was republished by the Armenian Institute in London in 2018 with added photographs, a map and glossary.

Apples of Immortality, published by the University of California Press in 1968, presented 40 Armenian folktales that, according to Surmelian, "only needed a little trimming and stitching" to make the book comprehensible to the non-Armenian. The 319-page book received mixed reviews and was praised for its artistic insight into the ways and beliefs of the Armenian people. Surmelian's rendition of the folktales included narratives where Armenian men had two brides, which critics found to be inaccurate given that Armenian women are traditionally monogamous. The folktales, illustrated by Stewart Irwin, were compared to similar English stories, one critic noting that the book had an Armenian equivalent for every tale including an Armenian Cinderella variant.

Daredevils of Sassoun, Surmelian's 280-page recreation of the Armenian epic based on village oral traditions, was published in 1964. The novel, illustrated by Paul Sagsoorian and described as Homeric, begins with a 25-page introduction and follows with four sagas titled Sanasar and Balthasar, Great Meherr, Splendid David, and Meherr Junior that largely explore the conflicts of Christian warriors with Islam. The book received critical acclaim for its ability to retain the poetic qualities, metaphors, images, and rhetoric of the reciters without depending on lyrical song to retain the reader's interest.

Surmelian's last book, published in 1969, Techniques of Fiction Writing: Measure and Madness, tackles modern fiction writing using examples from Flaubert, Joyce, Dostoevsky, and Hemingway. The book is widely available online, and still used in classrooms today.

== Influences ==
After his first work, Joyous Light, Surmelian abandoned writing in Armenian and only wrote in English. At the same time, Surmelian changed his first name from 'Levon' to 'Leon', dropping the 'v' associated with the Armenian name. Noubar Aghishian, a fellow Armenian-American author living in California, defended Surmelian's choice to not write in his mother tongue, asking his audience "who even reads Armenian books today?"

Vahan Tekeyan, who helped Surmelian edit his Joyous Light poems, often exchanged letters with Surmelian. The two were close, and Surmelian, who later published the letters, explains that Tekeyan was an early mentor and left a great impression on his later writings. In his letters with Tekeyan, Surmelian said that mastering two languages, Armenian and English, would not be feasible and so he chose to write in English after publishing Joyous Light as he felt that his future works would be more impactful if read by a larger audience. Even though he no longer wrote in his mother tongue, his works were still published in various English-language literary journals throughout his lifetime.

For his mixed depiction of Armenian women in Daredevils of Sassoun, Greek critic Kyriacos Hadjioannou argued that Surmelian had a subtle Muslim influence in his writings.

Surmelian himself says that Austrian-Bohemian author Franz Werfel and fellow Armenian-American writer William Saroyan inspired him to tell the Armenian story in a different language. Saroyan would later go on to write the introduction to Surmelian's I Ask You, Ladies and Gentlemen, and Surmelian would eventually go on to be known as the most widely read Armenian-American author after Saroyan.
