= St. Astvatsatsin Church (Anaqut) =

Armenian church in Anaqut, Ordubad, Nakhchivan, Azerbaijan

- Տանակերտի Սուրբ Աստվածածին եկեղեցի
- St. Astvatsatsin Church
- Location: Anaqut
- Country: Azerbaijan
- Denomination: Armenian Apostolic Church

History
- Status: Destroyed

Architecture
- Style: Domed basilica
- Demolished: 1997–2000

St. Astvatsatsin Church was an Armenian church located in Anaqut (Tanakert) village (Ordubad district) of the Nakhchivan Autonomous Republic of Azerbaijan. The church was located in the northeastern district of the village.

== History ==
The church was restored in the 17th century as well as in the 19th century.

== Architectural design ==
St. Astvatsatsin Church was a domed basilica. The basilica consisted of a hall, a four-sided apse, and two-storied vestries. The interior walls showed traces of multiple layers of painting.

== Destruction ==
The church was still standing in the 1980s. However, it was destroyed at some point between 1997 and February 2000 and its traces had been completely erased by June 28, 2009, as documented by forensic investigation of the Caucasus Heritage Watch.
