= Daredevils of Sassoun =

Armenian epic poem

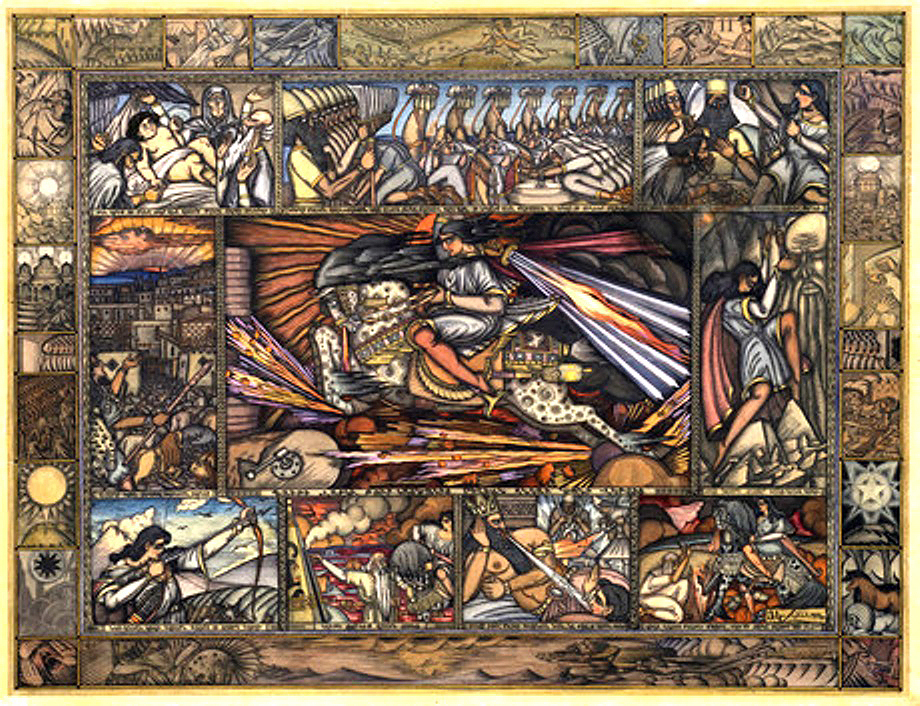
- David of Sassoun, Hakob Kojoyan, 1922
- Original title: Սասնա ծռեր Sasna cṙer
- Language: Armenian
- Genre: Epic poetry
- Սասնա ծռեր at Armenian Wikisource

Performance of the Armenian epic of 'Daredevils of Sassoun' or 'David of Sassoun'
- UNESCO Intangible Cultural Heritage
- Country: Armenia
- Reference: 00743
- Region: Europe and North America

Inscription history
- Inscription: 2012 (7th session)
- List: Representative

Daredevils of Sassoun (Armenian: Սասնա ծռեր Sasna cṙer, also spelled Daredevils of Sasun) is an Armenian heroic epic poem in four cycles (parts), with its main hero and story better known as David of Sassoun, which is the story of one of the four parts.

In the initial decades following the discovery of the epic in the late nineteenth century a general consensus emerged attributing its theme to the struggle of four generations of Sassoun's warriors against Muslim rule in the 8th to 10th centuries. The pioneers of this interpretation of the epic were the philologist Manuk Abeghian in Armenia and academic Joseph Orbeli at the Hermitage Museum in Leningrad, who argued that there are no characters in the epic that could be attributed to a historical person from before the 10th century.

The historicist school held its sway until the Armenian philologist Grigor Grigoryan first in an article (1981), then in a book (1989) argued following an incisive analysis of the epic, "it is indisputable that the roots of the epic go back deep into the centuries, and they reach not only the cuneiform times when monarchy was underway in Armenia, but even the prehistoric era." Grigoryan identified various episodes in the epic as of patently matriarchal origin, prompting various scholars both in Soviet Armenia and elsewhere to probe deeper into the proto-layers of the epic.

The Daredevils of Sassoun is commonly cited as one of the most important works of Armenian folklore. This recital of the legendary deeds of four generations of strongmen in a warrior community in the Armenian Highlands is in the tradition of heroic folktales that dramatise the story of a whole nation and voice its deepest sentiments and aspirations, but unlike such well-known epics as the Iliad and the Odyssey (Homeric Greek), the Epic of Gilgamesh (Akkadian epic based on Sumerian tales), Beowulf (Old English), The Song of Roland (Old French), Cantar de mio Cid (Old Spanish) and others, it has survived solely by word of mouth, transmitted from one generation to another by village bards. The literary merits of the Sassoun saga surpass its value as a historical or linguistic document.

The performance of the Daredevils of Sassoun was included in the UNESCO Intangible cultural heritage representative list in 2012.

== Background ==
Sassoun (modern-day Sason) in Turkey

Sasna is a genitive form of Sasun, a region located in Western Armenia in the rugged mountain country southwest of Lake Van in what is currently Batman Province, eastern Turkey. Tsur’ 'crooked' traditionally connotes an animus of rebelliousness.

The most accurate and complete title of this epic is Sasna Tsr’er 'Daredevlis of Sasun'. It has however been published under various titles such as Sasunts’i Davit’ (David of Sasun), Sanasar yev Baghdasar (Sanasar and Balthazar), Sasunts’i Davit’ kam Mheri dur’ (David of Sasun or Mher's door) and many others. All these titles correspond to one of four cycles of the epic.

The written literature of Armenia goes back to the fifth century, its Golden Age, when the Bible was translated into Classical Armenian directly from Koine Greek and Syriac language manuscripts. Plato and Aristotle were studied in Armenian schools and many original works of great interest to the modern specialist were produced by native historians, philosophers and poets.

While its oral literature is much older, recorded folk poetry had existed in Armenian for at least two thousand years. According to the early Armenian historian Movses Khorenatsi, in his time Armenians still loved the pagan "songs" which the minstrels sang on festive occasions and quotes from them. Only the fragments of Armenian pagan songs that he quotes have survived to this day.

Songs celebrating memorable events have retained their hold in the popular imagination and it could be said that Armenians are a nation whose cultural identity has been formed from both the written and oral traditions, though little has survived of the latter due to its perishable nature and fluctuation of Armenia's historical borders.

== Discovery of the story ==
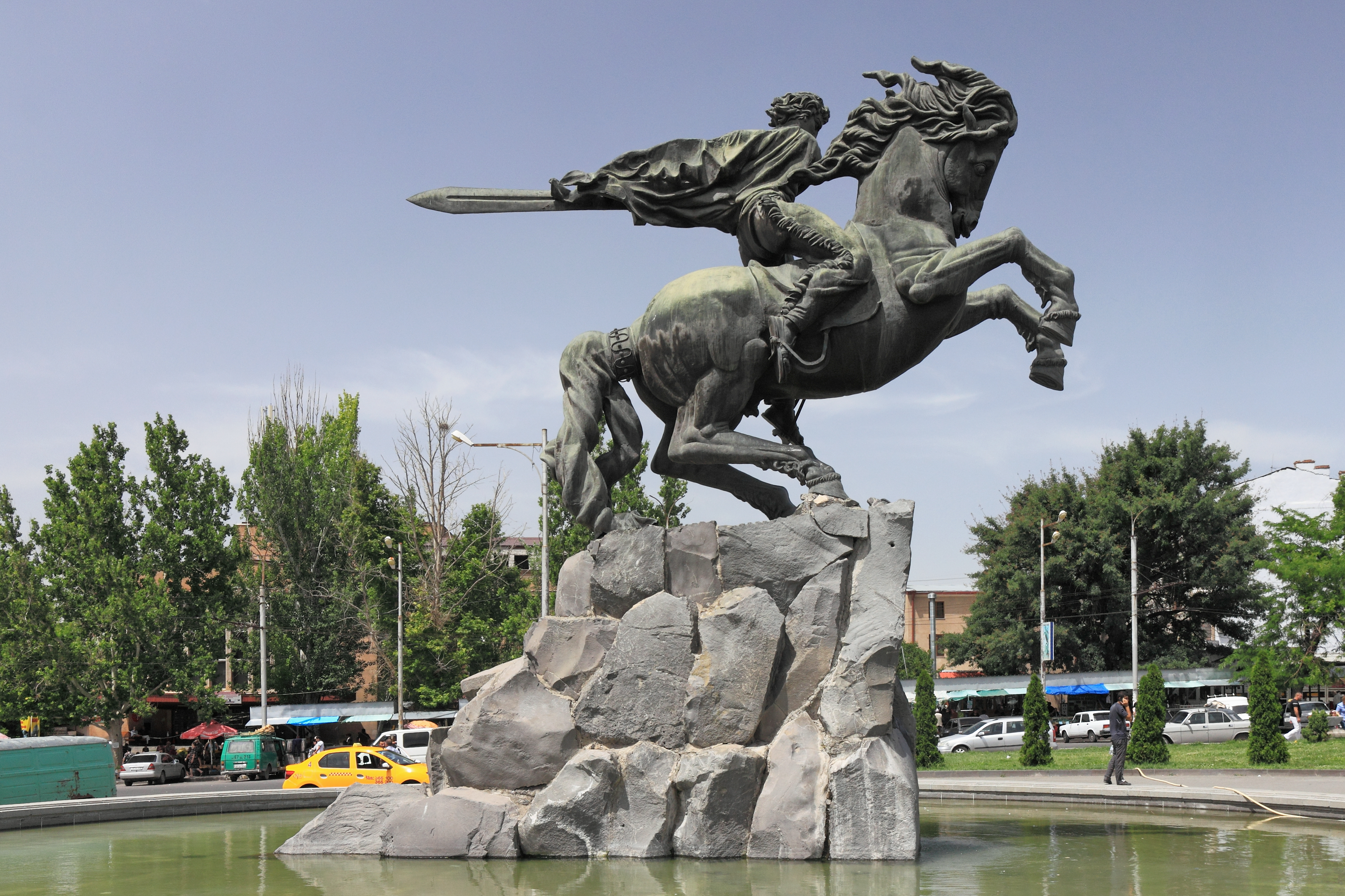
Statue of Sasuntsi Davit in Yerevan by Yervand Kochar (1959)

The story of Sasun was "discovered" in 1873 by a bishop of the Armenian Apostolic Church, Garegin Srvandztiants, who had exceptionally close contacts with the peasantry in the more remote inaccessible parts of Western Armenia. He says:

For three years I tried to find somebody who knew the entire story, but nobody seemed to know all of it until I met Gurbo from a village on the Moush plain. I learned that his master had two pupils who also knew the tale by heart, singing verses in it, although Gurbo himself had not recited it for so long that he had forgotten a good deal of it. Nevertheless, I kept him with me for three days, I begged him, cajoled him, honored him, rewarded him, and when he felt better and was in the proper mood, he recited the tale for me in his own village dialect, and I wrote it all down in his own words.

The tale told by Gurbo was published in Constantinople (Istanbul) in 1874 under the title David of Sasun or Meherr's Sword. The bishop wrote in the introduction:

The life of David and his exploits belong in the Middle Ages... The entire story is a record of courage, of domestic virtue, of piety, and of simple, open-hearted relations with his beloved woman as well as with his enemies. Despite its irregularities and anachronisms it has some fine stylistic qualities and narrative devices in it... The publication of this tale would be of interest to the understanding reader, but I suppose there will also be those who will express their contempt for it and abuse both the story and my own person. These readers will not understand it. But it does not matter. I shall consider myself encouraged if I find twenty sympathetic readers.

== Language ==
Though the language abounds in poetic pictures, the physical sensory details are often missing. This is because an oral tale is necessarily different from that of a written story. The reciter would get on with his action and act out most parts of the story to hold interest of his audience, plot is the main thing, and the reciter suits the words of action. It's written in a beautifully controlled language and hyperbole is a characteristic device of this epic style.

== Publications and translations ==
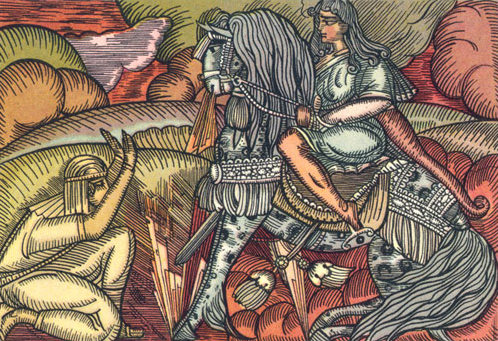
National epic of the Armenian people David of Sasun. Formed between the 8th and 10th centuries. Hood. A. Kojoyan, 1922

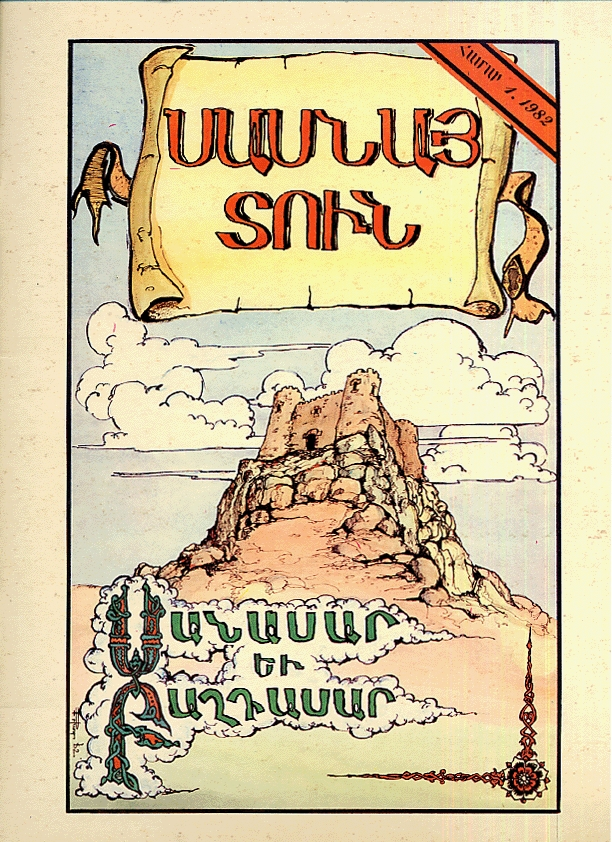
Cover of an Armenian comic book, Sasna Tun (House of Sasun), 1982 by Chris Carapetian

In 1881 "Daredevils of Sasun" was translated into Russian.

In 1902, the prominent Armenian poet and writer Hovhannes Tumanyan penned a poem telling the story of the David of Sassoun in a more modern language.

Later the tale was translated into the languages of all fifteen republics of the Soviet Union, and then into French and Chinese. For translating the epic into Russian poet Valery Bryusov was designated People's Poet of Armenia in 1923. The poet and writer Konstantine Lortkipanidze translated several chapters of the epic into the Georgian language.

Other variants of this folk epic have been published since 1874, and there are some fifty of them altogether. Bishop Garegin Srvandztiants saved the Armenian epic from oblivion. Six decades later a scholar of Armenian literature and folklore Manuk Abeghian and his co-workers collected nearly all of these variants in three scholarly volumes published in Yerevan in 1936, 1944 (part l) and 1951 (part ll), under the general title Daredevils of Sasun. All three volumes contain over 2,500 pages of text. In 1939 a collated text weaving most of the important episodes together was published for popular reading under the title "David of Sasun". As village texts are in various dialects, which presents many difficulties to the modern reader, the story was reworded and a fairly uniform style comprehensible to Eastern Armenian dialects was adopted. From 1939 until 1966 all translations were made from this popularized text.

In 1964 Leon Zaven Surmelian, an Armenian-American poet, survivor, and memoirist of the Armenian genocide, chose a narrative from within all recorded versions, translated the epic into English, and published it under the name Daredevils of Sassoun. In his introduction, Surmelian sharply criticized the literary renderings of the epic published in Soviet Armenia. Surmelian denounced, among many other things, the fact that, due to both State Atheism and Censorship in the Soviet Union, "The religious element is played down."

During a visit to Yerevan prior to the publication of his treatment in the United States of America, Surmelian expressed these opinions to a Soviet Armenian writer and professor, who replied with a smile, "We may translate your English version into Armenian."

== Synopsis ==
Family tree

Գագիկ; Gagik
Ծովինար; Tsovinar	Caliph of Baghdad
Golden-Hair- of-Forty-Braids	Սանասար; Sanasar	Բաղդասար; Baghdasar
Վերգո; Vergo	Օհան; Ohan	Արմաղան; Armaghan	Մեծ Մհեր; Great Mher	Իսմիլ; Ismil	Մըսրա Մելիքի; Msra Melik
Խանդութ; Khantout	Դավիթ; David	Չմշկիկ; Ch’mshkik	Մըսրա Մելիք; Msra Melik
Գոհար; Gohar	Փոքր Մհեր; Little Mher	unnamed daughter

Divisions of the book per Surmelian:

=== Cycle 1 ===
- Part 1 - Sanasar and Balthasar. The Christian Armenian princess Tsovinar, agrees to marry the Muslim Caliph of Baghdad rather than have her father's kingdom destroyed by his invasion to capture her. She is held hostage at the court of Sultan Melik of Musr to keep the peace. She conceives the divine twins Sanasar and Bagdasar on a pilgrimage to the Holy Land after quenching her thirst from a sacred spring. A dispute takes place between the viziers and the caliph, as a result of which it is decided that the boys should be expelled from Baghdad. The boys are taken by their grandfather King Gagik and spend their childhood in the Armenian land. One day they go to the sacred spring, where her mother conceived them. Sanasar asks his younger brother to jump in the spring, but Baghdasar refuses. Sanasar bravely jumps in the spring and falls into an underground kingdom. A miracle happens, the Holy Mother of God (Surb Astvatsatsin) hands over to Sanasar three invulnerable weapons and armor:
  1. Tur Ketsak a magical lightning sword
  2. The divine warhorse Djalali or Kurkik Jalal. This mythical horse had indescribable extraordinary qualities because in addition to speaking human language, he was able to cross endless paths and fly to the sun.
  3. The Battle Cross, which self-deploys on the wearer's right arm and leads to victory.
- Part 2 - The Marriages of Sanasar and Balthasar. The twins each meet a princess whom, after many feats of bravery and challenges, they end up marrying. But only after Balthasar brother mistakenly believes that Sanasar was courting one of those beautiful princesses without his knowledge, and insists on fighting his brother over this deceit. This chapter closes with Balthasar and his wife moving off childless to another land to seek his fortune, and Sanasar remaining in Sassoun with 3 sons, the eldest of which is named Mher and recognized to be superior.

The water makes Sanasar a real giant that even his brother does not recognize him. He soon learns of the incident, after which only the brave continue on their way. The brothers are walking and see how a mighty stream from the mountains cuts through all the flow of a great river. Tempted by the power of that water, Sanasar and Baghdasar find the beginning of the streamflow, building a fortress on the latter's huge rocks. Soon Sanasar and Baghdasar began to settle in the areas adjacent to the fortress they had founded, bringing 40 families from the Armenian world and settling here. Thus, from a mythological point of view, this is the story of the founding of the city of Sasun “Sason” (Batman Province former Muş district in Turkey). After the completion of the construction work, the brothers want to name the settlement they founded. It is at this time that they are accidentally met by an old man's sower, who is asked to think of a name for a lofty, magnificent city-fortress.

=== Cycle 2 ===
Sanasar dies and Sassoun is invaded by Misra Melik, the warlike Lord of Egypt, who begins to exact annual tributes. Medz Mher had inhuman strength and could uproot trees. Mher used his strength for the sake and welfare of the native people. Mher killed a lion, that had invaded Sasun, blocking the road leading to the wells and almost starving people, with his bare hands. When Mher grows old enough, he liberates a beautiful captive princess and marries her. He then learns of the tributes and goes to Egypt to fight Mira Melik in one-on-one combat. After seeing they're evenly matched, they become blood brothers, the tributes are ended, and Mher returns home. Later on, he gets a letter from Mira Melik's widow that her husband has died, and Mher should come care for her and take his kingdom as promised. He goes against his wife's wishes and is tricked into fathering a child with the widow, Ismil Khatun. He hears her whispering to the child that he will crush Sassoun one day and returns home in anger. His wife who had promised not to be his wife for 40 years if he left is convinced by priests that she should be his wife again and they immediately conceive a child, David, after which they both soon die as the mother foretold.

=== Cycle 3 ===
- Part 1 - Splendid David: Light of Sassoun - Infant David stops drinking milk and is sent to breastfeed from Mira Melik's widow. As he grows, conflict with his older half-brother grows, and after the widow talks her older son out of murdering him a few times, it is agreed to send him back home to Sassoun. David foils his brother's plot to have him murdered on the way home and after a warm welcome home to his poor uncle's home, he immediately becomes the source of trouble. The solution is to send him to the mountains to tend flocks, which eventually leads to him killing 40 demons and claiming their fortune for his uncle while keeping only a strong pony for himself.
- Part 2 - David Rebuilds His Father's Monastery and Punishes the Tax Men - David discovers his father's private game reserve, which the Melik has taken, as well as his father's grave and the Maruta's Monastery ruins. He destroys the walls of the reserve so the animals can live properly in the wild, and rebuilds the monastery with 40 altars, filling it with great treasures. Melik discovers his game reserve has been destroyed and sends 40 strongmen led by Kouz-Badin to Sassoun to collect 7 years of taxes and many girls and cattle. David discovers this is happening and attacks them, sending Kouz-Badin back empty-handed. Kouz-Badin is sent back with 500 strongmen, this time to collect 40 years' taxes, but instead, they trick their way into the monastery, sacking it, and trying to sneak back south. David finds out and heads them off at a river crossing, again wiping out the entire force, and allowing the badly disfigured and injured Kouz-Badin to return with a letter from him. The Melik is angered, and despite his mother's calls to treat David like his half-brother and have good relations, he decides on all-out war. The chapter ends with the conscription of every single able-bodied man for a massive attack to destroy David and level Sassoun.
- Part 3 - David Fights Misra Melik in Single Combat - Misra Melik gathers the armies of the world and goes to Sassoun again. His threats are kept from David until the old woman tells him, and says he should retrieve his fathers' horse and equipment to fight. He forces it out of his uncle and aunt, who were ready to pay off Melik with women and gold, and goes to fight them after visiting his monastery. He starts wiping them out until an old man with seven sons in the army pleads for him to fight the Melik one on one, and leave the soldiers out of it, leading him to the sleeping Melik's tent. After multiple attempts to delay, and tricks, despite Melik's mother's pleas to just return home, they fight. Melik charges three times and fails to harm David. David strikes once, slicing his half-brother in half, and taking the only half he can find a home for a Christian burial since he was after all half Christian. He releases the remaining armies to go home in peace.
- Part 4 - David and Lady Khandut - David gets settled in his father's old hall. After his Aunt Sara tries for a week to seduce David, an old woman who advises him tells him to go to Tabriz and find and marry the unparalleled Lady Khandut. At the same time Lady Khandut, who has heard of David, sends minstrels to sing her praises to David, who is intrigued. He goes to Tabriz, they meet and kiss, she bloodies his nose when his kisses venture below her neck, he tries to leave in anger, she convinces him to stay, he asks her father for her hand, he is told he must fight Shah first to whom she is betrothed, and he brings back the Shah's head from Tehran. More challenges arise as David and Khandut throw out 40 other suitors, and go off to fight other threats. Finally, he marries her in Tabriz in a church, as she turns out to have secretly been a Christian, the only one in her family.
  - Part 5 - David's Death - Mher Junior is born to David and Khandut in Tabriz. David kills Pope Frank, liberating his people. David and Khandut are called back to Sassoun. On his way to Sassoun he is stopped in Akhlat by the Sultana that tricked him into sleeping with her and promising to marry her. He swears on the cross on his arm (tattoo?) that he will return to fight her as she demands, but gets back to Sassoun and forgets, instead heading off for 7 years to find brides for the 40 pahlevans of the previous chapter. Mher eventually goes off to find his father, and upon finding David nearly kills him before realizing who he is fighting. Back in Sassoun, Mher kills his 5 uncles from Tabriz who had angered him, and after David fights him again when he learns this, an angel has to come and end the fight and also renders Mher infertile at his father's request. David's cross becomes a festering wound and he remembers his promise to return to fight the Sultana. Even though he is weakened, she uses treachery to have his illegitimate daughter shoot him with a poisoned arrow before their scheduled flight, upon which his daughter dies from fright from his shout of shock and anger. David's compatriots hear him from Sassoun and arrive with Mher to avenge him and wipe out Akhlat. Khandout learns of David's death and commits suicide, and she is buried with him and his illegitimate daughter.

=== Cycle 4 ===
Pokr Mher and his Georgian wife go to Artsakh, where he is king for 7 years. A letter from his uncle has him quickly depart without his wife for Sassoun to defend it against Kuz-Badin's grandsons. Mher Junior captures them and nails two on each side of the gates of the city. Vergo, who is Mher's regent, still refuses to allow him to be king. He wants to return to his wife, but his uncle Ohan's wife Sara delays him and tries to seduce him. He refuses and she claims to Ohan that Mher tried to rape her, so his uncle locks him out of his house. Rather than force his way, he returns weeping to Artsakh, where he finds his wife dead. He heads to Aleppo whereupon the way he meets 40 strongmen sons and grandsons of the King of the East on camels and joins them. Their sister has magical powers and banished them, taking the throne herself. They decided to return for Mher to dispose of her. Mher meets a woman who he realizes must be their sister in disguise, decapitates her with a slap, and the brothers rejoice and offer Mher the throne. He declines and they all decide to go to Baghdad together to see the tomb of Mher's ancestor Balthasar. The king of Baghdad shows him the tomb, which is in front of his palace. The king complains about his enemies and Mher offers to destroy his worst enemy, which turns out to be the demon Kup Dev, with his 40 pahlevans. Mher went and fought him for 3 hours before striking off his head. As he was about to wipe out the pahlevans, they all got naked and he realized they were women. He took the women and the severed head to the King of Baghdad who offered Mher his throne. Mher refused and asked instead for a church to be built so that the 40 sons and grandsons from the east could marry these 40 women. It was done. Mher then refused the princess of Baghdad in marriage and left with the 80 newlyweds. Mher then goes to King Pajik, who offers to have him marry his daughter Gohar Katun, which after passing a few tests of worthiness, he does. Gohar refuses to sleep with Mher, unless he destroys another enemy, which he does. But the father's curse is being fulfilled. Mher remains childless.

The King of Aleppo, jealous that Mher married Gohar, has one of the regents of Sassoun's sons sent to fight Mher, who at first refuses to fight his kinsman, but is forced to by Gohar. Gohar sees the fight is too close, bares her chest to the regent's son, and when he stares, Mher kills him. Mher upset with Gohar leaves for 7 years, slaughtering heathens and destroying their temples. He returns to find Gohar dead and he buries her in Sassoun.

For a long time, Little Mher wandered in the Sasna Mountains with his faithful friend, the fiery Kurkik Jalali. The curse has made him a deathless wanderer in a world where the ground can no longer sustain him or his horse. Now Mher wants to die, and fights God's angels in order to be able to. He visits the tombs of his ancestors and prays for them to listen to his plea. He finally splits Raven's Rock in half, enters the cave inside it and it shuts on him and Kurkik. Mher is imprisoned forever inside the mountain. He awaits the moment when the world is cleansed of its iniquity and he can take his place as the rightful heir of Sassoun: "As long as lies reign in the world, I will not be able to get out of here. When the earth is torn apart and rebuilt, the grain of barley will be the size of a walnut, and the grain of wheat the size of a rose, I will be allowed to come out of the rock".

No one had seen him since that day. But they say that water comes out of Agravakar on Vardavar (Feast of the Ascension). It is Kurkik Jalalik, hitting with his hooves, he makes the water come out of the ground.

== Films ==
In 2010, an animated film was produced called Sasna Tsrer, directed by Arman Manaryan, covering the first three cycles of Daredevils of Sassoun. The 80-minute animated film took 8 years to create.

== Music ==
In 2005, Russian-Canadian composer Airat Ichmouratov composed the symphonic poem David of Sassoun, inspired by a book by Nairi Zarian, the renowned 20th-century Armenian poet, who in 1966 rendered this Armenian folk epic into simple prose for the enjoyment of children and adults alike. The symphonic poem was performed in Russia, Canada, and Armenia.

== See also ==
- Armenian literature
- Digenes Akritas
- National epic
- 2016 Yerevan hostage crisis; the hostage-takers referred to themselves as Sasna tsrrer
