= Garegin Srvandztiants =

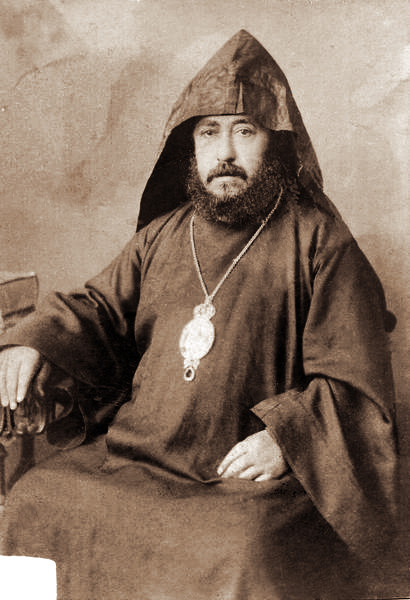
Garegin Srvandztiants

Garegin or Karekin Srvandztiants (Armenian: Գարեգին Սրուանձտեանց or Սրուանձտեան; November 17, 1840 – November 17, 1892) was an Armenian philologist, folklorist, ethnographer, and ecclesiastic.

== Life ==
Karekin Srvandztiants was born in Van in the Ottoman Empire in 1840. He was the uncle of military commander Hamazasp Srvandztyan. Srvandztiants was educated at the seminary of Varagavank monastery under the mentorship of Mkrtich Khrimian, well-known Armenian religious figure. Under his tutelage, Srvandztiants toured Eastern Armenia (also known as Russian Armenia) where he surveyed the living condition and cultural characteristics of the local population. In 1862 he moved with Khrimian to the St. Karapet Monastery near Mush, where he edited the journal Artsvik Tarono (The Eaglet of Taron). Srvandztiants was ordained a celibate priest in 1864 in the city of Erzurum (known to the Armenians as Karin). In 1866, two years after being ordained, Srvandztiants moved to Constantinople where he continued to be a priest and a community figure. A year later, he moved back to Erzurum where he supervised Armenian schools in the area. Thereafter, Srvandztiants was entrusted with the task of carrying out the reforms of the newly drafted Armenian National Constitution. He was made the head of St. Karapet Monastery where he would serve for several years. After the Russo-Turkish War (1877–78), the rights of Armenians were guaranteed under Article 16 of the Treaty of San Stefano, stipulating that the Russian forces occupying the Armenian-populated provinces in the eastern Ottoman Empire would withdraw only with the full implementation of reforms. Srvandztiants was then tasked to collect data and information of the Armenian population in the eastern provinces and report to the Patriarch of Constantinople. Meanwhile, however, Srvandztiants also documented many Armenian oral histories and collected many examples of epic folklore which had been passed down orally for generations.

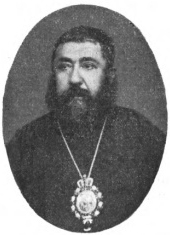
Srvandztiants' photograph as published in Teotig's Amenun Taretsyotse (Everyone's Almanac).

In 1886 Srvandztiants went to Ejmiatsin, where he was consecrated bishop and sent to Trabzon as prelate. Under suspicion of nationalist sympathies, Srvandztiants was closely monitored by the Ottoman government. He was then sent to Istanbul, where he would be monitored more easily. He taught at the Getronagan School and became a priest at the Holy Trinity Church located in the Beyoğlu district. Srvandztiants was honored by the Imperial Academy of St. Petersburg.

== Literary work ==
In 1874 Srvandztiants was the first person to publish and thus bring to light a version of the Armenian national epic Daredevils of Sasun. The epic was told by a villager from Mush who recounted the story in three days. He also published other ethnographic books.

Srvandztiants believed that Armenians can only overcome the difficulties of life through unity. This was exemplified when he wrote in 1869: "If the Armenians of Mush were true Armenians and true human beings, why would they let the Kurd loot their houses and belongings, snatch their earnings, and defile their honor? They are slaughtered constantly. They are dying. Let them at least do something and give meaning to their life and death."
