= Dasht, Armenia =

Village in Armavir, Armenia

Dasht Դաշտ
- Location within Armenia
- Coordinates: 40°13′41″N 44°18′04″E
- Country: Armenia
- Marz (Province): Armavir
- Founded: 1926

Population (2011)
  - Total: 780
- Time zone: UTC+4 ( )
  - Summer (DST): UTC+5 ( )

Dasht (Armenian: Դաշտ, meaning "field") is a village in the Armavir Province of Armenia. Just outside the town is a 1st millennium BCE fortress.

== History ==
The village was founded in 1926 in the Oshakan village and had the name Little Oshakan. Around the village are the ruins of the Cyclopean fortress called "Ardar David" by the locals, it was constructed around BC. 2-1 millennium.

== Geography ==
The village is located in the Middle-Araksian plain, at a height of 945 m above sea level. The climate is dry and very dry. Winters begin in mid-December, the average January temperature ranges from -3 to -5 °C.

Summer is long, from May to October, the average monthly air temperature reaches 24 to 26 °C, and the maximum reaches 42 °C. Often there are niches that cause significant damage to agriculture. The amount of annual atmospheric precipitation is 250-300 mm.

Natural landscapes are semi-deserts, which during irrigation have been transformed into cultural-irrigable landscape. From the agro-climatic point of view, the community lies in the absolute irrigation zone. It is rich in artesian waters, which are used as drinking water.

== Economy ==
The village has 349 existing households. It has a school, a library, a medical center, and a communication hub. The agricultural plots are irrigated with the waters of the Armavir canal. Arable land (79 ha), orchards (19 ha) and vineyards (12 ha) have a large share of agricultural land. State lands are mainly used as pastures, amounting to 45 ha. They are engaged in fruit growing, vegetable growing, horticulture, poultry breeding, and cattle breeding.

== Community based issues ==
Among the problems of the community, the main one is the issue of irrigation water and the issue of irrigation, drinking water water lines, the repair of inter-village roads, and the issue of school construction. The sale of agricultural products is also emphasized.

== See also ==
- Armavir Province
