= Anaqut =

Village and municipality in Ordubad, Nakhchivan, Azerbaijan

- Municipality
- Location within Azerbaijan
- Coordinates: 38°58′53″N 45°57′51″E
- Country: Azerbaijan
- Autonomous republic: Nakhchivan
- District: Ordubad

Population (2005)
  - Total: 428
- Time zone: UTC+4 (AZT)

Anaqut (also, Anagyut, until 2003, Danaqırt, and Danagyrt) is a village and municipality in the Ordubad District of Nakhchivan, Azerbaijan. It is located in the near of the Ordubad-Unus highway, 26 km away from the district center. The Venend river flows through center of the village. Its population mainly is busy with gardening, vegetable-growing and animal husbandry. There are club, library and a medical center in the village. It has a population of 428.

== Monuments ==
There was an Armenian church in the village - St. Astvatsatsin Church. It was still standing in the 1980s and had been destroyed by February 2000.

== See also ==
- St. Astvatsatsin Church (Anaqut)
