= Manuk Abeghyan =

Armenian academic

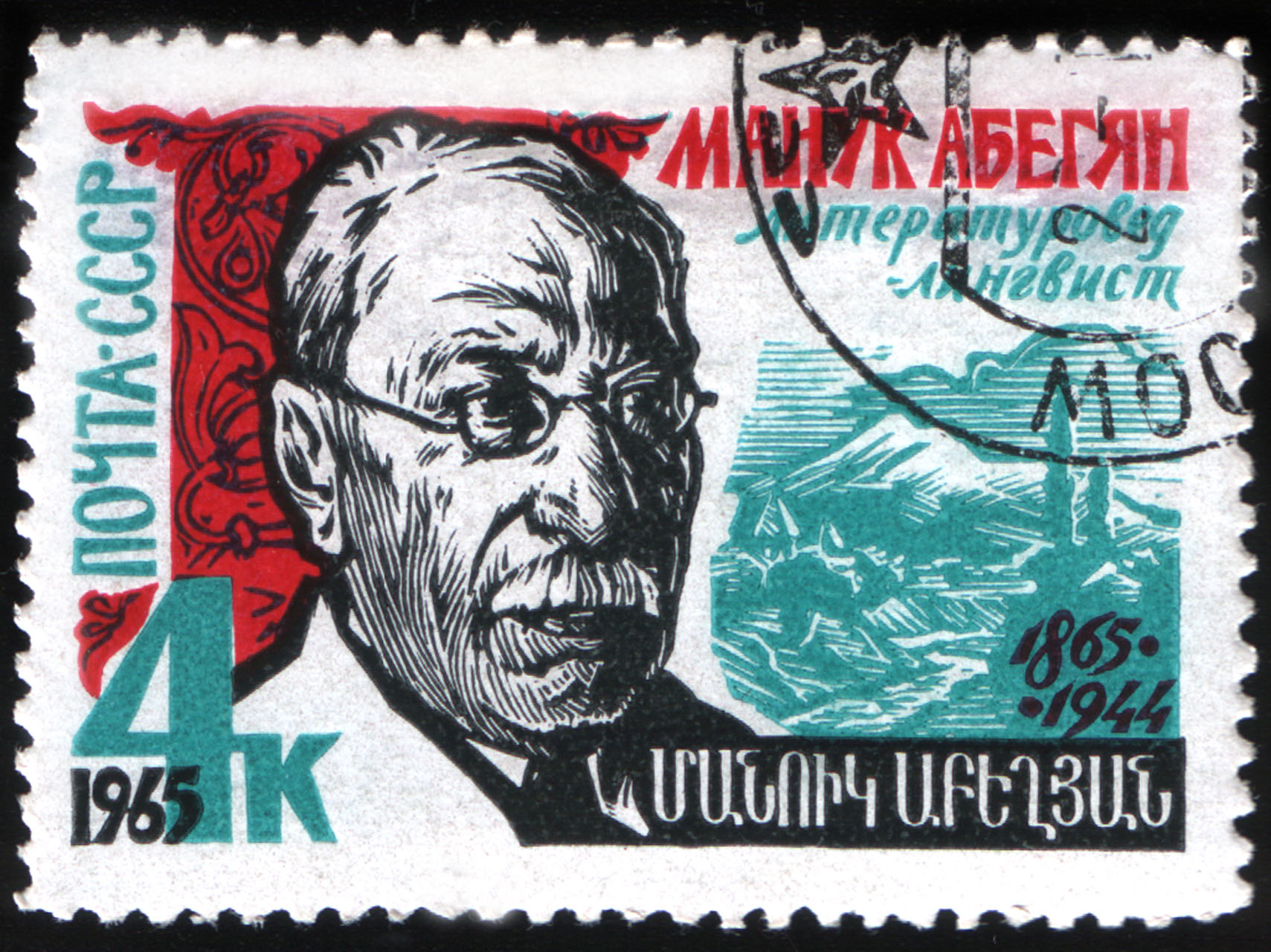
1965 Soviet postage stamp featuring Abeghyan on the 100th anniversary of his birth

Manuk Khachaturi Abeghyan (Armenian: Մանուկ Խաչատուրի Աբեղյան, Armenian pronunciation: [mɑˈnuk ɑbɛʁˈjɑn], alternatively Manouk Abeghian or Manuk Abeghian, 17 March [O.S. 5 March] 1865 – 26 September 1944) was an Armenian philologist, literary scholar, folklorist, lexicographer and linguist. He authored numerous scholarly works, including a comprehensive two-volume history of old Armenian literature titled Hayots’ hin grakanut’yan patmut’yun (1944–1946), and a volume on Armenian folklore, the German version of which is titled Der armenische Volksglaube. He worked extensively on the compilation and study of the Armenian national epic Daredevils of Sassoun. He is also remembered as the main designer of the reformed Armenian orthography used in Armenia to this day. He was one of the first professors of Yerevan State University and was a founding member of the Armenian National Academy of Sciences. The Institute of Literature of the National Academy of Sciences of Armenia is named in his honor.

== Early life ==
Manuk Abeghyan was born on 17 March [O.S. 5 March] 1865 in the village of Tazakand (modern-day Babak, Azerbaijan) in the Nakhichevan uezd of the Erivan Governorate of the Russian Empire. According to Hrachia Acharian, Abeghyan's original surname was Aghbeghian, which he later changed to the more Armenian-sounding Abeghyan. He attended a newly founded local school for about half a year, immediately showing great talent as a student. In 1876, the young Abeghyan was sent to study at the Gevorgian Seminary in Etchmiadzin. He graduated from the seminary in 1885 with highest honors.

== Early career and education ==
In 1887, Abeghyan was appointed teacher of Armenian language and literature at the Armenian diocesan school in Shushi, where he worked for two years. While in Shushi, he formed a literary circle with a few teachers at the diocesan school. In 1888, he presented to the public his new compilation of the Armenian epic Daredevils of Sassoun. That same year, he published a collection of poems titled Nmushner (Samples), which was received poorly and after which Abeghyan decided to abandon writing poetry. In 1889, he published his compilation of the Armenian national epic under the title Davit’ yev Mher (David and Mher), which he had compiled in 1886 at the Gevorgian Seminary based on the telling of the seminary's janitor, who was from Moxoene in Ottoman Armenia. Abeghyan's work was received well by scholars and was the second compilation of Daredevils of Sassoun since Garegin Srvandztiants had first recorded it, further establishing the fact that it was not merely a local or regional tradition of the Armenians of Taron, but rather a genuine Armenian national epic. Also in 1889, he published his first scholarly study in the monthly Murch (Hammer), on the topic of the Armenian national epic.

Abeghyan was then invited to Tiflis (Tbilisi) to work as the teacher of Armenian language and literature at the Tiflis Hovnanian Girls' Academy. After moving to Tiflis, Abeghyan frequently wrote for the Armenian newspaper Nor-dar (New century), sometimes using pseudonyms. His articles included reviews of books and plays and dealt with the contemporary issues of Armenian language, literature and theater. In 1891–1892, Abeghyan was the chief editor and publisher of Nor-dar, working closely with writers Nar-Dos and Muratsan. In 1889, he was elected head of the Tiflis commission for the publication of Armenian books. Around this time, he translated into Armenian a number of works by European and Russian authors, most notably Nikolai Gogol's Taras Bulba.

Abeghyan desired to continue his work on Armenian folklore and literature using the most advanced scholarly methods of the time, and for this purpose he sought to acquire a higher education at a European university. In 1893, with the financial support of the oil magnate Alexander Mantashev, he left for Germany to continue his studies. He spent two semesters at the University of Jena, three at Leipzig University, and three at the University of Berlin. At the German universities, he studied philology, history, language and literature. In 1895, Abeghyan left German for Paris and attended courses of the Faculty of Philology of Sorbonne University as an auditor, focusing mainly on literature and literary theory.

In 1898, Abeghyan successfully defended his doctoral dissertation titled "Der armenische Volksglaube" (Armenian folk belief) at the University of Jena, examined by classicist and Armenologist Heinrich Gelzer. His dissertation was published under the same title in 1899.

== Career ==
Abeghyan returned to Tiflis in 1898 and was immediately invited to teach at the Gevorgian Seminary, which he accepted. In 1898, he completed the voluminous work Hay zhoghovurdi ar’aspelnerë Movses Khorenats’u Hayots’ Patmut’yan mej (Legends of the Armenian people in Movses Khorenatsi's History of Armenia), which was directed against the arguments made by Grigor Khalatiants about Movses Khorenatsi's History of Armenia. Abeghyan began cooperating with Komitas on the compilation of Armenian songs and published two collections of fifty songs each; another set of fifty songs remained unpublished.

Starting in 1906, Abeghyan began publishing a series of articles titled "Hay zhoghovrdakan vepë" (The Armenian folk epic) in the journal Azgagrakan handes (Ethnographical journal), continuing his study of the epic Daredevils of Sassoun on the basis of fifteen versions of it. In 1906, Abeghyan completed his influential grammar of modern Armenian titled Ashkharhabari k’erakanut’yun. In 1907, he wrote a grammar of Classical Armenian, which later served as the basis for his two-part textbook of Classical Armenian, published in Tiflis in 1915–16. Abeghyan's Armenian textbooks were widely used in the Armenian schools of the time. In 1913, a critical edition of Khorenatsi's History of Armenia, which Abeghyan and Set Harutyunyan had been preparing since 1901, was published in Tiflis. In June 1914, Abeghyan resigned from his positions at the Gevorgian Seminary and moved again to Tiflis. He became the teacher of Classical Armenian and old Armenian literature at the Nersisian School. He gave public lectures on old Armenian literature, folklore and epics. He also taught at the newly established Armenian State Gymnasium in 1917.

In 1918, preparations began in Tiflis for the foundation of a university in Yerevan for the newly independent Republic of Armenia. Abeghyan was appointed a member of the organizing committee, and the following year he was invited to Yerevan to teach at the newly opened university. On 1 August 1919, he was appointed a professor and dean of the Faculty of History of Yerevan University. At the request of the Union of Armenian Lawyers and Tiflis, Abeghyan, Stepan Malkhasyants and a group of lawyers prepared a Russian-Armenian legal dictionary, the first of its kind, which was published in 1919. A year later, Abeghyan was invited to work in the Ministry of Justice of Armenia to further develop Armenian legal language. In June 1920, Abeghyan took up the position of head of training courses for military officers. After this, Abeghyan and a group of military specialists were tasked by the Armenian ministry of defense with developing military terminology in Armenian. Abeghyan continued this work after Armenia became a Soviet republic, compiling a Russian-Armenian and Armenian-Russian dictionary of military terms and overseeing the editing of military books and records.

=== Spelling reform ===
Abeghyan was a leading figure in the reform of Armenia orthography which was carried out in Soviet Armenia. Abeghyan had advocated for spelling reform earlier, having given a lecture about its necessity in Etchmiadzin in 1913. The goal of the spelling reform was to bring Armenian orthography up to date with the pronunciation of the modern language. He was tasked with developing the new Armenian orthography by the Soviet Armenian ministry of education. He outlined his suggestions in a public lecture in Yerevan in 1921, proposing to carry out the spelling reform gradually over the course of several decades. Instead, the reform of Armenian spelling was implemented immediately, provoking criticism from part of the Armenian intelligentsia both in Armenia and in the diaspora. Abeghyan defended the new spelling against its critics in two books. In 1940, the final round of spelling reform was implemented based on Abeghyan's proposals from 1921, establishing the orthography that is used in Armenia to this day.

=== Career in Soviet Armenia ===
In 1921, Abeghyan was elected a member of the Armenian Relief Committee, aimed at improving the humanitarian situation in Armenia. Abeghyan continued his teaching activities at Yerevan University, lecturing on Armenian folklore, old Armenian literature and the Armenian language. He became associated professor in 1921 and full professor in 1926. In 1923–1925, he served as dean of the historical and literary faculty of the university. In 1925, the first research institution of Soviet Armenia, the Institute of Science and Art, was founded. Abeghyan was elected its vice-president. He continued his research activities while holding these administrative and teaching positions. In 1931, he published a new version of the book Hayots’ lezvi tesut’yun (Theory of the Armenian language) and the monograph Hin gusanakan zhoghovrdakan yerger (Old bardic folk songs). He was elected a member of the Central Executive Committee of Armenia in 1925, 1927, and 1929 and was elected to the Transcaucasian SFSR Central Executive Committee in 1929, and before that, in 1927, a member of the Yerevan City Council. In 1930, he was suddenly dismissed from the position of the president of the Institute of Science and Art. He then became a member of the presidium of the Institute of History and Literature. In 1932, he was elected chairman of the commission for the correction and creation of place names of the Armenian SSR, which had the task of replacing non-Armenian place names in the republic and adjusting others. In 1935, he was awarded with the title of Honored Scientist of the Armenian SSR and received the degree of Doctor of Social Sciences.

In 1931, due to an eye disease, Abeghyan retired from his teaching position at Yerevan University, but he continued his research. During this time, he focused on the completion and printing of his unfinished works. In 1933, he published the study Hayots’ lezvi taghach’ap’ut’yun (Metrics of the Armenian language). He particularly focused on the Armenian national epic, agreeing to edit a critical edition of Daredevils of Sassoun together with Karapet Melik-Ohanjanyan. This edition was published in 1936. On August 22, 1939, at the jubilee session of the Armenian branch of the USSR Academy of Sciences dedicated to "Davit of Sassoon", he read a report, which was entirely devoted to the examination history of the writing, publication and study of the novel in Armenian philology. Abeghyan's report was published in Armenian and Russian under the title "Bibliography of the Armenian folk epic David of Sassoun."

=== Last years and death ===
Abeghyan's health deteriorated again in his later years. He refused several offers to return to teaching at the university. He dedicated his efforts to organizing the large collection of Armenian folklore and songs, which he undertook forty years before with Komitas and left half-finished. In 1940, he published a large collection of Armenian folk songs called khaghiks and a collection of medieval urban lyrical songs. In the spring of 1940, despite his poor health, he began work on the a critical edition of Koriun's Life of Mashtots on the occasion of the 1500th anniversary of the death of Mesrop Mashtots, the inventor of the Armenian alphabet. The edition was published in 1941 with Abeghyan's translation into modern Armenian, preface and notes. One of Abeghyan's last major works was Hayots’ hin grakanut’yan patmut’yun (History of ancient Armenian literature), which covered Armenian folklore and literature from its origins up to the 10th century. After completing the first volume, he moved on to work on the second volume covering the period up to the 14th century. This was published in 1946 after his death. Abeghyan died on 26 September 1944 in Yerevan. He is buried at Tokhmakh cemetery in Yerevan.

== Family ==
Abeghyan had two sons: Mher Abeghyan, who was a painter, and Suren Abeghyan, who was an actor and playwright. Abeghyan's nephew, Artashes Abeghyan, was also a philologist.

== Sources ==
- Acharian, Hrachia (1962). "Hay azgayin anunner" Հայ ազգային անուններ [Armenian national names]. Hayotsʻ andznanunneri baṛaran Հայոց անձնանունների բառարան [Dictionary of Armenian given names] (in Armenian). Vol. V. Yerevan: Petakan hamalsarani hratarakchʻutʻyun. p. 360.
- Harutyunyan, S.; Margaryan, A. (1975). "Abeghyan Manuk" Աբեղյան Մանուկ. In Hambardzumyan, Viktor (ed.). Haykakan sovetakan hanragitaran Հայկական սովետական հանրագիտարան [Armenian Soviet Encyclopedia] (in Armenian). Vol. 1. Yerevan: Armenian Encyclopedia Publishing House. pp. 22–23.
- Harutyunyan, Sargis; Poghosyan, Anna (2015). "Manuk Abeghyan. kensamatenagitakan aknark ev matenagitutʻyun (tsnndyan 150-amyaki aṛtʻiv" Մանուկ Աբեղյան. կենսամատենագիտական ակնարկ և մատենագիտություն (ծննդյան 150-ամյակի առթիվ) [Manouk Abeghian. Bio-Bibliographical Essay and Bibliography (to the 150th birth anniversary)]. Patma-Banasirakan Handes (in Armenian) (1): 92–127.
