= David of Sassoun (statue) =

Copper equestrian statue in Yerevan, Armenia

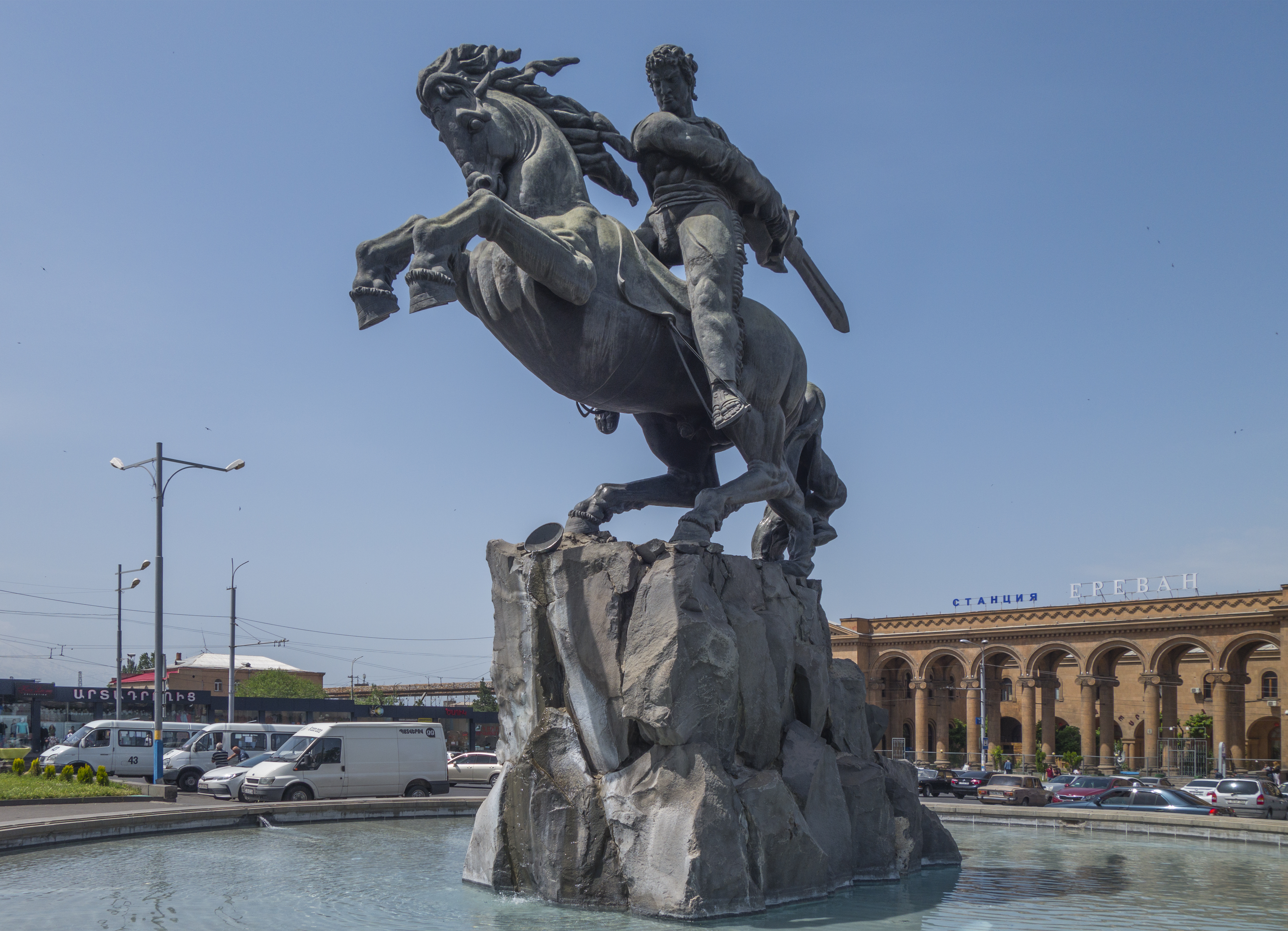
- Interactive map of David of Sassoun
- Location: David of Sassoun Square, (Note: It was formerly known as Կայարանամերձ հրապարակ, Kayaranamerdz hraparak, literally meaning "Station Square".) Erebuni District, Yerevan, Armenia
- Coordinates: 40°09′19″N 44°30′34″E
- Designer: Yervand Kochar
- Material: Copper (sculpture); Basalt (base)
- Height: sculpture: 6.5 m (21 ft) base: 5 m (16 ft) total: 11.5 m (38 ft)
- Weight: 3.5 t (7,700 lb)
- Opening date: December 3, 1959
- Dedicated to: David of Sassoun

David of Sassoun (Note: There is no universally accepted spelling of the place name. It has traditionally been spelled Sassoun in English, but other variants frequently appear, including Sasun, Sasoun, Sasoon, and Sassoon. His name is sometimes rendered as Davit, reflecting the Armenian form of the name.) (Armenian: «Սասունցի Դավիթ») is a copper equestrian statue portraying David of Sassoun (Sasuntsi Davit’) in Yerevan, Armenia. Erected by the sculptor and artist Yervand Kochar in 1959, it depicts the protagonist of the Armenian national epic Daredevils of Sassoun. It is placed on a basalt base shaped to resemble natural rock formations. The statue stands at the center of a round reflecting pool in a large square in front of Yerevan's central railway station.

The first version of the statue was originally erected in 1939 for the thousandth anniversary of the epic, but two years later, the statue was destroyed and Kochar was arrested. Since its erection, the statue has been widely admired and has become a symbol of Yerevan. Following a decline in arrivals to the city via train, there have been frequent calls to relocate the statue to Yerevan's Republic Square. It is designated as a national monument by the Armenian government.

== History ==
=== Background and first statue ===
The David of Sassoun statue was first conceived prior to the 1000th-anniversary celebrations of the epic in Soviet Armenia in 1939. Yervand Kochar, who in 1936 became the most prominent artist to move to Soviet Armenia from abroad, was commissioned to produce the sculpture. Kochar made it of gypsum and reportedly finished it on site in 18 days working directly in plaster at the installation site. Other sources state he spent up to three months on the project. In the same year, he created six illustrations for David Sasunskiy, the Russian-language academic publication of the epic. Kochar's statue was unveiled in mid-September 1939 in the square in front of the Yerevan Railway Station. It was positioned there so as to greet city visitors, the majority of whom during this period arrived by train. The 3 m-tall (9.8 ft) sculpture stood on a 7 m-tall (23 ft) rectangular pedestal. It was the first equestrian monument erected in modern Armenia. The sculpture incorporated both Renaissance and socialist realist elements. Art critic M. Sargissian later commended its "high artistic value", calling it a "significant step toward realistic sculpture."

The statue was destroyed days after Kochar was arrested on June 23, 1941 for "anti-Soviet agitation", and only survives in photographs. Kochar was released in August 1943, through the intervention of his former Nersisian School classmates Anastas Mikoyan and Karo Halabyan.

=== Current statue ===
In 1957, on the 40th anniversary of the October Revolution, Soviet authorities decided to restore the statue. Kochar began working on the new statue at a large pavilion at Yerevan's Central Cemetery (Tokhmakh) no later than August 1957. It was completed within the same year. He recreated it with significant changes from the initial version, which had included an old Arab man besides David. It is more ambitious in scale that the first version. The artistic council was highly critical, complaining about the proportions between David and his horse Kurkik and the size of details. Kochar explained that the details were inspired by specific lines from the epic.

The current restored statue was inaugurated on December 3, 1959. The opening ceremony attracted a large crowd despite the cold weather, including many Armenians hailing from Sasun. Many came with carpets and wine, turning it into a spontaneous celebration that lasted until late night. The opening ceremony was officiated by Yerevan Mayor Gurgen Pahlevanian; no senior officials from the local Communist Party attended. (Note: The local Communist newspaper said "leading party and Soviet workers" attended it without providing names.) It featured several speakers, including the literary scholar and writer Gevorg Abov, the sculptor Grigor Aharonian, a factory lathe operator, and a ninth grade student. The actor Zhan Eloyan recited an excerpt from the epic, which inflamed the crowd's emotions. The literary scholar Yakov Khachikian, who witnessed its opening, said there was much enthusiasm and jubilation among the crowd.

According to Khachikian, Kochar had long conceived the idea of the statue, which he only realized with the support of the Soviet state. On the other hand, the Russian literary scholar Lev Ospovat quoted Kochar, whose artistic style was more abstract and enigmatic, as saying that he created the statue to gain recognition, rather than as an expression of his personal creativity. The classically-inspired statue disappointed artists who admired Kochar's experimental Parisian work.

=== Historical context and influence ===
The statue was erected during a period of an Armenian nationalist resurgence amid the Khrushchev Thaw. The anthropologist Adam T. Smith argued that David, along with the contemporary statue of Mesrop Mashtots (1962) in front of the Matenadaran, "commemorates the achievements of a specifically national hero—a hero of Armenia, not Soviet Armenia", while earlier statues in Yerevan commemorated Soviet and Bolshevik leaders. Taline Ter Minassian suggested that it highlights the "exact limits of national expression in the post-Stalinist era." The art critic Hrach Bayadyan noted that the statue, along with the genocide memorial erected in 1965–67, "played a principal role in the symbolic construction of Soviet (Eastern) Armenian identity, connoting the nation's tragedy and rebirth, as well as its longevity and struggle against foreign rule."

The art historian Nona Stepanian argued that its small pedestal set a new trend in statues in Yerevan in which they no longer towered over people and streets with their formidable height. It also inspired the creation of statues of other legendary or mythological figures, such as Hayk and Vahagn by Karlen Nurijanyan.

=== Restoration ===
After the collapse of the Soviet Union and the ensuing economic crisis, the statue deteriorated, and the sculpture reportedly began to sway in strong winds. (Note: A 2006 photo shows graffiti on the statue.) The "cup of patience" at the horse's feet was repeatedly stolen. In 2011, the statue underwent extensive restoration, including the installation of nighttime lighting, funded by Ruben Vardanyan and others. The pool surrounding the statue and its water supply were also restored. However, several sculptors stated the following year that the statue required further restoration.

== Description and symbolism ==
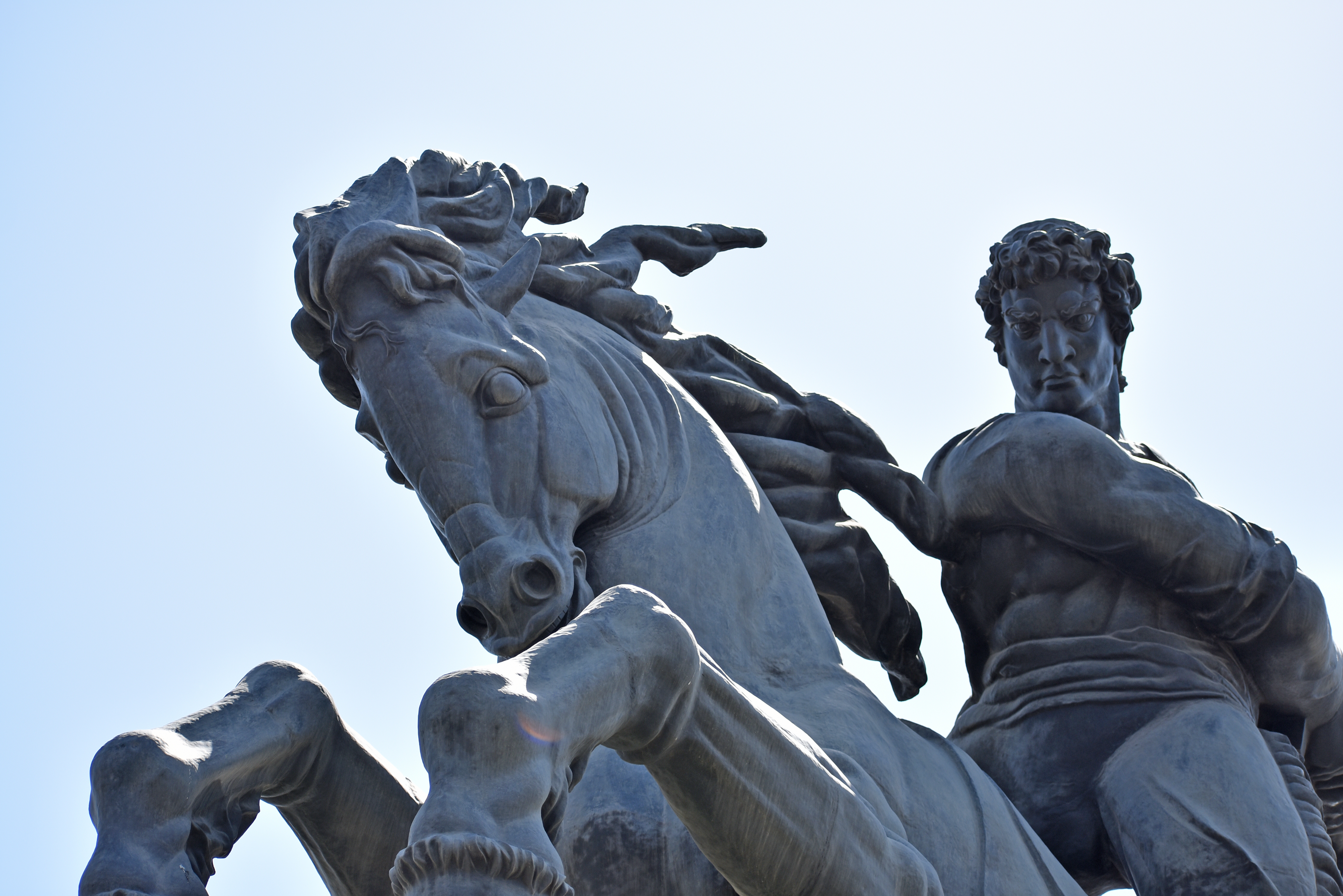
A closeup view of David and his "fiery colt"

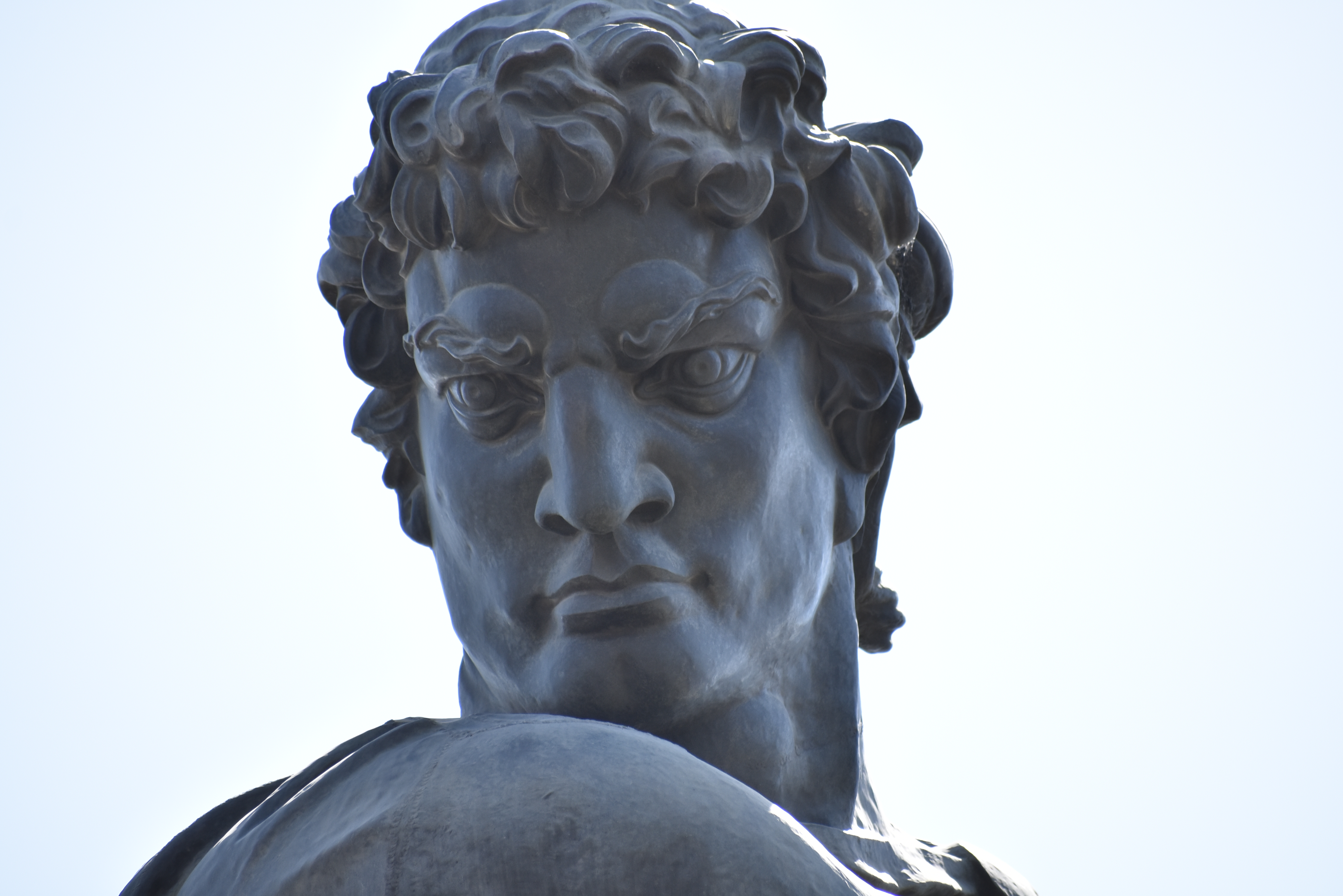
A closeup of David's face

The sculpture is made of wrought copper, (Note: Some sources incorrectly say bronze.) measures 6.5 m (21 ft) tall, 9.3 m (31 ft) long and 2.2 m (7 ft 3 in) wide, and weighs 3.5 tonnes (7,700 lb). David, with a heavily muscled physique, is mounted on his legendary horse K’urkik Jalali ("fiery colt") and wields his t’ur ketsaki ("lightning sword").

David's face was modelled after dancer Vanoush Khanamirian, who in the 1950s portrayed David in the ballet Khandut inspired by the epic. David has a stern head posture with a menacing and calm face. The literary scholar Hrachia Grigorian noted that "righteous indignation" and "anger, but not malice" are expressed in his face. The art historian Ararat Aghasyan suggested that David's head resembles ancient gods and heroes and is "somewhat reminiscent" of Michelangelo's David.

David's pants contain cowboy-style chaps, modeled after traditional men's wear from Sasun. (Note: Kochar believed that natives of Sasun wore pants with fringes made from goat hair centuries ago and were later transported by Arab conquerors to North Africa, Spain, and then Latin America.) Kochar explained that the large size of the horse's tail, its lack of reins and bit, and its anthropomorphic and supernatural qualities were as narrated in the epic.

Simyan argues that although David is depicted in a battle scene against Msra Melik’ ("King of Egypt"), the lack of an enemy in the sculpture leaves an uninitiated viewer open to choosing an enemy of the Armenian people. He argues that the sculpture thus functions on a timeless level. Simyan suggests that Kochar's sculpture is independent of the epic. Earl R. Anderson argued that the statue "symbolizes traditional Armenian resistance to world-kingship as evil."

=== Base and pool ===
The statue stands on a 5 m (16 ft) tall base, bringing the total height to 11.5 m (38 ft). (Note: Kochar said in a 1959 interview that the statue is 6.5 m tall and the base is 5 m tall, totaling 11.5 m, but some sources indicate its total height as 12.5 m (41 ft).) It is supported by three points: the horse's two hind legs and the tail. Kochar explained that the proportion was deliberately chosen as raising the base would have disrupted the ensemble of the monument and the railway station. It is placed at the center of a round reflecting pool with a diameter of 25 m (82 ft). The base, made of large blocks of rough grey basalt, was designed by the architect Mikayel Mazmanian, although Kochar conceived the idea of a pedestal from natural rock. It is meant to reflect the landscape of Armenia, especially the rugged terrain of the Sasun region.

The water and the round shape of the pool from which David rises symbolize the idea of eternity. At the horse's feet, Kochar placed a bowl (or cup), from which water constantly flows, reflecting the naturalness of the pedestal. A transitional element between the statue and the pedestal, the bowl is also visualization of the Armenian expression "filling the bowl of patience" (Note: Armenian: համբերության բաժակը լցվել) and a free interpretation of the epic. Kochar likened the pool to a "sea of tears" of the Armenian people. Water, Kochar argued, is not a decorative element, but a necessary component to express the content of the epic. (Note: Volynsky compared the splash of the stream flowing from the bowl sounds like the voice of a narrator.)

== Reception ==
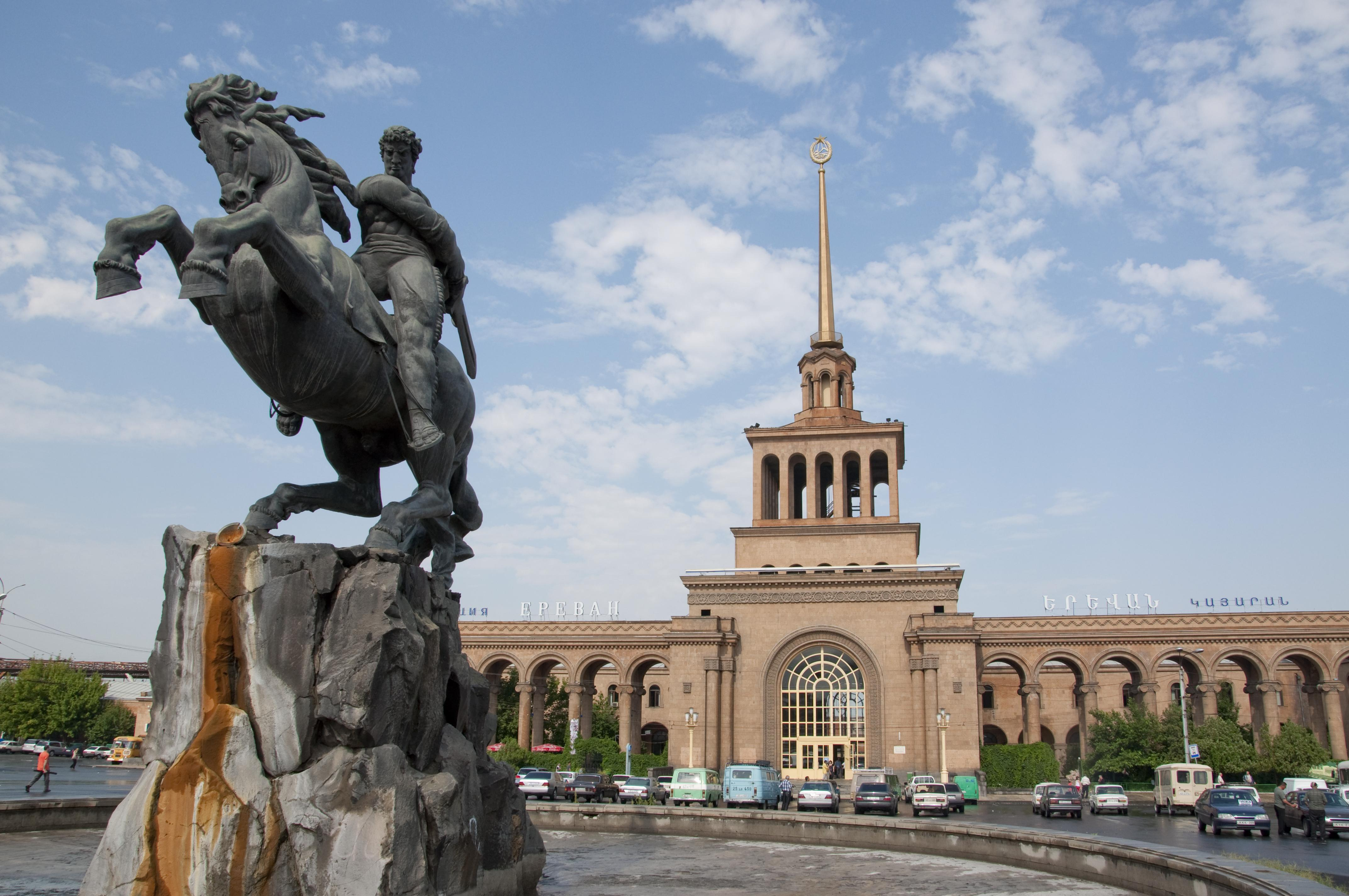
The statue with the train station

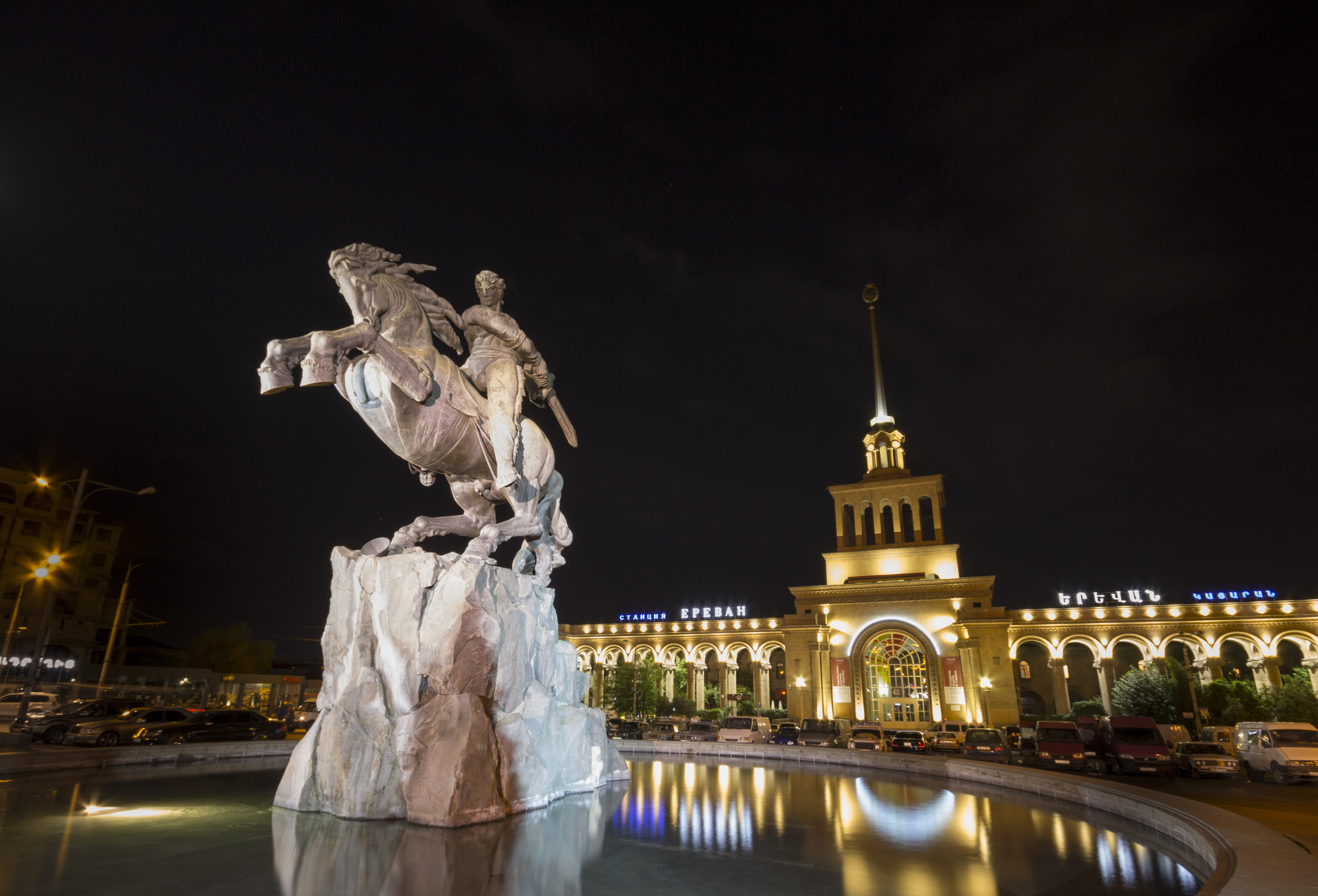
A night view

=== Official reaction ===
The statue, which earned Kochar a State Prize of the Armenian SSR in 1967, is widely considered his best-known and most important work. A local Communist Party magazine declared it Kochar's "great triumph", which once again came to prove the "invincible power of the great art of socialist realism." Weeks after it was unveiled, the statue had "received widespread public acceptance" by locals and guests alike. Taking photos with the statue has become a tradition for visitors. Described as Armenia's "most famous contemporary monument", it has acquired an iconic status. It become a symbol of Yerevan, a status it had officially achieved by the city's 2750th anniversary celebrations in 1968.

=== Critical reception ===
The statue has also been widely admired by visitors and critics and has often been called a masterpiece. (Note: It has been called a masterpiece, among others, by David Marshall Lang, Aleksandr Dymshits, Murad Hasratyan, Lado Gudiashvili, Yakov Khachikian.) Artists and scholars have broadly applauded its artistic merit. (Note: Visitors and critics have described it as "beautiful", "splendid", "beautiful and spirited", "splendid equestrian statue [...] will impress art lovers," "adorns the city", "very fine equestrian statue", "magnificent statue", "brilliantly and ingeniously handled".) The sculptor Lev Kerbel called it a "significant achievement" of Soviet visual arts. The writer and artist Leonid Volynsky described it as the "best equestrian statue erected in [the territory of the Soviet Union] in a century, and perhaps even more" and called it "full of expressiveness, of 'Michelangelesque' irregularities". The painter Jean Carzou remarked that such a fine equestrian statue had not been created in Europe in 300 years. The painter Lado Gudiashvili found it to be "the best work of contemporary sculpture". (Note: Armen Shekoyan opined that it is one of the world's finest equestrian statues. Literaturnaya Armenia, a magazine of the Writers Union of Armenia, wrote in 1977 that it is "considered by many to be the world's best equestrian sculpture of the past century." Gavrill Petrosyan, a Soviet Armenian author, wrote in 1981 that "experts reckon that this is the best equestrian statue of the past 100 years.") Art critic Nazareth Karoyan ranks it among the world's greatest equestrian statues, alongside those of Marcus Aurelius and Gattamelata.

The architects Artsvin Grigoryan and Martin Tovmasyan suggested that the sculpture is "remarkable for its expressive dynamism and stylistic balance" and "aligns harmoniously in style and artistic interpretation with the station's calm and monumental architecture." The novelist Vasily Grossman wrote that he was "struck by the power" of the "magnificent" statue, noting that it is "full of movement and strength."

Rouben Paul Adalian noted that the "dynamic and forceful" statue is "such a compelling work of sculpture that the image became an emblematic portrait" of Soviet Armenia. The scholar David Marshall Lang called it a "spirited masterpiece" and a "fitting symbol of Armenia's national renaissance, and her age long defiance of her foes." An American scientific delegation found it "remarkably powerful". (Note: Chairman of the U.S. Atomic Energy Commission Glenn T. Seaborg, leader of the delegation, wrote that the statue is "remarkable because, despite its large weight, it is supported at only two points." The statue is, however, supported at three, not two, points.) The scholar James R. Russell suggested that it is "perhaps the most widely-recognized emblem of Armenia" along with Mount Ararat. (Note: Similarly, Vartoug Basmadjian wrote that the statue "became, after Mount Ararat, the most powerful and popular symbol of Armenia.")

The writers Georgi Kublitsky and Zori Balayan both noted that the statue powerfully reflects the "Armenian spirit". The art critic Hernik Igityan argued that it is "not a monument to any individual or event, but to an entire nation" and "embodies the best qualities of the Armenian people." Igityan wrote that it is dear to the heart of Armenians as the Renaissance statues of Verrocchio and Donatello are to Italy or Falconet's Bronze Horseman (1782) is to Russia. The philosopher of art Yakov Khachikian called it an "unparalleled specimen" of Armenian sculpture, admired its richness in expression, dynamism, and power, and compared it favorably to the Bronze Horseman in Saint Petersburg. (Note: Zharkovskaya and Tyukin listed David of Sassoun, along with the Bronze Horseman (1782) and the Vakhtang Gorgasali (1967) in Tbilisi, all equestrian statues, as having become symbols of their host cities.) The literary scholar Aleksandr Dymshits wrote that David, along with Kochar's another Yerevan statue, that of Vardan Mamikonian, is "epically grand and at the same time full of drama, movement, impulse, and passion." The travel writer Nikolai Mikhailov admired how it captures impetuousness like nowhere else.

== Proposals to relocate ==
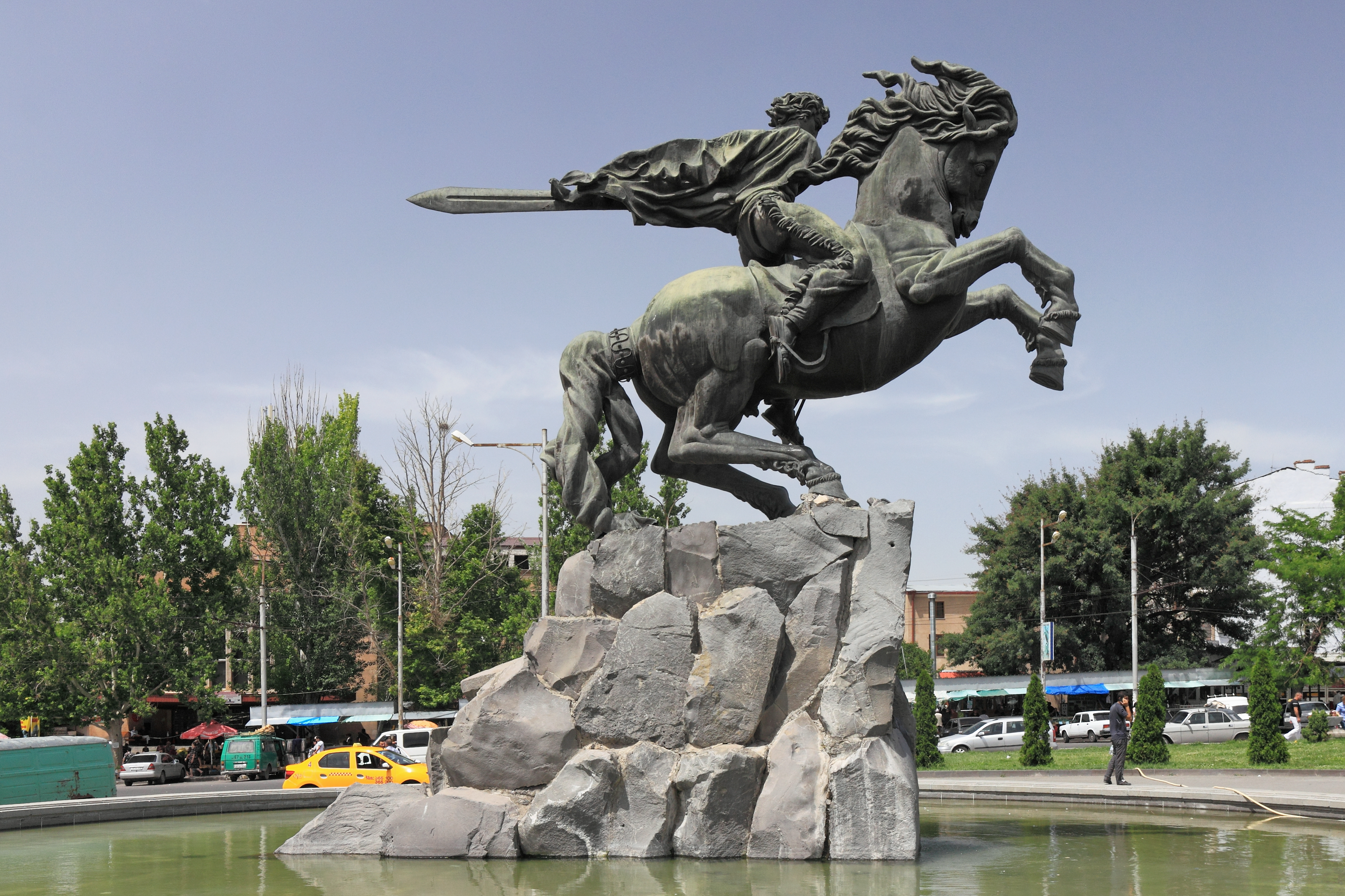
A side view

As early as 1998, Armen Shekoyan proposed moving the statue to Republic Square, where the statue of Vladimir Lenin stood before it was taken down in 1991. Shekoyan argued that it would fit well in Yerevan's central square and be more cost-effective than commissioning a new one. He emphasized that, unlike its current location, which had become an ordinary residential area due to the decline in train arrivals, the statue would become a focal point, visible to all visitors. He also claimed that Kochar had privately envisioned the statue in what was then Lenin Square. Kochar’s son, Haykaz, reportedly said that placing the statue in Republic Square had been his father’s dream. Supporters of the idea often argued that its current setting no longer fits its original and the statue no longer greets visitors.

When the proposal was made at a 2006 competition, Mkrtich Minasyan, the head of Armenia's Union of Architects, called the proposal reasonable, but opined that statue's proportions are small for the square and warned that it may be damaged while moving. One proponent, the architect Garri Rashidyan, wrote in his 2007 book that it may be the "best solution for replacing Lenin as the central and focal point of the most important square of our republic." In 2013, Diana Ter-Ghazaryan noted that David of Sassoun would be a safe choice because of the epic hero's fundamentally apolitical nature and his statue at Yerevan's central square would be acceptable to most Armenians, but considered the relocation unlikely.

== Cultural depictions ==
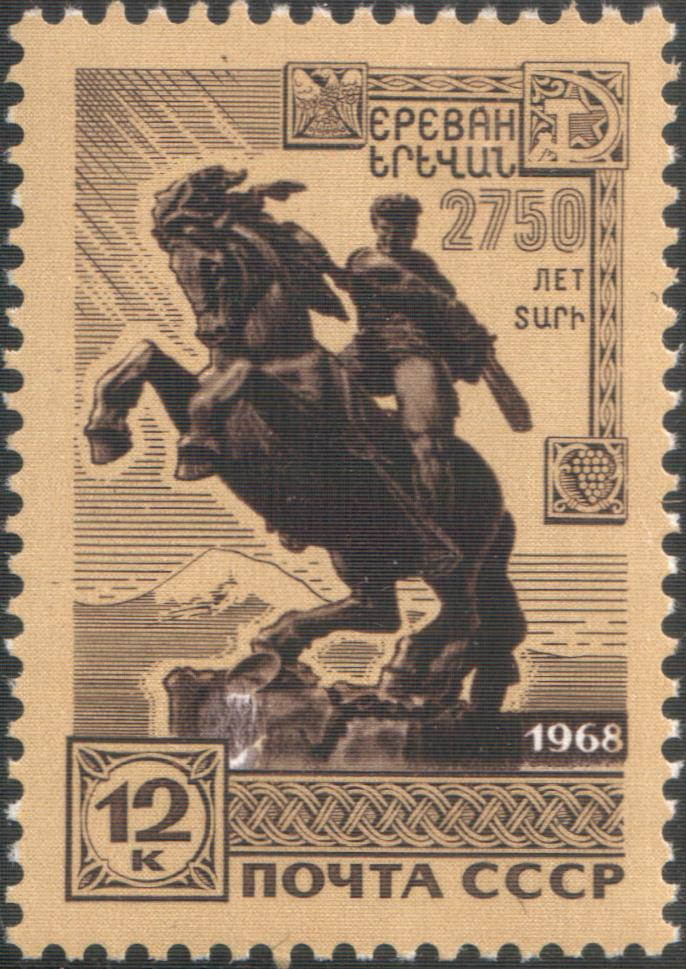
The statue on a 1968 Soviet stamp

- The film studio Hayfilm (formerly Armenfilm) uses the statue as its logo and trademark.
- It appears in a painting by Seda Gharagyozyan.

Stamps and currency

- It appeared on 1968 and 1990 Soviet stamps and a 1991 Soviet commemorative coin.
- The statue appeared on the obverse of 10 Armenian dram banknotes of the first series (1993–1998), an uncirculated 1994 silver commemorative coin, and a circulated 2012 commemorative 50 dram coin dedicated to Yerevan.
- A 2009 Armenian stamp commemorated its 50th anniversary.
- Yerevan Metro tokens depict the statue.

Film

- The statue is featured in the 1987 Soviet Armenian film The Road to Sasuntsi Davit.

Literature

- In his 1983 essay collection entitled Nor Hayastan, nor Hayer (New Armenia, New Armenians), Antranig Dzarugian writes that Armenian national symbols became real, in concrete and bronze, in Lenin's Armenia, including the statue of David of Sassoun.
- It is mentioned in the poem "Statues of Haig" by Diana Der Hovanessian included in the collection The Circle Dancers (1996).

== Bibliography ==
- Panossian, Razmik (2006). The Armenians: From Kings and Priests to Merchants and Commissars. New York: Columbia University Press. ISBN 9780231139267.
- Simyan, Tigran (2016). "Визуализация армянского эпоса в городском пространстве (на примере Ерванда Кочара) [Visualization of the Armenian epic in urban space (on the example of Yervand Kochar)]" (PDF). ΠΡΑΞΜΗΑ. Journal of Visual Semiotics (in Russian). 3 (9). Tomsk State Pedagogical University: 82–96. Archived from the original (PDF) on March 5, 2022.
- Aghasyan, Ararat [in Armenian] (1999). Ерванд Кочар [Yervand Kochar] (in Russian). Yerevan: Armenian Academy of Sciences. Archived from the original on December 6, 2023.
