= Dymshits =

Dymshits (Дымшиц) is an Ashkenazi Jewish surname originating in the Russian Empire. It is one of the transformations of the toponymic surname "Domashitskij/Domashitsky" (Russian: Домашицкий), from the place name Domashitsy, (now in Pinsk District, Belarus). Other variations include Dimsits, Demsitz, Dymshets, Dymshich, Domshits, Dymashits, Diemschutz.

Notable people with this name include:

- Aleksandr Dymshits, Soviet professor and military officer
- Mark Dymshits, part of the Dymshits–Kuznetsov hijacking affair
- Veniamin Dymshits, Soviet party leader
