= Ruben Kochar =

Armenian film director, writer, and painter

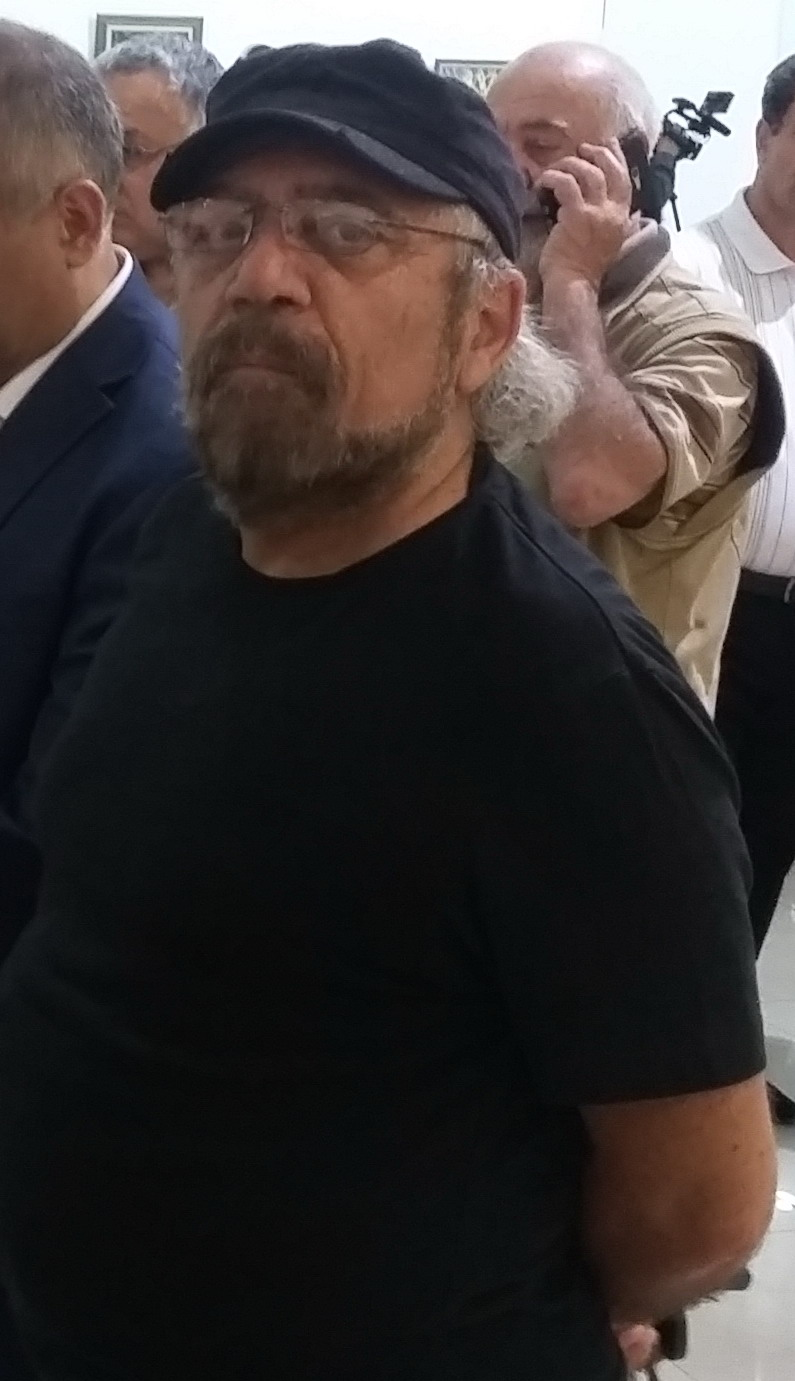
- Born: March 26, 1953; Yerevan, Armenian SSR
- Occupations: Film director, theatre director, writer, artist, producer
- Years active: 1975–present
- Spouse: Narine Kochar (m. 2010)
- Children: 2
- Parent(s): Yervand Kochar; Manik Mkrtchyan-Kochar

Ruben Kochar Armenian: Ռուբեն Երվանդի Քոչար (Born March 26, 1953 in Yerevan, Armenian SSR) is an Armenian film director, writer, producer and painter. He is an Honored Artist of Armenia.

== Early life ==
His father was artist and sculptor Yervand Kochar. Kochar became a free thinker during and after Soviet times, producing more than two dozen films: shorts, musicals, film ballets and features.

Kochar graduated from Armenian State Pedagogical University, department of film directing in 1974 and advanced courses of Film and Television majoring in musical film directing in Moscow in 1980.

== Career ==
Kochar started his career as a film director in the late 1970s at Armenfilm film studios. Later he moved to Yerevan Film Studios where he worked until 1995, creating 21 films, two of which became the studio's best films. In 1983, Kochar began to serve as a member of the Union of Filmmakers of Armenia. From the early 2000s his films have been co-produced by American film production companies Blue Lion Entertainment, Global Films Production, RK Films Production, Armenfilm, and National Cinema Center of Armenia.

In 1993, Kochar founded AITN (Armenian International Television Network) in US, ARPI daily cultural TV program airing in Los Angeles since 1992 and ARPI Video and Film Production in 1998.

In 2003 he founded Kochar Cultural Foundation, which aims to promote Armenian culture around the world, producing documentaries, organizing art exhibitions, screenings and various cultural events. In 2009 Kochar staged Son of Faith, a theatrical drama (by Armenian dramaturge Manuel Atamian), which premiered at Sundukyan State Academic Theatre in Yerevan, Armenia and later performed in Stepanakert, Artsakh, London, UK and other diaspora communities. In 2015 he was invited to Yerevan Opera Theatre as a stage director by the artistic director of the theatre at that period, world-famous tenor Gegham Grigoryan.

Kochar is also involved in writing and painting. He is the author of novels and screenplays.

=== Fine art ===
Kochar started painting in his early 30s, under the influence of his father, Maestro Yervand Kochar. He has exhibited in US, UK, Russia, Armenia. His work can be found in private collections around the world. In 2016 he sculptured the statue of Motherhood based on the sketch Yervand Kochar created in 1928 in his Parisian period. The monument was opened in September 2016, and is situated in front of Fertility Medical Center in Yerevan, Armenia, as a symbol of fertility and maternity.

== Recognition ==
In 1985 he was awarded the Laureate of the Lenin Komsomol Prize for innovation style of film ballet series: Lilith, Memoirs, Hello Out There. His further awards include:

- Best Director Award at Arpa International Film Festival (Los Angeles, 2013) for My Name Is Viola (2013),
- President's Award at Ajijik International Film Festival (Mexico, 2001) for Herostratus (2001),
- Medal of Arsenal International Film Festival (Latvia, 1988) for the film ballet Lilith (1986), and
- Grand Prix of Minsk Film Festival (Belarus, 1985) for Quartet (1985).

== Personal life ==
Kochar lives and works in Armenia and the US. He married producer and actress Narine Kochar, who debuted with Ruben Kochar in Arahet in 2003. Their daughter Lily Mano Kochar was born in 2013.

== Filmography ==
Film
Year	Title	Genre	Notes
2018	Auto-portrait	Film	
2018	Opera-85	Documentary	Dedicated to 85th anniversary of Yerevan Opera Theatre
2016	The Bard	Documentary	Dedicated to Armenian musician Tovmas Poghosyan
2015	House of Avet Terterian	Documentary	Dedicated to composer Avet Terterian
2015	Friends of Armenians	Documentary	Dedicated to Armenian genocide Centennial
2013	My Name Is Viola	Film	
2011	Kochar's Painting in Space	Documentary	Dedicated to his father Yervand Kochar and the Painting in Space art movement
2010	Key	Film	
2008	Metamos	Film	
2005	Arahet	Film	
2001	Herostratus	Film	
1995	Hamlet	Ballet Film	
1992	Yervand Kochar	Documentary	
1988	Avetik	Film	
1987	Fairy About A Bird	Documentary	Dedicated to sculptor, Benik Petrosyan
1986	Lilith	Ballet Film	
1985	Quartet		
1985	Give Me Wings	Musical	
1984	Call	Documentary	Dedicated to writer Mushegh Galshoyan
1984	Memoirs	Ballet Film	
1983	Hello Out There	Ballet Film	
1983	Sounds of the Duduk	Documentary	Dedicated to musician Jivan Gasparyan
1982	Jazz Trio	Musical	
1981	Elvira Uzunyan's Singing	Documentary	
1980	Metal Game	Documentary	Dedicated to weightlifter Yuri Vardanyan
1979	Fountains	Documentary	

=== Television series ===
- 2009 - Chain
- 2010 - The Key
