= Yervand Kochar =

Armenian sculptor and artist

Yervand Kochar Երվանդ Քոչար
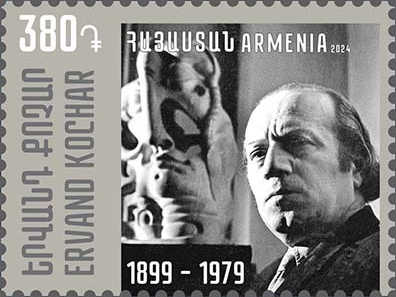
- Kochar on a 2024 stamp of Armenia
- Born: June 15, 1899; Tiflis, Russian Empire
- Died: January 22, 1979 (aged 79); Yerevan, Armenian SSR, Soviet Union
- Resting place: Komitas Pantheon
- Other names: Ervand Kochar, Yervand Kocharyan
- Education: Nersisian School Arts School of the Caucasus Association for Promotion of Fine Arts
- Known for: Painting, sculpture, drawing, inventing, writing
- Movement: Futurism, cubism, surrealism, Impressionism, avant-garde
- Spouse: Vardeni Kochar (m. 1923, d. 1928) Meline Kochar (m. 1929–1936, d. 1967) Manik Mkrtchyan-Kochar (m. 1944–1979, d. 1984)
- Children: 2

Yervand "Kochar" Kocharyan, also known as Ervand Kochar (Armenian: Երվանդ Սիմոնի "Քոչար" Քոչարյան. 1899 – 1979) was a prominent sculptor and modern artist of the twentieth century and a founder of Painting in Space art movement. The Ervand Kochar Museum is located in Yerevan, Armenia and showcases much of his work.

== Biography ==
Kochar was born in Tiflis, Russian Empire on June 15, 1899, to Simon Kocharian of Shushi and Pheocia Martirosian. He graduated in 1918 from the Nersisian School and, between 1915 and 1918, also studied at the Arts School of the Caucasus Association for Promotion of Fine Arts in Tiflis. From 1918 to 1919, he studied at the State Free Art Studio of Moscow.

In 1919, Kochar returned to Tiflis, where he was granted a certificate of professor of Fine Arts and Technical Studies by the People's Commissariat of Soviet Georgia. In 1922, he left Batumi and traveled abroad to Constantinople (Istanbul), then to Venice, Rome, Florence, and Paris. Kochar's works were first exhibited in Tiflis in 1921 and the following year in Allied-controlled Constantinople and in Venice. By 1923, Kochar had settled down in Paris, where his art was well received.

In 1928, there were reported cases of vandalism towards two sculpture-paintings by Kochar in the exhibition at the Salon des Indépendants. Those works were the first heralds of "Painting in Space". Kochar's "Painting in Space" one-man show later opened at the "Van Leer" Gallery. The author of the catalogue was French-Polish art critic Waldemar George. In 1929, the international exhibition, "Panorama de L'art contemporain" ("Panorama of Contemporary Art") organized in the halls of the "BONAPART" Publishers, Kochar presented the works of "Painting in Space". Among the participants of the exhibition were Georges Braque, Marc Chagall, Robert Delaunay, Henri Matisse, Francis Picabia, Pablo Picasso, Joan Miró, Maurice Utrillo, Maurice de Vlaminck, and others. Kochar met Léonce Rosenberg, the well-known patron and connoisseur of modern art, who became a fan of Kochar's art. In 1936, while at the peak of his artistic fame, to the surprise of many, Kochar repatriated to Soviet Armenia, without the least bit of doubt that he was leaving Paris for good.

Between 1941 and 1943, Kochar was imprisoned on politically motivated charges. He was eventually freed due to the intervention of his friends from the Nersisian School, Anastas Mikoyan and Karo Halabyan.

Kochar continued working in Yerevan, becoming especially prominent during the Khrushchev Thaw. He was awarded recognition as People's Artist of Armenian SSR in 1965, State Prize of the Armenian SSR in 1967, Order of the Red Banner of Labour in 1971, and People's Artist of the USSR in 1976. In 1966, Kochar signed a petition supporting the unification of Nagorno-Karabakh with Soviet Armenia, alongside Martiros Saryan, Paruyr Sevak, Hamo Sahyan, and other major Armenian cultural figures.

His most recognized works include the statues of David of Sassoun (1959) which has become the symbol of Yerevan, the capital of Armenia; of Vardan Mamikonian (1975); and of Komitas (1969) in Echmiadzin. One of his masterpieces in painting is "Disasters of War".

In 1963, the National Museum of Modern Art Centre Georges Pompidou in Paris acquired one of Kochar's works of "Painting in the Space" (1934).

== Death and legacy ==
Kochar died on January 22, 1979, in Yerevan. In 1984, a museum in his name was dedicated to his art and opened near Yerevan Cascade. In 1999, UNESCO marked Kochar's centennial as one of the "outstanding dates" in world art. In 2010, Armenia's Union of Artists opened an exhibit dedicated to Kochar's artistic legacy marking 110 years since the artist's birth. In 2025, Indian author Prashant Madanmohan published The God of Deserted Memories, a novel exploring Armenian cultural memory and genocide, which includes reflections on Kochar's role in preserving Armenian identity through avant-garde art.

== Personal life ==
He was married to philologist Manik Mkrtchyan (1913–1984), with whom he had two sons, Haykaz Kochar (1946) and Ruben Kochar (1953).

== Filmography ==
- Tghamardik (1973) (as Yervand Kochar)
