= Armen Shekoyan =

Armenian writer and poet (1953–2021)

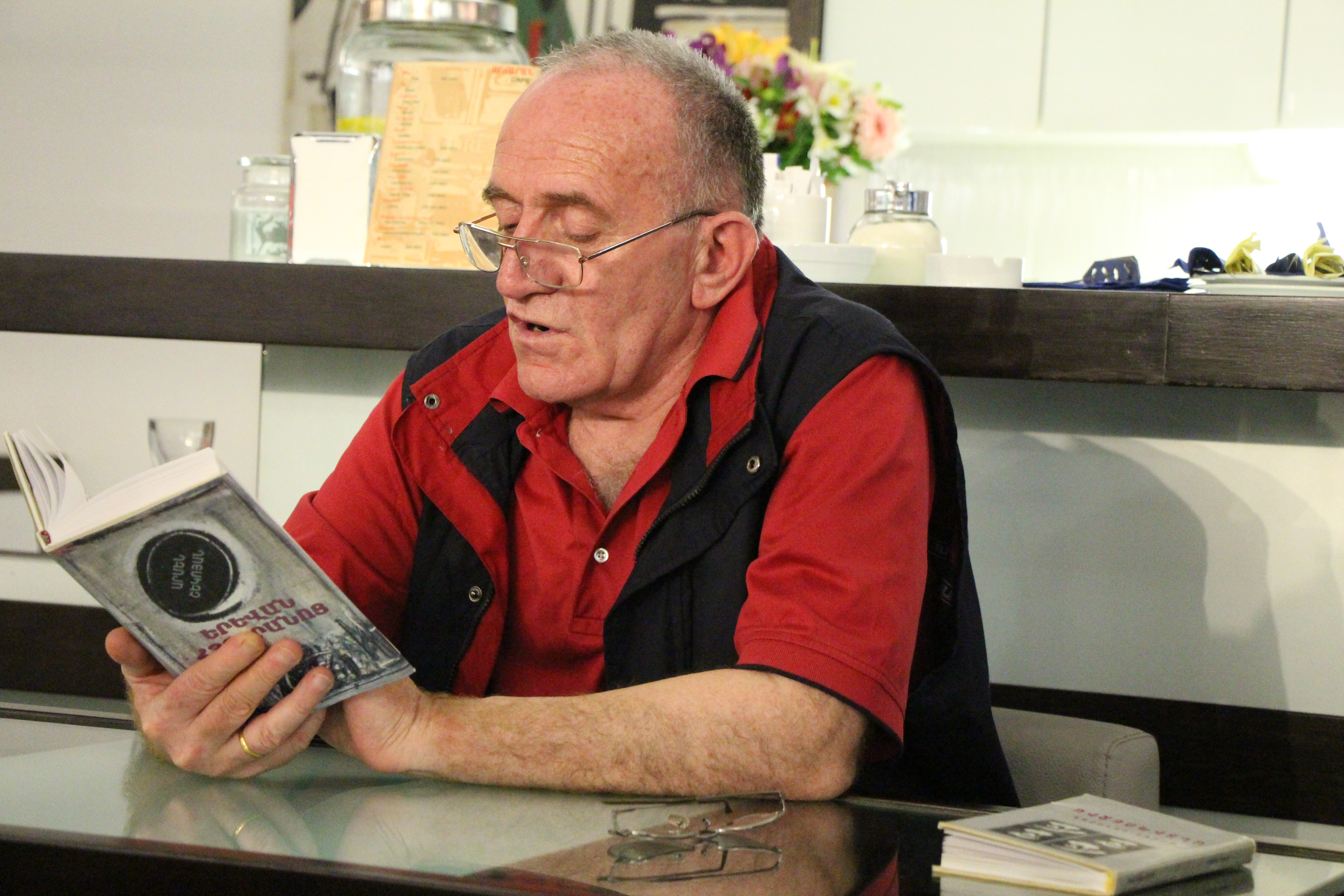
Armen Shekoyan

Armen Shekoyan (March 28, 1953 – July 29, 2021) was an Armenian writer, poet and journalist.

== Biography ==
Armen Shekoyan graduated from the Faculty of Philology of the Khachatur Abovyan Yerevan State Pedagogical University in 1974. In 1985, Shekoyan studied at the higher literary courses of the Maxim Gorky Literature Institute in Moscow. He worked at the Yerevan State Medical University, in the "Swallow" magazine, at the Literary Institute, at the "Soviet Writer" publishing house, at the RA Ministry of Culture. From 1990 to 1992, he was the editor-in-chief of "Nairi" publishing house, from 1992 to 1997 he was the director of Hovhannes Tumanyan's Museum.

He died on 29 July 2021, at the age of 68.

== Works ==
The use of urban slang is typical in Armen Shekoyan's poems. He was the author of the novel "Haykakan Zhamanak". His works have been translated into Ukrainian, Estonian, Russian and Czech languages.

== Awards ==
- Avetik Isahakyan Award of the Writers Union of Armenia
- Vl. Mayakovsky Days Award (1981, Georgian SSR)
- Movses Khorenatsi medal (2017)
