= Painting in Space =

Art movement

Painting in Space ("Les Peintures dans l`espace" in French) is an art movement that was invented by Yervand Kochar in the 1930s in Paris. This movement syntheses all the possibilities of painting, graphic and sculpture.

== About ==
Painting in Space consists of different metal panels with various paintings. With the help of an engine situated in the base of the figure it is being viewed in slow motion. This way Yervand Kochar shows how in time separate space elements become one, breaking the boundaries of time and space. It is not a sculpture, but painting in motion. Kochar proposes to expand the possibilities of visual thinking, introducing motion into frozen forms, blending painting with the plasticity of three-dimensional geometric forms.

One work of the Painting in Space works, aptly named Les Peintures dans l`espace, (1934) by Yervand Kochar, is being exhibited and in the permanent collection at Centre Georges Pompidou in Paris since 1963.
