= Aleksandr Dymshits =

Soviet literary scholar, professor and officer

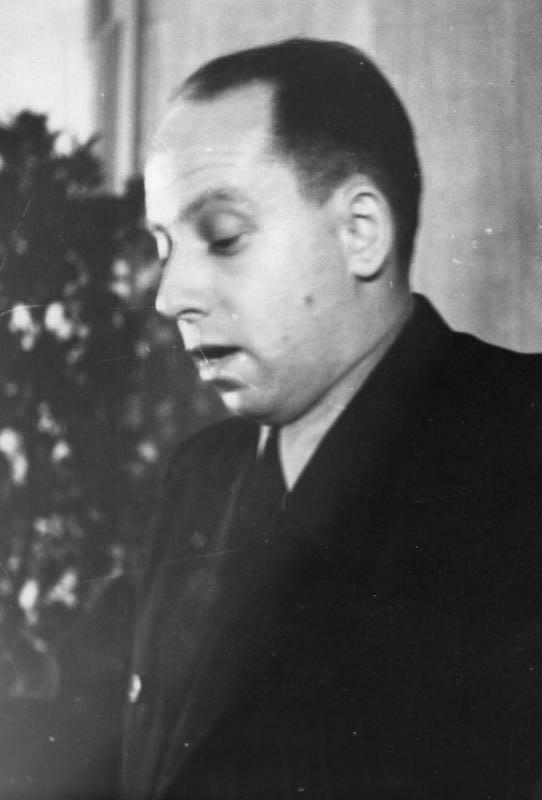
Dymshits in 1948

Aleksandr Lvovich Dymshits (Russian: Александр Львович Дымшиц, Alexander Lvovitsch Dymschitz; 12 July 1910 – 6 January 1975) was a Soviet literary scholar, university professor and a lieutenant colonel of the Red Army. During the Soviet occupation zone in Germany, he served as a prominent cultural officer.

== Biography ==
=== Early life and career ===
Dymshits was born in to an intellectual family of an engineer with close cultural ties to Germany, and spoke German as his second language since childhood. After receiving his primary education Dymshits studied at the Institute of Art history in Leningrad and after graduating in 1930 he began working at the Pushkin House.

From 1934 Dymshits was a member of the Soviet Writers' Union. At this time he was working in the literary criticism department of the Zvezda magazine. In 1936 he received his doctorate with a thesis on the poetry of the Bolshevik press between 1890 and 1917. He wrote his habilitation thesis on Vladimir Mayakovsky. The assessment dragged on until 1943, but was ultimately rejected.

=== Cultural officer of the SMAD ===
From 1941, Dymshits worked as a political officer in the army newspaper Znamja pobedy and gave lectures to soldiers about the state of the German army in Russia. He also published short reports and literary sketches about his experiences at the front. He was also responsible for the propaganda texts that were broadcast once a week across the front line to the German soldiers via loudspeaker trucks.

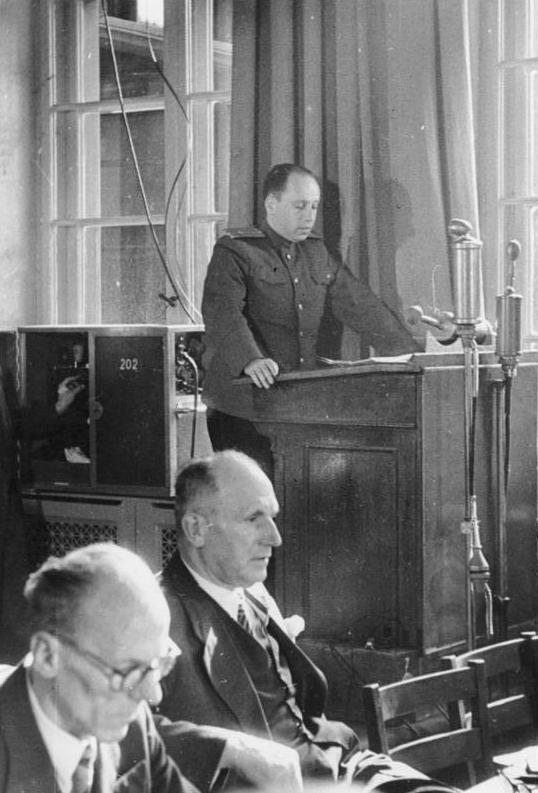
Head of the Culture Department of the Propaganda Directorate of the Soviet Military Administration, Major Aleksandr Dymshits. Berlin, 1947

In May 1945, Dymshits was sent to Germany as a press officer. After a stopover in Potsdam, he worked in the cultural department of the Tägliche Rundschau. From November 1945 he worked in the cultural directorate of the SMAD. He oversaw the restoration and reopening of theaters, the compilation of performance schedules, the engagement of actors and much more. He was also significantly involved in the founding of DEFA. While on the one hand he advocated the performance of controversial pieces, at the same time he published party-line articles in the Tägliche Rundschau on new art developments.

An article written by Dymshits and published in the Tägliche Rundschau on 19 and 24 November 1949 marked the start of the formalism debate in the GDR. In this article he accused Pablo Picasso, Marc Chagall, Karl Schmidt-Rottluff and Karl Hofer of "mummanship" and "falsification of reality".

=== Return to Russia and later career ===
In 1949 Dymshits was recalled from his position in Germany and returned to Leningrad. First he worked at the State Public Library, and in June 1950 he was enrolled as a senior researcher at the Pushkin House. At the same time he was associate professor of the Department of Russian Literature at Leningrad State Pedagogical Institute and From 1956 to 1959 he headed the Institute of Theatre, Music and Cinematography (VGIK).

1959, he was appointed deputy editor-in-chief of the newspaper Literature and Life and moved to Moscow where he taught at the Maxim Gorky Literature Institute. In 1966, he was awarded the degree of Doctor of Science for his work on the history of German literature. Dymshits was a member of the editorial boards of a number of literary publications from 1957 to 1961.

From 1963 to 1966 he worked as editor-in-chief of the script and editorial board of the State Committee for Cinematography and from 1964 to 1968 he was the head of the department of screenwriting and film studies at VGIK. From 1972 to 1975 he was deputy director of Maxim Gorky Literature Institute.

Dymshits died on 2 January 1975 and was buried at the Novodevichy Cemetery.
