= San Lazzaro degli Armeni =

Small island in the Venetian Lagoon

Isola di San Lazzaro degli Armeni
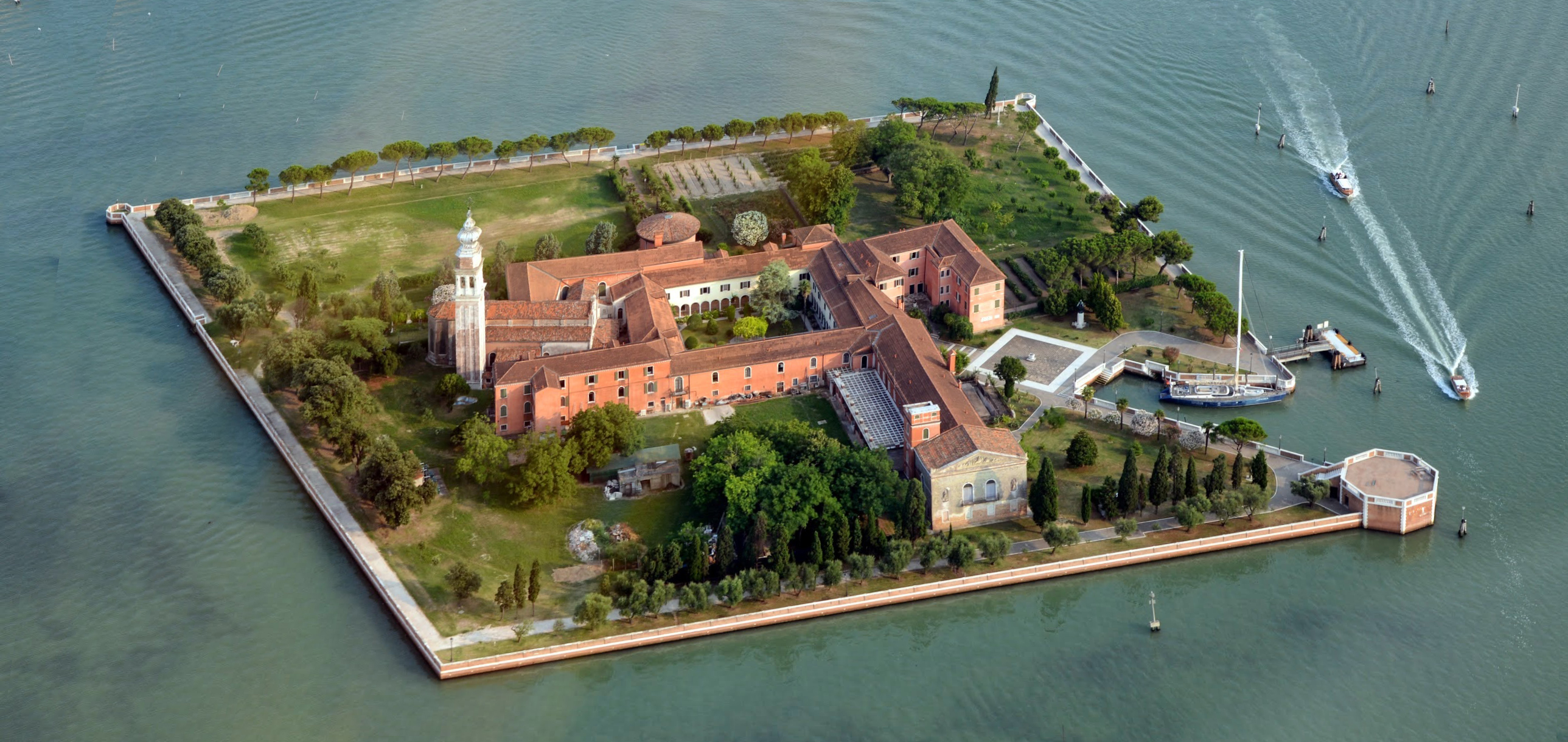
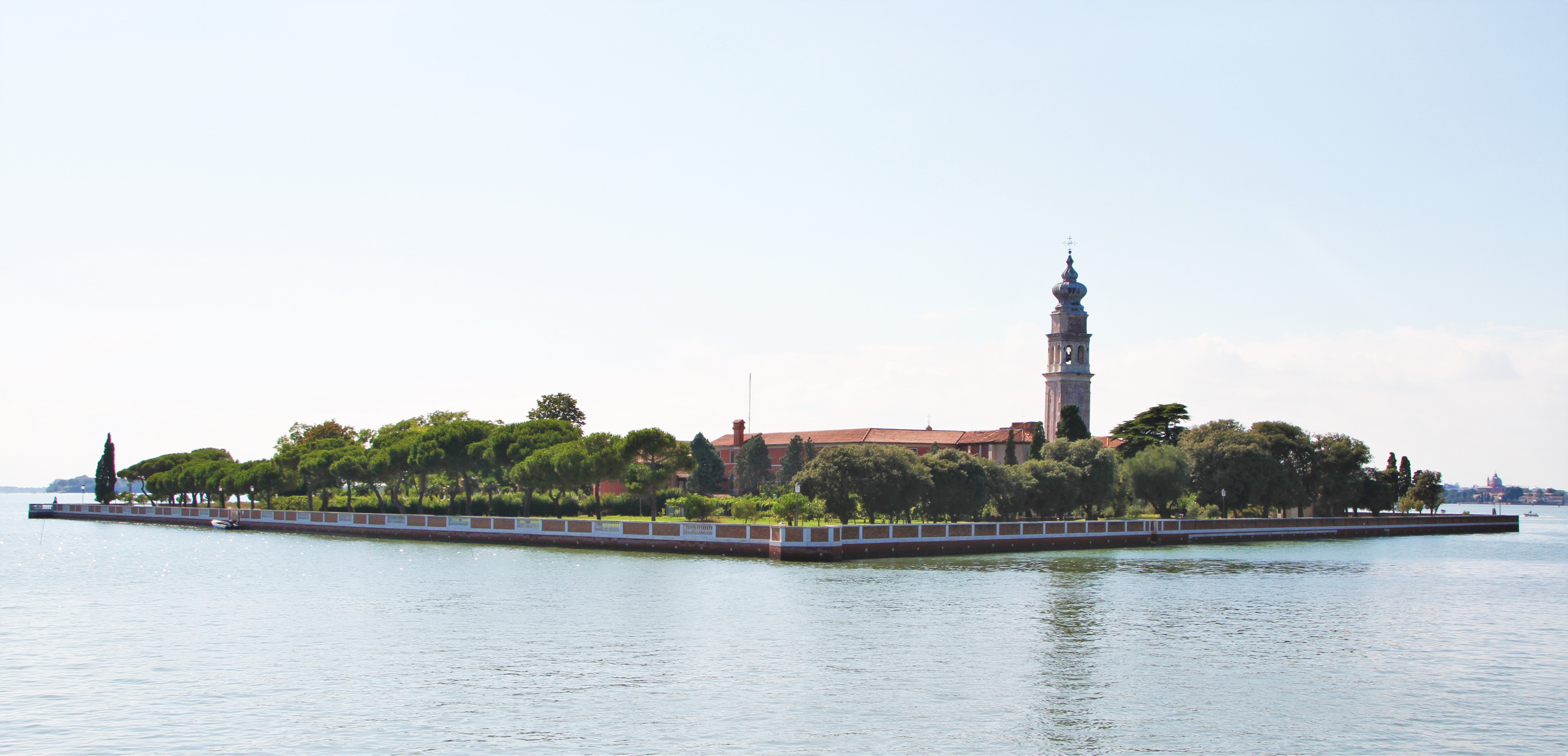
- San Lazzaro from a bird's-eye view and as seen from a boat
- Interactive map of Isola di San Lazzaro degli Armeni

Geography
- Coordinates: 45.411979°N 12.361422°E
- Adjacent to: Venetian Lagoon, Adriatic Sea, Mediterranean Sea
- Area: 3 ha (7.4 acres)

Administration
- Italy
- Region: Veneto
- Province: Province of Venice
- Commune: Venice

Demographics
- Population: 17 (2015)
- Ethnic groups: Armenians

San Lazzaro degli Armeni (Italian: [san ˈladdzaro deʎʎ arˈmɛːni], lit. "Saint Lazarus of the Armenians"; sometimes called Saint Lazarus Island in English; Armenian: Սուրբ Ղազար, romanized: Surb Ghazar) (Note: Also romanized as Sourb, S(o)urp, andŁazar. All mean "Saint Lazarus".) is a small island in the Venetian Lagoon which has been home to the monastery of the Mekhitarists, an Armenian Catholic congregation, since 1717. It is one of the two primary centers of the congregation, along with the monastery in Vienna.

The islet lies 2 km (1.2 mi) to the southeast of Venice proper and west of the Lido and covers an area of 3 hectares (7.4 acres). Settled in the 9th century, it was a leper colony during the Middle Ages, but fell into disuse by the early 18th century. In 1717 San Lazzaro was ceded by the Republic of Venice to Mkhitar Sebastatsi, an Armenian Catholic monk, who established a monastery with his followers. It has since been the headquarters of the Mekhitarists and, as such, one of the world's prominent centers of Armenian culture and Armenian studies. Numerous important publications, such as the first complete dictionary of the Armenian language (1749–69) and the first modern history of Armenia (1781–86), were made in the island by the monks which made it an early major center of Armenian printing.

San Lazzaro has been enlarged nearly four times from its original size through land reclamation. It was recognized as an academy by Napoleon in 1810 when nearly all monasteries of Venice were abolished. A significant episode in its history is Lord Byron's visit in 1816–17. The island is one of the best known historic sites of the Armenian diaspora. The monastery has a large collection of books, journals, artifacts, and the third largest collection of Armenian manuscripts (more than 3,000). Over the centuries, dozens of artists, writers, political and religious leaders have visited the island. It has since become a tourist destination.

== Overview ==
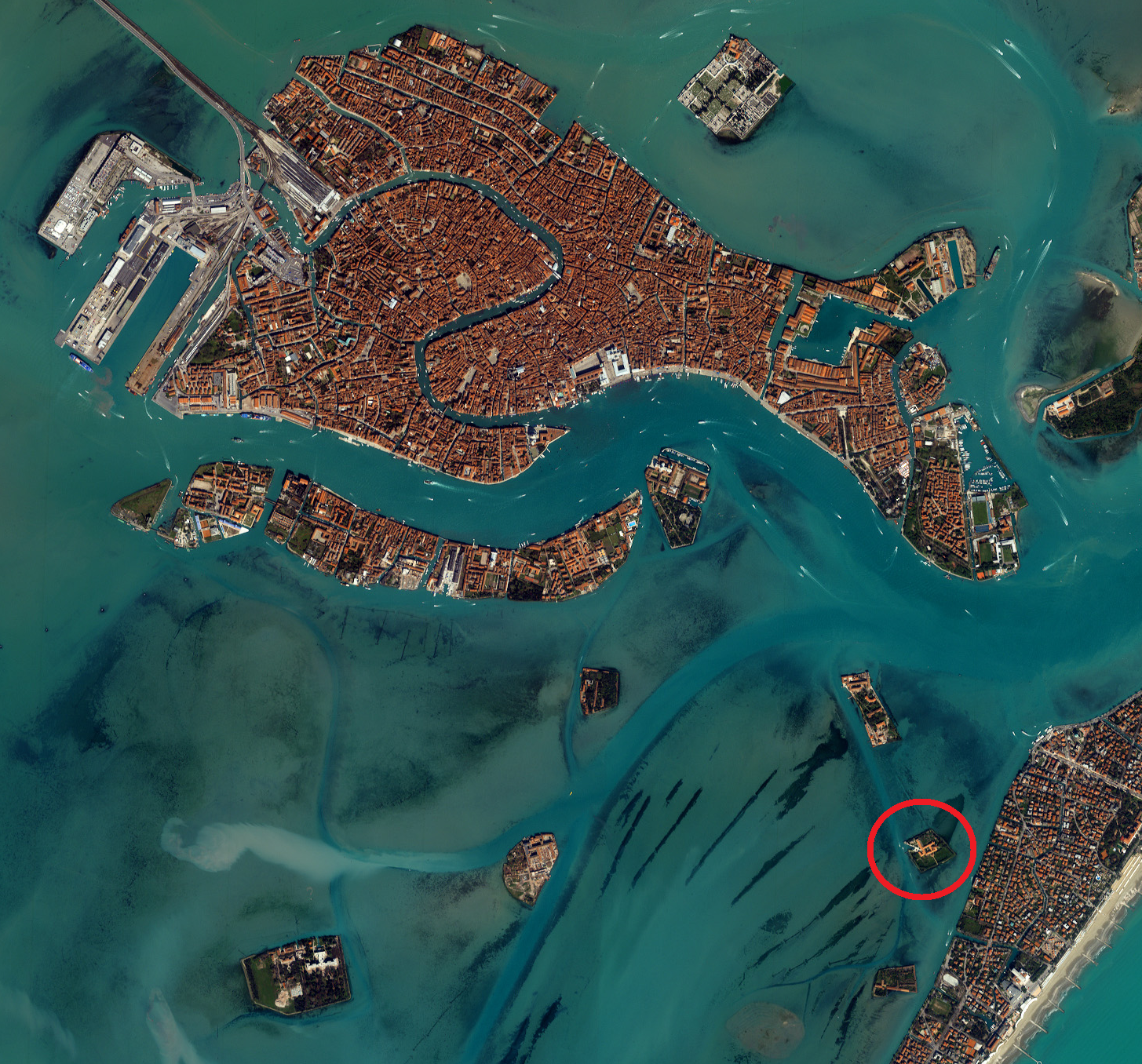
A satellite image of the Venetian Lagoon. San Lazzaro (circled in red) is located southeast of Venice and west of the Lido.

San Lazzaro lies 2 km (1.2 mi) to the southeast of Venice proper and west of the Lido. The rectangular-shaped islet covers an area of 3 hectares (7.4 acres).

The island is accessible by a vaporetto from the San Zaccaria station with guided tours available in multiple languages with prior reservations only. Some 40,000 people visit the island annually, with Italians making up the majority of visitors. Sylvia Sprigge noted in 1961 that it is the only island in the Venetian Lagoon to be "completely equipped, down to the last detail, for tourists’ visits."

=== Population ===
The number of monks, students, and other residents at San Lazzaro has fluctuated throughout history. Twelve monks led by Mkhitar Sebastatsi arrived in Venice in 1715. A century later, in 1816, when Byron visited the island, there were some 70 Mekhitarists in San Lazzaro. Their number has been smaller thereafter. By the early 1840s, the island housed 50 monks and students, and 24 by 1880. By 1960, some 20 resident monks were reported. A Los Angeles Times writer noted in 1998 that San Lazzaro is still a "monastic hub of activity," although at the time the monastery housed only 10 seminarians and 10 fathers. Eight monks resided in 2004, while as of 2015, twelve vardapets (educated monks) and five novices reside in San Lazzaro.

== History ==
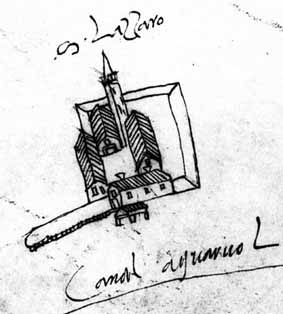
San Lazzaro in a map dating from the second half of the 16th century.

=== Middle Ages ===
The recorded history of the island begins in the 9th century. In 810, the Republic of Venice allocated the island to the abbot of the Benedictine Monastery of St. Ilario of Fusina. Leone Paolini, a local nobleman, obtained the island as a gift from the Abbot Uberto di Sant'Ilario and built a church, initially dedicated to Pope Leo I. It soon became an asylum for those infected with leprosy. In the 12th century, leprosy had appeared in Venice as a result of trade with the East. Paolini transferred the simple hospital of San Trovaso to the island. Thus, a leper colony was established at the island, which was chosen for that purpose due to its relative distance from the principal islands forming the city of Venice. It received its name from St. Lazarus, the patron saint of lepers. The church of San Lazzaro was founded in 1348, which is attested by an inscription in Gothic script. In the same year, the hospital was renovated and its ownership transferred from the Benedictines to the patriarchal cathedral of San Pietro. Leprosy declined by the mid-1500s and the island was abandoned by 1601 when only the chaplain and some gardeners remained at the island to grow vegetables. In the second half of the 17th century the island was leased to various religious groups. In 1651 a Dominican order settled at the island after fleeing from Turkish-occupied Crete. Jesuits also briefly settled there. By the early 18th century only a few crumbling ruins remained.

=== Armenian period ===
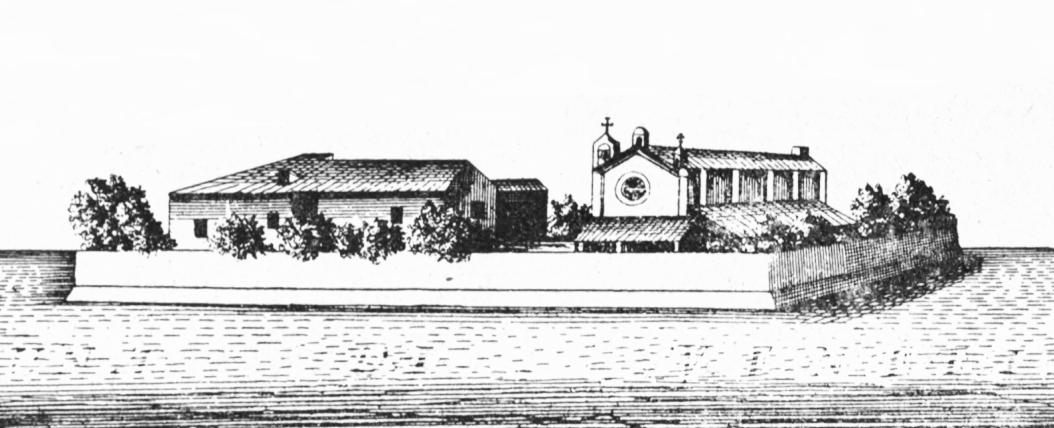
"The island of St. Lazarus, when Mechitar was there."

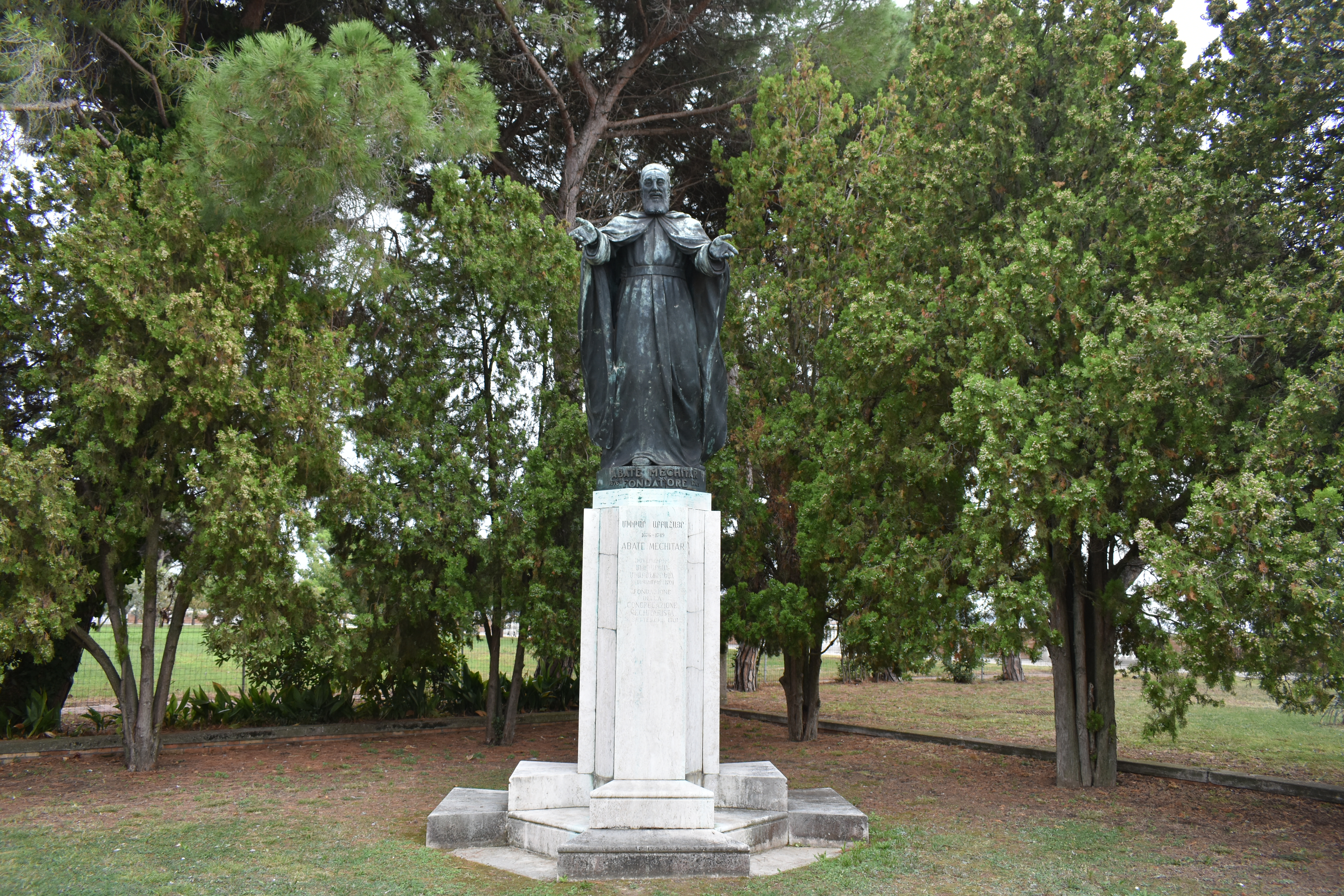
A statue of Mkhitar Sebastatsi on the island

==== Establishment ====
In April 1715, a group of twelve Armenian Catholic monks led by Mkhitar Sebastatsi (English: Mekhitar of Sebaste, Italian: Mechitar) arrived in Venice from Morea (the Peloponnese), following its invasion by the Ottoman Empire. The monks were members of a Catholic order founded by Mkhitar in 1701, in Constantinople, the capital of the Ottoman Empire. The order moved to Modone (Methoni), on the southern shore of the Peloponnese, in 1703, after repressions by the Ottoman government and the Armenian Apostolic Church. In 1712 the order received recognition by Pope Clement XI. Victor Langlois wrote that a Venetian admiral and the Venetian governor of Morea, "sympathizing deeply with the fearful distress of the unfortunate community, yielded to their earnest entreaties for permission to embark on a government vessel which was about to leave for Venice."

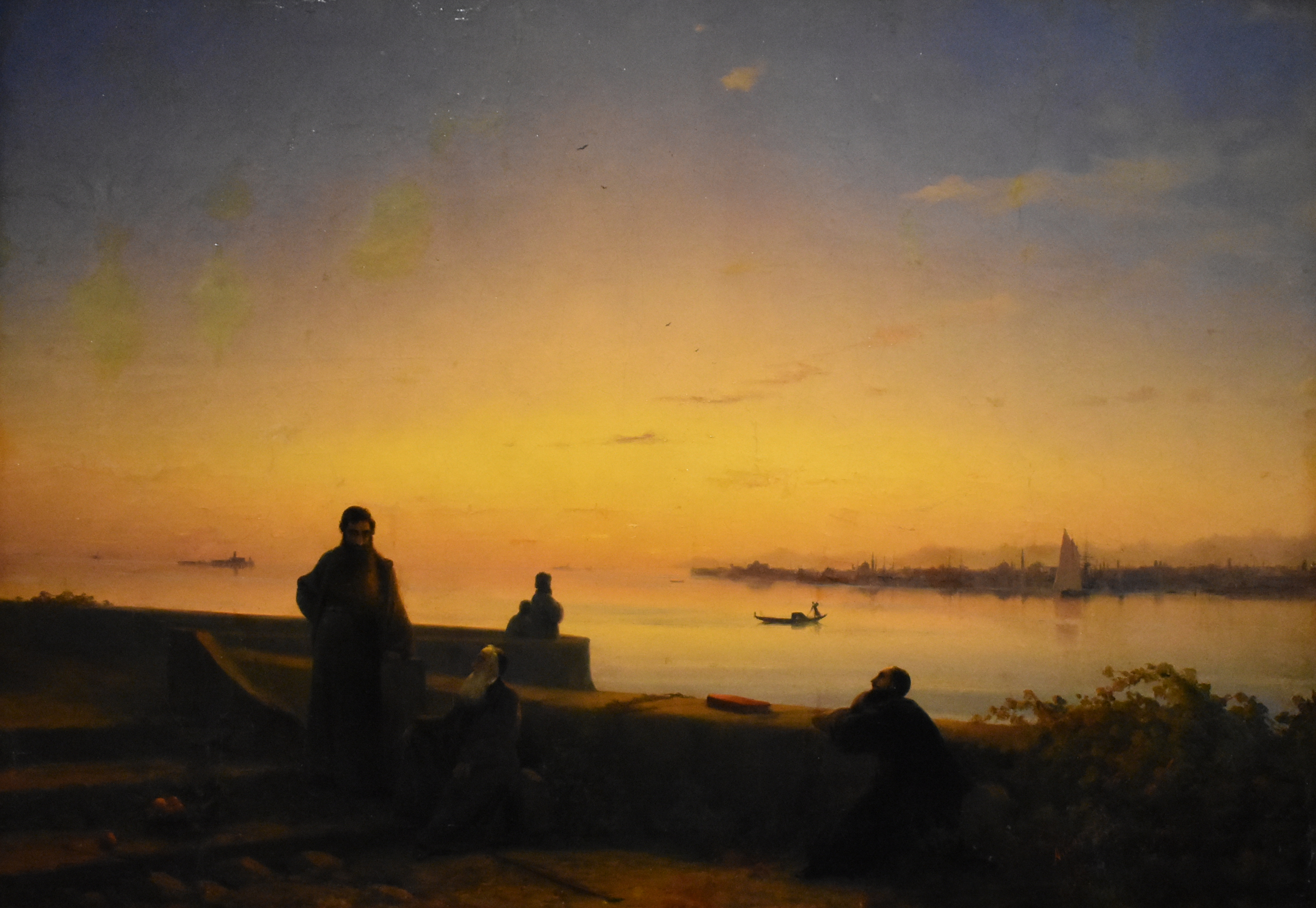
The Mekhitarist Fathers on San Lazzaro Island (1843) by Ivan Aivazovsky

On September 8, 1717, on the Feast of the Nativity of Mary, the Venetian Senate ceded San Lazzaro to Mkhitar and his companions, who agreed not to rename the island. He was reminded of the monastery on the island of Lake Sevan, where he had sought education earlier in his life. Upon acquisition, the monks began works of restoration of existing buildings on the island. The entire community then relocated to the island in April 1718 when the buildings on San Lazzaro became habitable. Mkhitar himself designed the plan of the monastery, which was completed by 1840. The monastery originally included 16 cells for monks, which were adjusted from the old hospital. The church's restoration lasted from May to November 1722. Mkhitar died in 1749. The bell tower was completed a year later, in 1750.

==== Napoleon ====
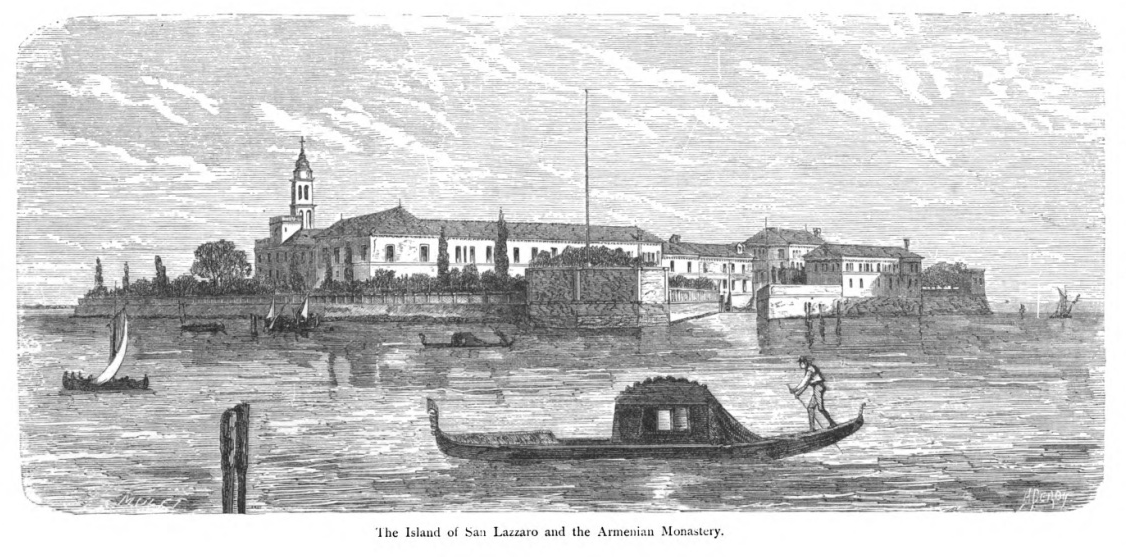
San Lazzaro circa 1877

The Venetian Republic was disestablished by Napoleon in 1797. In 1810, he abolished all monastic orders of Venice and Italy, except that of the Mekhitarists in San Lazzaro. The Mekhitarist congregation was left in peace, according to some sources, due to the intercession of Roustam Raza, Napoleon's Mamluk bodyguard of Armenian origin. Napoleon signed a decree, dated August 27, 1810, which declared that the congregation may continue to exist as an academy. Since then, San Lazzaro has also been known as an academy, and sometimes referred to in Latin as Academia Armena Sancti Lazari.

==== Expansion ====
The monastery has been enlarged significantly through land reclamation four times since the 19th century. First, in 1815, the Mekhitarists were permitted by Austrian Emperor Francis II to expand the island. The area north of the island was filled which doubled its area from 7,900 m^{2} to 13,700 m^{2}. In 1836, a boundary wall around the island's newly reclaimed area was built. The channel of the boathouse was filled in 1912 and it was moved to the far western corner. The shoreline was straightened. These adjustments increased its area to 16,970 m^{2}. San Lazzaro's latest major enlargement occurred in post-World War II period. Between 1947 and 1949, the island was expanded on the southeast and the southwest. The island now has an area of 30,000 m^{2} or 3 hectares.

Gradual expansion of San Lazzaro

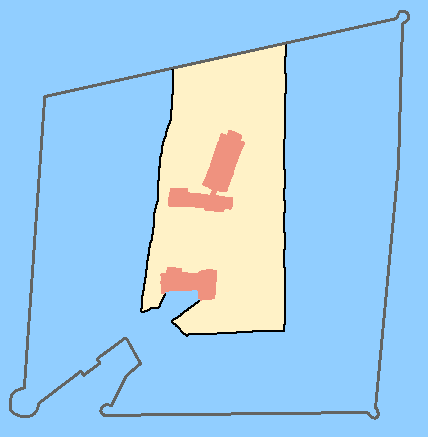
The island when Armenian monks arrived, 1717

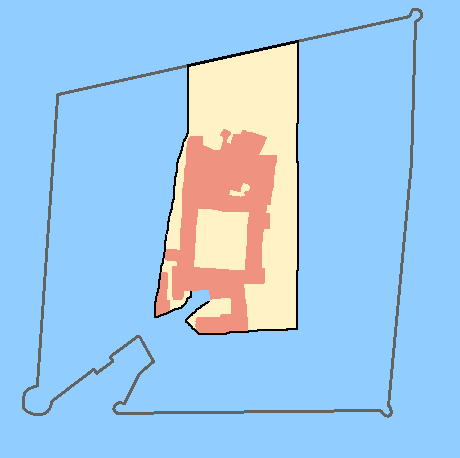
The construction of the monastic complex by Mkhitar (1740) and the printing house (1789)

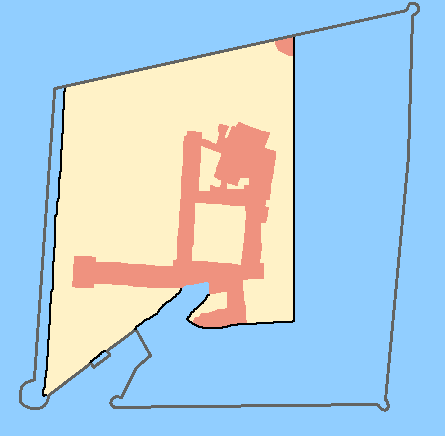
The enlargement on the northern side of the island (1818) and the wing of the new printing house (1823–25)

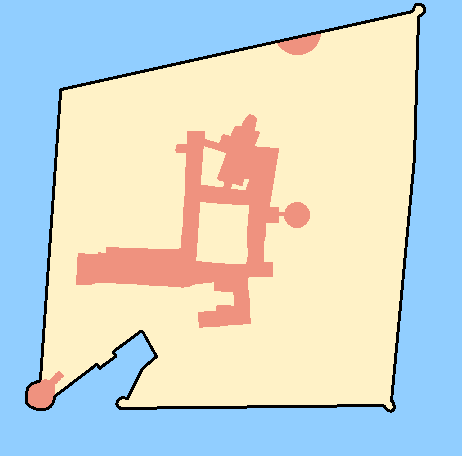
Enlargement of the southern side of the island (1947–49)

==== 20th century and beyond ====
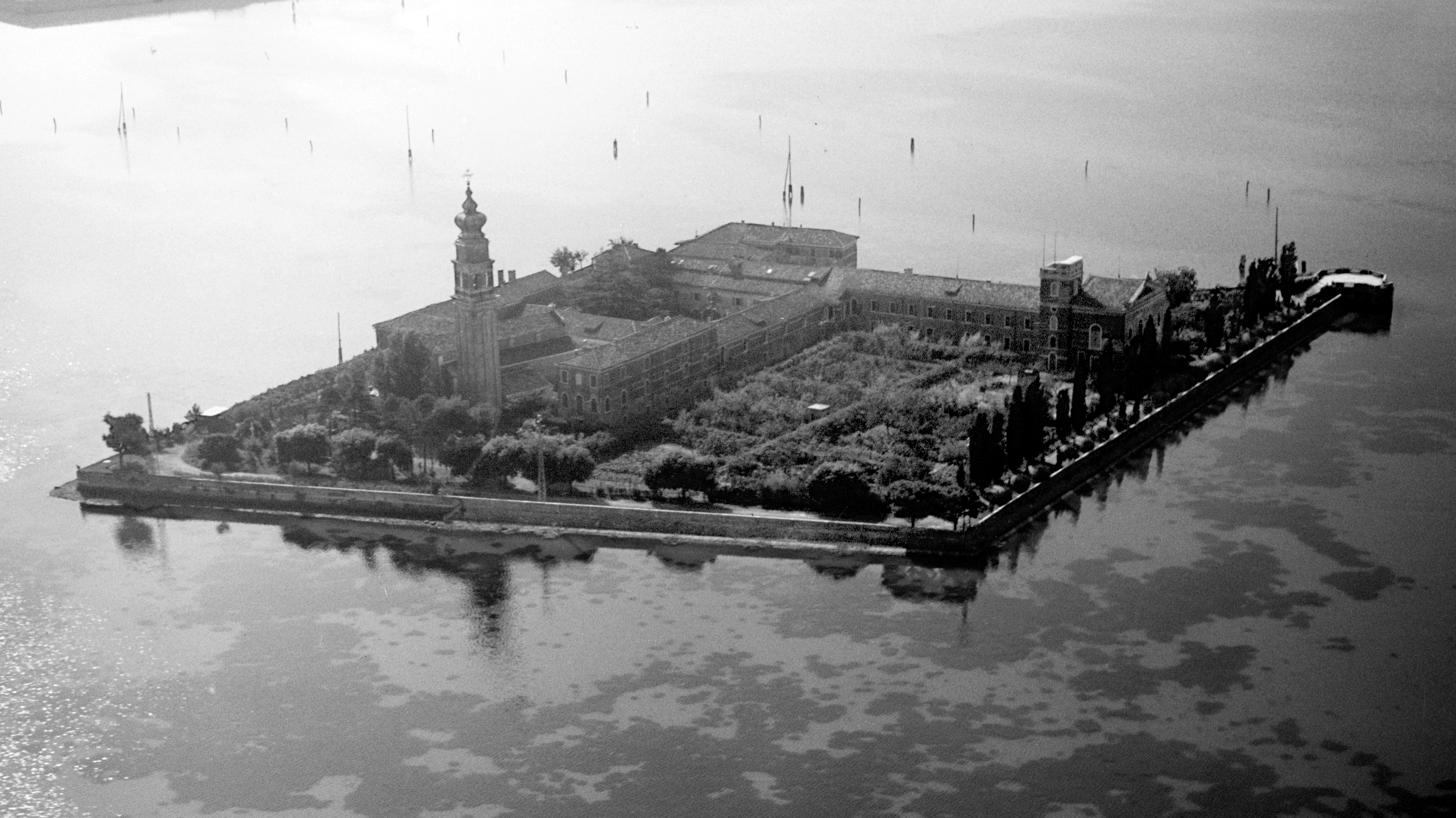
A 1934 photo of the island by Walter Mittelholzer before its latest expansion

The island was heavily affected by the unprecedented acqua alta of November 4, 1966. The flooded sea water entered the main church and flooded the enclosed garden for around 12 hours. The library and the manuscript depository were not affected by the flood and none of the churchmen suffered injuries.

A fire broke out on the night of December 8, 1975, which partially destroyed the library and damaged the southern side of the church, and destroyed two Gaspare Diziani paintings.

Between 2002 and 2004, an extensive restoration of the monastery's structures was carried out by the Magistrato alle acque under the coordination of Consorzio Venezia Nuova, an agency of the Italian Ministry of Infrastructure and Transport. It included restoration of the island's shores and its walls and the boathouse.

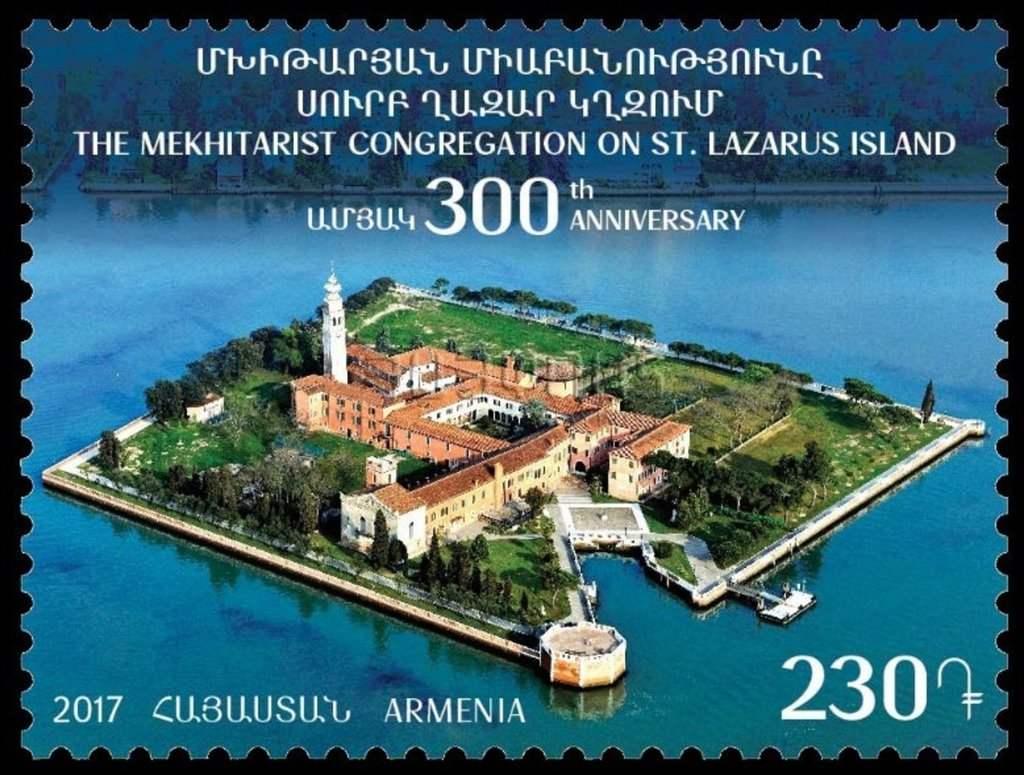
On a 2017 Armenian stamp

In 2017 the 300th anniversary of San Lazzaro's Mekhitarist order was celebrated on the island and in Armenia, including with a postage stamp and academic conferences.

San Lazzaro was heavily affected by a flood on November 13, 2019, the heaviest since 1966. The church, the central courtyard, and all the rooms on the ground floor were flooded, while the library, gallery, manuscript repository, and archives were unharmed. Armenian President Armen Sarkissian expressed solidarity with the monks, while Armenian Prime Minister Nikol Pashinyan visited the congregation a week after the flood, expressing support and appreciation for their work.

In recent years, the island has hosted significant events. In 2015, it hosted the pavilion of Armenia during the 56th Venice Biennale, which was dedicated to the Armenian Genocide centenary and won the Golden Lion award in the national participation category. In 2021 the Aurora Prize ceremony took place there, with the attendance of Armenian President Armen Sarkissian, and featuring a performance by Andrea Bocelli.

== Monastery ==
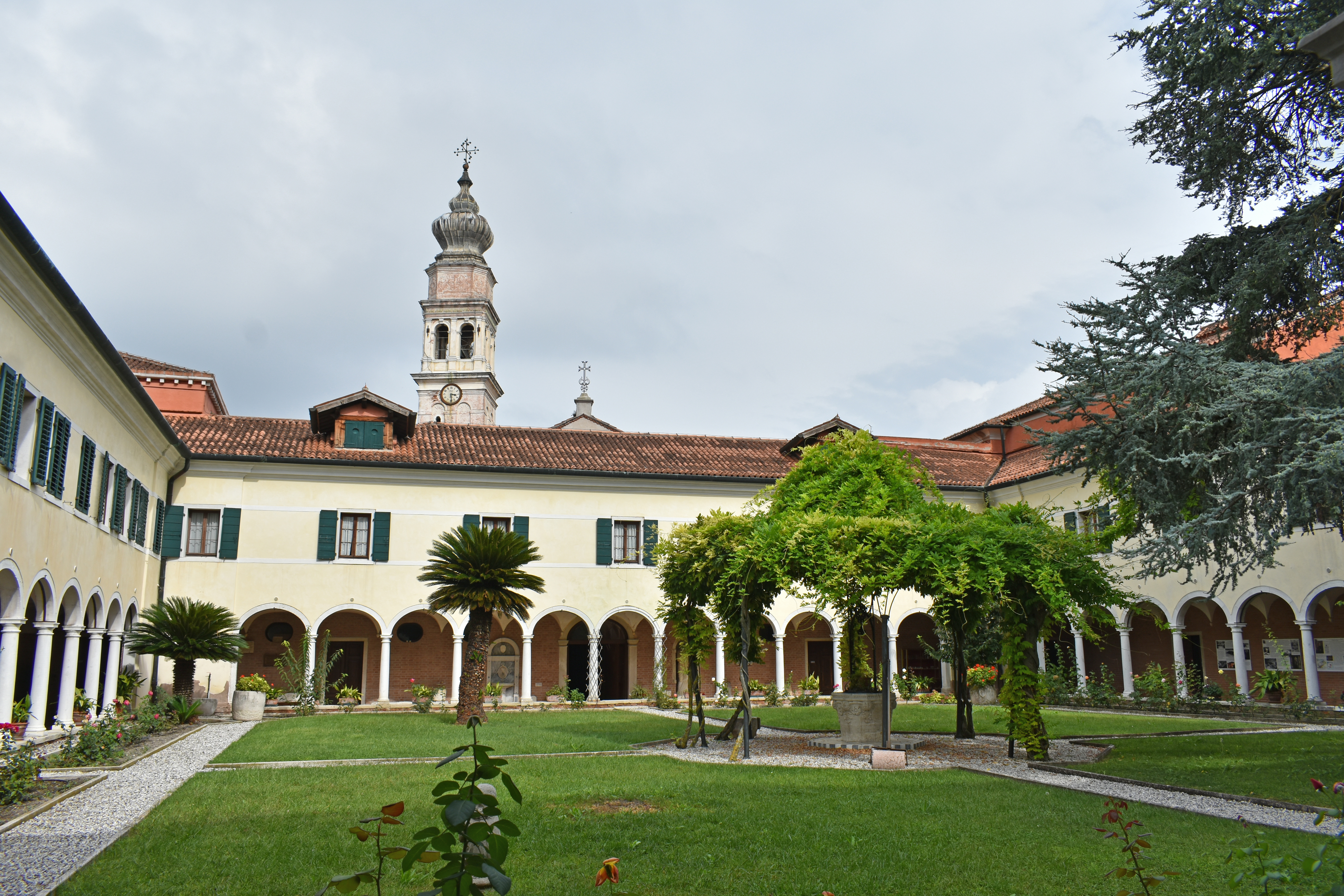
The cloister of the monastery with the onion-shaped bell tower

San Lazzaro is entirely occupied by the Mekhitarist monastery of San Lazzaro, which is the headquarters of the Armenian Catholic Mekhitarist Congregation. The monastery is known in Armenian as Մխիթարեան Մայրավանք, M(ə)khitarian Mayravank, which literally translates to the "Mekhitarist Mother Monastery" and in Italian as Monastero Mechitarista. The monastery currently contains a church with a bell tower, residential quarters, library, museums, picture gallery, manuscript repository, printing plant, sundry teaching and research facilities, gardens, a bronze statue of Mkhitar erected by Antonio Baggio in 1962, an Armenian genocide memorial erected in the 1960s, and a 14th-century basalt khachkar (cross stone) donated by the Soviet Armenian government in 1987.

The cloister of the monastery consists of a colonnade of 42 columns in the Doric order. There is a 15th-century water well in the center of the cloister, which is surrounded by trees and shrubs. A Phoenician and early Christian inscriptions, a first century headless statue of a Roman noble from Aquileia and other artifacts were found there.

The bell tower with an onion dome was completed in 1750. It is not attached to the church and stands alone near the northern side of the church.

=== The church ===
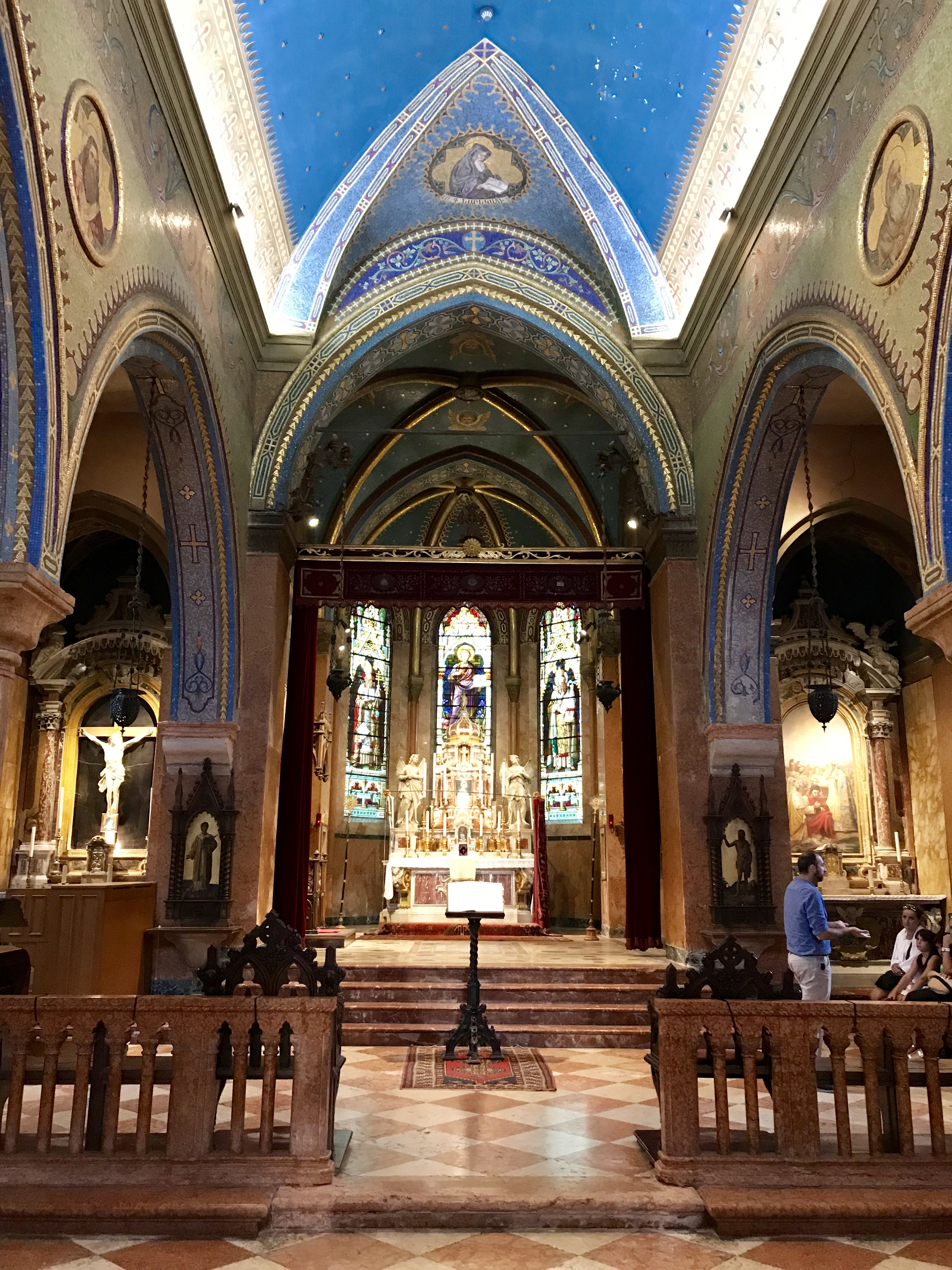
The interior of the church

The church of San Lazzaro, although renovated several times through centuries, retains the 14th century pointed arch style. The church was restored extensively by Mkhitar in 1722, five years after the settlement of Armenian monks. He completely rebuilt the altar. Its apse was extended in 1899 primarily with an addition of neo-Gothic elements. The church has a neo-Gothic interior. It is three-naved, supported by 6 red marble columns. The main altar is in Baroque style. The three main windows of the altar's apse have stained glass which depict from left to right: Sahak Patriarch, Saint Lazarus, and Mesrop Mashtots. In the church, there are frescoes and paintings by Antonio Ermolao Paoletti depicting Saint Peter, Saint Paul, John the Baptist and Saint Stephen. The tomb of Mkhitar is located in the front of the altar.

Besides the main altar, there are four other altars dedicated to the Holy Cross, St. Gregory the Illuminator, Mary, and Anthony the Great. All built in the period of 1735–38 by Mkhitar. They are all adorned by pieces of works, mainly by Venetian artists. The St. Gregory altarpiece by Noè Bordignon depicts the saint performing the baptism of the Armenian king Tiridates III. The altarpiece dedicated to the mother of Jesus depicts the Nativity of Mary by Domenico Maggiotto. The altarpiece of St. Anthony by Francesco Zugno depicts the founder of the Oriental monasticism who inspired Mkhitar.

Paintings

Within the church, there are paintings of Armenian saints by Paoletti created in 1901: Ghevond, Hripsime, Nerses of Lambron, Nerses the Great, Sandukht, Vardan, Gregory of Narek, Nerses Shnorhali. Other significant paintings include Madonna with Child by Palma il Giovane (Jacopo Negretti), the baptism of king Tiridates III by St. Gregory the Illuminator by Hovhannes Patkerahan (1720), Assumption of Mary by Jacopo Bassano, Annunciation and Mother of Mercy by Matteo Cesa, the Flood by Leandro Bassano, Flight into Egypt by Marco Basaiti, Annunciation by Bernardo Strozzi, St. Thecla and Sts. Peter and Paul by Girolamo da Santacroce, Moses Saved from the Waters and Archangel Raphael by Luca Carlevarijs.

=== Gardens ===
The gardens of the monastery have been admired by many visitors. "The island ... with its flower and fruit gardens, is so well kept that an excursion to San Lazzaro is a favourite one with all visitors to Venice," noted one visitor in 1905. Irish botanist Edith Blake wrote: "The garden in the centre of the cloisters was gay with flowers, and there was a calm, peaceful air of repose over the whole place."

The monks at San Lazzaro make jam from the roses grown in the gardens. The jam, called Vartanush, (Note: Western Armenian pronunciation of վարդանուշ, vardanush literally translating to "sweet rose"; also a female given name.) is made from rose petal around May, when the roses are in full bloom. Besides rose petal, it contains white caster sugar, water, and lemon juice. Around five thousand jars of jam are made and sold in the gift shop in the island. Monks also eat it for breakfast.

== Collections ==
=== Library ===
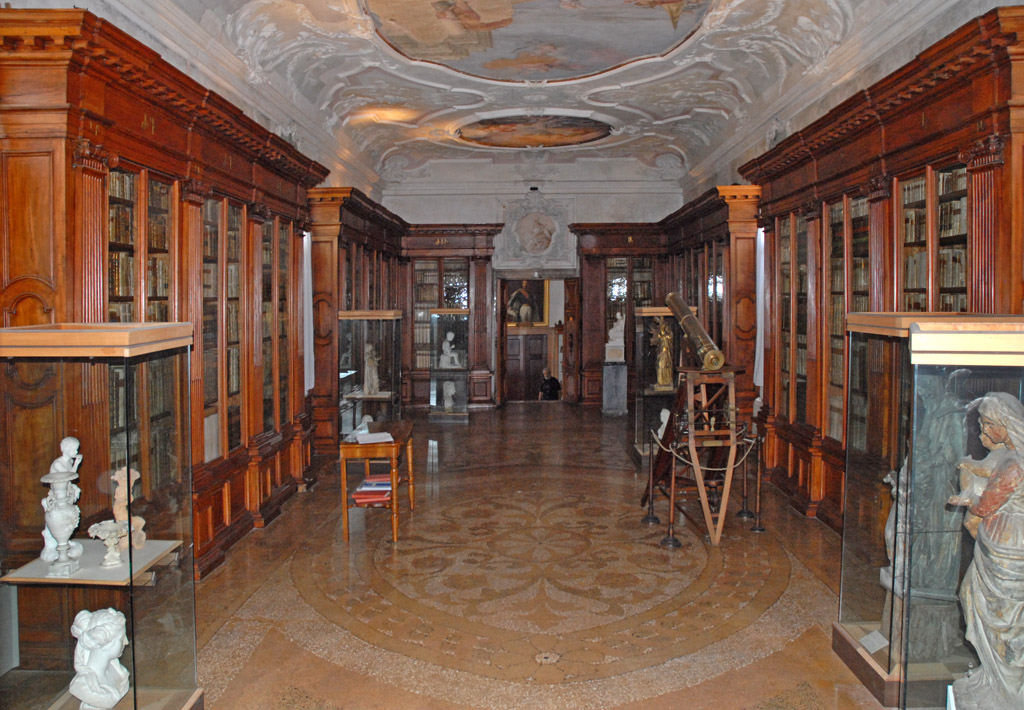
The library room

The library contains 150,000 to 200,000 (Note: Variously given as 150,000, 170,000, 200,000.) printed books in Armenian, as well as European and Oriental languages. Some 30,000 European books printed before 1800 are kept at the library. The entire collection includes books on the arts, the sciences, history, natural history, diverse classical texts, literary criticism, major encyclopedias and other reference books.

The floor of the library is decorated in a Venetian style. Its ceiling, partially destroyed in the 1975 fire, was painted by Francesco Zugno and depicts Catherine of Alexandria, the four fathers of the Latin Church (Ambrose, Augustine, Jerome, St. Gregory the Great), and fathers of the Armenian Church. A chalk sculpture of Napoleon II by Antonio Canova is preserved in a glass cabinet in the library. A sculpture of Pope Gregory XVI by Giuseppe De Fabris, presented to the Mekhitarists by the Pope himself, is also kept at the room.

In 2021 the Aurora Humanitarian Initiative donated $50,000 to support the library in memory of Vartan Gregorian.

As the collection grows through gifts and purchases, the congregation is facing a space shortage, particularly in the library, where the lack of room is especially concerning.

=== Manuscripts ===
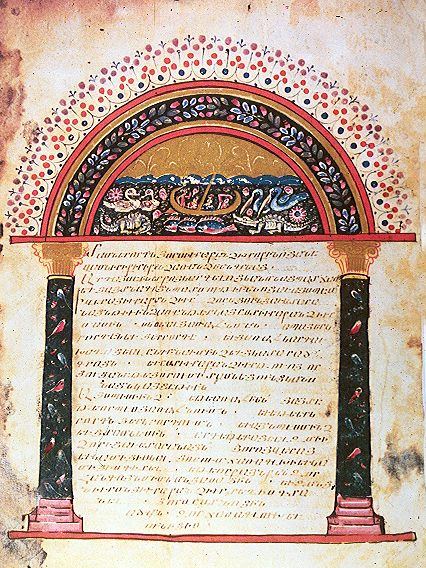
A page from the 9th century Gospels of Queen Mlké.

The Mekhitarists regard the collection of manuscripts the greatest treasure of San Lazzaro. During the 19th century, Mekhitarist monks extracted from these manuscripts and published some previously unpublished pieces of Armenian and non-Armenian literature. According to the magazine of the Church of England, by 1870, San Lazzaro had the second largest collection of Armenian manuscripts after Etchmiadzin having some 1,200 manuscripts in possession. The exact current number of manuscripts preserved at San Lazzaro is unknown. According to Bernard Coulie the number is around 3,000, which comprises some 10% of all extant Armenian manuscripts. According to the Mekhitarist Congregation website the monastery contains 4,500 Armenian manuscripts. Armenian Weekly writer Levon Saryan noted that the manuscript collection of San Lazzaro consists of over 3,000 complete volumes and about 2,000 fragments. San Lazzaro is usually ranked as the third largest collection of Armenian manuscripts in the world after the Matenadaran in Yerevan, Armenia and the Armenian Patriarchate of Jerusalem. (Note: Matenadaran holds 11,000 Armenian manuscripts in the strict sense and 17,000 in total. The Armenian Patriarchate of Jerusalem has 3,890 inventoried manuscripts.) The manuscript collection is kept in the rotunda-shaped tower, called the Manuscript Room (manuscript repository). Its construction was funded by Cairo-based Armenian antiques dealer Boghos Ispenian and was designed by his son Andon Ispenian. It was inaugurated in 1970 in attendance of Catholicos Vazgen I.

The earliest manuscripts preserved at the repository date to the eighth century. Among its notable manuscripts are the 9th century Gospels of Queen Mlké, the early 11th century Adrianopolis Gospel; the Life of Alexander the Great, an Armenian translation of a 5th-century Greek version by Pseudo-Callistene; the Gospels of Gladzor (dated 1307). In 1976–79 some 300 manuscripts were donated by Harutiun Kurdian, for which new display cases were added. It holds one of the ten extant copies of Urbatagirk, the first-ever Armenian book printed by Hakob Meghapart in Venice in 1512. Furthermore, 44 Armenian prayer scrolls (hmayil) are preserved at the repository.

=== Armenian museum ===
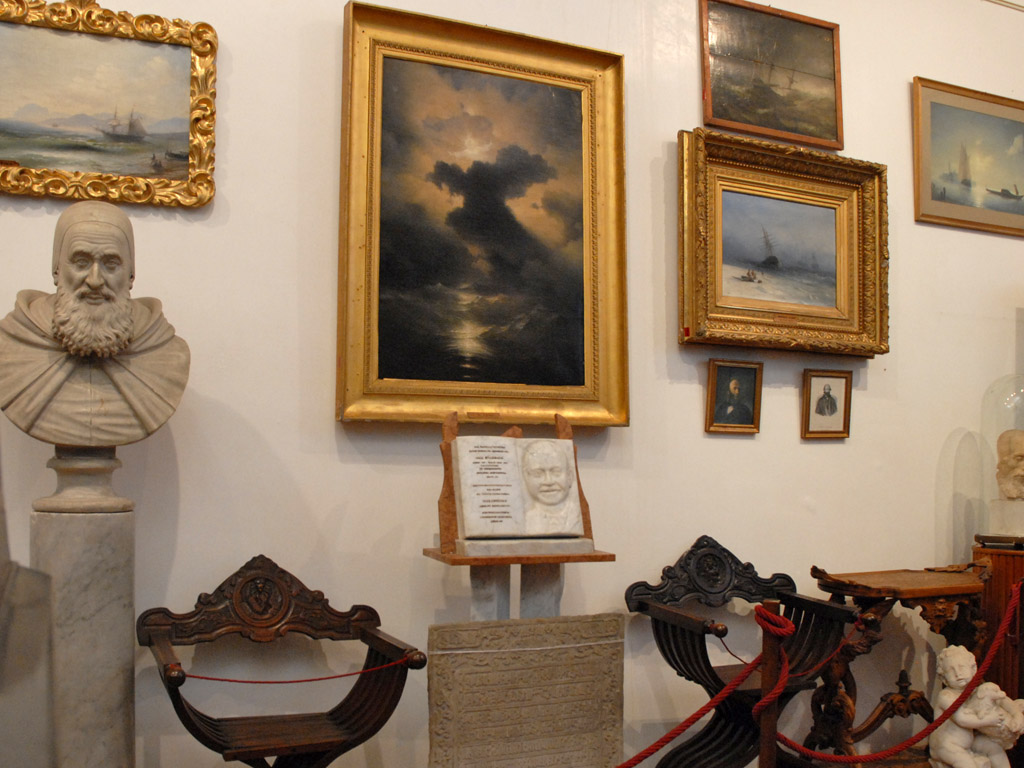
The Armenian museum. The painting in the middle is Ivan Aivazovsky's Chaos (1841).

The Armenian museum was designed by Venetian architect Giovanni Rossi and completed in 1867. Seriously damaged by a 1975 fire, it was restored in its present from by Manouk Manoukian. It formerly served as the library of Armenian manuscripts and publications. The museum now houses items related to Armenian history and art, inducing helmets and bronze belts from the Urartian period; the sword of Leo V, the last Armenian King of Cilicia, forged in Sis in 1366; Armenian ceramics from Kütahya; coins, stamps and a passport issued by the 1918–20 First Republic of Armenia. Numerous Armenian religious objects of art from the 16th to 18th centuries are on display. A bas-relief in agate from the medieval Armenian capital of Ani and a curtain formerly hang at the monastery of Lim Island on Lake Van are also on display, along with several paintings by Russian-Armenian marine artist Ivan Aivazovsky, including depictions of Mount Ararat and Niagara Falls. His Biblical creation-themed painting Chaos (1841) was donated to the congregation by Pope Leo XIII in 1901. The death mask of Komitas, the musicologist who established the Armenian national school of music, is also on display in the museum. Also on display is one of the most ancient swords ever found, made of arsenical bronze and originating from eastern Anatolia and dating to the early 3rd millennium BC.

=== Oriental museum ===
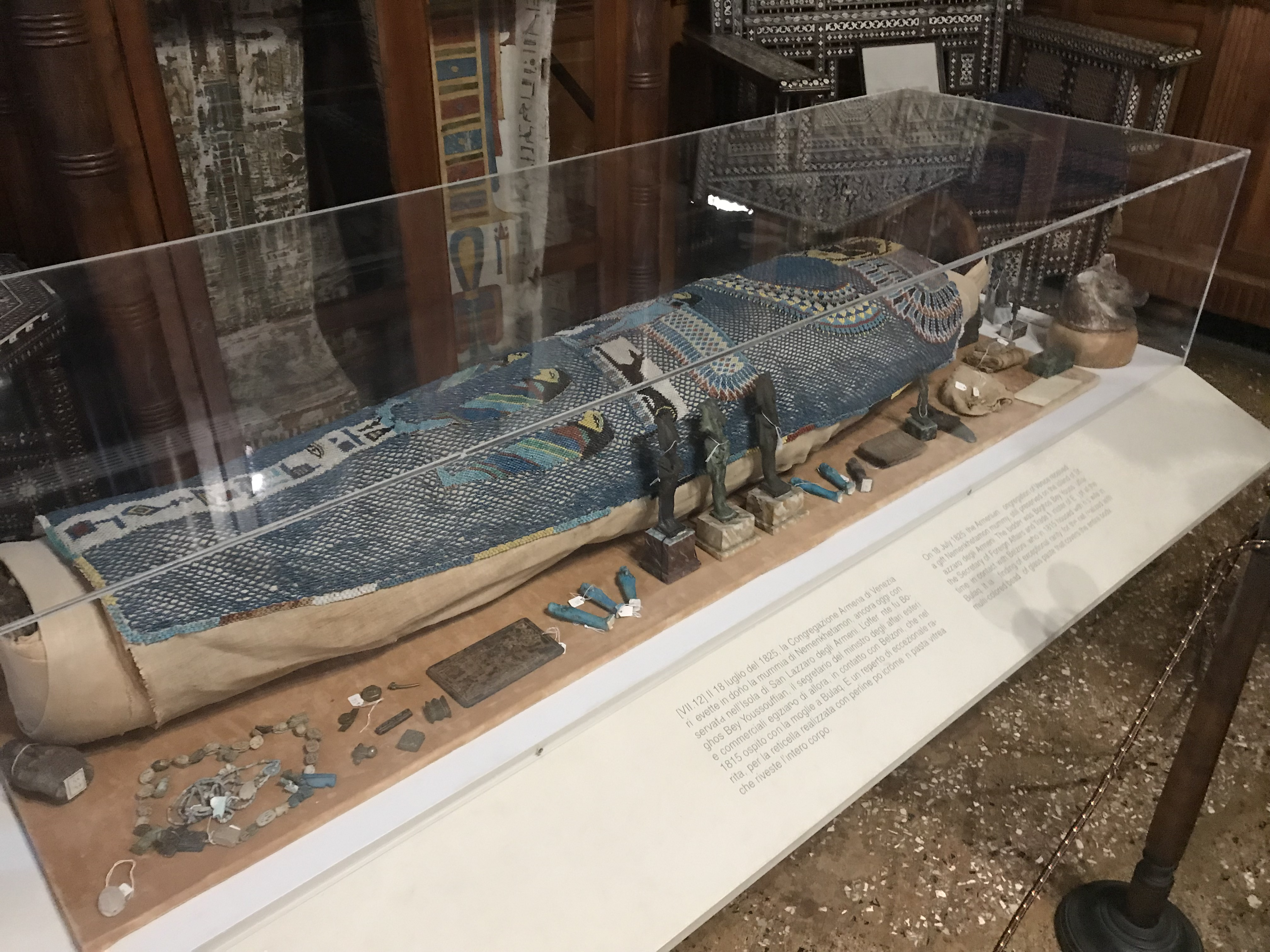
The Egyptian mummy

Oriental and Egyptian publications and artifacts are held in what is called the "Lord Byron Room", because it is where he studied Armenian language and culture during his visit to San Lazzaro. It was originally the manuscript room. Its most notable item is the Egyptian mummy, sent to San Lazzaro in 1825 by Boghos Bey Yusufian, an Egyptian minister of Armenian origin. It is attributed to Namenkhet Amun, a priest at the Amon Temple in Karnak, and has been radiocarbon dated to 450–430 BC (late period of ancient Egypt), following the international scientific mission led by Christian Tutundjian de Vartavan to study the mummy, as reported in 1995. The mission validated Herodotus' claim that cedar sawdust was used by Ancient Egyptians for embalming, as it fills the stomach of the priest.

The collection also includes Etruscan vases, Chinese antiques, a princely Indian throne with ivory inlay work, and a rare papyrus in 12 segments in Pali of a Buddhist ritual, with bustrophedic writing in red lacquer on gold leaf brought from Madras by a Russian-Armenian archaeologist, who discovered it in a temple in 1830.

=== Paintings ===
Among the art works on display at the monastery corridors are charcoal drawings by Edgar Chahine, landscapes by Martiros Saryan, Mount Ararat by Gevorg Bashinjaghian, a marine painting by Charles Garabed Atamian and a collage by Sergei Parajanov (gifted by himself), a triptych by Francesco Zugno depicting the baptism of King Tiridates III by Gregory the Illuminator, various paintings by Luigi Querena, Binding of Isaac by Francesco Hayez, and others.

== Publishing house ==
A publishing house was established at the island in 1789. It was closed down in 1991, however, the Mekhitarists of San Lazzaro continue publication through their publishing house, Casa Editrice Armena. Until the early 20th century, a number of important publications were made on the island. Khachig Tölölyan wrote of the role the Mekhitarists and their publications:

With astonishing foresight and energy, the scholar-monks of this diasporic enclave set out to accomplish what [Armenian scholar Marc Nichanian] has described as a totalizing project, a cultural program of research and publication that imagined Armenian life and culture as lamentably fragmented, and launched an effort to equip both the deprived homeland population and the artisans and merchants of the diaspora with the wherewithal of a national culture on the European model.

The publications of the Mekhitarists, both in San Lazzaro and Vienna, contributed greatly to the refinement of literary Western Armenian. The San Lazzaro branch became particularly noted in the fields of history, the arts, and literature influenced by the Italian penchant for the arts. The publishing house printed books in dozens of languages, which included themes such as theology, history, linguistics, literature, natural sciences, and economics. They also published textbooks and translations from European languages and editions of classics.

=== Significant publications ===
Among its publications, the most significant work is the two-volume dictionary of Classical Armenian: Բառգիրք Հայկազեան Լեզուի Baṛgirkʻ haykazean lezui (Dictionary of the Armenian Language, 1749–69), which made Armenian the sixth language (after Latin, Greek, French, Italian, and Spanish) to have such a complete dictionary. Its expanded and improved edition, Նոր Բառգիրք Հայկազեան Լեզուի, Nor baṛgirkʻ haykazean lezui (New Dictionary of the Armenian Language, 1836–37), is considered a monumental achievement and remains unsurpassed. Patrick Considine described the Nor baṛgirkʻ as the "only really useful dictionary" for work on the vocabulary of Classical Armenian (with the exception of Hrachia Acharian's etymological dictionary). He called it a "remarkable work of scholarship in its day and although as a tool of etymological research nearly a hundred and fifty years later it has obvious disadvantages, we should still be lost without it."

Mikayel Chamchian published the first modern history of Armenia in three volumes (1781–86). Ronald Grigor Suny argues that these publications laid the foundations for the emergence of secular Armenian nationalism.

Since 1800, a periodical journal has been published at the island. Bazmavēp (Pazmaveb), a literary, historical and scientific journal, was established in 1843 and continues to be published to this day.

== Role in Armenian history ==
In foreign waters, an island I behold,
The ancient Armenian light is renewed in you.
I know you toil, from age to age,
For the homeland, outside the homeland's embrace.

— Hovhannes Shiraz's poem on San Lazzaro

San Lazzaro has a great historical significance to Armenians and has been described as a "little Armenia." Called "a fragment of their lost homeland", it is one of the richest Armenian enclaves, and one of the best-known Armenian sites in the world, along with Jerusalem's Armenian Quarter. It is also considered "especially remarkable" of the religious orders based in Venice and "one of the most attractive corners of the lagoon."

William Dean Howells noted in 1866 that it is "famed throughout the Armenian world." It has been called the "centre of Armenian civilization" and "the most important Armenian settlement outside Armenia". American Protestant missionary Eli Smith noted in 1833 that the convent of San Lazzaro not only did not pursue the "denationalizing system of many of the Romish missions among the oriental churches," but also has done "more than all other Armenians together, to cultivate and enrich the literature of the nation." Louisa Stuart Costello called the Armenian convent of San Lazzaro "a respectable pile, above the encircling waters, an enduring monument of successful perseverance in a good cause."

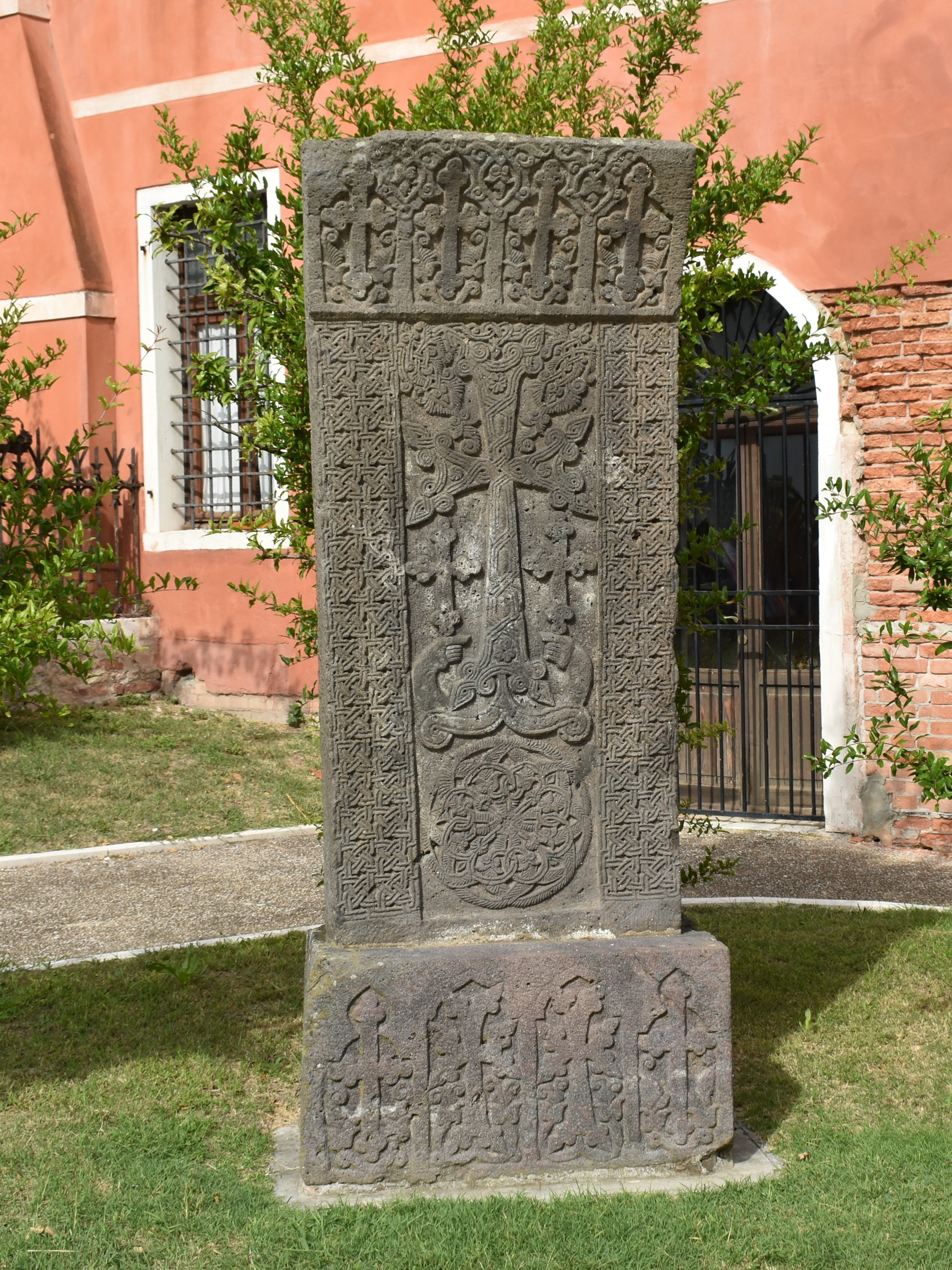
A 14th century khachkar at San Lazzaro

=== Cultural awakening ===
According to Robert H. Hewsen for nearly a century—until the establishment of the Lazarev Institute in Moscow in 1815—the monastery of San Lazzaro was the only center of intensive Armenian cultural activity that held the heritage of the Armenian people. During the 18th century, the rediscovery of classical Armenian literature and the creation of an Armenian vernacular by the Mechitarists of San Lazzaro was a key factor in the "Armenian Renaissance." Italian scholar Matteo Miele compared the work of the Mekhitarists carried out in the island to the work of the humanists, painters and sculptors of the Italian Renaissance. For over a century the monastery of San Lazzaro became the "potent agency for the advancement of secular, as well as of religious, knowledge" with "avowed religious, educational, and literary objectives like those of the medieval Benedictine order."

National consciousness and nationalism

The activities of the island monastery, which became a center for Armenian studies, led to a revival of Armenian national consciousness. According to Harry Jewell Sarkiss the emphasis Mekhitarists of San Lazzaro put on "their national history and language was significant, for thereby they planted the seeds" of modern Armenian nationalism. Elizabeth Redgate writes that the developments in intellectual culture and scholarship in Russian Armenia and at the Mkhitarist monasteries of San Lazzaro and Vienna inspired an increased nationalism among Armenians in the 1880s. Mary Tarzian suggests that nationalism among Armenians in the Ottoman Empire emerged from the educational vision of the Mechitarists in San Lazzaro. This view was expressed as early as 1877 when Charles Yriarte wrote that the Armenians "look with justice upon the island of San Lazzaro as the torch which shall one day illuminate Armenia, when the hour comes for her to live again in history and to take her place once more among free nations."

However, their activities were not without criticism. Mikael Nalbandian, a liberal and anti-clerical Russian-Armenian writer, wrote in the mid-19th century that the "enlightenment of our nation must proceed from the hands of execrable papist monks! Their 'light' is far more pernicious than darkness."

== Notable resident scholars ==
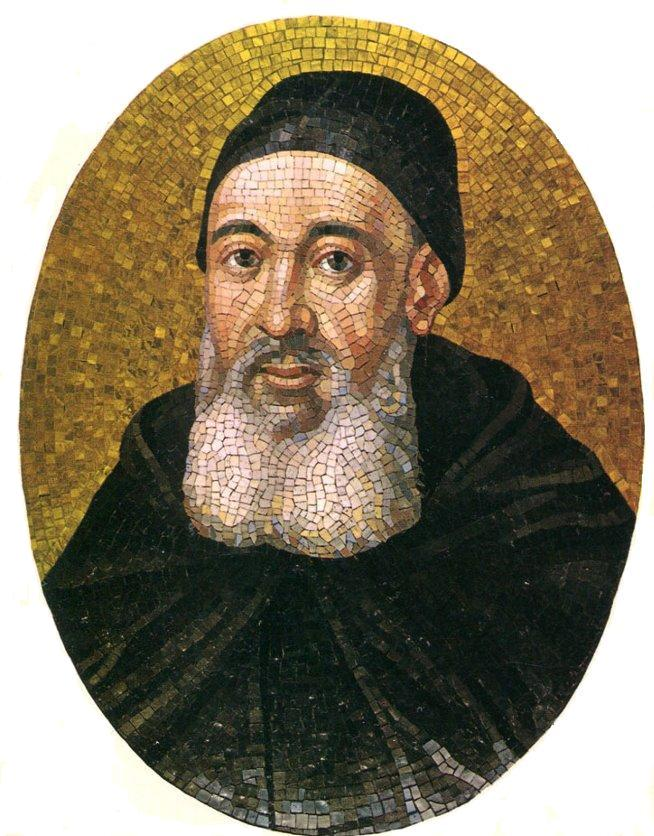
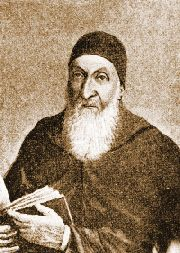
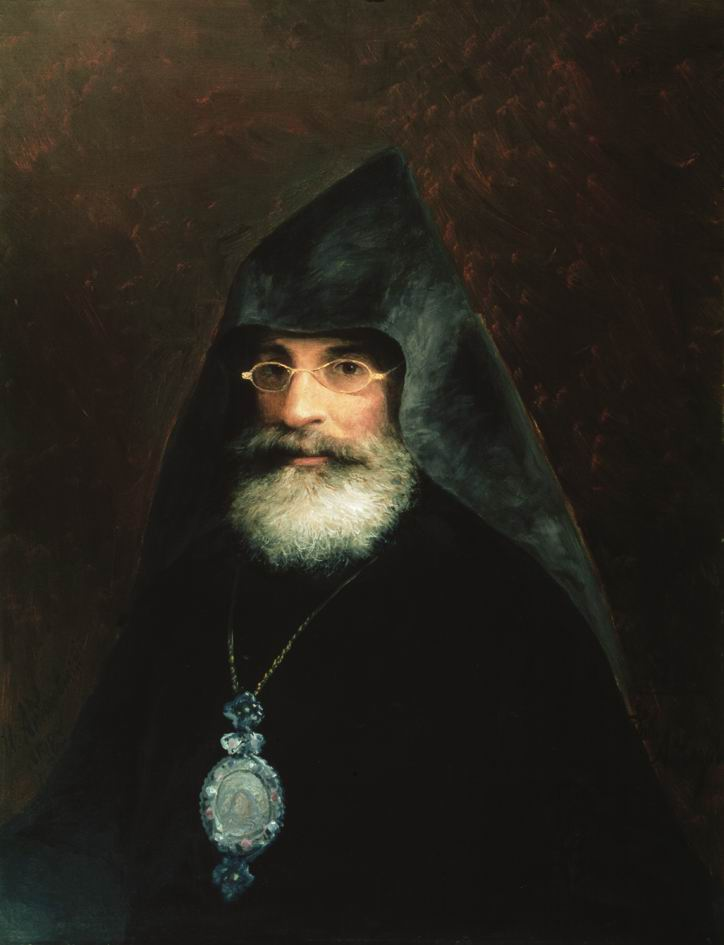
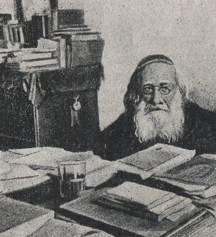
Mkhitar Sebastatsi (1676–1749)	The founder of the Mkhitarist (Mechitarist) Order. He resided in the island from the time of the settlement of his congregation in 1717 until his death. He set the foundations of modern philological studies of the Armenian language by publishing books on grammar and dictionaries. He published some 20 works, mostly on the subjects of theology and philosophy, including an Armenian edition of the Bible (1733), a commentary on the Gospel of Matthew (1737), Armenian grammar, dictionary, and catechism.
Mikayel Chamchian (1738–1823)	A historian who lived in the island from 1757 until his death. He authored the first modern history of Armenia, in three volumes (1781–86). It is a comprehensive and influential publication which was used as a reference work by scholars for over a century. According to Hacikyan et al. it is a "great achievement in Armenian historiography judging by the criteria of his own time."
Gabriel Aivazovsky (1812–1880)	A philologist, historian and publisher, whose younger brother, Ivan (Hovhannes) Aivazovsky, was a famed Russian seascape artist. He studied at the island school from 1826 to 1830 and was later the secretary of the Mekhitarian congregation. He founded and edited the San Lazzaro-based journal Bazmavēp from 1843 to 1848.
Ghevont Alishan (1820–1901)	A prominent historian, was a member of the Mechitarist Order since 1838. In 1849–51 he edited the journal Bazmavēp and taught at the monastic seminary in 1866–72. He lived in the island permanently from 1872 until his death in 1901. He authored books on the history and geography of Armenians regions of Shirak, Ayrarat, Sisakan (all published in 1881–83) with "amazing accuracy." In 1895 he published two notable works, one on pre-Christian polytheistic religion of Armenians and a study on 3,400 species of plants that grow in Armenia.

Others

- Ghoukas Indjidjian (1758—1833)
- Mkrtich Avgerian (1762—1854)
- Manuel Jakhjakhian (1770—1835)
- Arsen Bagratuni (1790—1866)
- Karekin Zarphanalian (1827—1901)
- Boghos Ananian (1922—1998)

== Notable students ==
- Gabriel Aivazovsky, Armenian archbishop
- Tserents, Armenian writer
- Hrant Maloyan, Syrian commander
- Alicia Terzian, Argentine musicologist

== Notable visitors ==
A wide range of notable individuals have visited the island through centuries.

=== Lord Byron ===
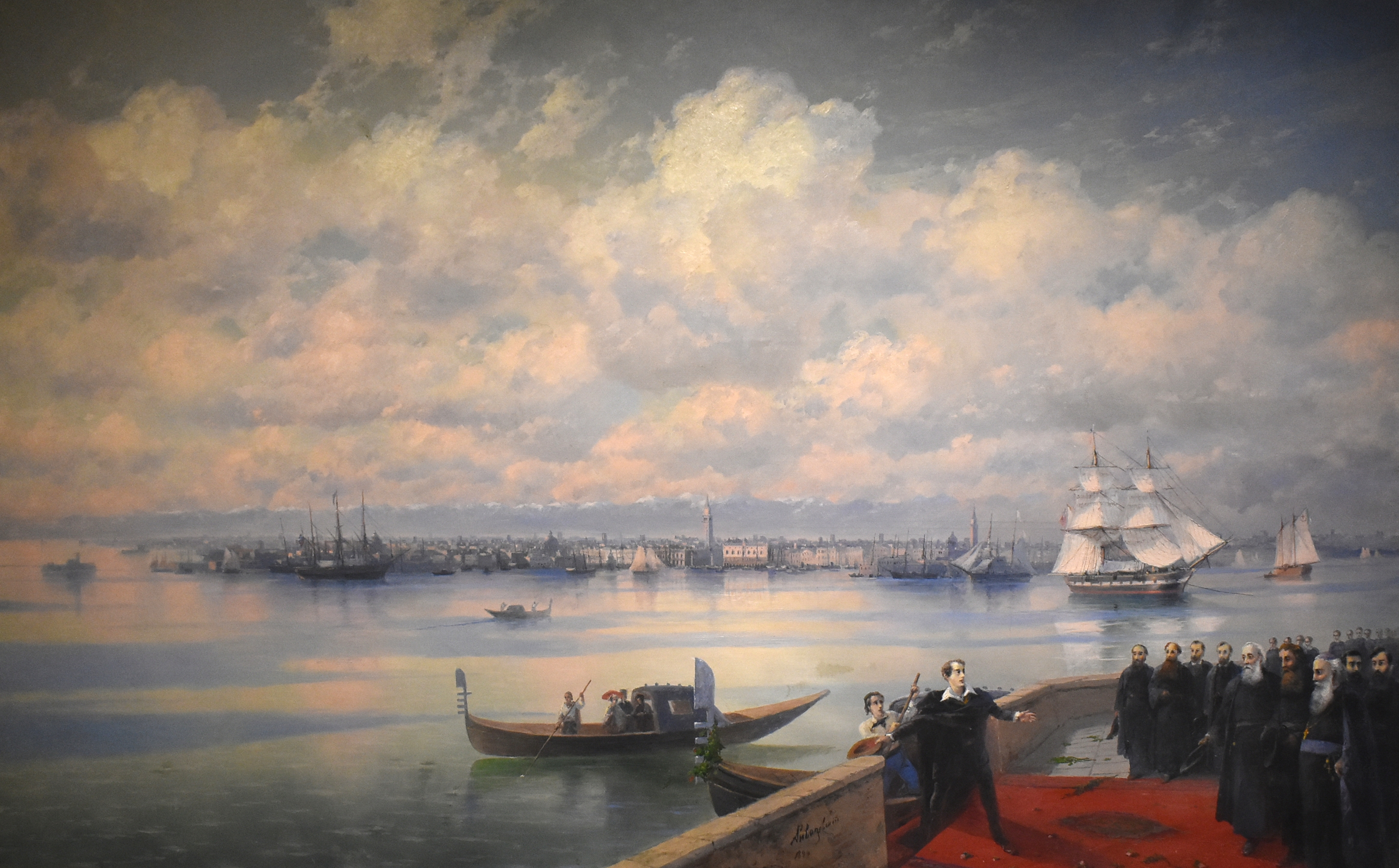
Lord Byron's visit to the island as pictured by Ivan Aivazovsky, 1899, National Gallery of Armenia

English Romantic poet Lord Byron visited the island from November 1816 to February 1817. He acquired enough Armenian to translate passages from Classical Armenian into English. He co-authored English Grammar and Armenian in 1817, and Armenian Grammar and English in 1819, where he included quotations from classical and modern Armenian. The room where Byron studied now bears his name and is cherished by the monks. There is also a plaque commemorating Byron's stay. Byron is considered the most prominent of all visitors of the island. James Morris wrote in 1960 that "many people in Venice, asked to think of San Lazzaro, think first of Byron, and only secondly of the Armenians. Byron's spirit haunts the island."

=== Non-Armenians ===
Pope Pius VII visited the island on May 9, 1800. Since the 19th century numerous notable individuals visited San Lazzaro, such as composers Jacques Offenbach, Gioachino Rossini, Pyotr Ilyich Tchaikovsky, and Richard Wagner (1859), writers Alfred de Musset and George Sand (1834), Rudyard Kipling, Marcel Proust (1900), Ivan Turgenev, Nikolai Gogol, Henry Wadsworth Longfellow, English polymath John Ruskin (early 1850s), and French historian Ernest Renan (1850).

During the 19th century numerous monarchs visited the island, including Charles IV of Spain, Franz Joseph I of Austria, Umberto I of Italy, Charles I of Romania, Wilhelmina of the Netherlands, Ludwig I of Bavaria, (1841), Margherita of Savoy, Maximilian I of Mexico, Carlota of Mexico, Edward VII, Prince of Wales and future British king (1861), Napoleon III (1862), Pedro II of Brazil (1871), Princess Louise, Duchess of Argyll (1881), Alexander I of Russia. U.S. President Ulysses S. Grant and British Prime Minister William Gladstone visited San Lazzaro in 1878 and 1879, respectively.

=== Armenians ===
San Lazzaro has attracted numerous Armenian figures, from men of arts and letters to religious and political leaders. The marine painter Ivan Aivazovsky visited San Lazzaro in 1840. He met his older brother, Gabriel, who was working at the monastery at that time. At the monastery library and the art gallery Aivazovsky familiarized himself with Armenian manuscripts and Armenian art in general. Another Armenian painter, Vardges Sureniants, visited San Lazzaro in 1881 to study Armenian miniatures. The ethnographer Yervand Lalayan spent six months in 1894 for research. The ethnomusicologist Komitas lectured on Armenian folk and sacred music and researched the Armenian music notation (khaz) system in the monastery library in July 1907. The prominent writer Avetik Isahakyan visited in 1901 to meet with Ghevont Alishan and frequently visited the monastery with Yeghishe Charents in 1924 during their time in Venice. The noted Soviet astrophysicist Viktor Ambartsumian, visiting in 1969, was declared an honorary member of its academy.

At least two catholicoi (leaders) of the Armenian Apostolic Church have visited the island: Vazgen I (1958 and 1970), and Karekin II (2008).

All leaders of Armenia have visited the island since independence, including Presidents Levon Ter-Petrosyan (1991), (Note: Ter-Petrosyan visited in January 1991, when Armenia had declared sovereignty, but formally became independent in September 1991. At the time of his visit Ter-Petrosyan was chairman of the Armenian Supreme Council and de facto leader of Armenia. He was elected president in October 1991.) Robert Kocharyan (2005), Serzh Sargsyan (2011), and Prime Minister Nikol Pashinyan (2019). Ter-Petrosyan was named a member of its academy in 1991.

== Artistic depictions ==
Numerous artists have painted the island, including

- Vignette of the Isola di S. Lazzaro degli Armeni by Antonio Visentini (d. 1782, undated), Royal Collection, Windsor Castle
- Island of Surb Ghazar at night by Gevorg Bashinjaghian (1892), National Gallery of Armenia
- San Lazzaro bei Venedig by Marie Egner (c. 1896)
- Byron's visit to the Mekhitarists in Surb Ghazar Island by Ivan Aivazovsky (1899), National Gallery of Armenia
- The Armenian Convent by Joseph Pennell (1905), Library of Congress Prints and Photographs Division
- Sb. Ghazar island, Venice by Hovhannes Zardaryan (1958), National Gallery of Armenia

== See also ==
- Mekhitarist Monastery, Vienna
- Armenians in Italy
- List of Armenian ethnic enclaves
- Santa Croce degli Armeni
- Armenian Catholic Church

== Bibliography ==
=== Books on San Lazzaro ===
- Peratoner, Alberto (2007; 2015). From Ararat to San Lazzaro. A Cradle of Armenian Spirituality and Culture in the Venice Lagoon. - Contributions by Fr. Vertanes Oulouhodjan and H.E. Boghos Levon Zekiyan. Venice: Congregazione Armena Mechitarista - Casa Editrice Armena.
- Issaverdenz, James (1890). The Island of San Lazzaro, Or, The Armenian Monastery Near Venice. Armenian typography of San Lazzaro.
- Langlois, Victor (1874). The Armenian Monastery of St. Lazarus-Venice. Venice: Typography of St. Lazarus.

=== Articles on San Lazzaro ===
- Russell, C. W. (May 1842). "The Armenian Convent of San Lazzaro, at Venice". The Dublin Review. 12: 362–386.
- Saryan, Levon A. (July–August 2011). "A Visit to San Lazzaro: An Armenian Island in the Heart of Europe". Armenian Weekly. Part I, Part II, Part III
- Shcherbakova, Vera (20 November 2014). "Таинственный "остров армян" [Mysterious "island of Armenians"]". Chastny Korrespondent (in Russian). via euromag.ru.
- "The Armenian Convent in Venice". The New York Times. 7 April 1878.

=== Other books ===
- Adalian, Rouben Paul (2010). Historical Dictionary of Armenia. Lanham, Maryland: Scarecrow Press. pp. 426–427. ISBN 978-0-8108-7450-3.
- Coulie, Bernard (2014). "Collections and Catalogues of Armenian Manuscripts". In Calzolari, Valentina (ed.). Armenian Philology in the Modern Era: From Manuscript to Digital Text. Brill Publishers. pp. 23–64. ISBN 978-90-04-25994-2.
- Hacikyan, Agop Jack; Basmajian, Gabriel; Franchuk, Edward S.; Ouzounian, Nourhan (2005). "The Mkhitarist (Mekhitarist) Order". The Heritage of Armenian Literature: From the eighteenth century to modern times. Detroit: Wayne State University Press. pp. 50–55. ISBN 978-0-8143-3221-4.
- Mackay, George Eric (1876). Lord Byron at the Armenian Convent. Venice: Office of the "Poliglotta".
- Morris, James (1960). The World of Venice. New York: Pantheon Books.
- Nurikhan, Minas (1915). The Life and Times of Abbot Mechitar. Rev. John Mc Quillan (translator). Venice: St. Lazarus's Island.
- Suny, Ronald Grigor (1993). Looking Toward Ararat: Armenia in Modern History. Bloomington: Indiana University Press. ISBN 978-0-253-20773-9.
- Yriarte, Charles (1880) [1877]. Venice: Its History, Art, Industries and Modern Life (Venise: l'histoire, l'art, l'industrie, la ville et la vie). Sitwell, F. J. (translator). New York: Scribner and Welford. pp. view=1up, seq=423 301–306.

=== Other articles ===
- Mesrobian, Arpena (1973). "Lord Byron at the Armenian Monastery on San Lazzaro". The Courier. 11 (1): 27–37.
- Sarkiss, Harry Jewell (December 1937). "The Armenian Renaissance, 1500–1863". The Journal of Modern History. 9 (4): 433–448. doi:10.1086/243464. JSTOR 1899203. S2CID 144117873.
