= Santa Croce degli Armeni =

Church in Venice, Italy

Coordinates: 45.4356°N 12.3378°E

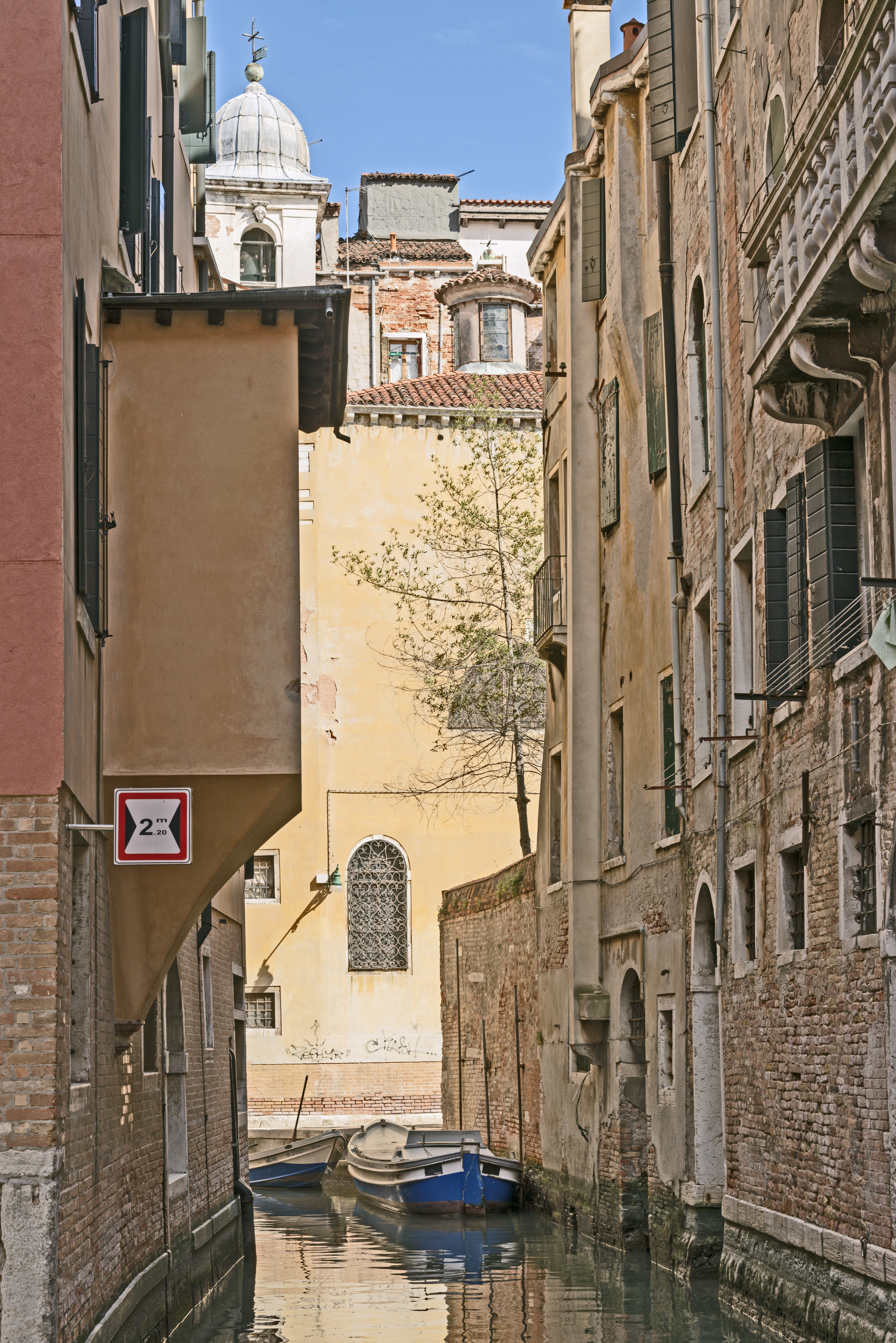
Viewed from Rio dei Ferai

Santa Croce degli Armeni or Holy Cross Armenian Church is a church in Venice, on Calle dei Armeni, near St Mark's Basilica. It is the national church of the Armenian community in Venice.

== History ==
The first contacts between Armenian merchants and Venetians go back to the 6th century. By the 12th century, the Armenian community was established in Venice. It became one of the Republic's wealthiest foreign communities.

In the middle of 13th century Venetian nobleman and doge Marco Zianni built a hospice for the Armenian merchants. An altar and chapel were erected in the territory in 1434. In 1688 merchant Guerek Mirmanian was granted permission to expand the chapel into a full-fledged church, which later became an important institution for the community.

Today the church is open for Mass one day a month. The priests from the San Lazzaro degli Armeni row over to Venice to celebrate mass at the church on the last Sunday of the month at 10:30 AM.
