= Victor Langlois =

French historian

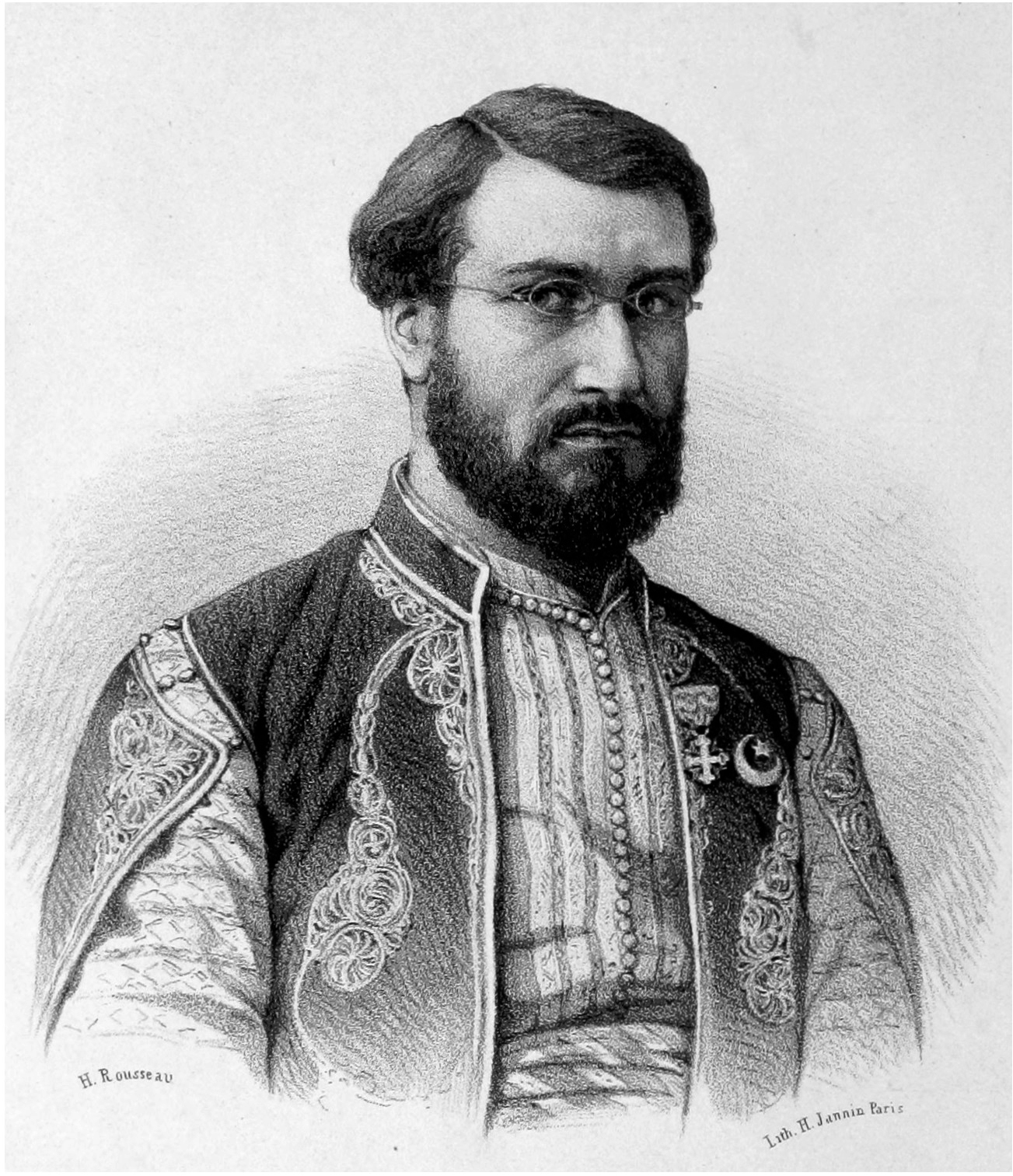
- Born: 20 March 1829; Dieppe, France
- Died: 14 May 1869 (aged 40); Paris, France
- Occupations: Historian, archaeologist, professor, numismatist, and orientalist

Signature
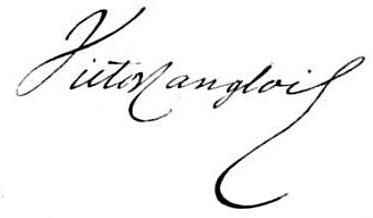

Victor Langlois (20 March 1829 – 14 May 1869) was a French historian, archaeologist, professor, numismatist, and orientalist who specialized in the study of the Middle Ages. Langlois was particularly known for his work on Armenian history and culture. He authored more than thirty books on Armenian history.

== Life and work ==
Victor Langlois was born on rue Sygogne in Dieppe, France on 20 March 1829. He was educated at the École Nationale des Chartes and Institut national des langues et civilisations orientales. On 7 May 1852, at the age of 23, he received orders from the French government to visit the predominantly Armenian populated area of Cilicia in the Ottoman Empire to carry out studies about historic French and Armenian relations. In particular, Langlois was tasked with studying Armenian-French relations during the Crusades, and to uncover archaeological findings. Remaining in Cilicia until 1853, Langlois published a book on his findings in 1861 entitled Voyage dans la Cilicie et dans les montagnes du Taurus (Travels in Cilicia and the Taurus Mountains). Terracotta figures which he had found in his excavations in the necropolis of Tarsus were exhibited in the Louvre.

Between the year 1857 and 1861, Langlois traveled in Italy in order to discover more historical information concerning the relations between France and Armenia during the Crusades. His other works relate to Egyptian and Georgian numismatics (1852), and to the convent of San Lazzaro degli Armeni of the Armenian Mekhitarist congregation, with an outline of Armenian history and literature (1862). During this time, in 1863, he published a book about the massacres of Armenians by Turks entitled Les Arméniens de la Turquie et les Massacres du Taurus (The Armenians of Turkey and the Taurus massacres). In 1867 he published Le mont Athos et ses monastères ("Mount Athos and its monasteries"), with a photo-lithographic reproduction of the geography of Ptolemy, of which the Greek manuscript of the 17th century is preserved in that monastery. He became a professor at the Collège de France in Paris. The first volume of his Collection des historiens anciens et modernes de l'Arménie, a translation from the Armenian language, was published in 1868, under the auspices of the Egyptian-Armenian prime minister Nubar Pasha, but he did not live to complete the work.

== Works ==
Some of Victor Langlois' published works include:

- Rapport sur l'exploration archéologique de la Cilicie et de la Petite-Arménie pendant les années 1852–1853 (1854)
- Essai historique et critique sur la constitution sociale et politique de l'Arménie sous les rois de la dynastie roupénienne (1860)
- Voyage dans la Cilicie et dans les montagnes du Taurus (1861)
- Étude sur les sources de l'Histoire d'Arménie de Moïse de Khorène (1861)
- Notice sur le couvent arménien de l'île Saint-Lazare de Venise (1863)
- Mémoire sur la vie et les écrits de Grégoire Magistros, duc de la Mésopotamie, auteur arménien du XIe siècle (1869)
- Collection des historiens anciens et modernes de l'Arménie (1869)
- Histoire des Arméniens (1880)
- Historicorum Graecorum et Syriorum reliquiae in Armeniorum scriptis servatae (1884)

== Gallery ==
Among Langlois' illustrations in his books concerning Armenian history include:

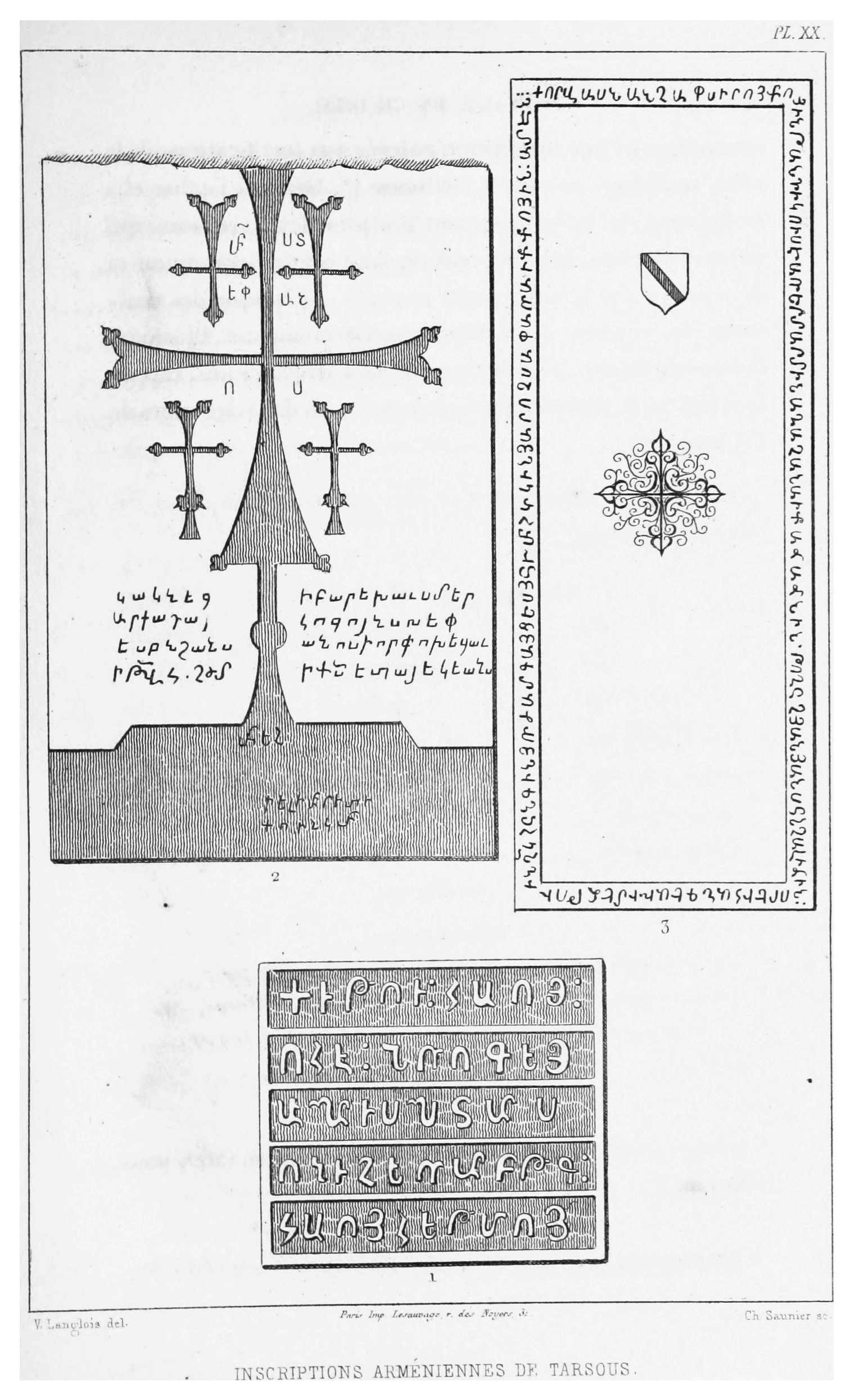
Armenian inscriptions in Tarsus

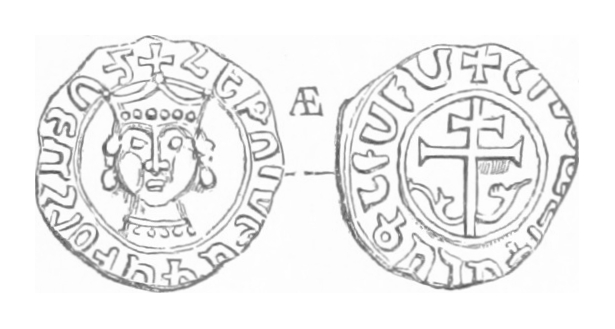
Coins from the reign of Hetoum II

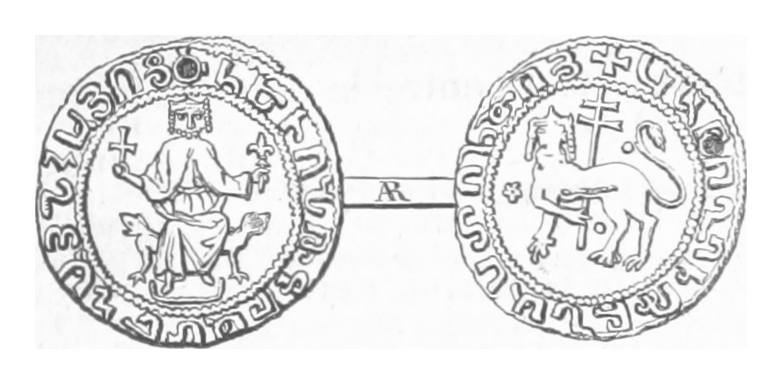
Coins from Leo II, King of Armenia's reign

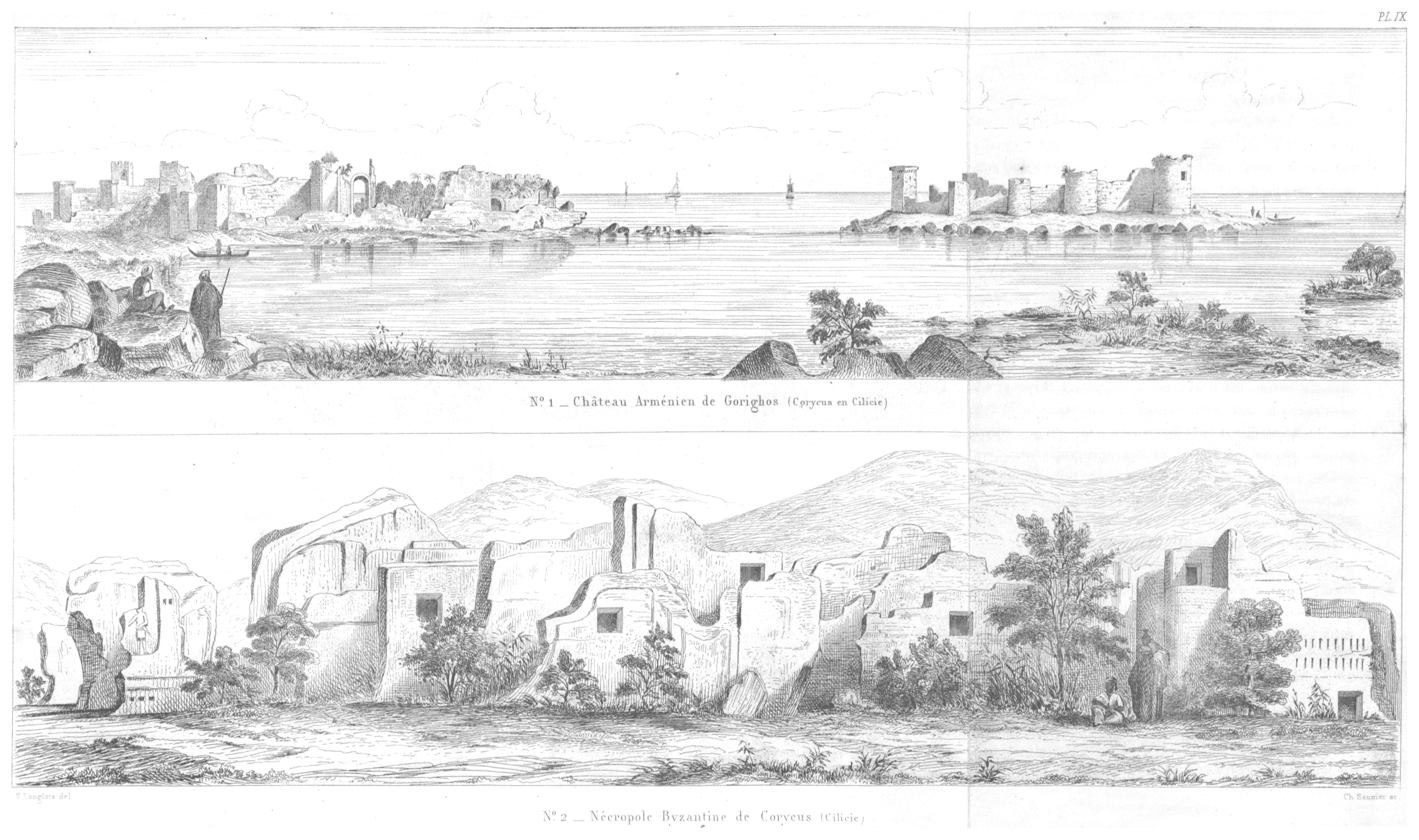
The Armenian castle of Corycus

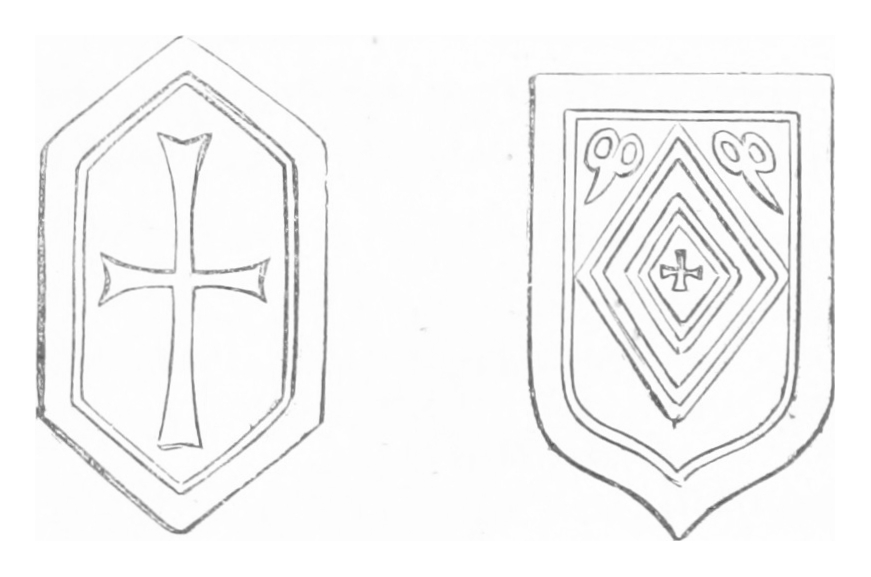
Inscriptions on the Armenian church in Tarsus

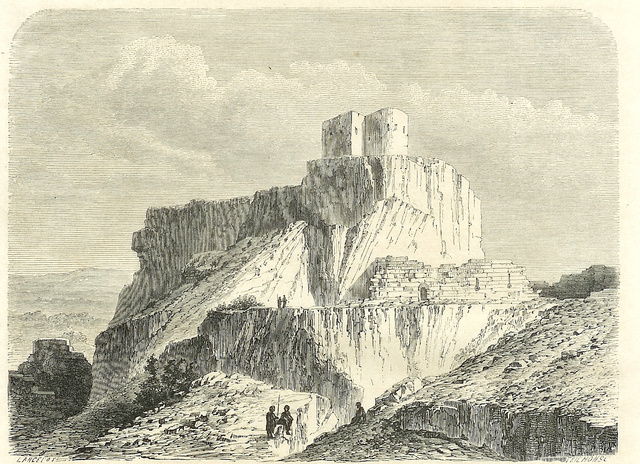
Armenian castle of Lampron
