= Francesco Zugno =

Italian painter

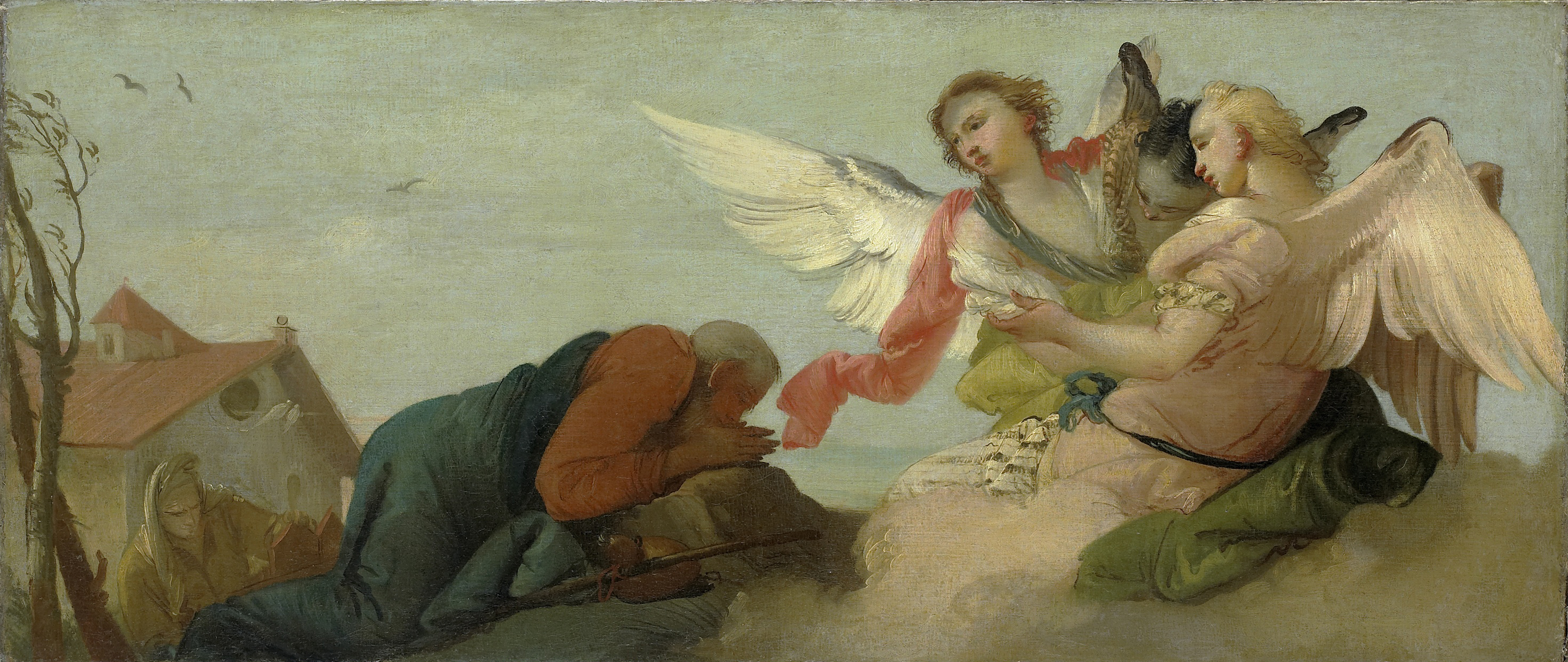
Abraham and the three angels

Francesco Zugno (Italian pronunciation: [franˈtʃesko dˈdzuɲɲo] c. 1708–1787) was an Italian painter of the Rococo period who had a successful career in Venice.

== Life ==
Francesco Zugno was born in Venice in 1709 and probably died there in 1787. The Zugno were an ancient Venetian family and its members included artists such as the fifteenth century painter Giambattista Zugno. The Brescia branch of the Zugno family also includes a Zugno Francesco (1574–1621) with whom the artist who is the subject of this entry is sometimes confused.

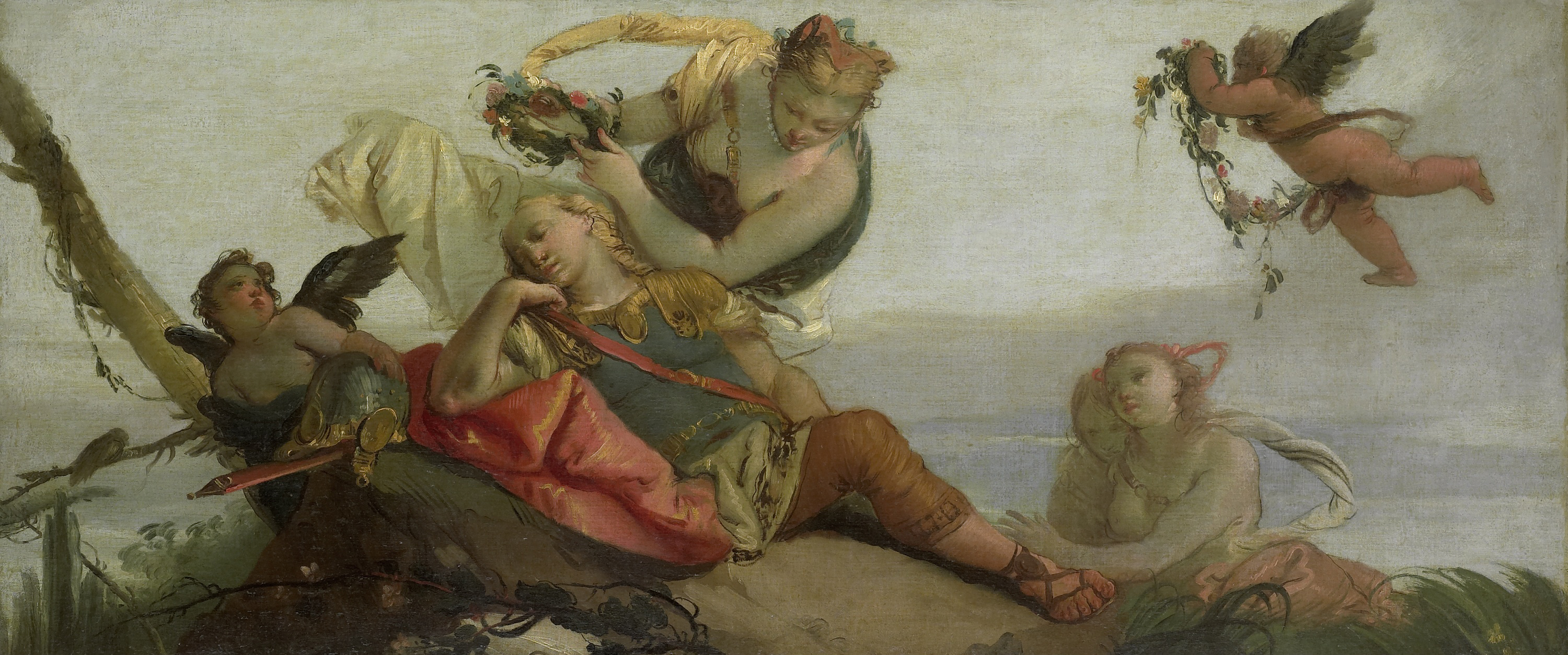
The sleeping Rinaldo crowned with a flower garland by Amida

Few details about his life are known. He trained at the Academy of Painting and Sculpture of Venice. When he entered, on the advice of his father Zugno Faustin, in the workshop of Giambattista Tiepolo around 1730, Francesco already had a solid training as a painter. As a disciple and collaborator of Tiepolo, he realized between 1730 and 1737 several paintings. Amongst others, he collaborated with Tiepolo on the frescoes for the Palazzo Labia. He received his first commission for paintings for the convent church of San Lazzaro degli Armeni in Venice.

Among his masterworks is a series of wall frescoes of figures in quadratura balconies, works that were part genre, part courtly conceit. He later completed a fresco cycle for the Villa Soderini-Berti, in Nervesa near Treviso. He was a founding academic of the Accademia of Venice.

He was married in 1742. The Venetian painter Alessandro Longhi, who knew him well, said Zugno was inclined to melancholy and loneliness.
