= Bazmavēp =

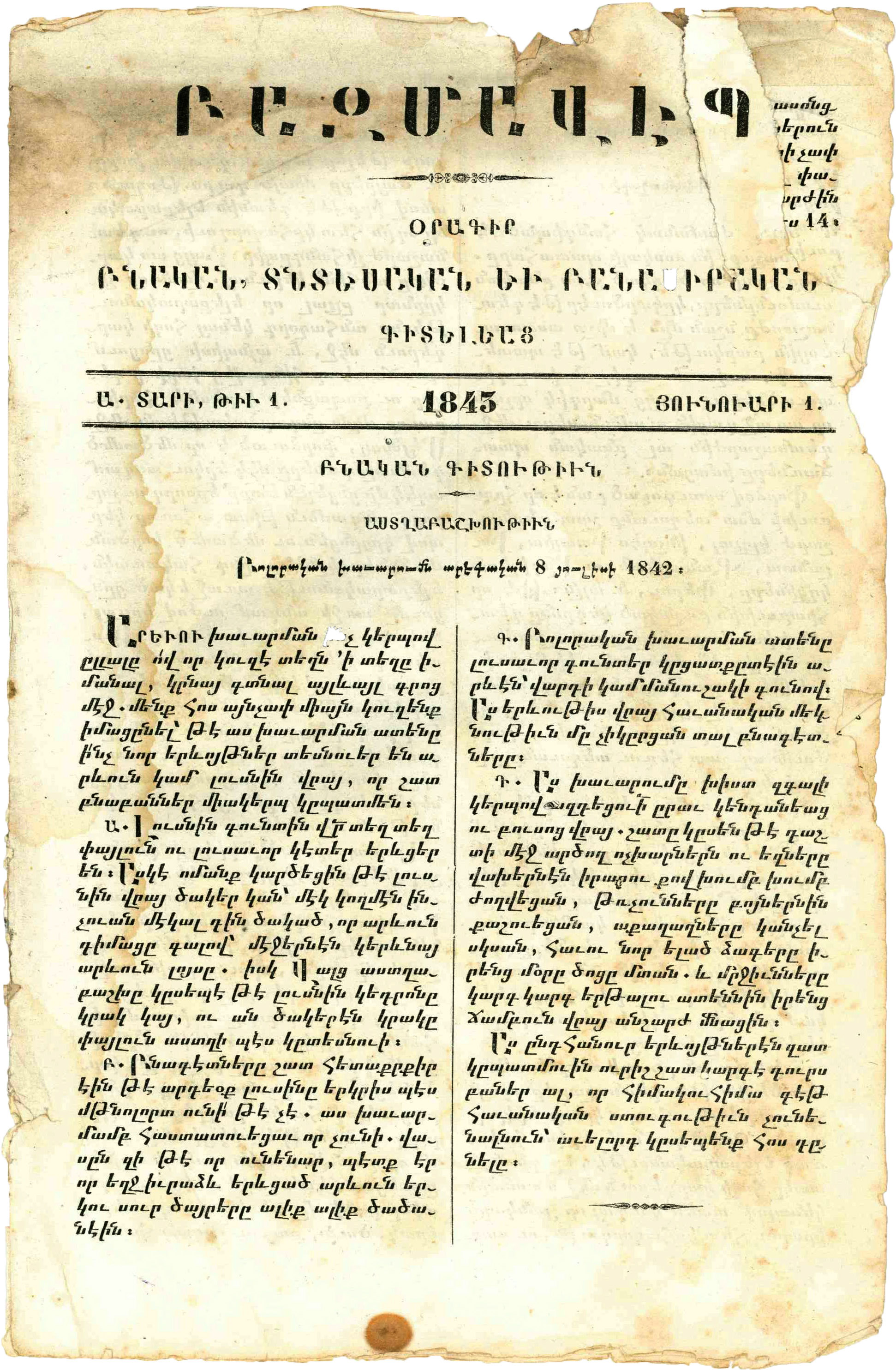
- Cover of the first issue
- Editor: Serop Chamurlian
- Frequency: Periodical (varying) presently biannual
- Publisher: Mekhitarist Order
- First issue: 1843-present
- Country: Italy
- Based in: San Lazzaro degli Armeni, Italy
- Language: Armenian
- Website: https://www.worldcat.org/title/bazmavep/oclc/5723743/

Bazmavēp (Pazmaveb in Western Armenian; Armenian: Բազմավէպ, "Polyhistory") is an academic journal covering Armenian studies. It is published by the Mechitarist monastery in San Lazzaro degli Armeni, Venice, Italy. According to Robert H. Hewsen, it is the first Armenian scholarly journal. and the longest-running Armenian publication still being published.

Bazmavēp was established by Gabriel Aivazovsky and Ghevond Alishan in May 1843, with the initial intention of publishing for three years. Previous editors-in-chief have been Gabriel Aivazovsky (1843–48) and Ghevont Alishan (1849-51). The current editor is Serop Chamurlian.

In its earliest decades, Bazmavēp was an economic-philological biweekly journal, aiming to convey enlightening ideas, useful tips, ways to revive economic, political and careful life to the readers. In the first period, the magazine was occupied by religious-moral programs, the latest discoveries in the fields of science and industry, information about geographical and archeological inventions, nature and the richness of the subsoil. In the 1860s, Bazmavēp became a scientific periodical, published the works of Armenian and foreign scholars, and contributed to the development of Armenology. Around the turn of the 20th century, Bazmavēp published numerous articles regarding the Armenian question and later the Armenian genocide. Today, the journal includes scientific, theological, Armenological, historical, linguistic, bibliographic, artistic, educational materials.

== Gallery ==
Cover of an issue of Bazmavēp (January 1925)

Cover of issue 1-2 (2013) of Bazmavēp
