= Gabriel Aivazovsky =

Armenian Catholic archbishop, scholar, educator, and historian (1812–1879)

- Գաբրիէլ Այվազեան
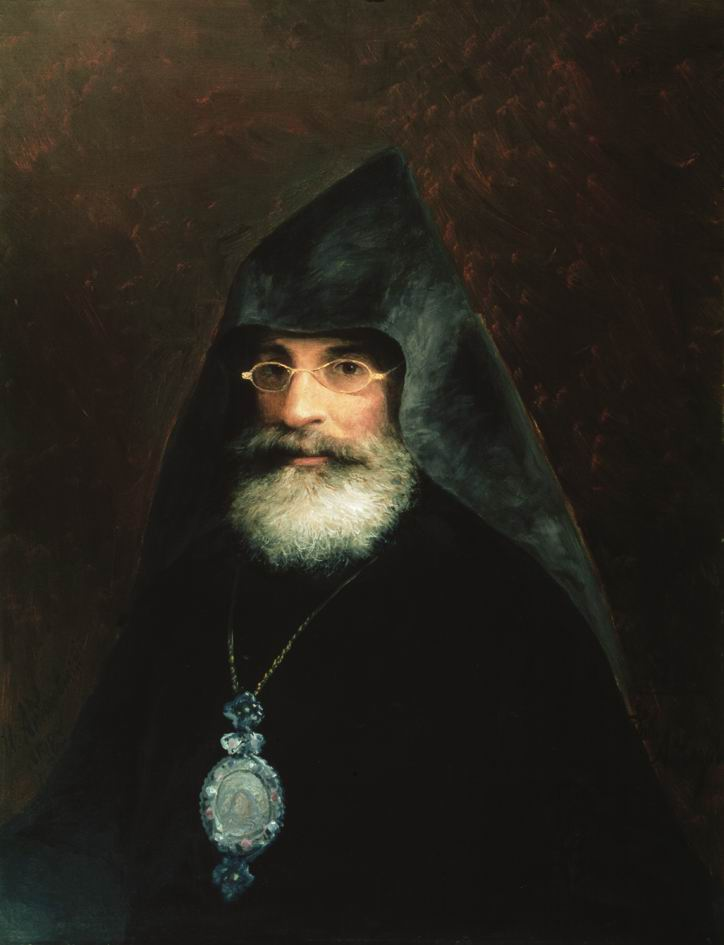
- Born: 22 May 1812; Feodosiya (Kafa), Taurida Governorate, Russian Empire
- Died: 20 April 1879 (aged 66); Tiflis, Tiflis Governorate, Russian Empire
- Occupations: Archbishop, scientist, writer, historian, educator
- Relatives: Ivan Aivazovsky (brother)

Gabriel Aivazovsky or Ayvazyan (Armenian: Գաբրիէլ Այվազեան, Russian: Гаврии́л Константи́нович Айвазо́вский; 22 May 1812 – 20 April 1879) was an Armenian Catholic archbishop, scholar, educator and historian. He was the elder brother of the artist Ivan Aivazovsky.

== Biography ==
Gabriel Aivazovsky was born in Feodosia into a family of Armenian merchants. He received a scientific education at the Mkhitarist Monastery on San Lazzaro Island in Venice. He was also a teacher of Oriental languages. In 1848, he was appointed a director of the Armenian College Samuel Moorat in Sèvres, and subsequently founded the same Armenian college. His most important works are "Essay on the History of Russia" (in Armenian, Venice, 1836), "History of the Ottoman State" (also in Armenian, 2 volumes, Venice, 1841). He was also one of the main staff of Paschal Aucher's (Harutiun Avgerian) Armenian dictionary. In 1843, he and Ghevont Alishan founded Bazmavep, the very first Armenian scholarly journal.

== See also ==
- Ivan Aivazovsky
- Armenians in Ukraine
  - Armenians in Crimea
