= Arsen Bagratuni =

Armenian scholar (1790–1866)

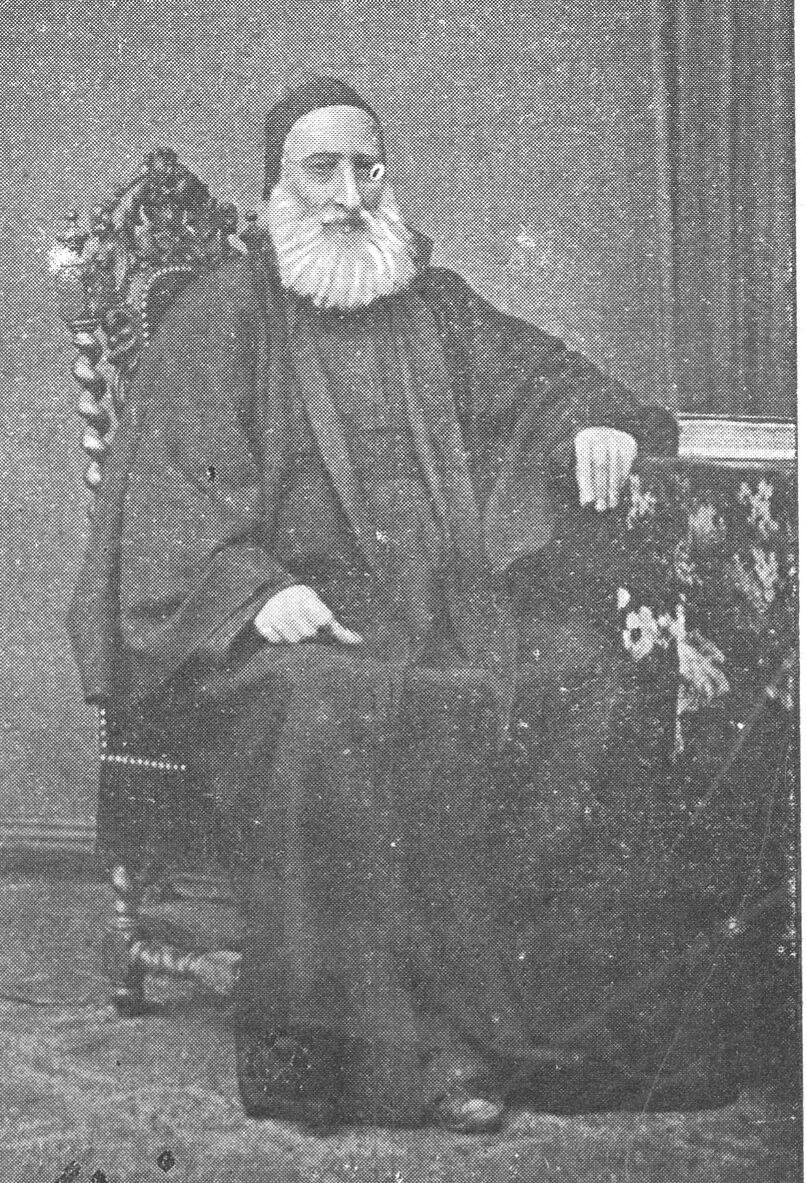
- Born: 21 August 1790; Constantinople, Ottoman Empire
- Died: 24 December 1866 (aged 76); San Lazzaro degli Armeni, Venice, Kingdom of Italy

Arsen Komitas Bagratuni (Armenian: Արսեն Կոմիտաս Բագրատունի, also spelled Pakraduni; 21 August 1790 – 24 December 1866) was an Armenian poet, scholar and translator. He was a member of the Mekhitarist Armenian Catholic order. He is regarded as the greatest representative of classicism in Armenian literary history and is best known for his epic poem Hayk Diwtsazn.

== Biography ==
Arsen Bagratuni, whose real surname was Antimosian, was born on 21 August 1790 into an Armenian family in Constantinople. In 1801, he began attending the school in Venice run by the Mekhitarists, an Armenian Catholic monastic order based on the island of San Lazzaro degli Armeni by Venice. He joined the order in 1810. Like all the Mekhitarists, he mastered Classical Armenian at an early age and studied Armenian literature. He also learned Greek, Latin, French, and Italian. After traveling to Paris, Rome and Russia, he became the chaplain of the Duzians, a notable Armenian family in Constantinople, in 1831. He returned to San Lazzaro in 1856 and remained there until his death on 24 December 1866. Besides his activities as a writer and scholar, Bagratuni was also a teacher; among his students were the poets Mkrtich Beshiktashlian and Ghevont Alishan (also a Mekhitarist priest and scholar).

== Literary career ==
=== Original works ===
Bagratuni has been called the best Mekhitarist poet and the greatest representative of classicism in Armenian literature. He wrote his works in Classical Armenian and strongly insisted on its continued use as the Armenian literary language, as opposed to the vernacular. In his early career (in the 1820s and '30s), he wrote poems on various themes and oratorios, which were probably performed at the Mekhitarist school. These poems followed the principles of the Italian classicist poets, especially Pietro Metastasio. They are filled with religious and moralistic themes. His oeuvre contains many occasional poems, as well as two plays which were published after his death. A collection of his poems was published in 1852. While Bagratuni's short poems have been highly praised, Manuk Abeghyan believed them to be overrated and described what he considered to be their flaws. Bagratuni has been described as superior to the other Mekhitarist poets in his thinking and poetic skills but still a "victim of classicist strictures and forced rhyme" like them. Samvel Muradyan states that Bagratuni's writing of occasional poems, rather than poems on topics of immediate relevance to contemporary Armenian life, meant that his poems never gained public significance.

Bagratuni's magnum opus is the epic poem Hayk Diwtsazn, written in 1830 and published in 1858. At more than 22,000 lines, it may be the longest poem ever written in Armenian. The poem is based on the legend of Hayk, the legendary progenitor of the Armenian people. Bagratuni greatly elaborated the legend into a complex plot with religious and patriotic themes. God selects Hayk to fight against the evil Bel, who demands that Hayk worship him as a god, accept his rule, and give him his daughter in marriage. Hayk rejects these demands and fights Bel. Christian and pre-Christian elements are combined in the poem: Hayk is aided by God, the biblical patriarchs, angels, etc., but also by the Armenian pagan goddess Astlik. After many battles, divisions within Hayk's camp, the death of Hayk's son, an unsuccessful attempt to kill the hero, and many other events, God temporarily abandons Hayk's side. However, Noah intercedes with prayers, allowing Hayk to defeat Bel. Prior to this, the wounded Hayk sees a vision of the future events of Armenian history, from the invention of the Armenian alphabet down to the time of the Mekhitarists.

In its form and structure, the work displays the influence of Homer, Virgil, Ovid, Torquato Tasso, John Milton, François-René de Chateaubriand, among others. The idea of the poem may have been inspired by the play of the same name by the Mekhitarist Yeghia Tomajian and Tesaran handisitsn Hayka, Arama yev Arayi by Hovhannes Vanandetsi, an older contemporary poet, but the plots of these works are not similar to that of Bagratuni's poem.

Hayk Diwtsazn is recognized as the greatest work of Armenian classicism. It has been praised for its excellent Classical Armenian, its successful combination of artistic and legendary elements, and its battle scenes. However, it was received with indifference upon publication. Kevork Bardakjian attributes this to the following factors:

First and foremost, very few Armenians could read Classical Armenian. Secondly, the religious-biblical aspects were so overwhelming that blending them with a decidedly heroic, pagan past turned the poem into a toyland where, in a sort of deus ex machina fashion, nothing moved without divine dispensation. This religious thrust did not resonate with the political aspirations of the Armenians; there was, for instance, no real threat to the faith of the Armenians at the time. Thirdly, the microcosm he created was not recognizably Armenian and seemed distant and unrelated to the Armenian ethos, past and present. Last but not least, the poem suffered from numerous technical flaws: protraction, harangues, and many an excursus in a frequently convoluted style.

=== Translations ===
Throughout his career, Bagratuni translated the works of many antique and modern European classicist authors into Classical Armenian. These included Homer (the Iliad), Sophocles (Oedipus Rex, Antigone, and Electra), Aeschylus, Demosthenes, Cicero, Virgil (the Eclogues), Milton (Paradise Lost), Voltaire, Racine, Pietro Metastasio, and Vittorio Alfieri.

== Scholarship ==
Bagratuni wrote a number of scholarly works, particularly in the fields of grammar and linguistics. His earliest work of scholarship is a grammar of the French language (Kerakanutiwn gaghghiakan, 1821), in which he covers French phonology, grammatical structure, morphology and syntax, as well as French poetic language and prosody. On the basis of his long study of Classical Armenian literature of the 5th–8th centuries (i.e., the earliest period of written Armenian literature), he wrote an Armenian grammar title Hayeren kerakanutiwn i pets zargatselots (Armenian grammar for the learned, 1852). In another work, Skzbunk ughigh khorhelo yev barvok kelo (Principles of thinking correctly and living well, 1857), he addressed general questions of linguistics, such as the nature, role, origin, and development of language. For pedagogical purposes, he also wrote a textbook of Classical Armenian in vernacular Armenian titled Tarerk hayeren kerakanutean, which went through eight editions between 1846 and 1875. Bagratuni participated in the critical reading of old Armenian manuscripts and the publication of old Armenian works such as those of Agathangelos, Eznik of Kolb, Movses Khorenatsi, and the Armenian versions of the Bible, Basil of Caesarea, and John Chrysostom. He also wrote on questions of philosophy and logic, following the teachings of Francis Bacon and empiricist thought.
