= Le Muséon =

- Discipline: Oriental studies
- Language: English, French, German, or Italian
- Edited by: Bernard Coulie

Publication details
- History: 1881–present
- Publisher: Peeters Publishers
- Frequency: Biannually

Standard abbreviations
- ISO 4: Muséon

Indexing
- ISSN: 0771-6494 (print); 1783-158X (web)

Links
- Journal homepage

Le Muséon: Revue d'Études Orientales (The Muséon: Journal of Oriental Studies) is a peer-reviewed academic journal of Linguistics and Oriental Studies. Established in 1881 by Charles de Harlez, it is subsidized by the government of Belgium and the Catholic University of Louvain. The journal is published biannually by Peeters Publishers and features articles in English, French, German, or Italian. The current editor-in-chief is Bernard Coulie.

== Abstracting and indexing ==
The journal is abstracted and indexed in the following databases:

- Arts & Humanities Citation Index
- Current Contents/Arts & Humanities
- MLA Directory of Periodicals
- ATLA Religion Database
- Index Islamicus
- Scopus
