= Charles Yriarte =

French writer and draughtsman

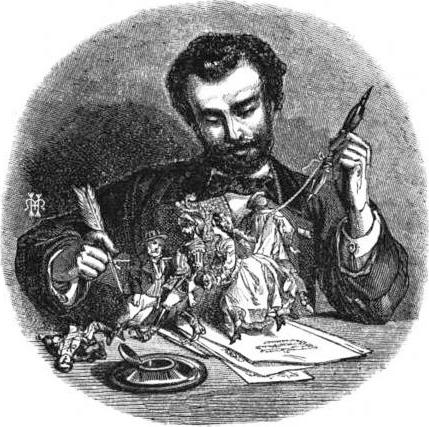
- Charles Yriarte, wood-engraving by Henri de Montaut (1864)
- Born: 5 December 1832; Paris
- Died: April 10, 1898 (aged 65); Paris
- Education: École des Beaux-Arts

Charles Yriarte (5 December 1832 in Paris – 10 April 1898 in Paris) was a French writer and draughtsman, although his family was originally from Spain.

== Life ==
He studied architecture in the École des Beaux-Arts and in 1856 became inspector of government buildings. Later, he joined the Spanish army as reporter for Le Monde Illustré during the Spanish campaign in Morocco. He travelled in Spain and Italy and became the magazine's editor after his return in 1862. In 1871, he quit his post to devote time to traveling, and his impressions were later used in his works. Some of his writings were published under the pseudonyms "Junior" and "Le Marquis de Villemer".

== On his work ==
In his work titled "Goya: sa biographie, les fresques, les toiles, les tapisseries, les eaux-fortes et le catalogue de l'oeuvre avec cinquante planches inédites d'après les copies de Tabar," Yriarte endeavored to offer a fresh interpretation of Francisco Goya's artworks during his lifetime, particularly focusing on 'Los Desastres' – Goya's etchings depicting the Franco-Spanish civil war. Yriarte challenged the prevailing notion that Goya's political canvases were mere depictions of 'facts' or specific events grounded in Verism. Instead, he contended that these works represented 'general ideas, analogies, sometimes true, always believable compositions' (Yriate apud Luxemburg 1998). Through Goya's deliberate placement of figures without heroic actions, immersed in a dream-like atmosphere of defeat, fear, and suffering, the painter skeptically conveyed a political perspective on life.

== Works ==
- La Société espagnole (Par. 1861)
- Sous la tente, souvenir du Maroc (1862)
- Les Célébrités de la rue (1864)
- Paris grotesque, les célébrités de la rue 1815-63 (2. Ed. 1868)
- Les Cercles de Paris, 1828-64 (1865)
- Portraits parisiens (1865)
- Nouveaux portraits parisiens (1869)
- Goya, sa vie, son œuvre (1867)
- Portraits cosmopolites (1870)
- Tableaux de la guerre (1870)
- Les Prussiens à Paris et le 18 mars (1871)
- Campagne de France 1870-71 (1871)
- Les Princes d'Orléans (1872)
- Le Puritain (1873)
- L'Istrie et la Dalmatie (1874)
- Trieste e l'Istria (1875)
- La Bosnie et l'Herzégovine pendant l'insurrection (1875)
- Bosnie et Herzégovine: souvenirs de voyage pendant l'insurrection (1876)
- Venise: l'histoire, l'art, l'industrie, la ville et la vie (1877)
- Les Bords de l'Adriatique (1878)
- Florence (1880)
- Un condottiere au XV. siecle: Rimini (1882)
- Françoise de Rimini (1882)
- La vie d'un patricien de Venise au XVI. siècle (von der Akademie gekrönt, 2. Ed. 1885)
- Matteo Civitali, sa vie et son œuvre (1885)
- Paul Véronèse (1888)
- Cesar Borgia (1889) 2 Vols.
- Les Fleurs et les jardins de Paris (1893)
- Mantegna (1901)
