= Bernard Coulie =

Belgian academic (born 1959)

Bernard Coulie (born 1959) is a Belgian academic specializing in Greek patristic literature primarily of Late Antiquity and its derivatives (hence an expertise in translation techniques) and counterparts in eastern Christian oriental languages of that period (notably Armenian, Syriac and Georgian). A dominant interest has been the work of Gregory of Nazianzus (Gregory the Theologian) and he has been closely associated since the 1980s with the NAZIANZOS project of the University of Louvain (UCLouvain) which he has directed for approximately a quarter of a century. Many of his contributions are detailed in the Publications section of the NAZIANZOS site. He has notably undertaken the editorship of volumes of the Corpus Nazianzenum series in Corpus Christianorum, Series Graeca (published by Brepols). This has involved Coulie in co-operation with the computerized CETEDOC editions. He has published work jointly with Georgian and Armenian scholars.

Coulie's initial university studies were at Louvain, Harvard and Vienna.

Coulie is a member of the councils of several academic and comparable institutions, e.g. he is president of the Conseil d'administration of the Fondation Nubar Pasha - Oeuvre des Boursiers armeniens. (A fuller list can be seen in his French language Wikipedia entry).

Coulie is currently editor of the academic journal, Le Muséon.

Coulie was president of the academic corps of the University of Louvain (UCLouvain) in 1998. He was the third lay person to serve as Rector of the UCLouvain (2004–2009).

== Works ==
- (ed.) Versiones Orientales, repertorium Ibericum et studia ad editiones curandas (Corpus Christianorum, Series Graeca
- Sancti Gregorii Nazianzeni opera, Versio Armeniaca 1, Orationes ii, xii, ix (Corpus Christianorum, Series Graeca, 28, Corpus Nazianzenum 3, Brepols, Turnhout 1994
- (with L. SHERRY & CETEDOC) Thesaurus Pseudo - Nonni quondam Panopolitani, Paraphrasis Evangelii S. Ioannis (Corpus Christianorum, Thesaurus Patrum Graecorum), Brepols, Turnhout 1995
- New Testament Quotations & Textual Criticism in the Armenian version of Gregory of Nazianzus, in S.AJAMIAN & M.E. STONE ed. Text and Context, Studies in the Armenian New Testament. Papers presented to the Conference on the Armenian New Testament, May 22–28, 1992, (University of Pennsylvania, Armenian Texts and Studies 13), Atlanta GA, Scholars Press, 1994,23-33
