= Anania Shirakatsi =

Pioneering 7th-century Armenian scientist

- Անանիա Շիրակացի
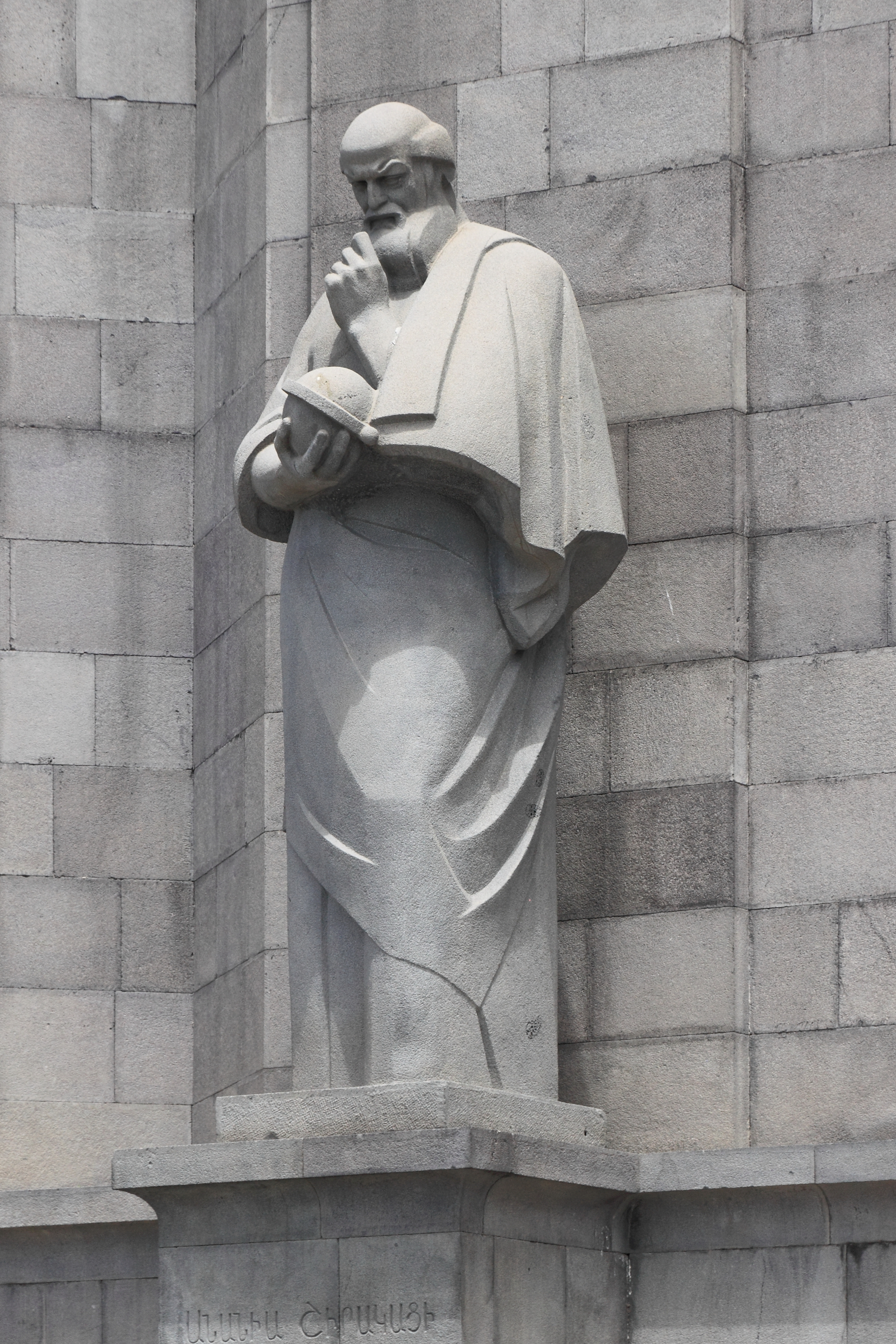
- 1963 statue of Anania Shirakatsi holding a globe at the entrance of the Matenadaran
- Born: c. 610; Shirak, Ayrarat, Sasanian Armenia
- Died: c. 685 (aged around 75); Arminiya

Philosophical work
- Era: Early Middle Ages
- School: Hellenizing School
- Main interests: Mathematics, astronomy, geography, chronology

Anania Shirakatsi (Old Armenian: Անանիա Շիրակացի, Anania Širakac’i, anglicized: Ananias of Shirak) was a 7th-century Armenian polymath and natural philosopher, author of extant works covering mathematics, astronomy, geography, chronology, and other fields. Little is known for certain of his life outside of his own writings, but he is considered the father of the exact and natural sciences in Armenia—the first Armenian mathematician, astronomer, and cosmographer.

A part of the Armenian Hellenizing School and one of the few secular scholars in medieval Armenia, Anania was educated primarily by Tychicus, in Trebizond. He composed science textbooks and the first known geographic work in classical Armenian (Ashkharhatsuyts), which provides detailed information about Greater Armenia, Persia and the Caucasus (Georgia and Caucasian Albania).

In mathematics, his accomplishments include the earliest known table of results of the four basic operations, the earliest known collection of recreational math puzzles and problems, and the earliest book of math problems in Armenian. He also devised a system of mathematical notation based on the Armenian alphabet, although he was the only writer known to have used it.

== Name ==
His name is usually anglicized as Ananias of Shirak (Širak). Anania is the Armenian variant of the biblical name Ananias, itself the Greek version of the Hebrew Hananiah. The second part of his name denotes his place of origin, the region of Shirak, though it may have become a sort of surname. In some manuscripts, he is called Shirakuni (Շիրակունի) and Shirakavants’i (Շիրակաւանցի).

== Life ==
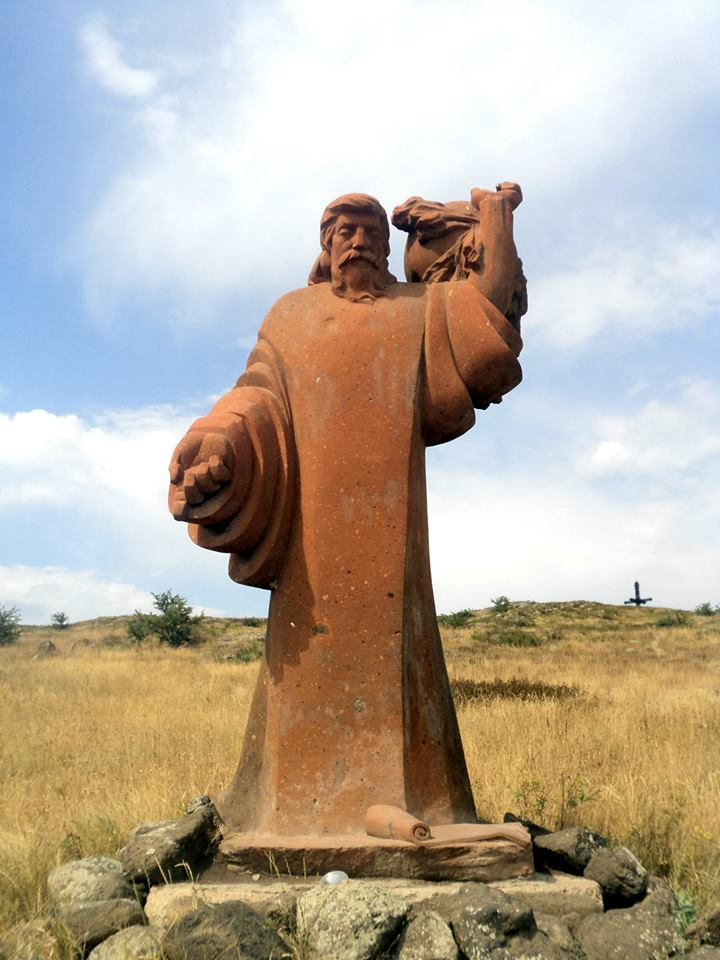
A statue of Anania at the Alphabet Park near Artashavan by Artush Papoyan (2005).

=== Background ===
Anania (Note: He will be referred to by this name throughout this article, as surnames were not widely used in Armenia at the time.) Shirakatsi lived in the 7th century. The dates of his birth and death have not been definitively established. Robert H. Hewsen noted in 1968 that Anania is widely believed to have been born between 595 and 600; a quarter-century later he settled on c. 610 as a birthdate and 685 as the year he died. Agop Jack Hacikyan et al. place his birth in early 600s but agree on 685. Sen Arevshatyan, James R. Russell, Edward G. Mathews, and Theo van Lint also concur with 610–685, while Greenwood suggests c. 600–670. Vardanyan places his death in the early 690s.

Anania is the only classical Armenian scholar to have written an autobiography. It is a brief text, characterized as "somewhat self-congratulatory" and "more a statement of academic pedigree" than autobiography. It was probably written as the preface to one of his scholarly works, possibly the K’nnikon. He was the son of Yovhannes and was born in the village of Anania/Aneank’ (Անեանք) or in the town of Shirakavan (Yerazgavors), in the canton of Shirak, in the central Armenian province of Ayrarat. Aneank' may be connected to the later city of Ani, the Bagratid Armenian capital.

Anania probably came from a noble family. Since his name is sometimes spelled as Shirakuni (Շիրակունի), Hewsen argued that he may have belonged to the house of the Kamsarakan or Arsharuni princes of Shirak and Arsharunik’, respectively. Greenwood suggests that it is more likely that Anania came from the lesser nobility in Shirak, who served the house of Kamsarakan. Broutian describes his father as a "minor Armenian nobleman." Vardanyan believes he either came from the Kamsarakan family or that they were his patrons.

Anania is traditionally thought to have been buried in the village of Anavank’; however, the tradition probably originated from the name of the village.

=== Education ===
Anania received his early education at the local Armenian schools, possibly at Dprevank’ monastery, where he studied sacred texts and earlier Armenian authors. Due to the lack of teachers and books in Armenia, he decided to travel to the Byzantine Empire to study mathematics. After first traveling to Theodosiopolis, then to the Byzantine-controlled province of Fourth Armenia (probably Martyropolis), where he studied under the mathematician Christosatur for six months. He then left to find a better teacher and learned about Tychicus, (Note: also transliterated as Tukhikos and Tykhikos; Greek: Τύχικος, Classical Armenian: Տիւքիկոս) who was based at the monastery (or martyrium) of Saint Eugenios in Trebizond. Redgate dated this to the 620s.

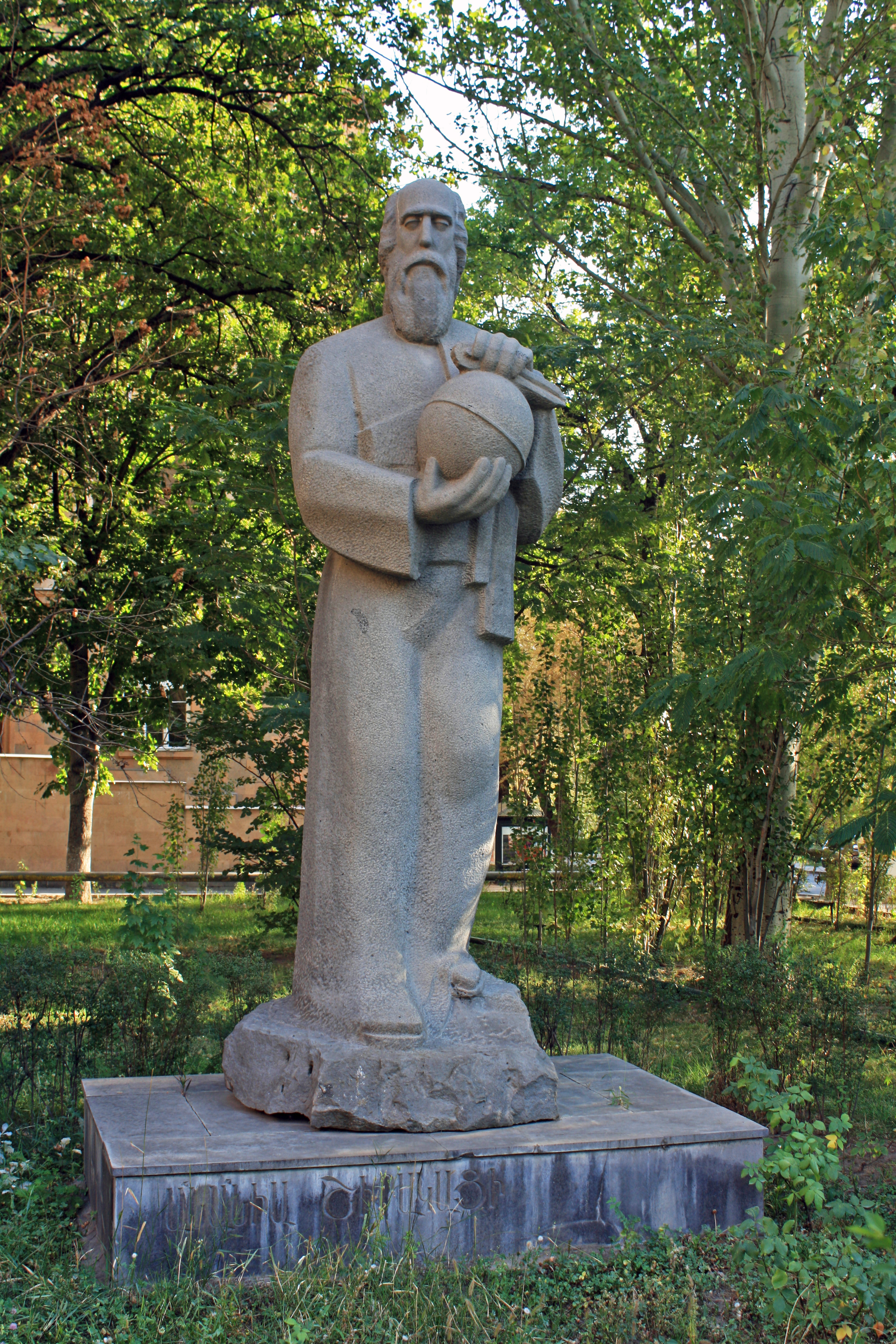
A statue of Anania at Yerevan State University

Anania devoted a significant part of his autobiography to Tychicus (born c. 560), with whom he spent eight years in the 620s or 630s. Tychicus had studied the Armenian language and its literature while serving in the Byzantine army in Armenia. Wounded by the Persians, he retired from the military and later studied in Alexandria, Rome, and Constantinople. Tychicus later returned to his native Trebizond, where he established a school c. 615. Tychicus taught many students from Constantinople (including from the imperial court) and was renowned among Byzantine kings. He provided Anania special attention and taught him what Anania called a "perfect knowledge of mathematics". In Tychicus's vast library, Anania found "everything, exoteric and esoteric", including sacred and secular Greek authors, including works on the sciences, medicine, chronology, and history. Russell believed his library may have included Pythagorean and alchemical books. Anania considered Tychicus to have been "predestined by God for the introduction of science into Armenia."

=== Educator and scientist ===
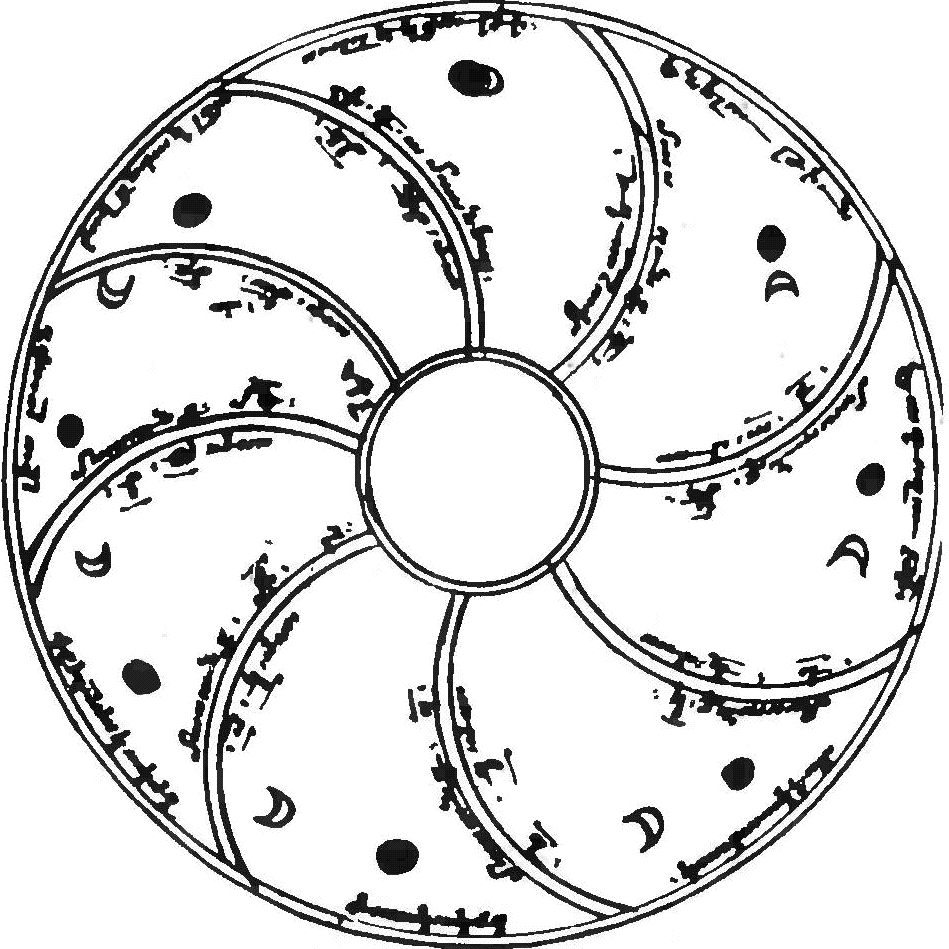
List of Moon Phases by Anania Shirakatsi

Anania himself established a school in Armenia upon his return. That school, the first in Armenia to teach quadrivium, is presumed to have been located in his native Shirak. He was disappointed with the laziness of his students and their departure after learning the basics. Anania complained about Armenians' lack of interest in mathematics, writing that they "love neither learning, nor knowledge." Nicholas Adontz considered it an exaggeration, "if not an absolute slander, to deny the Armenian innate love of investigation." The 12th-century chronicler Samuel of Ani listed five of Shirakatsi's students, who are otherwise unknown. Anania financed his research in several fields with the money he earned teaching.

== Relationship with the church ==
Thomson wrote that as a lay scholar, Anania was a "rarity in early Armenia." Hewsen termed him the only lay classical Armenian author besides Grigor Magistros, adding that he had a close relationship with the Armenian Church. (Note: Others do not consider him a secular scholar. Malachia Ormanian did not list him among lay authors. He wrote that among the fifty known writers between the 5th and 12th centuries, only Grigor Magistros and the physician Mkhitar Heratsi were laymen. Sen Arevshatyan called Grigor Magistros "the only secular philosopher in our entire medieval history.") Hacikyan et al. describe Anania as a "devout Christian and well versed in the Bible" who "made some attempts to reconcile science and Scripture." In his later years, Anania may have been a monk in the Armenian Church. This is based on his religious discourses and attempts to date the feasts of the church. John A. C. Greppin doubts that Anania was ever in any religious order. Several scholars consider him a church ideologist akin to Cosmas Indicopleustes, whom he actually criticized.

Hewsen noted that some of Anania's "more revolutionary ideas" were suppressed by the Armenian Church after his death. Greppin suggested that Anania, a largely secular author, had fallen into a "bad clerical odor." S. Peter Cowe disagreed with Ashot G. Abrahamian's hypothesis that his name was "censored in the Middle Ages because of ecclesiastical disapproval" and argued that it is "more applicable to Soviet practice than that of the relatively tolerant Armenian and other eastern churches." Soviet historians represented him as a founder of irreligious and anti-clerical thought in Armenia, who pioneered double-truth theory. Vazgen Chaloyan called him a "progressive representative of the feudal period of Armenian science." Gevorg Khrlopian went as far as to argue that Anania was an enemy of the Armenian Church and fought against its obscurantism. Hewsen opposed this view, suggesting that, instead, he was an "independent thinker of sorts."

== Philosophy ==
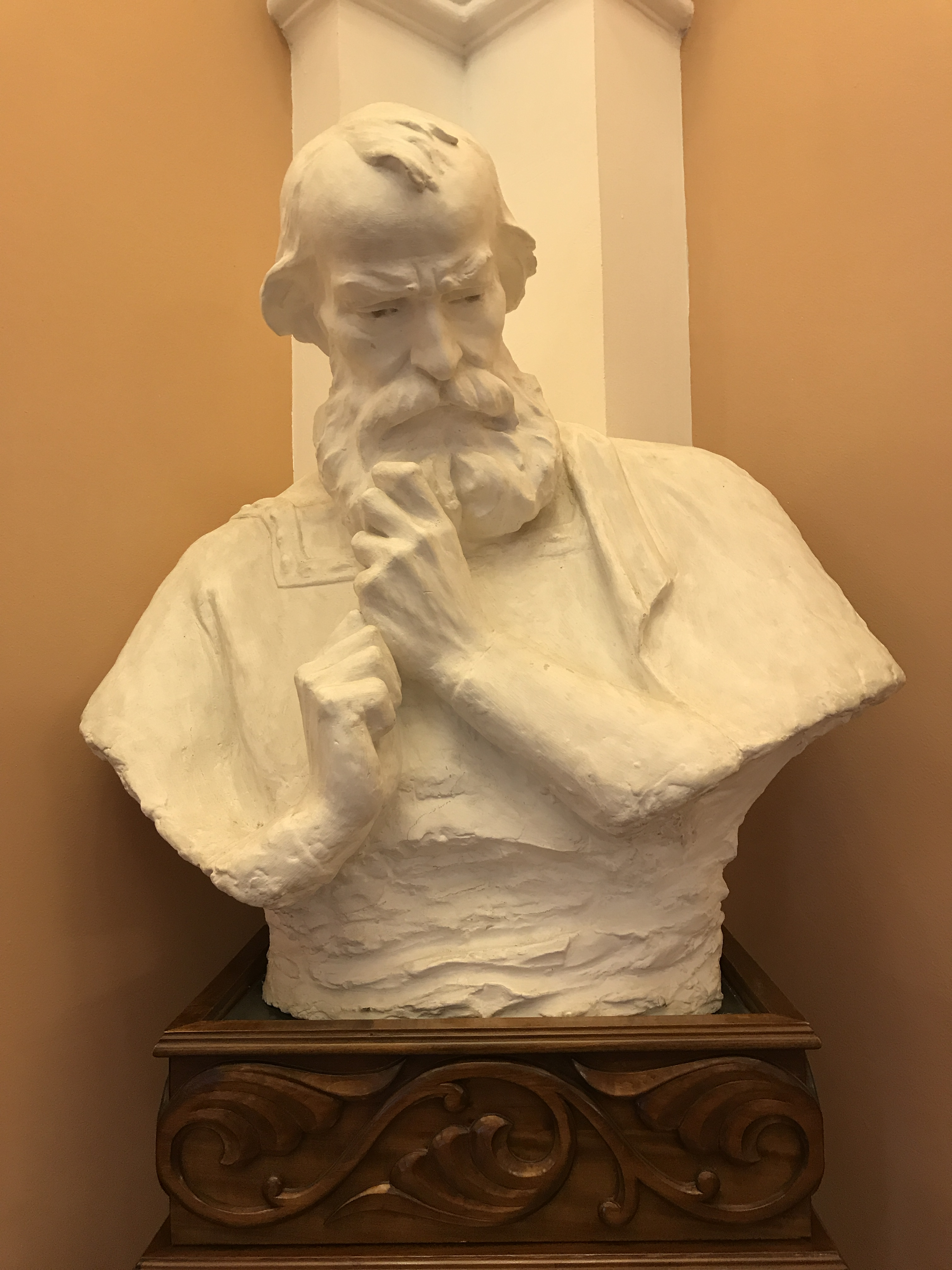
A bust at the Matenadaran

Anania is considered by modern scholars to be a representative of the Hellenizing School since many of his works were based on classical Greek sources. He was the first Armenian scholar to have "imported a set of scientific notions, and examples of their applications, from the Greek-speaking schools" into Armenia. He was well versed in Greek literature, and the influence of Greek syntax is evident in his works. Anania was also knowledgeable about native Armenian and Iranian cultural traditions; several of his works provide important information on late Sassanian Iran.

James R. Russell describes him as an alchemist and a Pythagorean who "does not usually rely on mythology to explain natural phenomena." Anania accepted the importance of experience, observation, rational practice and theory, and was influenced by the ideas of the 5th-century Neoplatonist philosopher Davit Anhaght (the Invincible), and Greek philosophers Thales of Miletus, Hippocrates, Democritus, Plato, Aristotle, Zeno of Citium, Epicurus, Ptolemy, Pappus of Alexandria, and Cosmas Indicopleustes. Aristotle's On the Heavens had a significant influence on Anania's thought. According to Gevorg Khrlopian, Anania was heavily influenced by Yeghishe's An Interpretation of Creation, the anonymous Interpretation of the Categories of Aristotle, and the works of Davit Anhaght, who had established Neoplatonism in Armenian thought. Anania was also the first Armenian scholar to quote Philo of Alexandria by name.

Anania was the last known lay scholar in Christian Armenia until Grigor Magistros Pahlavuni in the 11th century. He advocated rationalism in studying nature and attacked superstitious beliefs and astrology as the "babblings of the foolish." He adopted the classical theory of four elements, which considered all matter to be composed of four elements: fire, air, water, and earth. He believed that while God directly created these elements, He did not interfere with the "natural course of the development of things." He asserted that the creation, existence, and decay of natural bodies and phenomena occurred through the union of these elements—without the interference of God. Both living and non-living matter came into existence from a synthesis of the four elements.

Anania accepted that the Earth is round, describing it as "like an egg with a spherical yolk (the globe) surrounded by a layer of white (the atmosphere) and covered with a hard shell (the sky)." He accurately explained solar and lunar eclipses, the phases of the Moon, and the structure of the Milky Way, describing the latter as a "mass of dense but faintly luminous stars." Anania also correctly attributed tides to the influence of the Moon. He described the topmost sphere as the aether (arp’i), the source of light and heat (through the Sun).

== Works ==
Anania was a polymath and natural philosopher. About 40 works in various disciplines have been attributed to Anania, but only half are extant. They include studies and translations in mathematics, astronomy, cosmology, geography, chronology, and meteorology. Many of his works are believed to have been part of the K’nnikon (Քննիկոն, from "canon", Greek: Kanonikon), completed circa 666, and used as the standard science textbook in medieval Armenia. Artashes Matevosyan termed it the first secular Armenian science textbook, while Valentina Calzolari described it as a "monumental encyclopedic work." Greenwood argued that the K’nnikon was a "fluid compilation, whose contents fluctuated over time, reflecting the interests and resources of different teachers and practitioners."

Modern scholars have praised Anania's writing as concise, simple, and to the point, retaining the reader's attention and citing examples to illustrate his point.

=== Mathematical ===
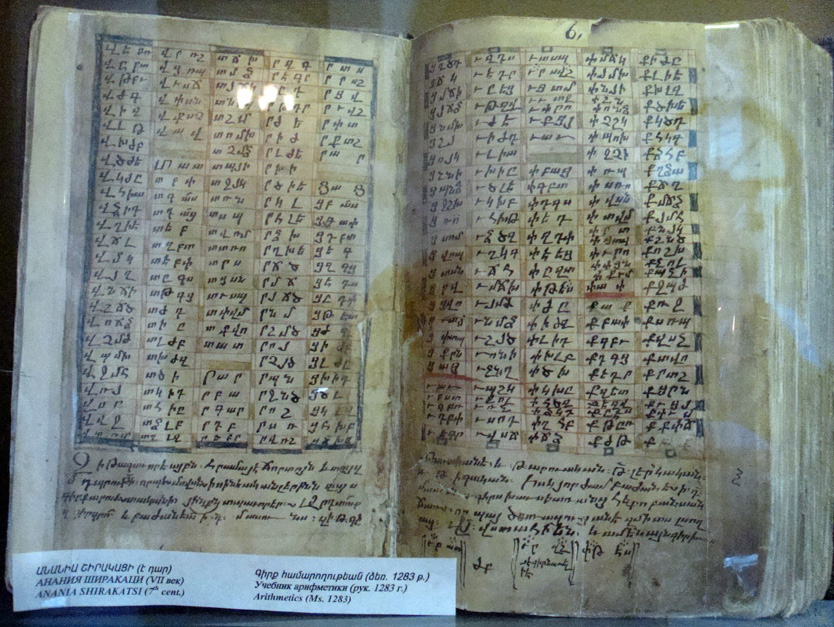
An arithmetic book by Shirakatsi

Anania was primarily devoted to mathematics, which he considered the "mother of all knowledge." His mathematical books were used as textbooks in Armenia.

Of Anania's several mathematical works, the most important is the book of arithmetic (Hamaroghut’iun, Համարողութիւն; or T’vabanut’iun, Թւաբանութիւն), a comprehensive collection of tables on the four basic operations. It is the earliest extant known work of its kind. The operations reach up to a total of 80 million, which is the highest number. A possible theoretical part is believed lost.

Problems and Solutions (alternatively translated as On Questions and Answers), a collection of 24 arithmetical problems and their solutions, is based on the application of fractions; it is the earliest such work in Armenian. Many of its problems allude to real-world situations: six connect to the princely house of Shirak, the Kamsarakans, and at least three to Iran. Greenwood calls the problems "a rich source for seventh-century history whose value has not been sufficiently recognized."

The third work, probably an appendix of the book of arithmetic, is titled Xraxč̣anakank’ (Խրախճանականք), literally "things for festive occasions". It has been translated into English as Mathematical Pastimes, Fun with Arithmetic or Problems for Amusement. It also contains 24 problems "intended for mathematical entertainment in social gatherings." According to Mathews this may be the oldest extant text of its kind.

==== Numerical notation ====
For his mathematical works, Anania developed a unique numerical notation based on 12 letters of the Armenian alphabet. For the units, he used the first nine letters of the Armenian script (Ա, Բ, Գ, Դ, Ե, Զ, Է, Ը, Թ), similar to the standard traditional Armenian numerical system. The letters used for 10, 100, and 1000 were also identical to the traditional Armenian system (Ժ, Ճ, Ռ), but all other numbers up to 10,000 were written using these 12 letters. For instance, 50 would be written ԵԺ (5×10) and not Ծ as in the standard system. Thus, the notation is multiplicative-additive as opposed to the ciphered-additive standard system and requires knowing 12 letters, instead of 36, to write numbers less than 10,000. Numbers greater than that could be written using multiplicative combinations of just 2 or 3 signs, but using all 36 letters.

Stephen Chrisomalis believes this system was created by Anania since it only occurs in his works and is not found in Greek, Syriac, Hebrew, or any other alphabetic numeral system. Allen Shaw has argued it was just a variant of the Armenian numerals designed specifically for the representation of large numbers. No other writer used it.

=== Astronomical ===
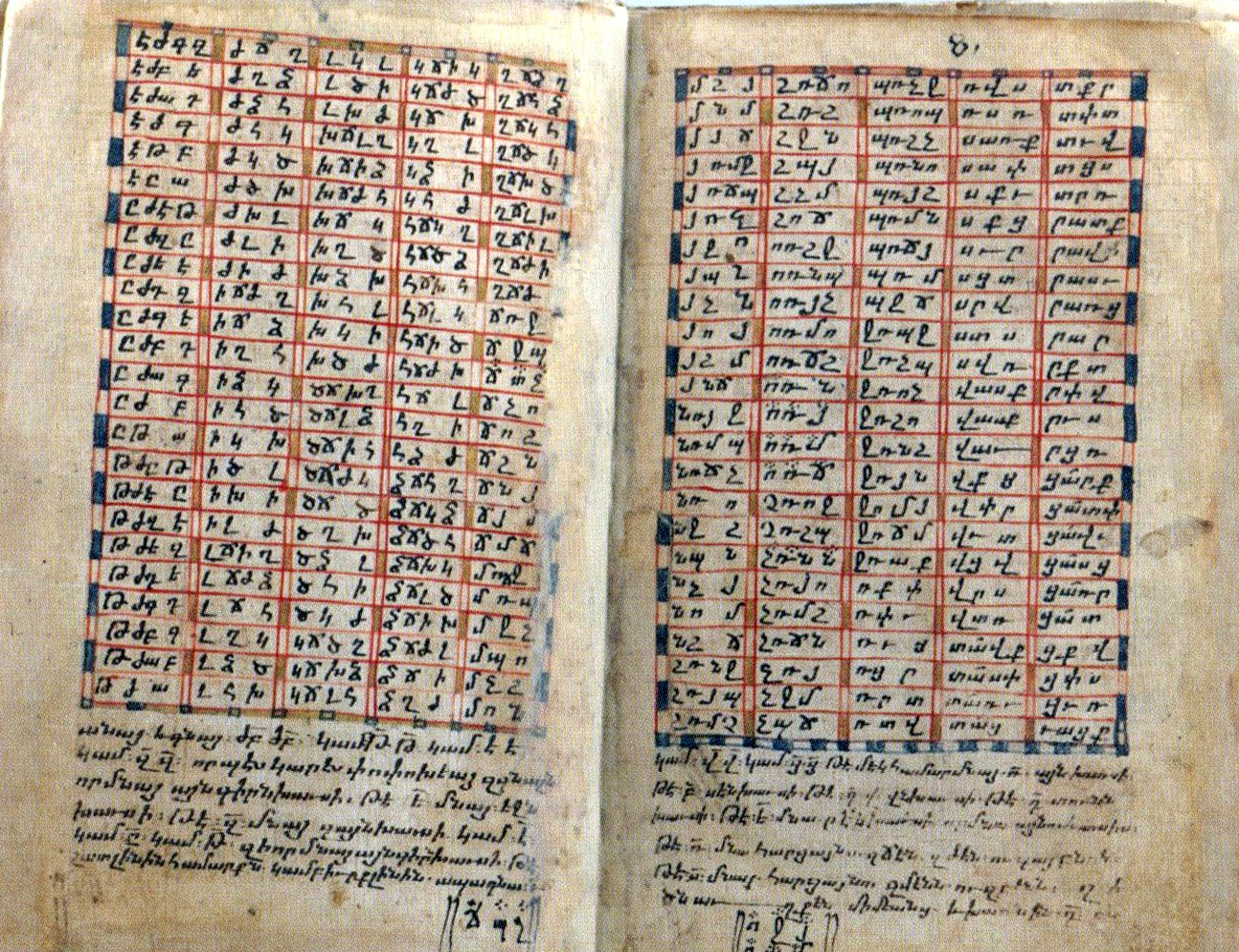
A manuscript of Anania's Cosmology.

One of Anania's most significant works is the Cosmology (Տիեզերագիտութիւն, Tiezeragitut’iun). Abrahamian's version is composed of ten chapters, with an introduction titled "In the Fulfillment of a Promise", implying a patron. It covers the sun, the moon, celestial spheres, constellations, the Milky Way, and meteorological changes.

Works used for the parts of the Cosmology include the Bible (mostly the Pentateuch and Psalms) and works by the Church Fathers. Anania cites the work of Basil of Caesarea, Gregory the Illuminator, and Amphilochius (perhaps, of Iconium). Some chapters of the work, such as "On Clouds" (also called "On the Sky" or "Concerning the Skies"), are largely based on Basil's Hexameron. Anania also repeats the classical Greek notions in the fields of astronomy, physics or meteorology. Pambakian wrote about the significance of the Cosmology:

In conclusion, when viewed as a Byzantine text, the Cosmology's originality may be sought in the way in which pagan and Christian traditions are combined (and often intrinsically intertwined), and much may be learned about the ‘making of science’ in the context of the seventh-century. Within the specific context of Armenian literature, this text deals with many aspects of natural philosophy in unprecedented depth.

Another of Anania's astronomical works, Tables of the Motions of the Moon (Խորանք ընթացիք լուսոյ, Xorank’ ënt’ac’ik’ lusoy), is based on the works of Meton of Athens and his own observations.

==== Perpetual calendar ====
In 667 Anania was invited by Catholicos Anastas I of Akori (r. 661/2–667) to the Armenian Church's central seat at Dvin to establish a fixed calendar of the movable and immovable feasts of the Armenian Church. The result was a perpetual calendar based on a 532-year cycle (ՇԼԲ բոլորակ), combining the solar cycle and the lunar cycle since they coincide every 532 years. It was first proposed by Victorius of Aquitaine in 457 and adopted by the Church of Alexandria. Anania's calendar was never implemented by the Armenian Church; Hovhannes Draskhanakerttsi believes that Anastas's death prevented a church council from ratifying it. Krikor H. Maksoudian described the endeavor a "serious attempt", which was not adopted due to circumstances.

=== Geographical ===
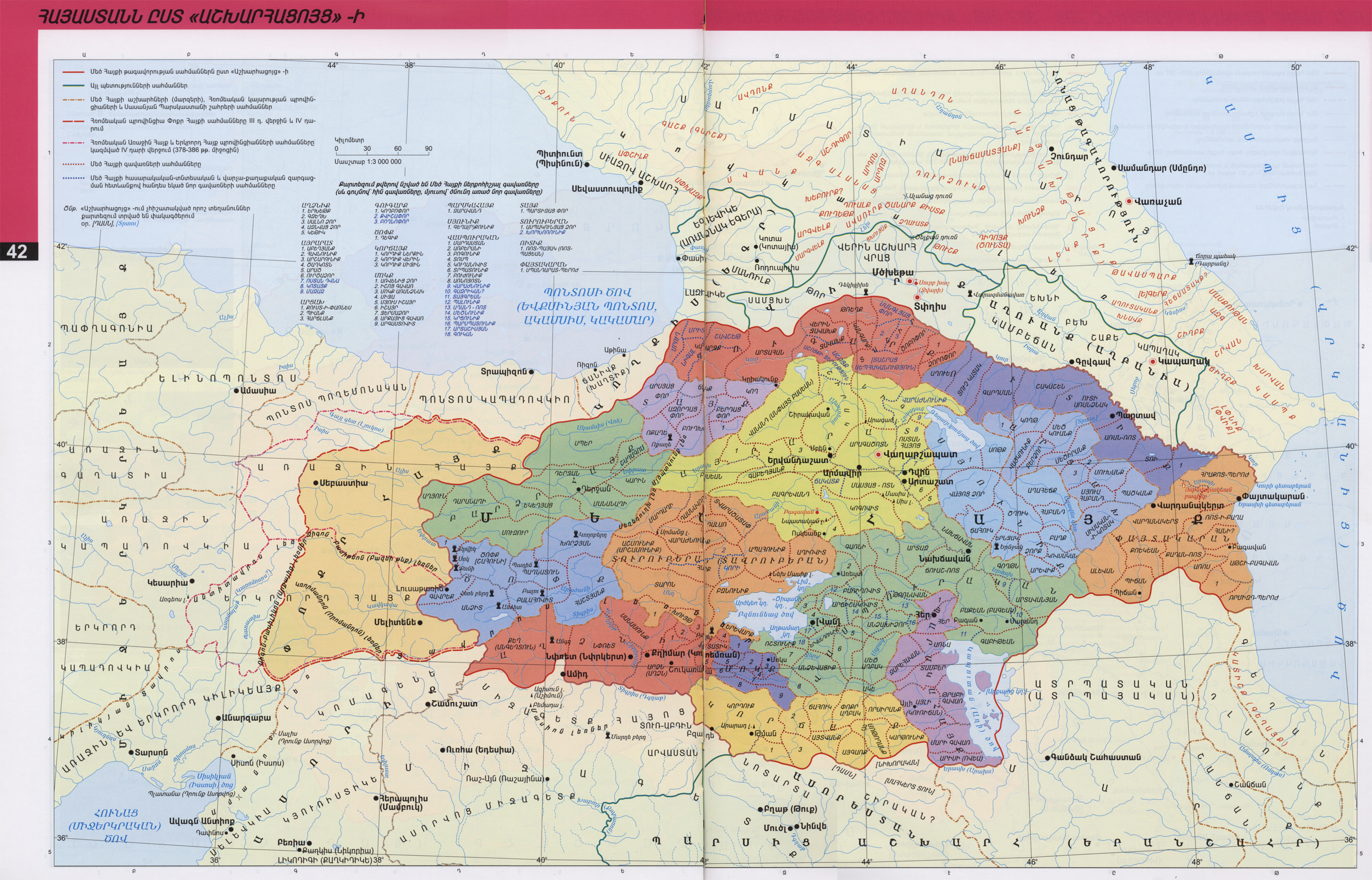
Armenia according to Anania's Geography (Ashkharhatsuyts) as reconstructed by Suren Eremian

The Ashkharhatsuyts (Classical Armenian: Աշխարհացոյց, Ašxarhac’oyc’, lit. "showing the world") is an anonymously published world map, believed to have been written sometime between 610 and 636, "probably shortly before AD 636", i.e. the Muslim Arab invasions and conquests. It lacks a drawn map, but contains "earliest surviving detailed description of Armenian lands." Its authorship has been disputed in the modern period; formerly believed to have been the work of Movses Khorenatsi, most scholars now attribute it to Anania. (Note: A 2025 stylometric analysis of the Ashkharhatsuyts ruled out Movses Khorenatsi and confirmed a clear attribution to Anania Shirakatsi.) Hewsen calls it "one of the most valuable works to come down to us from Armenian antiquity."

The Armenian Geography—as it is alternatively known—has been especially important for research into the history and geography of Greater Armenia, the Caucasus (Georgia and Caucasian Albania) and the Sasanian Empire, which are all described in detail. The information on Armenia is not found elsewhere in historical sources, as it is the only known Armenian geographical work prior to the 13th century. Cowe described it as "the only one of its kind in Armenia until the introduction of modern cartography in the seventeenth century." Christina Maranci described it as the "earliest surviving description of the entire known world in the Armenian language."

The Ashkharhatsuyts has survived in long and short recensions. According to the scholarly consensus, the long recension was the original. For the description of Europe, North Africa and Asia (all the known world from Spain to China), it largely uses Greek sources, namely the now lost geography of Pappus of Alexandria (4th century), which in turn, is based on the Geography of Ptolemy (2nd century). According to Hewsen, it is the "last work based on ancient geographical knowledge written before the Renaissance." Edmond Schütz called it an "outstanding work of medieval sciences, a rich post-Ptolemaid heredity."

It was one of the earliest secular Armenian works to be published (in 1668 by Voskan Yerevantsi). It has been translated into four languages: English, Latin (both 1736), French (1819), and Russian (1877). In 1877, Kerovbe Patkanian first attributed it to Anania as the most probable author.

Another geographical work of Anania, The Itinerary (Մղոնաչափք, Mghonach’ap’k’), may have been a part of the Ashkharhatsuyts. It presents six routes from Dvin, Armenia's capital at that time, to the major settlements in different directions, with distances in miles (մղոն, mghon), referring to the Arabic mile of 1,917.6 metres (6,291 ft), according to Hakob Manandian.

=== Chronology ===
Anania's major chronological work, the Chronicle, listed important events in order of their occurrence. Written between 686 and 690, it is composed of two parts: a universal chronicle, utilizing the lost works of Annianus of Alexandria and the lost Roman imperial sequence from Eusebius's Chronographia, and an ecclesiastical history from a miaphysite perspective, which records the six ecumenical councils.

Another chronological work, known as the Calendar (Tomar), included texts and tables about the calendars of 15 peoples: Armenians, Hebrews, Arabs, Macedonians, Romans, Syrians, Greeks, Egyptians, Ethiopians, Athenians, Bythanians, Cappadocians, Georgians, Caucasian Albanians, and Persians. The calendars of the Armenians, Romans, Hebrews, Syrians, Greeks, and Egyptians contain texts, while those of other peoples only have the names of months and their length.

=== Other ===
Anania wrote several books on weights and measures. He extensively used the work of Epiphanius of Salamis to present the system of weights used by the Greeks, Jews, and Syrians, and his own knowledge as well as other sources for those of the Armenians and Persians. (Note: Robert Pierpont Blake suggested that Anania have also translated Epiphanius's work on gemstones, De Gemmis, which survives in fragments in Armenian and full only in Georgian.)

Anania wrote several works on precious stones, music, and the known languages of the world.

Anania's discourses on Christmas/Epiphany and Easter are discussions on the dates of the two feasts. In the first, he uses a lost work he ascribes to Polycarp of Smyrna and insists that the Armenian custom of celebrating Christmas and the Epiphany on the same date is truer to the holidays' intent than celebrating them separately as is common elsewhere in the Christian world.

== Traditions and legends ==
Anania also wrote on herbal medicine, though none of his medical writings have survived. He is traditionally credited with the discovery of the miraculous flower called hamasp’iwṙ or hamasp’iur (համասփիւռ). One 16th century manuscript mentions that he dealt with its therapeutic properties. It has been identified by modern scholars as Silene latifolia (white campion). He is credited with discovering the plant in Dzoghakert (near modern Taşburun, Iğdır, Turkey) and using it medically.

The authorship of the "Book of the Six Thousand" (Vec‘ hazareak), the "most important Armenian magical text of the Middle Ages", has traditionally been attributed to Anania. According to a later legend, Anania taught alchemy to the king of Venice.

== Influence in the Middle Ages ==
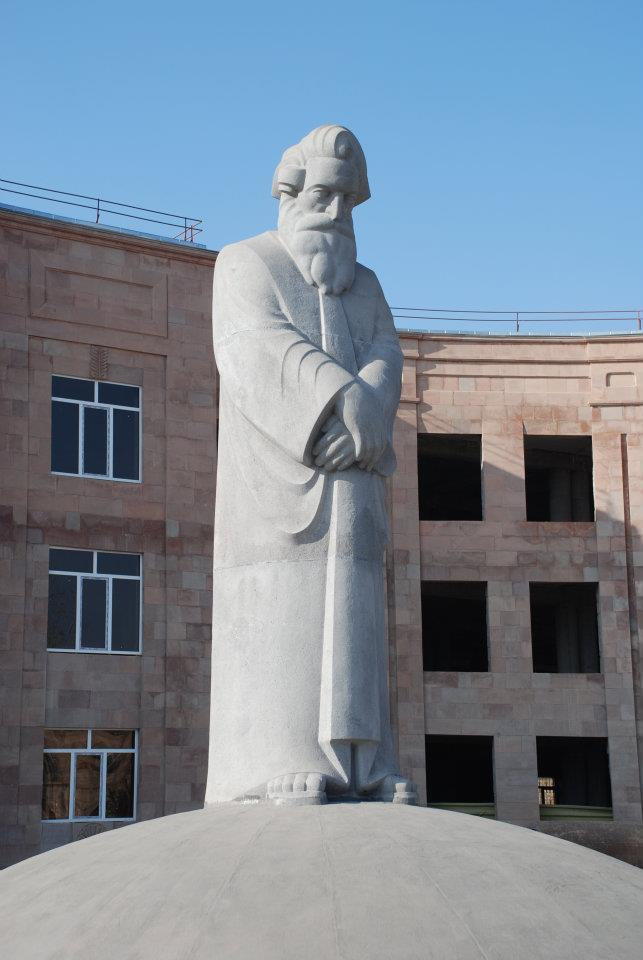
2009 statue of Anania in Gyumri

Anania laid the foundations of the exact sciences in Armenia and greatly influenced many Armenian scholars who came after him. (Note: These include Hovhannes Draskhanakerttsi (d. 925), Anania of Narek (d. 980s), Grigor Magistros (d. 1058), Stepanos Asoghik (11th century), Hovhannes Kozern (11th century), Hovhannes Imastaser (Sarkavag) (d. 1129), Nerses Shnorhali (d. 1173), Samuel Anetsi (12th century), Vanakan (d. 1250), Kirakos Gandzaketsi (d. 1271), Hovhannes Erznkatsi (d. 1293), Grigor Tatevatsi (d. 1410), and Hakob Ghrimetsi (d. 1426).) Robert H. Hewsen argued that Anania failed to create a true intellectual school with disciples who continued his legacy and his isolated genius exposes the dire state of medieval Armenian science. Hovhannes Imastaser (Sarkavag) and other medieval scholars extensively cited and incorporated Anania's works. In a 1037 letter, Grigor Magistros, a scholar from the Pahlavuni noble family, asked Catholicos Petros Getadardz for Anania's manuscripts of his K’nnikon, which were locked up at the catholicosate for centuries. Grigor used these as a textbook at his school at Sanahin Monastery. Anania may have also influenced Byzantine scholars of Armenian origin, namely Leo the Mathematician in the 9th century and Nicholas Artabasdos Rhabdas in the 14th century.

== Reemergence in the modern period ==
In the printed age, passing references to Anania were made as early as 1742 by Paghtasar Dpir, but it was not until the latter half of the 19th century that Anania and his work became a subject of scholarly study. In 1877 Kerovbe Patkanian published a collection of Anania's works in the original classical Armenian at St Petersburg University. Titled Sundry Studies (Մնացորդք բանից, Mnats’ordk’ banits’), it is the first-ever print publication of his works. Galust Ter-Mkrtchian published a number of Anania's works in 1896. The Russian Academy of Sciences published Joseph Orbeli's Russian translation of Anania's Problems and Solutions in 1918.

Systematic study and publication of his works began in the Soviet period. Ashot G. Abrahamian, who began his research at the Matenadaran in the 1930s, first published one of Anania's arithmetical texts in 1939, followed by a complete compilation of Anania's work in 1944. One critic objected to his compilation for attributing disputed works to Anania. Abrahamian and Garegin Petrosian published an updated edition in 1979. Some criticism persisted: Varag Arakelian noted a number of errors in translations from classical Armenian and concluded that a new translation of his works was needed. Another Soviet scholar, Suren T. Eremian, studied the Geography. He insisted on Anania's authorship and published his research in 1963.

The first translation of Anania's work into a European language was done by the British Orientalist Frederick Cornwallis Conybeare, who translated into English Anania's On Christmas, in 1896, and On Easter and Anania's autobiography, in 1897. Lemerle noted that Conybeare translated Anania's autobiography from a Russian translation, and it contains numerous serious errors. Renewed interest in Anania's work emerged in the West since the 1950s, with a series of English articles in the Armenian Review. A French translation of his autobiography appeared in 1964 by Haïg Berbérian. Robert H. Hewsen authored an introductory article on Anania's life and scholarship in 1968. Hewsen dedicated his monumental atlas of Armenia (2001) to Anania, whom he called "Armenia's First Scientist."

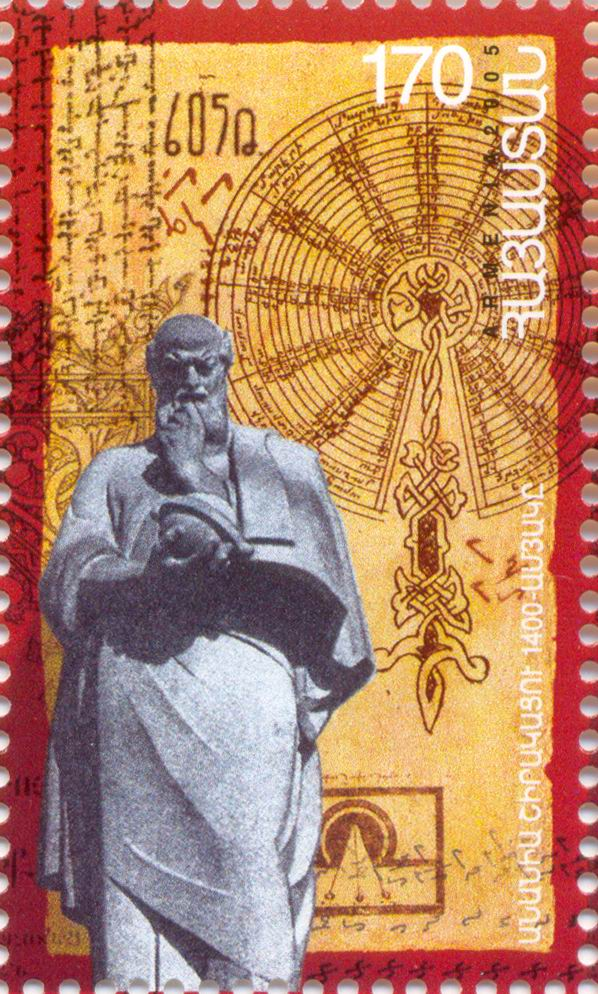
2005 Armenian postage stamp depicting Shirakatsi

== Modern assessment ==
Hailed as a polymath, Anania is considered by modern scholars as the "father of the exact sciences in Armenia." Modern historians consider him as the greatest scientist of medieval Armenia and, possibly, all Armenian history, up to the 20th century astrophysicist Viktor Ambartsumian. He is widely regarded as the founder of the natural sciences in the country. He was the first classical Armenian scholar to study mathematics and several scientific subjects, such as cosmography and chronology. Nicholas Adontz argued that Anania "occupied the same position in Armenian education as Leo [the Mathematician] did in Byzantine education. He was the first to sow the seeds of science among the Armenians." Robert H. Hewsen called him "one of the most original" and "one of the most curious figures in Armenian cultural history." Hacikyan et al. wrote in The Heritage of Armenian Literature: "Shirakatsi was an educator and an organizer of ideas and materials rather than an original thinker. He was often in the forefront of scientific thinking, but at other times he repeated the accepted theories of his time."

Suren Yeremian named Anania, along with historian Movses Khorenatsi and philosopher David the Invincible, one of the prominent thinkers of the "great cultural flourishing" in Armenia of the fifth to seventh centuries, when Hellenistic traditions were still strong and continued to bear the influence of the secular thinking of the pre-Christian times. Sen Arevshatyan argued that the "Christian spirit" is more prominent in Anania than in earlier figures of the Hellenizing School as he aims to bridge Hellenistic science and church doctrine. "Nevertheless, despite his inconsistencies, he emerges as the greatest representative of natural knowledge and natural philosophy in early feudal Armenia."

In Soviet reference books, Anania was often mentioned as the earliest astronomer among its peoples. (Note: Pyotr G. Kulikovsky listed Anania alongside Islamic Golden Age scholars Al-Khwarizmi, al-Biruni, Omar Khayyam, Nasir al-Din al-Tusi, and Ulugh Beg as "greatest scholars" representing the "peoples who lived in the present territory of the USSR in the Caucasus and Central Asia.") Greenwood argues that studying Anania and his works "resonated with twentieth-century political beliefs and offered a suitable subject for academic research in ways that works on medieval theology or Biblical exegesis did not. Anania came to be projected as a national hero from the distant Armenian past, linking and affirming past and present identities."

== Tributes ==
- Statuettes of Anania were created by Nikolai Nikoghosyan (c. 1945) and Yervand Kochar (gypsum, 1952). Ara Sargsyan crafted a plaquette of him in 1957.
- Anania was one of six medieval scholars whose statue was erected in front of the Matenadaran, the museum-institute of Armenian manuscripts in Yerevan, in the 1960s. Sculpted by Grigor Badalyan in basalt, it was erected in 1963. A bust of Anania by Badalyan stands inside the Matenadaran.
- A statue, sculpted by Aram Gharibyan, was erected in the front yard of Yerevan State University in 1999. Another basalt statue of Anania by Samvel Petrosyan was erected in Gyumri in 2009.
- A crater on the Moon was named Shirakatsi in 1979.
- The Anania Shirakatsy Lyceum, an International Baccalaureate school in Yerevan, was established in 1990.
- In 1993 the Medal of Anania Shirakatsi, a state award, was established. It is awarded for "significant activities, inventions, and discoveries in the spheres of economy, engineering, architecture, science, and technology."
- In 2005 the Central Bank of Armenia issued a commemorative coin, while HayPost issued a stamp dedicated to him.
- A short 2016 documentary by Armenian Public TV.

== Bibliography ==
=== Books on Anania ===
- Patkanian, Kerovbe (1877). Անանիայի Շիրակունւոյ Մնացորդք բանից [Sundry Studies of Anania Shirakatsi] (in Armenian). Saint Petersburg University.
- Abrahamian, Ashot G. (1944). Անանիա Շիրակացու մատենագրությունը (in Armenian). Yerevan: Armenian SSR Matenadaran Press.
- Abrahamian, Ashot G.; Petrosian, Garegin B. (1979). Անանիա Շիրակացի․ Մատենագրություն [Anania Shirakatsi: Writings] (in Armenian). Yerevan: Sovetakan grogh. online
- Eremian, Suren (1963). Հայաստանը ըստ "Աշխարհացոյց"-ի (in Armenian). Yerevan: Armenian Academy of Sciences Press.
- Gyulumyan, O., ed. (2012). Անանիա Շիրակացի: Կենսամատենագիտություն [Anania Shirakatsi: Bibliography] (in Armenian). Yerevan: National Library of Armenia. ISBN 978-99930-65-86-9. PDF (archived)
- Hewsen, Robert H. (1992). The Geography of Ananias of Širak. Wiesbaden: Ludwig Reichert Verlag.
- Khrlopian, Gevorg T. (1964). Անանիա Շիրակացու աշխարհայացքը [Anania Shirakatsi's worldview]. Yerevan: Yerevan State University. OCLC 37519113.

=== General books ===
- Adontz, Nicholas (1970). Armenia in the Period of Justinian. Translated by Nina Garsoïan. Lisbon: Calouste Gulbenkian Foundation.
- Lemerle, Paul (2017) [1971]. Le premier humanisme byzantin [Byzantine Humanism: The First Phase]. Lindsay Helen, Ann Moffatt (trans.). Leiden: Brill. pp. 90–94. ISBN 9789004344594.
- Hewsen, Robert H. (2001). Armenia: A Historical Atlas. University of Chicago Press. ISBN 0-226-33228-4.
- Sarafian, Kevork A. (1930). History of Education in Armenia. Press of the La Verne Leader.
- Acharian, Hrachia (1942). Հայոց անձնանունների բառարան [Dictionary of Personal Names] (in Armenian). Vol. 1. Yerevan State University. pp. 148-149.
- Redgate, A. E. (2000). The Armenians. Oxford: Blackwell Publishing. ISBN 9780631220374.

=== Book chapters on Anania ===
- Abeghian, Manuk (1944). "Անանիա Շիրակացի [Anania Shirakatsi]". Հայոց Հին Գրականության Պատմություն [History of Ancient Armenian Literature] (in Armenian). Yerevan: Armenian SSR Academy of Sciences. pp. 373-387.
- Chrisomalis, Stephen (2010). "Shirakatsi's Notation". Numerical Notation: A Comparative History. Cambridge University Press. pp. 175-177. ISBN 9780521878180.
- Hacikyan, Agop Jack; Basmajian, Gabriel; Franchuk, Edward S.; Ouzounian, Nourhan (2002). "Anania Shirakatsi (Anania of Shirak)". The Heritage of Armenian Literature: From the sixth to the eighteenth century. Detroit: Wayne State University Press. pp. 56-80. ISBN 9780814330234.
- Mathews, Edward G. Jr. (2008a). "Anania of Shirak". In Keyser, Paul T.; Irby-Massie, Georgia L. (eds.). Encyclopedia of Ancient Natural Scientists: The Greek Tradition and its Many Heirs. Routledge. pp. 70-71. ISBN 9781134298020.
- Mathews, Edward G. Jr. (2008b). "Hellenizing School (Arm. Yunaban Drpoc; ca 570 – ca 730)". In Keyser, Paul T.; Irby-Massie, Georgia L. (eds.). Encyclopedia of Ancient Natural Scientists: The Greek Tradition and its Many Heirs. Routledge. ISBN 9781134298020.
- Terian, Abraham (1980). "The Hellenizing School: Its Time, Place, and Scope of Activities Reconsidered". In Nina Garsoïan; Thomas F. Mathews; Robert W. Thomson (eds.). East of Byzantium: Syria and Armenia in the Formative Period. Washington, D.C.: Dumbarton Oaks. pp. 175-186.
- Thomson, Robert W. (1997). "Armenian Literary Culture Through the Eleventh Century". In Hovannisian, Richard G. (ed.). The Armenian People from Ancient to Modern Times: Volume I: The Dynastic Periods: From Antiquity to the Fourteenth Century. New York: St. Martin's Press. pp. 199–240.
- van Lint, Theo (2018). "Ananias of Shirak (Anania Shirakats'i)". In Nicholson, Oliver (ed.). The Oxford Dictionary of Late Antiquity. Oxford University Press. p. 68. ISBN 978-0-19-881624-9.

=== Encyclopedia articles ===
- Greenwood, Timothy William (9 April 2018). "Ananias of Shirak (Anania Širakac'i)". Encyclopædia Iranica.
- Tumanian, B.; Matevosian, A.; Chaloyan, V. [in Armenian]; Abrahamian, A. [in Armenian]; Tahmizian, N. (1974). Անանիա Շիրակացի [Anania Shirakatsi]. Soviet Armenian Encyclopedia (in Armenian). Vol. I. pp. 362–364 – via Wikisource.

=== Journal articles ===
- Adontz, Nicholas (1950). "Role of the Armenians in Byzantine Science" (PDF). The Armenian Review. 3. Translated by J. G. M.: 55–73. Archived from the original (PDF) on 2017-08-01.
- Conybeare, F. E. (1897). "Ananias of Shirak (A. D. 600—650 c.)" (PDF). Byzantinische Zeitschrift. 6 (3): 572–584. doi:10.1515/byzs.1897.6.3.572. S2CID 194109254.
- Cowe, S. Peter (1997). "Review of The Geography of Ananias of Širak (AŠXARHAʿCOYʿC), the Long and the Short Recensions: Introduction, Translation and Commentary". Journal of the American Oriental Society. 117 (2): 379–380. doi:10.2307/605516. ISSN 0003-0279. JSTOR 605516.
- Hewsen, Robert H. (1968). "Science in Seventh-Century Armenia: Ananias of Širak". Isis. 59 (1). History of Science Society: 32–45. doi:10.1086/350333. JSTOR 227850. S2CID 145014073.
- Vasiliev, Alexander (1945). "Reviewed Work: Armenia and the Byzantine Empire. A Brief Study of Armenian Art and Civilization by Sirapie Der Nersessian". Speculum. 20 (4): 492. doi:10.2307/2856749. JSTOR 2856749.
- Simyonov, L. [in Russian] (1947). "Պրոֆ. դոկտոր Ա. Աբրահամյան. – "Անանիա Շիրակացու մատենագրությունը"։ Երևան, Հայպետհրատ, 1944 թ." Bulletin of the Academy of Sciences of the Armenian SSR: Social Sciences (in Armenian) (3): 97–100. Archived from the original on 2019-03-30.
- Arakelian, V. D. [in Armenian] (1981). "Անանիա Շիրակացի, Մատենագրություն, թարգմանությունը, աոաջաբանը և ծանոթագրությունները Ա. Գ. Աբրահամյանի և Գ. Բ. Պետրոսյանի, Երևան, 1979 [Ananya Shirakatsi: Selected Works, transl. by A. G. Abrahamian and G. B. Petrossian]". Patma-Banasirakan Handes (in Armenian) (4): 295–300.
- Berbérian, Haïg (1964). "Autobiographie d'Anania Sirakac'i". Revue des Études Arméniennes (in French) (1): 189–194.
- Shaw, Allen A. (1939). "An Overlooked Numeral System of Antiquity". National Mathematics Magazine. 13 (8). Mathematical Association of America: 368–372. doi:10.2307/3028489. JSTOR 3028489.
- Jeu, Bernard (1973). "A Note on Some Armenian Philosophers". Studies in Soviet Thought. 13 (3/4). Springer: 251–264. doi:10.1007/BF01043876. JSTOR 20098573. S2CID 143364705.
- Pambakian, Stephanie (2018). "Tradition and Innovation in the Cosmology of Anania Širakac'i". Armenia, Caucaso, Asia Centrale (PDF). Eurasiatica. Vol. 11. Edizioni Ca’ Foscari. pp. 9–24. doi:10.30687/978-88-6969-279-6/001. ISBN 978-88-6969-280-2. Archived from the original on 2019-04-12.
- Matevosian, Artashes [in Armenian] (1994). "Գրիգոր Մագիստրոսը և Անանիա Շիրակացու "Քննիկոնը"" (PDF). Banber Matenadarani (in Armenian) (16). Matenadaran: 16–30. Archived from the original (PDF) on 2015-10-29.
- Greenwood, Tim (2011). "A Reassessment of the Life and Mathematical Problems of Anania Širakac'i". Revue des Études Arméniennes. 33: 131–186.
- Greppin, John A. C. (1995). "Comments on Early Armenian Knowledge of Botany as Revealed in the Geography of Ananias of Shirak". Journal of the American Oriental Society. 115 (4): 679–684. doi:10.2307/604736. JSTOR 604736.
- Hayrapetian, S. (1941). "Անանիա Շիրակացու կյանքն ու գործունեությունը [Life and career of Anania Shirakatsi]" (PDF). Banber Matenadarani (in Armenian) (1). Matenadaran.
- Vardanyan, Vahram (2013). "Անանիա Շիրակացին' հայոց հոգևոր և քաղաքական ինքնուրույնության ջահակիր [Anania Shirakatsi: An Armenian Torchbearer of Spiritual and Political Autonomy]". Lraber Hasarakakan Gitutyunneri (in Armenian) (3): 9–19.
- Greenwood, Tim (2008). ""New Light from the East": Chronography and Ecclesiastical History through a Late Seventh-Century Armenian Source". Journal of Early Christian Studies. 16 (2): 197–254. doi:10.1353/earl.0.0018. S2CID 170843259.
- Broutian, Grigor (2009). "Persian and Arabic Calendars as Presented by Anania Shirkatsi". Tarikh-e Elm. 7 (1). University of Tehran: 1–17.
- Danielyan, Eduard L. [in Armenian] (2008). "The Contribution of Academician Victor Hambartsumyan to the History of Armenian and World Cosmological Thought and Astronomy". Lraber Hasarakakan Gitutyunneri (3): 256–259.
- Chaloyan, Vazgen K. [in Armenian] (1964). "Անանիա Շիրակացու բնափիլիսոփայական հայացքները [The natural-philosophical views of Anania Shirakatsi]". Natural Sciences and History of Technology in Armenia (in Armenian) (3). Armenian Academy of Sciences: 142–171.
- Russell, James R. (2004). "The Dream Vision of Anania Širakac'i". Armenian and Iranian Studies. Cambridge, Massachusetts: Harvard University Press.; originally published in Revue des Études Arméniennes 21, 1988–89, pp. 159–170
- Petri, Winfried (1964). "Ananija Schirakazi — ein armenischer Kosmograph des 7. Jahrhunderts". Zeitschrift der Deutschen Morgenländischen Gesellschaft (in German). 114 (2): 269–288. ISSN 0341-0137. JSTOR 43372034.
- Arevshatyan, Sen (1984). "Փիլիսոփայություն. Բնափիլիսոփայություն և ճշգրիտ գիտություններ։ Անանիա Շիրակացի [Philosophy: Natural Philosophy and Exact Sciences. Anania Shirakatsi]". Հայ ժողովրդի պատմություն, Հ. 2. [History of the Armenian People. Vol. 2] (in Armenian). Yerevan: Soviet Armenian Academy of Sciences. pp. 526-527.
