= Grigor Magistros =

Armenian prince and scholar (c. 990–1058)

Grigor Pahlavuni Magistros
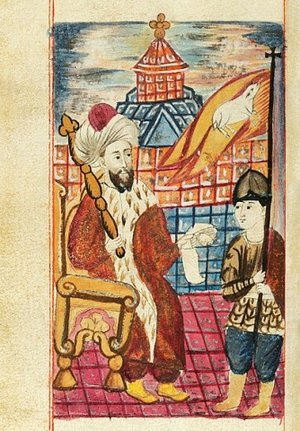
- A portrait of Grigor Magistros from an eighteenth-century manuscript

Doux of Mesopotamia
- In office 1048–1056
- Monarch: Constantine IX Monomachos

Personal details
- Born: c. 990
- Died: 1058
- Children: Vahram Pahlavuni; Vasak Pahlavuni
- Parent: Vasak Pahlavuni

Military service
- Allegiance: Kingdom of Armenia (c.1040 – 1045); Byzantine Empire (1045 – 1058)
- Years of service: c. 1040 – 1058

Grigor Magistros (Armenian: Գրիգոր Մագիստրոս, 'Gregory the magistros'; c. 990–1058) was an Armenian prince, linguist, scholar and Byzantine official. A layman of the princely Pahlavuni family, he was the son of the military commander Vasak Pahlavuni. After the Byzantine Empire annexed the Bagratid kingdom of Armenia, Gregory went on to serve as the governor (doux) of the province of Edessa. During his tenure he worked actively to suppress the Tondrakians, a breakaway Christian Armenian sect that the Armenian and Byzantine churches both labeled heretics. He studied both ecclesiastical and secular literature, Syriac as well as Greek. He collected all Armenian manuscripts of scientific or philosophical value that were to be found, including the works of Anania Shirakatsi, and translations from Callimachus, Andronicus of Rhodes and Olympiodorus. He translated Plato's Timaeus and Phaedo, but these translations have not been preserved. His private letters discuss a variety of topics, including contemporary politics and philosophy, and are useful as historical sources.

== Biography ==
Grigor was born c. 990 into the Armenian princely Pahlavuni family. The Pahlavunis were known as the Kamsarakans prior to the eighth century and ultimately derived from the House of Karen, one of the seven great dynasties of Iran which claimed Arsacid descent. Grigor's father, Vasak Pahlavuni, was the lord of Bjni, and his paternal uncle, Vahram, was the sparapet (supreme military commander) of the Bagratid kingdom of Ani. He received the best education available at the time, including both secular and religious subjects, in the Bagratid capital of Ani. Like his uncle, Grigor supported King Gagik II and the independence of the Bagratid kingdom against the encroachments of the Byzantine Empire. In 1042–1043, he and Gagik II fought off a group of Turkmens raiding Bjni. In 1045, he accompanied Gagik II to Constantinople for negotiations with Emperor Constantine IX Monomachos regarding the fate of the Bagratid kingdom, which had been deeded to the Byzantine emperor by Gagik's predecessor. Seeing that there was no hope for the independence of the Bagratid kingdom, Grigor decided to surrender his ancestral possessions to the Byzantines and received lands and villages in Mesopotamia in return. He also received the title magistros. In 1048, he was appointed Doux of Mesopotomia. He was also entrusted with governance of other southwestern provinces of Armenia, including Taron and Vaspurakan. In this role, he enacted reforms and defended the empire's eastern borders against the Seljuk Turks. He led the persecution and eradication of the Tondrakians, an Armenian Christian sect which was considered heretical; although he claims to have forbidden the killing, torture, and branding of the heretics.

Grigor Magistros was unusual in that he actively participated in Armenian cultural life and wrote in Armenian even after becoming an official of the Byzantine Empire. Unlike most Armenians who entered Byzantine service, he was allowed to maintain his Armenian faith and was not required to convert to Byzantine Orthodoxy. He constructed or reconstructed churches, monasteries, and chapels in Kecharuyk (Kecharis Monastery), Havuts Tar and other places. He also founded a school where he taught rhetoric, philosophy, grammar, and mathematics, among other subjects. His son Vahram was elected Catholicos (head of the Armenian Church) as Gregory II in 1065 and reigned until his death in 1105. Another of his sons, Vasak Pahlavuni, was the doux of Antioch in 1078–1079.

== Works ==
Grigor Magistros had a variety of interests and wrote works in several genres. An important part of his writings are his letters, which are 80 in number and were written to a wide range of correspondents, including prominent figures like Catholicos Peter I of Armenia and other churchmen but also private individuals and friends. They are useful as historical sources and can be divided into three main groups by subject: dogmatic, philosophical, and family. Many of his letters give information about political occurrences, scholarly and educational issues, and medical questions. Some popular stories and myths have been preserved thanks to his recording them in his letters for didactic purposes. Private letters were a completely new genre in Armenian literature. The letters are also original in their style. Robert W. Thomson writes, "Gregory was deeply imbued with the contemporary Greek enthusiasm for classical learning. His letters abound in recondite allusions to the literature of pagan antiquity; and their tortuous language, rich in neologisms, reflects the rhetorical obscurity of Byzantine style." The letters' extensive use of allegory and references to known and unknown works often makes them difficult to understand, a problem which has been exacerbated by the errors and misunderstandings of later scribes. Later Armenian authors did not follow Grigor Magistros in his use of Byzantine literary patterns.

Grigor Magistros's chief poetical work is a long metrical narrative of the principal events recorded in the Bible, titled Hazartoghyan ar Manuche (A thousand lines for Manuche). This work was purportedly written in three days in 1045 at the request of a Muslim scholar, Manuche (identified by Abraham Terian as the vizier, theologian and poet Abu Nasr al-Manazi). Grigor was one of the first poets to introduce the use of rhyme into Armenian poetry. In Hazartoghyan ar Manuche, he utilized monorhyme, which is typical of the Arabic poetic genre of qasida. All of the poem's lines end in the syllable -in, which "maximized the possibilities for grammatical diversity in Armenian and hence facilitated stylistic variation" Hazartoghyan ar Manuche was held up as a standard for Armenian long narrative poems until the end of the seventeenth century.

Grigor Magistros also wrote a commentary on the Grammar of Dionysius Thrax, a work which had earlier been translated into Armenian by authors of the Hellenizing School. He translated Euclid's Geometry into Armenian, but only a brief section of this translation has survived. In his letters, he mentioned that he translated Plato's Timaeus and Phaedo, but these are also apparently lost; the extant Armenian translations of Platonic dialogues (which include Timaeus but not Phaedo) are now considered the work of other translators.

== Views and philosophy ==
Sen Arevshatyan describes Grigor Magistros as "one of the most cultured people of [his] time" and an "open-minded intellectual", despite being "an ideologue of his social class". He prioritized secular subjects in his educational program, frequently clashing with those in favor of a purely religious education. He thought that education must begin with reading scripture, then move on to the study of mythology and legends and the memorization of fine passages from "Homeric and Platonic" works. After a student mastered the trivium (grammar, logic, and rhetoric), he could progress to the quadrivium (astronomy, arithmetic, music and geometry), which was viewed as the components of mathematics. After mastering mathematics, one could progress from physics to metaphysics.

In philosophy, Grigor was a follower of Plato and the Neoplatonist author David the Invincible. However, during his time Neoplatonism in Armenia was already giving way to new schools of philosophy. According to Arevshatyan, Grigor maintained the basic ideas of David the Invincible while moving in the direction of rationalism. He regarded physical and mathematical knowledge as a necessary precondition for recognition of the divine. Knowledge based on the senses is the first step, which is the basis of higher knowledge based on reason.

== Selected publications ==
- Grigor Magistrosi tʻghtʻerě Գրիգոր Մագիստրոսի թղթերը [The letters of Grigor Magistros]. Original Old Armenian text with Modern Armenian introduction and notes by K. Kostaniants. Aleksandropol: Tparan Gēorg Sanoyeantsʻi. 1910. An English translation, with commentary, by Professor Theo van Lint at Oxford was underway as of 2015.
- Magnalia Dei: Biblical History in Epic Verse by Grigor Magistros. Hebrew University Armenian Studies 14. Critical text, with introduction, translation, and commentary by Abraham Terian. Leuven: Peeters. 2012. ISBN 978-90-429-2507-6.
- Taghasatsʻutʻiwnkʻ Տաղասացութիւնք [Poems]. Venice. 1868.
