= Armenian studies =

Field of research

Armenian studies or Armenology (Armenian: հայագիտություն, pronounced [hɑjɑɡituˈtʰjun]) is a field of humanities covering Armenian history, language and culture. The emergence of modern Armenian studies is associated with the foundation of the Catholic Mechitarist order in the early 18th century. Until the early 20th century, Armenian studies were largely conducted by individual scholars in the Armenian communities of the Russian Empire (Moscow, Saint Petersburg, New Nakhichevan, Tiflis), Europe (Venice, Vienna, Paris, London, Berlin, Leipzig), Constantinople and Vagharshapat in Armenia. After the establishment of Soviet rule, Armenian studies, and sciences in general, were institutionalized in Armenia and put under direct control of the Academy of Sciences. Today, numerous research centers in many parts of the world specialize in Armenian studies.

== Notable scholars who have worked in the field of Armenian studies ==
=== Early scholars ===
- Maturin Veyssière La Croze (1661–1739), historian and orientalist
- Lord Byron (1788–1824), English poet
- Marie-Félicité Brosset (1802–1880), French orientalist
- Johann Heinrich Hübschmann (1848–1908), German philologist
- Victor Langlois (1829–1869), French historian
- Arthur Leist (1852–1927), German writer, journalist and translator
- Mkhitar Sebastatsi (1676–1749), the founder of Mechitarist Congregation
- Mikayel Chamchian (1738–1823), Mechitarist monk and historian
- Ghevont Alishan (1820–1901), Mechitarist historian

=== Modern scholars ===
- Manouk Abeghian (1865–1944), scholar of literature and folklore
- Hrachia Adjarian (1876–1953), linguist, etymologist, philologist
- Nicholas Adontz (1871–1942), historian
- Arakel Babakhanian (pen-name Leo) (1860–1932), historian
- Karapet Basmadjian (1864–1942) historian
- Robert Pierpont Blake (1886–1950)
- Grigor Ghapantsyan (1887–1957)
- Yaroslav Dashkevych (1926–2010), archaeographer, archivist, historian, studied Kipchak-Armenian documents, doctor of historical sciences
- Anaïd Donabédian-Demopoulos linguist, INaLCO Paris, specialist in syntax, corpus linguistics, teaching of Armenian as a second language
- Ashkharbek Kalantar (1884–1942), archaeologist
- Toros Toramanian (1864–1934), architectural historian
- Vahan Kurkjian (1863–1961), historian
- Sirarpie Der-Nersessian (1896–1989), art historian
- Joseph Orbeli (1887–1961), Orientalist
- Josef Markwart (1864–1930), historian, orientalist
- Alexey Jivelegov (1875–1952), historian
- Nikolai Marr (1865–1935), Russian historian, archaeologist, and linguist
- Antoine Meillet (1866–1936), French linguist
- Stepan Malkhasyants (1857–1947), philologist, linguist, and lexicographer
- Sen Arevshatyan (1928–2014), historian
- Mary Kilbourne Matossian (1930-2023)
- Stephan Astourian, Professor of History and Director of the Armenian Studies Program at the University of California, Berkeley
- Armen Ayvazyan (born 1964), historian, political scientist
- Walter Bachmann, architectural historian, traveller
- Vahan Baibourtian (born 1933), historian
- Peter Balakian (born 1951), poet, writer and academic
- Rouben Paul Adalian
- Hagop Barsoumian (1936–1986), historian
- Hrach Bartikyan (1927–2011), academician
- George Bournoutian (1943–2021), historian at Iona College
- Peter Charanis (1908–1985)
- S. Peter Cowe, Narekatsi Professor of Armenian Studies, UCLA
- Vahakn Dadrian (1926–2019), sociologist, historian, genocide scholar
- Charles Dowsett (1924–1998)
- Paul Essabal, linguist
- Rouben Galichian (born 1938), cartographer, map researcher
- Vartan Matiossian (born 1964), historian
- Aram Ter-Ghevondyan (1928–1988), historian
- Vartan Gregorian, (1934–2021), historian
- Edmund Herzig, historian
- Robert H. Hewsen (1934–2018), Professor Emeritus of History at Rowan College
- Tessa Hofmann (born 1949), historian
- Richard G. Hovannisian (1932-2023), Professor Emeritus of Armenian and Near Eastern History, UCLA
- Edward Jrbashian (1923–1999), literary critic
- Raymond Kévorkian (born 1953), historian
- Hranush Kharatyan (born 1952), ethnographer
- Dickran Kouymjian (born 1934), writer, publisher, editor, historian
- David Marshall Lang (1924–1991)
- Gerard Libaridian (born 1945), historian
- Theo Maarten van Lint (born 1957), Calouste Gulbenkian Professor of Armenian Studies at the University of Oxford
- Christina Maranci, art and architectural historian, Tufts University
- Louise Nalbandian (1926-1974), historian
- Vrej Nersessian (born 1948), priest, curator
- Christopher J. Walker (1942-2017), historian
- Dennis Papazian (1931-2023), Professor Emeritus and founding director of the Armenian Research Center at the University of Michigan, Dearborn
- Simon Payaslian, Professor of History at Boston University
- James R. Russell (born 1953)
- Alexander Sahinian (1910–1982), architectural historian
- Gagik Sarkisyan (1926–1998), historian
- John A. C. Greppin (1937–2016)
- Michael E. Stone (born 1938), professor emeritus of Armenian Studies and of Comparative Religion at the Hebrew University of Jerusalem
- Ronald Grigor Suny (born 1940), historian
- Jean-Michel Thierry (1916–2011)
- Giusto Traina (born 1959)
- Robert W. Thomson (1934–2018)
- Cyril Toumanoff (1913–1997)
- Bagrat Ulubabyan (1925–2001), writer and historian
- Armen Hakhnazarian (1941–2009), expert on architecture
- Samvel Karapetian (1961–2020), historian and expert on medieval architecture
- Bert Vaux (born 1968), linguist at University of Cambridge, expert on Armenian dialects, phonology
- Claude Mutafian (born 1942), historian
- Levon Zekiyan, scholar
- Artsvi Bakhchinyan (born 1971), philologist, film researcher
- Suren Yeremian (1908–1992), historian, cartographer
- Karen Yuzbashyan (1927–2009), historian, orientalist
- Ara Sanjian, historian
- Sebouh Aslanian, historian at UCLA, Richard Hovannisian Endowed Chair in Modern Armenian History
- Razmik Panossian (born 1964), political studies and history

== Armenian studies programs ==
=== Worldwide and online ===
- The Armenian Virtual College - AGBU
- Armenology Research National Center - ARNC
- Armenian Institute - AI

=== Austria ===
- University of Salzburg – Armenian Studies

=== Brazil ===
- University of São Paulo / Faculty of Armenian Language and Literature

=== Belgium ===
- Université Catholique de Louvain / Institut Orientaliste

=== Bulgaria ===
- Sofia University / Armenian and Caucasus Studies

=== Cyprus ===
- University of Cyprus

=== France ===
- Institut National des Langues et Civilisations Orientales

=== Iran ===
- University of Isfahan / Department of Armenian Studies
- Islamic Azad University, Central Tehran Branch / Armenian Language Department

=== Israel ===
- Hebrew University of Jerusalem – Armenian Studies Program

=== Germany ===
- Martin Luther University of Halle-Wittenberg – Oriental Institute / Department of Oriental Christian and Byzantine Studies,
- University of Jena – Caucasian Studies
- Ruhr University of Bochum – Foundation for Armenian Studies
- Leibniz Institute for the History and Culture of Eastern Europe (GWZO) - Publication series "Armenier im östlichen Europa – Armenians in Eastern Europe"

=== Hungary ===
- Pázmány Péter Catholic University - Department of Armenian Studies

=== Lebanon ===
- Haigazian University / Faculty of Humanities

=== Netherlands ===
- Universiteit Leiden – Department of Near Eastern Studies / Armenian Studies Program

=== Romania ===
- Babeș-Bolyai University – Institute of Armenology

=== Switzerland ===
- University of Geneva – Department of Mediterranean, Slavic, and Oriental Languages and Literatures (MESLO), Armenian Studies Programme

=== United Kingdom ===
- Oxford University / Faculty of Oriental Studies
- Programme of Armenian Studies, independent body based in London

=== United States ===
- Arizona State University / Russian and East European Studies Consortium
- Boston University
- California State University Fresno / Armenian Studies Program
- California State University Northridge / Department of Modern and Classical Languages and Literatures
- Clark University / Center for Holocaust and Genocide Studies
- Columbia University / Department of Middle Eastern and Asian Languages and Cultures
- Harvard University / Department of Near Eastern Languages and Civilizations
- Iona University / History and Political Science
- Rutgers University
- St. Nersess Armenian Seminary
- Tufts University / Armenian Art and Architectural History
- University of California at Berkeley / Institute of Slavic, East European, and Eurasian Studies
- University of California at Los Angeles / Department of Near Eastern Languages and Civilizations / Armenian Studies Program
- University of Chicago / Department of Near Eastern Languages and Civilizations
- University of Michigan at Ann Arbor / Armenian Studies Program
- University of Michigan–Dearborn / Armenian Research Center
- University of Southern California / Institute of Armenian Studies
- University of Wisconsin–Milwaukee
- Wesleyan University
- Worcester State College

== Research centers and associations ==
Name	Location	Date
Armenian Genocide Museum-Institute	Yerevan, Armenia	1995—
Armenology Research National Center (ARNC)	Yerevan, Armenia	2008—
Armenian Institute (AI)	London	2001—
Armenian International Policy Research Group (AIPRG)	Washington, DC and Yerevan	2006—
Armenian Library and Museum of America	Watertown, MA	1985—
Armenian National Institute	Washington, DC	1998—
Department of Armenian Studies	Haigazian University (Beirut, Lebanon)	
Division of Armenology and Social Sciences	Armenian National Academy of Sciences (Yerevan)	
Gomidas Institute	London and Princeton, NJ	1992—
International Association for Armenian Studies (IAAS)		1983—
Society for Armenian Studies	California State University, Fresno	1974—
National Association for Armenian Studies and Research (NAASR)	Belmont, MA	1955—
Nubarian Library (La Bibliothèque Nubarian)	Armenian General Benevolent Union (Paris)	1928—
MESROP - interdisciplinary workgroup for Armenian Studies	Martin-Luther-Universität Halle-Wittenberg, Halle, Germany	1998—
Société des Études Arméniennes (SEA)	Paris	1993—
Zoryan Institute	Cambridge, Massachusetts and Toronto	1982—

== Periodicals ==
Title	Date	Publisher	Location
Azgagrakan Handes	1895—1916	Yervand Lalayan	Tiflis, Shusha
Banber Yerevani Hamalsarani	1967—	Yerevan State University	Yerevan, Armenia
Bazmavep	1843—	Mekhitarist Congregation	Venice, Italy
Etchmiadzin (est. as Ararat)	1868/1944—	Mother See of Holy Etchmiadzin	Vagharshapat, Armenia
Fundamental Armenology	2015—	Armenian National Academy of Sciences (NASRA), sponsored by All Armenian Foundation Financing Armenological Studies; electronic biannual journal of NASRA, see fundamentalarmenology.am	Yerevan, Armenia
Haigazian Armenological Review	1970—	Haigazian University	Beirut, Lebanon
Handes Amsorya	1887—	Mekhitarist Congregation	Vienna, Austria
Hask Armenological Review	—	Holy See of Cilicia	Antelias, Lebanon
Journal of Armenian Studies	1975—	National Association for Armenian Studies & Research	Belmont, Massachusetts
Journal of the Society of Armenian Studies	1984—	California State University, Fresno	Fresno, California
Lraber Hasarakakan Gitutyunneri	1940—	Armenian National Academy of Sciences	Yerevan, Armenia
Patma-Banasirakan Handes	1958—	Armenian National Academy of Sciences	Yerevan, Armenia
Revue des Études Arméniennes	1920—	University of Paris	Paris, France
St. Nersess Theological Review	1996—	St. Nersess Armenian Seminary	Armonk, New York

== See also ==
- History of Armenia
- International relations#Area Studies
- Education in Armenia
