= Lraber Hasarakakan Gitutyunneri =

- Language: Armenian, Russian, English

Publication details
- Former name: Teghekagir. Hasarakakan gitutʻyunner
- History: 1940-present
- Publisher: Armenian National Academy of Sciences (Armenia)
- Frequency: Triannually

Standard abbreviations
- ISO 4: Lrab. Hasar. Gitut.

Indexing
- ISSN: 0320-8117
- LCCN: 91645088
- OCLC no.: 02505043

Links
- Journal homepage

Lraber Hasarakakan Gitutyunneri (Armenian: Լրաբեր հասարակական գիտությունների "Bulletin/Review of Social Sciences") is a triannual peer-reviewed academic journal published by the Armenian Academy of Sciences covering Armenian studies.

The journal's archives have undergone digitalization.

== See also ==
- Patma-Banasirakan Handes
- Bazmavep
- Haigazian Armenological Review
- Handes Amsorya
- Revue des Études Arméniennes
