= Ashkharhatsuyts =

Book by Anania Shirakatsi

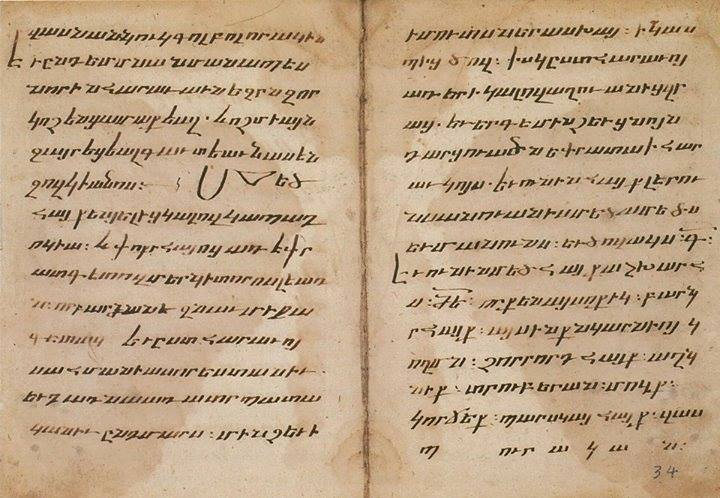
- Author: Anonymous (usually attributed to Anania Shirakatsi)
- Original title: Աշխարհացոյց
- Language: Classical Armenian
- Subject: Geography
- Publication date: 7th century
- Publication place: Armenia

Ashkharhatsuyts (Old Armenian: Աշխարհացոյց, romanized: Ašxarhacʽoycʽ), often translated as Geography in English sources, is an early medieval Armenian geography attributed to Anania Shirakatsi.

It believed to have been written sometime between 610 and 636. According to Elizabeth Redgate, it was written "probably shortly before AD 636". Its authorship has been disputed in the modern period; formerly believed to have been the work of Movses Khorenatsi, most scholars now attribute it to Anania Shirakatsi. Robert Hewsen calls it "one of the most valuable works to come down to us from Armenian antiquity."

The Armenian Geography—as it is alternatively known—has been especially important for research into the history and geography of Greater Armenia, the Caucasus (Georgia and Caucasian Albania) and the Sasanian Empire, which are all described in detail. The territories are described before the Arab invasions and conquests. The information on Armenia is not found elsewhere in historical sources, as it is the only known Armenian geographical work written before the 13th century.

The Ashkharhatsuyts has survived in long and short recensions. According to scholarly consensus, the long recension is the original. For the description of Europe, North Africa and Asia (all the known world from Spain to China), it largely uses Greek sources, namely the now lost geography of Pappus of Alexandria (4th century), which in turn, is based on the Geography of Ptolemy (2nd century). According to Hewsen, it is the "last work based on ancient geographical knowledge written before the Renaissance."

It was one of the earliest secular Armenian works to be published (in 1668 by Voskan Yerevantsi). It has been translated into four languages: English, Latin (both 1736), French (1819), and Russian (1877). In 1877, Kerovbe Patkanian first attributed it to Anania as the most probable author.

Another geographical work of Anania Shirakatsi, The Itinerary (Młonač῾ap῾k῾), may have been a part of the Ashkharhatsuyts. It presents six routes from Dvin, Armenia's capital at that time, to the major settlements in different directions, with distances in miles (młon), referring to the Arabic mile of 1,917.6 metres (6,291 ft), according to Hakob Manandian.

== See also ==
- Geography of Armenia
