= Ashot G. Abrahamian =

Soviet Armenian historian (1903–1983)

- Աշոտ Աբրահամյան
- Born: January 31, 1903; Ghushchi, Sharur-Daralayaz uezd, Erivan Governorate, Russian Empire
- Died: March 28, 1983 (aged 80); Yerevan, Armenian SSR, USSR
- Education: Gevorgian Seminary (1917); Yerevan State University (1933)
- Occupations: Historian, source scholar, university professor
- Employer(s): Yerevan State University and Etchmiadzin

Ashot Garegini Abrahamian (Armenian: Աշոտ Գարեգինի Աբրահամյան; January 31, 1903 – April 30, 1983) was a Soviet Armenian historian.

Abrahamian was born in the village of Kechut. After studying at an Armenian school in Nakhchivan and Gevorgian Seminary in Etchmiadzin, he worked as a priest in Khachik between 1920 and 1926. He studied history at Yerevan State University, graduating in 1933. Since 1938 until his death, he taught at the university in various positions.

His research areas included the works of medieval Armenian scholars such as Anania Shirakatsi, Hovhannes Imastaser. In 1944 he published the first complete collection of Shirakatsi's works after years of research at the Matenadaran.

He died in Yerevan.
