= Hellenizing School =

Early medieval school of translation

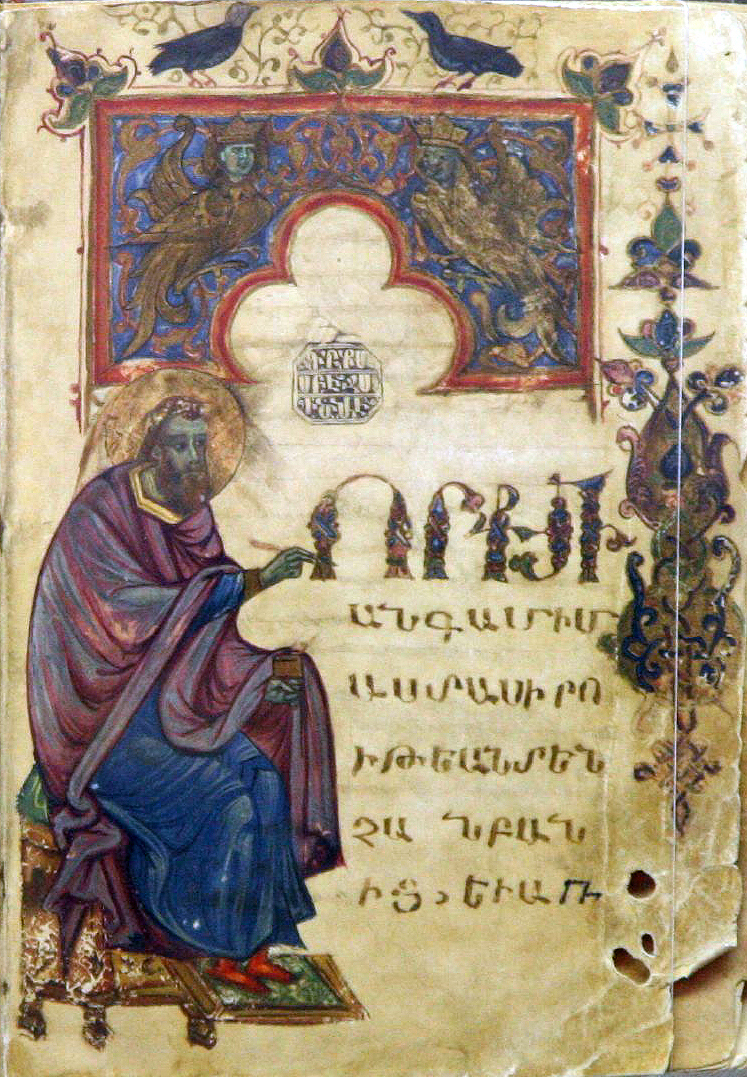
Illumination depicting David the Invincible, also known as David Anhaght, at the beginning of his Definition of Philosophy in a manuscript dating back to 1280.

The Hellenizing school (in Classical Armenian : Յունաբան Դպրոց, romanized Yownaban Dproc̕), also called the Philhellenic School, was an Armenian intellectual movement of the Early Middle Ages (5th–8th centuries). It was characterized by significant attention to Greek texts and notable translation work from Greek to Armenian, often performing literal translations from Greek. It substantially influenced the Armenian language.

The authors belonging to this school were involved in creating words and grammatical categories heavily inspired by Greek in Armenian. The translations carried out by the members of this school are interesting for philologists and modern researchers, as they preserved, in some cases, Greek texts lost in their original versions.

== Background ==
In the first part of the 5th century, Armenian adopted an alphabet for writing its language, traditionally attributed to Mesrop Mashtots. Historical analysis of the reasons behind this choice varies, but is generally understood as an attempt to expedite and facilitate the evangelization of Armenia by ecclesiastical authorities. Until that moment, religious texts had been exclusively in Greek and Syriac.

Following Mesrop Mashtots, who translated the New Testament into Armenian from Greek and Syriac sources, the Armenian Church undertook significant translation work. Initially, this involved religious literature, including liturgical and patristic texts, and later extended to Greek philosophical texts.

== History ==
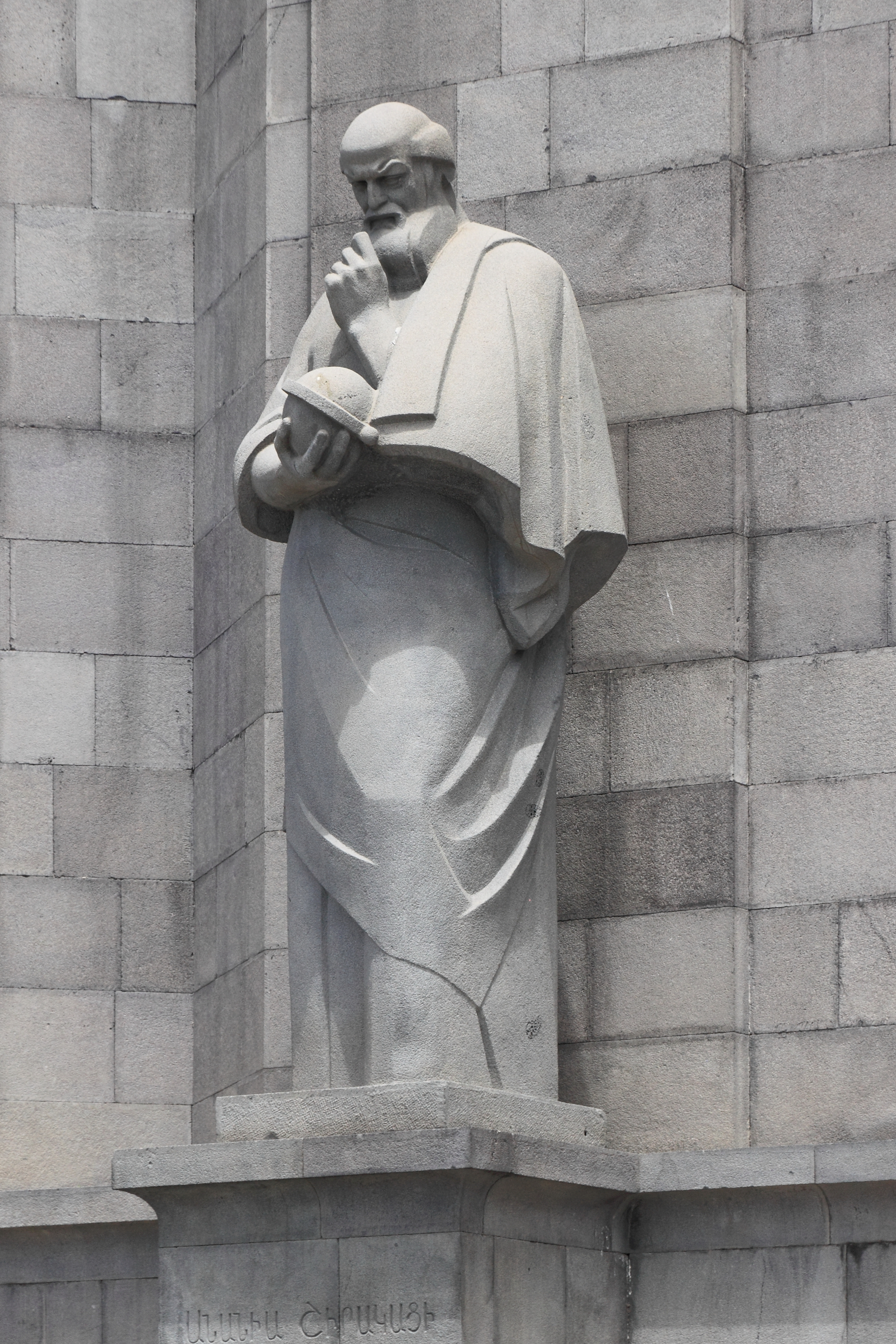
Statue depicting Anania of Shirak at the entrance of the Matenadaran.

In the pursuit of translations, from the late 5th century onward in Armenia, an intellectual movement called the "Hellenizing School" emerged. This school translated numerous works of Greek literature into Armenian. Some scholars consider that the early Armenian translations, including those by Mesrop Mashtots, are already part of this school and should be regarded as a "pre-Hellenizing School". This school significantly influenced the Armenian language, as the translators employed translation methods very close to the original Greek. Thus, they created Armenian words to translate certain Greek terms, devised prefixes and prepositions that did not exist in Armenian, and conceived of tenses and numbers, such as the dual or optative.

== Translations ==
The first works translated by this school were Dionysius Thrax's Grammar, Aelius Theon's Progymnasmata, the Book of Chries, a Christian version of Aphtonius's Progymnasmata. The school also translated a significant number of works from Greek patristic literature, including Irenaeus, which only survived in Greek fragments but had a complete version in Latin and Armenian.

The translators showed a particular interest in Platonic or Neoplatonic literature. Consequently, they translated Euthyphro, the Apology of Socrates, the Minos, the Laws, and the Timaeus. They also translated Aristotelian texts, such as On the Universe, On Virtues and Vices, the Categories, or On Interpretation. Additionally, translated works included the Hermetica attributed to Hermes Trismegistus, On Nature attributed to Zeno of Citium (but see Pseudo-Zeno), and the Book of Causes. Philo, John Philoponus, and Proclus were also authors translated extensively. The Armenian scholar Anania Shirakatsi wrote works on astronomy based on those of Basil of Caesarea and Aratus; he may have also produced an Armenian translation of Aratus's Phenomena.

David the Invincible, a philosopher writing in Greek during the 5th and 6th centuries, was translated into Armenian by this school and was erroneously thought by Armenians to have been a student of Mesrop Mashtots, the inventor of the Armenian alphabet.

== Philological interest ==
The fact that the translators of this movement remain very close to the original Greek, which serves as a model for their translations, makes the school interesting for modern philology. Scholars can rely on their work to try to restore the history of certain texts and even reconstruct lost originals, both for studies related to ancient philosophy, the Church Fathers, or the biblical text.

== Bibliography ==
- Terian, Abraham (1980). "The Hellenizing School: Its Time, Place, and Scope of Activities Reconsidered". In Nina Garsoïan; Thomas F. Mathews; Robert W. Thomson (eds.). East of Byzantium: Syria and Armenia in the Formative Period. Washington, D.C.: Dumbarton Oaks. pp. 175–186.
