= Kerovbe Patkanian =

Armenian linguist (1833–1889)

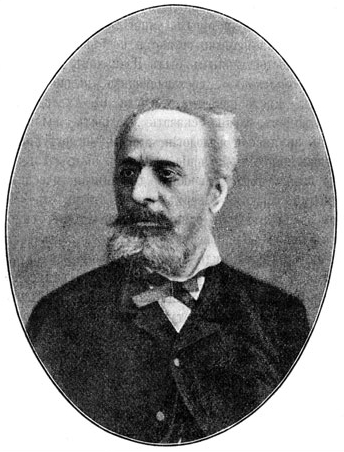

Kerovbe Patkanian or Kerope Petrovich Patkanov (Armenian: Քերովբէ Պատկանեան, (Note: Reformed orthography: Քերովբե Պատկանյան) Russian: Керопэ́ Петро́вич Патка́нов; (Note: Керопэ Петровичъ Паткановъ in pre-reform Russian orthography) 16 May [O.S. 4 May] 1833 – 14 April [O.S. 2 April] 1889) was a Russian Armenian philologist, linguist, orientalist, and historian who served as Professor of Armenian Studies at the Saint Petersburg Imperial University. He was born in Nakhichevan-on-Don (today part of Rostov-on-Don) into a noted family of scholars and educators. He published a number of works of medieval Armenian literature, some for the first time.

== Biography ==
Kerovbe Patkanian was born in Nakhichevan-on-Don (today part of Rostov-on-Don) on 16 May [O.S. 4 May] 1833 into a noted Armenian family of scholars and educators. His father, Petros Patkanian, was a priest, and his mother was the daughter of the educator and author Harutyun Alamdarian. He was the first cousin of writer Raphael Patkanian. He received his initial education at the Armenian school of Stavropol. In 1849, he graduated from the Lazarev Institute of Oriental Languages in Moscow, where he was taught by the renowned Armenologist Mkrtich (Nikita) Emin. He then graduated from the University of Dorpat and the Main Pedagogical Institute in Saint Petersburg in 1857. In December of that year, he became senior teacher at the Transcaucasian Institute for Girls (Zakavkazsky devichy institut) and soon married A. A. Akimova. Now provided for financially, he was able to focus on scholarship. In 1861, he joined the staff of the Department of Armenian Literature of the Saint Petersburg Imperial University, first as an (adjunct) professor and as a full professor after 1872. He headed the Department of Eastern Languages from 1861. He is credited with establishing Armenian philology as a subject of comprehensive study at the university; the "Petersburg school" of Armenian studies associated with Patkanian eventually included well-known scholars such as Nikolai Marr, Nicholas Adontz, Joseph Orbeli and others. In 1863, he successfully defended his master's thesis titled Opyt istorii dinastii Sasanidov po svedeniyam, soobshchayemym armyanskimi pisatelyami (An attempt at a history of the Sasanian dynasty according to the information reported by Armenian authors). In 1864, he obtained a doctoral degree for his work Issledovaniye o sostave armyanksogo yazyka (A study of the structure of the Armenian language). From 1872, he also served as the chief censor of Armenian publications of the Saint Petersburg Censorship Committee, in which capacity he is credited with playing a positive role in the development of Armenian publishing.

Patkanian studied Armenian manuscripts in the libraries of Etchmiadzin, Tiflis, Venice, Munich, Berlin, Paris and Vienna. He published a number of works of medieval Armenian literature, including for the first time the works of Gregory of Akner (1870) and Mkhitar of Ani (1879). He also published new editions of the works of Mekhitar of Ayrivank (1867), Sebeos (1879), Faustus (1883), and Tovma Artsruni (1887), which were of a higher quality than previous publications. He translated into Russian the works of Movses Kaghankatvatsi (1861), Sebeos (1862), Ghevond (1862), Mekhitar of Ayrivank (1869), Petros di Sargis Gilanents (1870), Maghakia Abegha (1871), Tovma Artsruni (1887), and the Armenian geography Ashkharhatsuyts (1877, with the original Armenian text). He also compiled and translated information about the Mongols from Armenian histories (2 vols., 1873–74). According to Meri Saghian and Maxim Katvalian, Patkanian's translations "are characterized by closeness to the original text, a high level of scientific rigor, [and] they are accompanied by additional information, comments and annotations." He also wrote bibliographies and studies of medieval Armenian authors and their works. In his Opyt istorii dinastii Sasanidov and the work O mnimom pokhode Taklat-Palasara k beregam Inda (On the supposed campaign of Tiglath-Pileser to the shores of the Indus, 1879), Patkanian addressed a number of key questions in the ancient and medieval history of the Middle East. Patkanian also studied the Urartian cuneiform inscriptions discovered in Armenia and wrote a number of works about them.

In his doctoral dissertation Issledovaniye o sostave armyanksogo yazyka, Patkanian studies the origin, development and other characteristics of the Armenian language using the methods of historical and comparative linguistics. Patkanian considered Classical Armenian to be the ancient spoken language of the Ayrarat province of Greater Armenia, serving as the official or common language of the Armenian people during the existence of the ancient Armenian kingdom and as the Armenian literary language from the fifth to the nineteenth century. He contributed to the study of Armenian dialects in his work Issledovaniye o dialektakh armyanskogo yazyka (Study on the dialects of the Armenian Language, 1869), for which Armenologist H. Dashian called him "the father of Armenian dialectology." These works include stories, fairy tales, and oral traditions in the dialects of Mush, Khoy, Agulis, Julfa, and Karabakh. Patkanian considered the Armenian dialects to be the descendants of the ancient tribal languages of Armenia. In his view, Classical Armenian did not experience new development down to the nineteenth century and maintained its original grammatical structure, and it was not the living, spoken language of the Armenian people from the fifth to the nineteenth century. In his work O meste, zanimayemom armyanskim yazykom v krugu indoyevropeyskikh (The place occupied by the Armenian language among the Indo-European languages, 1879), Patkanian concluded that Armenian is a unique representative of an unknown branch of the Indo-European language family located between the Iranian and Slavic languages. He collected materials for an Armenian explanatory dictionary and a dictionary of Armenian personal names (Materialy dlya armyanskogo slovari, parts 1–2, 1882–84), but this work remained unfinished. In a number of articles, he argued against what he viewed as unnecessary purism in the Armenian language. Patkanian died in Saint Petersburg on 14 April [O.S. 2 April] 1889.

== Selected works ==
A bibliography of Patkanian's works can be found in Marr 1898, pp. 94–97.

- (1860) "Catalogue de la littérature arménienne, depuis le commencement du IV siècle jusque vers le milieu du XVII siècle" [Catalog of Armenian literature, from the beginning of the 4th century to the middle of the 17th century]. Bulletin de l'Académie impériale des sciences de St.-Pétersbourg (in French). 2: 49–91.
- (1861) Istorīia Agvan Moĭseia Kagankatvatsi, pisatelia X vieka Исторія Агванъ Мойсея Каганкатваци, писателя X вѣка. Saint Petersburg: Tipografīia Imperatorskoĭ Akademīi nauk. The first Russian translation of the Classical Armenian history of Caucasian Albania attributed to Movses Kaghankatvatsi.
- (1861–1863) "Armenia," "Arsacids" and a number of other articles on Armenian geography, history and literature in the Russian encyclopedia Ėntsikopedicheskīĭ slovar', sostavlennyĭ russkimi uchënymi i literatorami Энциклопедическій словарь, составленный русскими учёными и литераторами [Encyclopedic dictionary composed by Russian scholars and litterateurs].
- (1863) Opyt istorīi dinastīi Sasanidov po sviedienіiam, soobshchaemym armianskimi pisateliami Опытъ исторіи династіи Сасанидовъ по свѣдѣніямъ, сообщаемымъ армянскими писателами [An attempt at a history of the Sasanian dynasty according to the information reported by Armenian authors]. Saint Petersburg: Tipografīia Imperatorskoĭ Akademīi nauk.
- (1869) Izsliedovanīe o dīalektakh armianskago iazyka: Filologicheskīĭ opyt Изслѣдованіе о діалектахъ армянскаго языка. Филологическій опытъ [Study of the dialects of the Armenian language: a philological attempt]. Saint Petersburg: Tipografīia Imperatorskoĭ Akademīi nauk.
- (1877) Armianskaia geografīia VII vieka po R. Kh. (pripisyvavshaiasia Moiseiu Khorenskomu) Армянская географія VII вѣка по Р. Х. (приписывавшаяся Моисею Хоренскому) [Armenian geography of the 7th century AD (attributed to Movses Khorenatsi)]. Saint Petersburg: Tipografīia Imperatorskoĭ Akademīi nauk. Publication of the original Armenian text and Russian translation of the work of geography Ashkharhatsuyts (formerly attributed to Movses Khorenatsi). Patkanian was the first to suggest Anania Shirakatsi as the likely author of this work.
- (1879) O mnimom pokhodie Taklat-Palasara k beregam Inda О мнимомъ походѣ Таклатъ-Паласара къ берегамъ Инда [On the supposed campaign of Tiglath-Pileser to the shores of the Indus]. Saint Petersburg: Tipografīia brat. Panteleevykh.
- (1880) Bibliograficheskīĭ ocherk armianskoĭ istoricheskoĭ literatury Библиографическій очеркъ армянской исторической литературы [Bibliographical outline of Armenian historical literature]. Saint Petersburg: Tipografīia Imperatorskoĭ Akademīi nauk.
- (1887) Tsygany: Nieskolʹko slov o nariechiiakh zakavkazskikh tsygan: bosha i karachi Цыганы: Нѣсколько словъ о нарѣчіяхъ закавказскихъ цыганъ: боша и карачи [Gypsies: a few words about the dialects of the Transcaucasian Gypsies: Bosha and Karachi]. Saint Petersburg: Tipografīia Imperatorskoĭ Akademīi nauk.
