= Patma-Banasirakan Handes =

- Discipline: Armenian studies
- Language: Armenian, Russian
- Edited by: Vardkes Mikayelyan

Publication details
- History: 1958–present
- Publisher: Armenian National Academy of Sciences (Armenia)
- Frequency: Quarterly

Standard abbreviations
- ISO 4: Patma-Banasirakan Handes

Indexing
- ISSN: 0135-0536
- OCLC no.: 470223840

Patma-Banasirakan Handes (Armenian: Պատմա-Բանասիրական Հանդես (ՊԲՀ, PBH); Russian: Историко-филологический журнал, Istoriko-Filologicheskii Zhurnal; lit. 'Historical-Philological Journal') is a quarterly peer-reviewed academic journal published by the Armenian National Academy of Sciences. It covers research on Armenian history (particularly material related to the ancient and medieval periods), art history, literature, and linguistics. The journal also publishes discussions and debates, book reviews and also has special sections devoted to science news and Armenian Diasporan affairs. It occasionally publishes obituaries and biographies and commemorates the lives of noted scholars involved in Armenian studies. It is the Academy's "flagship journal".

It was established in 1958 by academician Mkrtich G. Nersisyan, who was the journal's first editor-in-chief until his death in 1999. According to Razmik Panossian "it became a trend-setting journal for historians, linguists, philologists and for scholars in the humanities in general. This influential journal brought together all branches of Armenian studies, systematically consolidating research on culture, ancient law and philosophy, architecture, language and history."

Most articles that were published in Armenian during the Soviet era included a Russian abstract, while those articles published in Russian had an Armenian abstract. In recent years, following Armenia's independence in 1991, most articles have come to include English abstracts.

The journal's archives have recently undergone digitalization and articles can now be accessed from its official website. The current editor is Vardkes Mikayelyan.

== See also ==
- Lraber Hasarakakan Gitutyunneri
- Bazmavep
- Haigazian Armenological Review
- Handes Amsorya
- Revue des Études Arméniennes
