= Handes Amsorya =

Handes Amsorya Հանդէս Ամսօրեայ
- Cover
- Publisher: Mechitarist order
- First issue: 1887
- Country: Austria
- Based in: Vienna
- Language: Armenian

Handes Amsorya (Հանդէս Ամսօրեայ, Monthly Review) is an academic journal that publishes research papers and articles on Armenian studies, especially history, art, social sciences, linguistics, and philology. It was established in 1887 by the Mechitarian order in Vienna.

== See also ==
- Bazmavep
- Haigazian Armenological Review
- Patma-Banasirakan Handes
- Revue des Études Arméniennes
