= S. Peter Cowe =

S. Peter Cowe is Narekatsi Professor of Armenian Studies at UCLA and has taught at the Hebrew University of Jerusalem, University of Chicago, and Columbia University. He is also a writer, researcher.

His research interests include medieval Armenian history, modern Armenian nationalism, and Armenian film and theater. The author of five books in the field and the editor of four others, in 2013 he was preparing a study on the earliest extant Armenian play from the seventeenth century. A regular contributor to Armenological journals, he is the editor of the Journal of the Society for Armenian Studies and has received a grant from the National Council on Eurasian and East European Research to investigate the post-Soviet publishing industry in Armenia. He is fluent in French, German, Greek and Armenian.

== Books ==
- Commentary on the Divine Liturgy by Xosrov Anjewatsi (1991)
- The Armenian Version of Daniel (1992)
- Mxitar Sasnetsi's Theological Discourses (1993)
- The Armenian Manuscripts (1994)
- The Deaconess in the Armenian Church (1994), translator
- Evans, Helen C. & Wixom, William D. (1997). The glory of Byzantium: art and culture of the Middle Byzantine era, A.D. 843-1261. New York: The Metropolitan Museum of Art. ISBN 9780810965072. (includes an essay by Cowe)
- Modern Armenian Drama: An Anthology, co-editor & part. (2001)
