= John A. C. Greppin =

American linguist

- Born: April 2, 1937; Rochester, New York
- Died: May 3, 2016 (aged 79); Cleveland, Ohio
- Citizenship: US
- Spouse: Mary E. Greppin (Hannan)
- Awards: Distinguished Faculty Award for Research by Cleveland State University
- Scientific career
- Fields: Armenian studies

John Aird Coutts Greppin (April 2, 1937 – May 3, 2016) was an American scholar of Armenian studies, linguist, and a professor at the Cleveland State University.

== Biography ==
He attended the Allendale School in Rochester, New York, Dartmouth College, and University of Rochester. Greppin received a Ph.D. in Indo-European Studies at the University of California-Los Angeles in 1972. He taught Greek and Latin at the Woodstock Country School in South Woodstock, Vermont, Latin at Ruffing Montessori in Cleveland Heights, Ohio, and was a professor at Cleveland State University from 1975 to 2010. Greppin was an author of 16 books and 500 articles and reviews. His academic specialty was Classical Armenian. He spent a year in Soviet Armenia on a State Department grant in 1974-75. In 1998 he spent a semester in Göttingen, Germany as a visiting professor. He founded the Annual of Armenian Linguistics and edited it for 25 years. He also co-edited Raft, a Journal of Armenian Poetry and Criticism.

In 2013 he donated his Armenian collection to the National Association for Armenian Studies and Research (NAASR) library.

With his wife Mary E. Greppin (Hannan) they had two children.

== Awards ==
- Distinguished Faculty Award for Research, Cleveland State University (2010)

== Works ==
- The Diffusion of Greco-Roman Medicine into the Middle East and the Caucasus. Emilie Savage-Smith (Editor), John L. Gueriguian (Editor), John AC Greppin (Editor). 1999. ISBN 9780882060965
- Handbook of Armenian Dialectology (Anatolian and Caucasian studies). by John A. C. Greppin, Amalya Khachaturyan, New York : Caravan, 1986, 253 p.
- "Bark Galianosi": The Greek-Armenian Dictionary to Galen. Author: John AC Greppin. December 1985. ISBN 9780882060644
- Interrogativity: A Colloquium on the Grammar, Typology, and Pragmatics of Questions in Seven Diverse Languages, Cleveland, Ohio, October 5th, 1981-May 3rd, 1982. Author: John AC Greppin, Louis Tonko Milic, William Chisholm. January 1984. ISBN 9027228647;
- Studies in Classical Armenian Literature (Anatolian and Caucasian Studies), by John A. C. Greppin, 1994, 261 p. ISBN 0882060805
