= Edward Jrbashian =

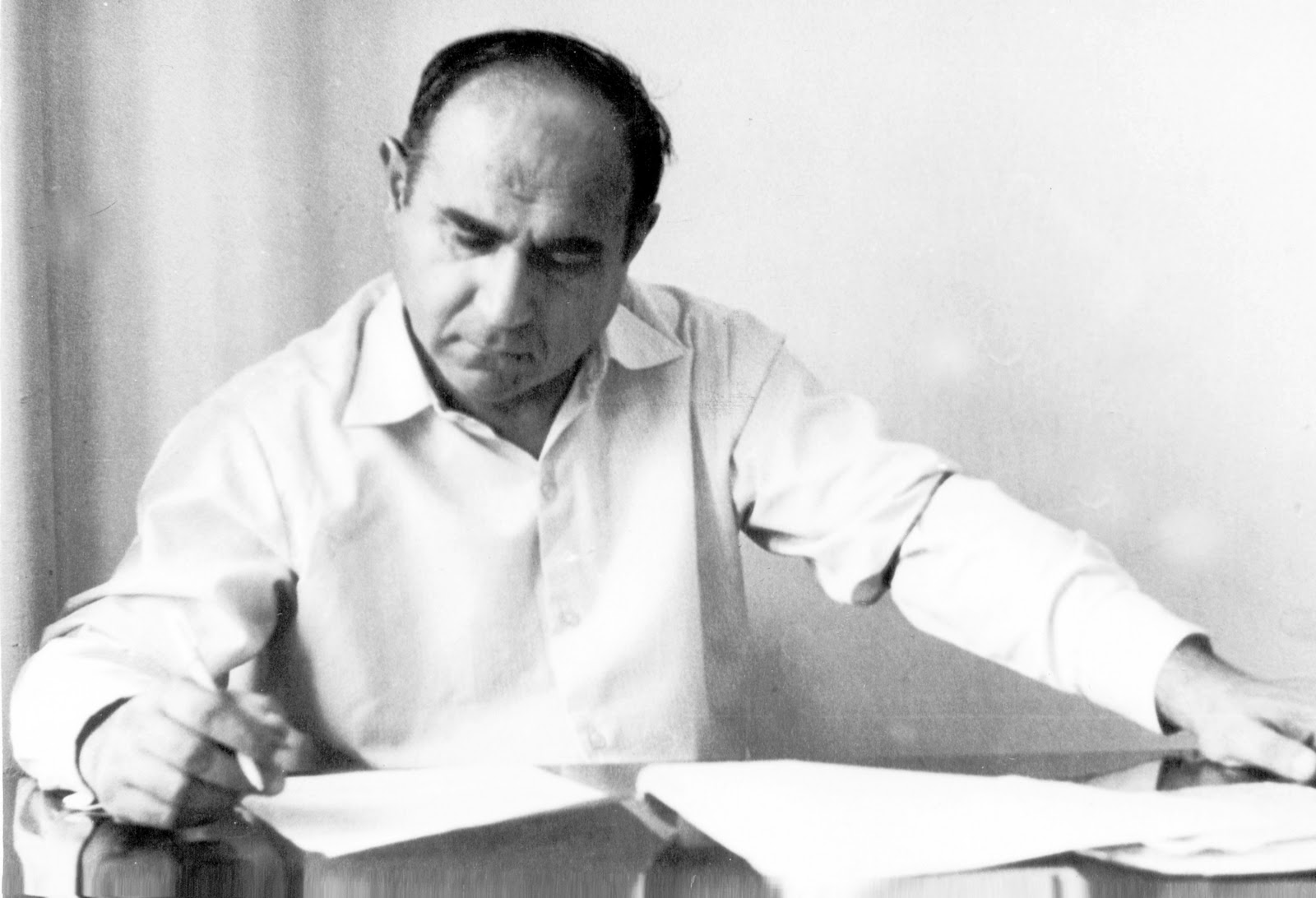
Image of Edvard Jrbashyan

Edward Jrbashyan (Armenian: Էդվարդ Ջրբաշյան; 1923–1999) was an Armenian literary critic, recognized as one of the most important literary critics in Soviet Armenia. A professor at the Yerevan State University, Jrbashyan directed the Abeghian Literature Institute of the Armenian National Academy of Sciences.

He was noted for his numerous works on Armenia's national poet Hovhannes Tumanyan.
