= Revue des Études Arméniennes =

- Discipline: Armenian studies, Byzantine studies, Oriental studies, patristics
- Language: French (English abstracts), English, German
- Edited by: Aram Mardirossian, Nina Garsoian, Jean-Pierre Mahé

Publication details
- History: 1920–present
- Publisher: Sorbonne University, Section des Sciences Historiques et Philologiques (France)
- Frequency: Annually

Standard abbreviations
- ISO 4: Rev. Études Armén.

Indexing
- ISSN: 0080-2549 (print); 1783-1741 (web)
- OCLC no.: 1605433

Links
- Journal homepage

Revue des Études Arméniennes is a peer-reviewed academic journal that publishes articles relating to Classical and medieval Armenian history, art history, philology, linguistics, and literature. The Revue was established in 1920 at the initiative of French scholars Frédéric Macler and Antoine Meillet. Meillet himself wrote many of the articles during the formative years of the journal (1920–1933), which typically covered Armenian history, grammar, and folk tales, including the modern period. The Revue was not published from 1934 to 1963.

In 1964, thanks to the efforts of the Paris-based Armenian scholar Haïg Berbérian (1887–1978), the journal was revived. Berbérian was able to secure the financial backing of the Calouste Gulbenkian Foundation for the journal's publication, and the first volume of the "Nouvelle série" appeared under his editorship in 1964. However, the publication of articles on the modern period of Armenian history was abandoned, and the journal has since limited its scope from ancient to early modern period history (that is, until roughly the eighteenth century).

Up until 1933, articles were published in French, but when publication resumed articles were also published in English and German. The journal uses the Hübschmann-Meillet-Benveniste system in the transcription of Armenian words into Latin characters. In addition to scholarly articles, it also publishes book reviews.

The former editors of the journal during the new series were Émile Benveniste (nominally, 1964-1975, as Berbérian was responsible for much of the editing during this time), Georges Dumézil (1975-1980), and Sirarpie Der-Nersessian (1981–1989). Its current editor is Aram Mardirossian.

== See also ==
- Armenian studies
- Bazmavep
- Haigazian Armenological Review
- Handes Amsorya
- Patma-Banasirakan Handes
