= Robert H. Hewsen =

American historian (1934–2018)

- Born: May 20, 1934; New York City, US
- Died: November 17, 2018; Fresno, California
- Education: Georgetown University
- Known for: Armenia: A Historical Atlas (2001)
- Scientific career
- Fields: History of Armenia and the Caucasus
- Workplaces: Rowan University
- Doctoral advisor: Cyril Toumanoff

Robert H. Hewsen (born Hewsenian; May 20, 1934 – November 17, 2018) was an American historian and professor of history at Rowan University. He was an expert on the ancient history of the South Caucasus. Hewsen is the author of Armenia: A Historical Atlas (2001), a major reference book, acclaimed as an important achievement in Armenian studies.

== Biography ==
Hewsen was born Robert H. Hewsenian in New York City in 1934. His Armenian father came to the U.S. from Smyrna (now Izmir).

He spent seven years in Europe with the US Air Force and studying. He received his B.A. in history from the University of Maryland and his Ph.D. from Georgetown University in 1967. The same year he joined the history department of Rowan University, where he taught Byzantine and Russian history for more than 30 years. After retiring from Rowan University in July 1999, Professor Hewsen lectured at University of Chicago, Columbia University, California State University, Fresno and University of California, Los Angeles.

He was the president of the Society for Armenian Studies in 1988–89. He was also the co-founder and president of the Society for the Study of Caucasia, which was active from 1989 to 1997.

== Works ==
Hewsen wrote many books and articles on the history of the Caucasus, especially Armenia. His seminal contribution to the field is Armenia: A Historical Atlas (2001). The book received wide critical acclaim. Michael E. Stone said it "has no rival in Armenian studies", calling it a "pioneering and largely definitive work" and the "best atlas of Armenia ever prepared." Merrill D. Peterson wrote that it "may by itself be considered a monument of American scholarship." Nina Garsoian also described it as monumental. Charles King wrote that the book is an "outstanding achievement not only as a geographical reference but also as a guide to the demographic and political history of the entire Caucasus." Adam T. Smith wrote of the Atlas as "an important milestone in the development of Armenian studies."

Books

- Armenia: A Historical Atlas. University of Chicago Press. 2001. ISBN 978-0-226-33228-4.
- The Geography of Ananias of Širak (Ašxarhacʻoycʻ): The Long and the Short Recensions. Wiesbaden: Dr. Ludwig Reichert Verlag. 1992. ISBN 3-88226-485-3.

Book chapters

- Samuelian, Thomas J., ed (1982). "Ethno-History and the Armenian influence upon the Caucasian Albanians". Classical Armenian Culture. Influences and Creativity. Philadelphia: Scholars Press.
- Samuelian, Thomas J.; Stone, Michael E., eds. (1984). "The Kingdom of Arc'ax". Medieval Armenian Culture. University of Pennsylvania Armenian Texts and Studies. Chico, California: Scholars Press.

Articles

- "Introduction to Armenian Historical Geography IV: The Vitaxates of Arsacid Armenia. A Reexamination of the Territorial Aspects of the institution (Part Two). Revue des Études Arméniennes (Nouvelles série) vol. 22 (1990-91)
- "Introduction to Armenian Historical Geography IV: The Vitaxates of Arsacid Armenia. A Reexamination of the Territorial Aspects of the institution (Part One). Revue des Études Arméniennes (Nouvelles série) vol. 21 (1988-89)
- "Achaemenid «Armina»". Revue des Études Arméniennes (Nouvelles série) vol. 17 (1983).
- "Ptolemy on Armenia". Revue des Études Arméniennes (Nouvelles série) vol. 15 (1981).
- "The Synchronistic Table of Ps. Sebēos". Revue des Études Arméniennes (Nouvelles série) vol. 15 (1981).
- "The Meliks Of Eastern Armenia IV". Revue des Études Arméniennes (Nouvelles série) vol. 14 (1980).
- "The Meliks Of Eastern Armenia III". Revue des Études Arméniennes (Nouvelles série) vol. 11 (1975).
- "The Meliks of Eastern Armenia II". Revue des Études Arméniennes (Nouvelles série) vol. 10 (1973-4).
- "The Meliks of Eastern Armenia. A Preliminary Study". Revue des Études Arméniennes (Nouvelles série) vol. 9 (1972).
- "The Successors of Tiridates the Great: A Contribution to the History of Armenia in the Fourth Century". Revue des Études Arméniennes (Nouvelles série) vol. 13 (1978/79).
- Hewsen, Robert H. (Spring 1968). "Science in Seventh-Century Armenia: Ananias of Širak". Isis. 59 (1): 32–45. doi:10.1086/350333. S2CID 145014073.
- "On the date and autorship of the Ašxarhac'uyc'" Revue des Études Arméniennes (Nouvelles série) vol. 4 (1967).
- "Armenia according to Ašxarhac'uyc'". Revue des Études Arméniennes (Nouvelles série) vol. 2 (1965).
- "On the Alphabet of the Caucasian Albanians". Revue des Études Arméniennes (Nouvelles série) vol. 1 (1964).
- "The Autumn Glossary". Armenian Review. 13 (3): 90–93. Autumn 1960.
- "The Legend of Akhtamar (A Ballad)". Armenian Review. 12 (2): 64–66. Summer 1959.
- Anatolia and Historical Concepts // The California Institute for Ancient Studies, a Velikovskian site
- North Central Armenia, I: The Principality of Tayk. (Article, perhaps unpublished)
- On the Identity of Peter, [Georgian] Bishop of Maiuma. (Article, perhaps unpublished)
