= Hovhannes Imastaser =

Armenian multidisciplinary scholar

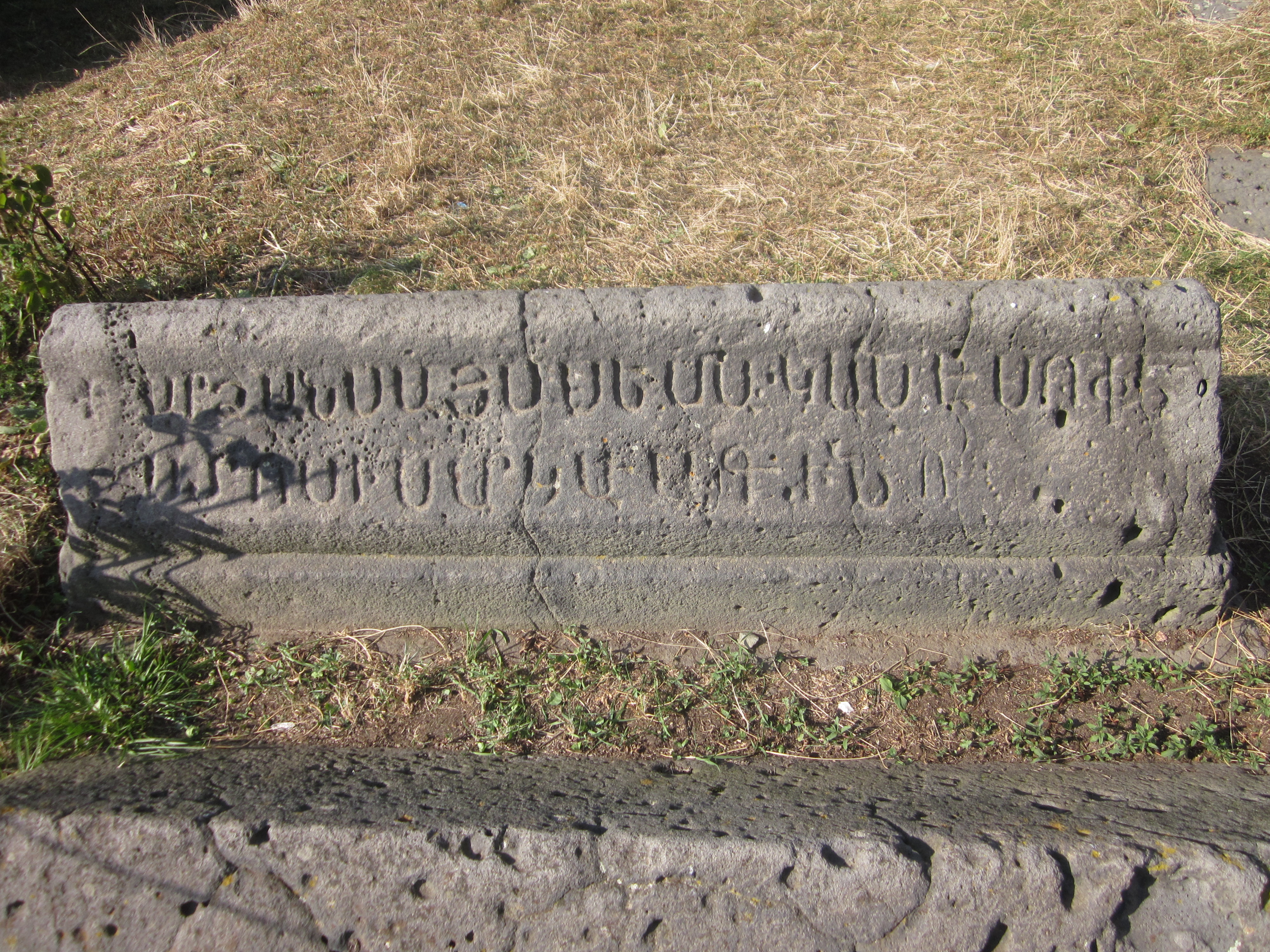
Gravestone of Hovhannes Imastaser at Haghpat Monastery with the inscription "This monument [ardzans, lit. 'statue'] is the grave [semakan, lit. 'threshold'] of Sophestos Sarkavag [two of Hovhannes's epithets]."

Hovhannes Imastaser (c. 1045–50 – 1129), also known as Hovhannes Sarkavag, (Note: Armenian: Յովհաննէս Իմաստասէր, romanized: Yovhannēs Imastasēr, lit. 'John the Philosopher/Scholar'; Յովհաննէս Սարկաւագ, 'John the Deacon') was a medieval Armenian multi-disciplinary scholar known for his works on philosophy, theology, mathematics, cosmology, and literature. He was also a gifted hymnologist and pedagogue.

== Biography ==
Hovhannes Imastaser was born in c. 1045–50 into a priest's family. Varying information exists about his birthplace. Vardan Areveltsi writes that he was from the district of Parisos (historically also known as Gardman, in modern-day northwestern Azerbaijan). Kirakos Gandzaketsi reports that Hovhannes was "from the land of Gandzak, like me." Parisos was a part of the Emirate of Ganja (Gandzak) at the time, so these reports may be compatible. An anonymous hagiography of Hovhannes refers to Ani as "his own city" and "the place of [his] upbringing"; thus, Manuk Abeghian thought it possible that Ani was Hovhannes's actual birthplace, or that he was born in Parisos and was raised in Ani. Ashot Abrahamian considers it most likely that Hovhannes was born in the district of Parisos.

Hovhannes received his education in theology and science at Haghbat, and possibly also at Sanahin, two important monastic centers of Armenian medieval scholarship. His teacher was his maternal uncle, who was nicknamed Urchetsi vardapet (archimandrite, Doctor of Theology). He was probably ordained as a sarkavag (deacon) early on in Haghbat. Hovhannes eventually rose to become a vardapet of the Armenian Church. But it was the title sarkavag, however, that became attached to his name, probably because he had held that rank for a long time. (In some manuscripts of his works, he is called by both titles: "Hovhannes Sarkavag vardapet.")

After completing his education, Hovhannes moved to the former Armenian capital city of Ani, where he taught philosophy, mathematics, music, cosmography and grammar. One of his students was the chronicler Samuel of Ani. He also served as the parish priest at the cathedral of Ani. For his learnedness, he received the epithets Imastaser ('the Philosopher/Scholar'), Poetikos ('the Poet'), and Sophestos ('the Wise'); the latter appears on the inscription on his gravestone. Hovhannes is said to have been a respected figure at the court of Georgia and among the Georgian clergy. After many years in Ani, Hovhannes returned to Haghbat and headed the school there. Ashot Abrahamian suggests that Hovhannes wrote most of works in his old age, while at the monastery. He died in Haghbat in 1129.

=== Discourse on Wisdom ===
Discourse on Wisdom (Ban Imastutian) is regarded as Hovhannes Imastaser's principal philosophical poem. Written as a dialogue between the author and a blackbird, it combines poetic expression with reflections on knowledge, nature, human understanding, and divine wisdom. Modern scholarship has interpreted the work as illustrating the interaction of classical philosophical traditions with Christian theology within medieval Armenian intellectual culture. According to Stephen Peter Cowe, the poem exemplifies the creative synthesis that characterized the intellectual revival associated with eleventh- and twelfth-century Armenia, while also demonstrating Hovhannes' effort to reconcile rational inquiry with religious thought.

== Works ==
While Hovhannes Imastaser was recognized as a master of Armenian literature, his works acquired wider publicity only in the 19th century when they were published by Abbot Ghevont Alishan, a member of the Mekhitarist Congregation in Venice. Imastaser's innovative approach to literature, for which he is often referred to as a key representative of the medieval Armenian literary renaissance, is fully demonstrated in his poem Ban Imastutian (Discourse on wisdom). In the poem, written as a dialogue between the author and a blackbird, the bird symbolizes nature, which, per the author, is the main inspiration behind art. In Imastaser's time, artistic inspiration was usually attributed to divine reasons.

As a hymnologist, Imastaser wrote several important sharakans (hymns): Tagh Harutean (Ode to the Resurrection), Paytsaratsan Aysor (They brightened on this day), Anskizbn Bann Astvatz (God, the infinite word), Anchareli Bann Astavatz (God, the inexpressible word). The latter two are acrostic compositions, each encompassing within their ten stanzas thirty-six letters of the Armenian Alphabet. In them, Imastaser glorifies heroes and martyrs who sacrificed their lives defending Armenian homeland and their Christian faith. Imastaser also introduced another patriotic theme to Armenian literature and music: emigration. In his hymns Imastaser prays to God so that Armenians who left their country could find strength to return home.

Hovhannes Imastaser also contributed to the standardization of the Armenian prayer book and Psalter.

Hovhannes Imastaser's work in mathematics is represented by the volume Haghaks Ankiunavor Tvots (Concerning Polygonal Numbers). This work indicates a profound knowledge of all important ancient and medieval mathematicians, including Pythagoras, Euclid and Aristotle. Hovhannes Imastaser translated into Armenian the works of the following classical scholars: Philo of Alexandria, Dionysius the Areopagite, Gregory of Nyssa, Porphyry, and, as mentioned, Aristotle and Euclid.

In 1084, Hovhannes Imastaser became involved in the project of developing so-called Minor Armenian Calendar, which included all 365 days plus one additional day. Eventually, his work on calendars led to the invention of a perpetual or eternal calendar.

Hovhannes Imastaser recognized the importance of the empirical method in science. 150 years before Roger Bacon, he noted: "Without experimentation, no opinion can be considered probable and acceptable; only experiment produces confirmation and certainty."
