= Sen Arevshatyan =

Armenian scholar (1928-2014)

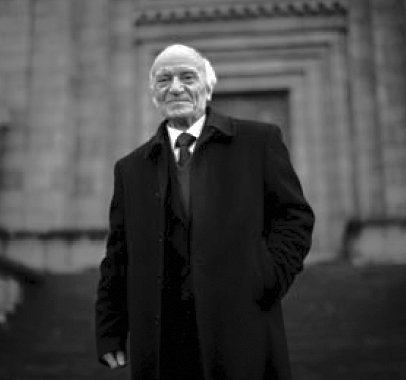
- Born: January 7, 1928; Yerevan, Armenian Soviet Socialist Republic
- Died: July 25, 2014 (aged 86); Yerevan, Armenia
- Citizenship: Armenia
- Scientific career
- Fields: History

Sen Sureni Arevshatyan (Armenian: Սեն Սուրենի Արևշատյան, 7 January 1928 – 25 July 2014) was an Armenian scholar, whose works are devoted to the history of ancient and medieval Armenian philosophy and historical sources. He also specialized in the publication of critical texts and scientific translations of medieval works. His research focused on the 5th century philosopher David the Invincible.

Arevshatyan was a member of the Paris-based International Academy “Ararat” since 1993 and the International Academy of Natural and Social Sciences. He was the founder and chairman of the Cultural Found of Armenia (1986–1989) and an Honored Citizen of Yerevan. Arevshatyan was awarded the State Prize of the Armenian SSR in 1978. He was a member of Armenian Academy of Sciences presidium, ex-director of Matenadaran for more than two decades.
