= Haigazian Armenological Review =

- Discipline: Armenia
- Language: English

Publication details
- History: 1970–present
- Frequency: Annually

Standard abbreviations
- ISO 4: Haigazian Armen. Rev.

Links
- Journal homepage

The Haigazian Armenological Review is an annual academic journal specializing in Armenian studies.

It was established in 1970 by the Department of Armenian Studies at Haigazian University and publishes articles on Armenian studies in Armenian, English, French, Arabic, and occasionally other languages.
