= David the Invincible =

6th-century neoplatonist philosopher

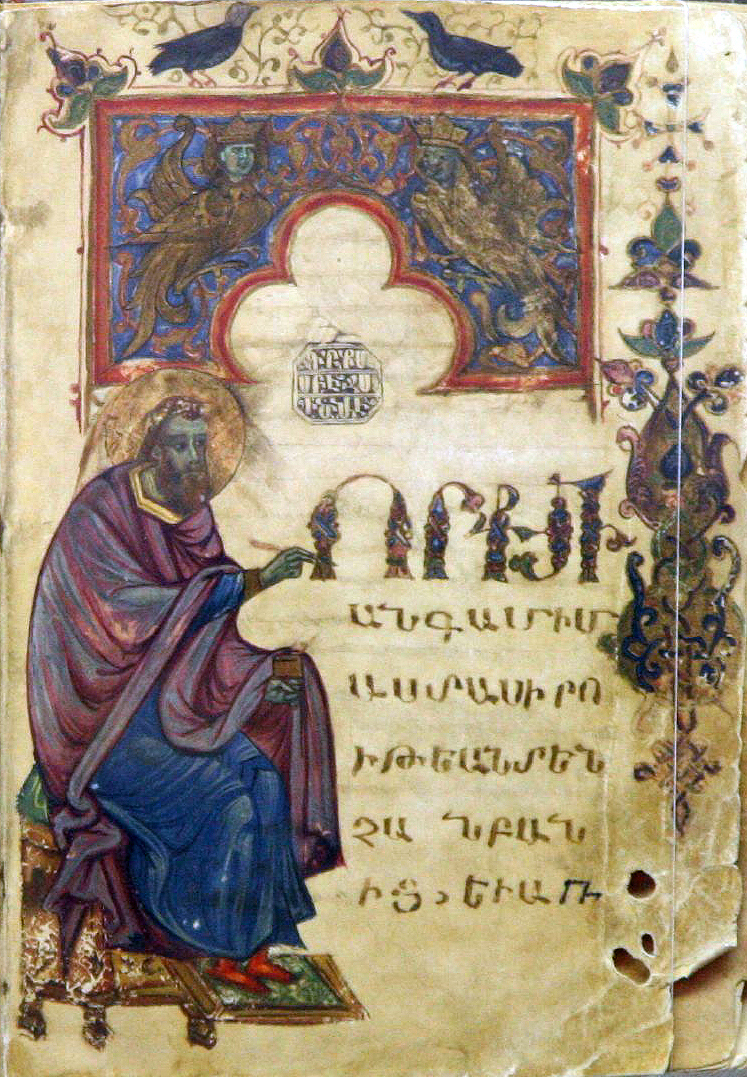
David the Invincible depicted in medieval manuscript of Definition of Philosophy (Matenadaran, Ms. 1746, c. 1280)

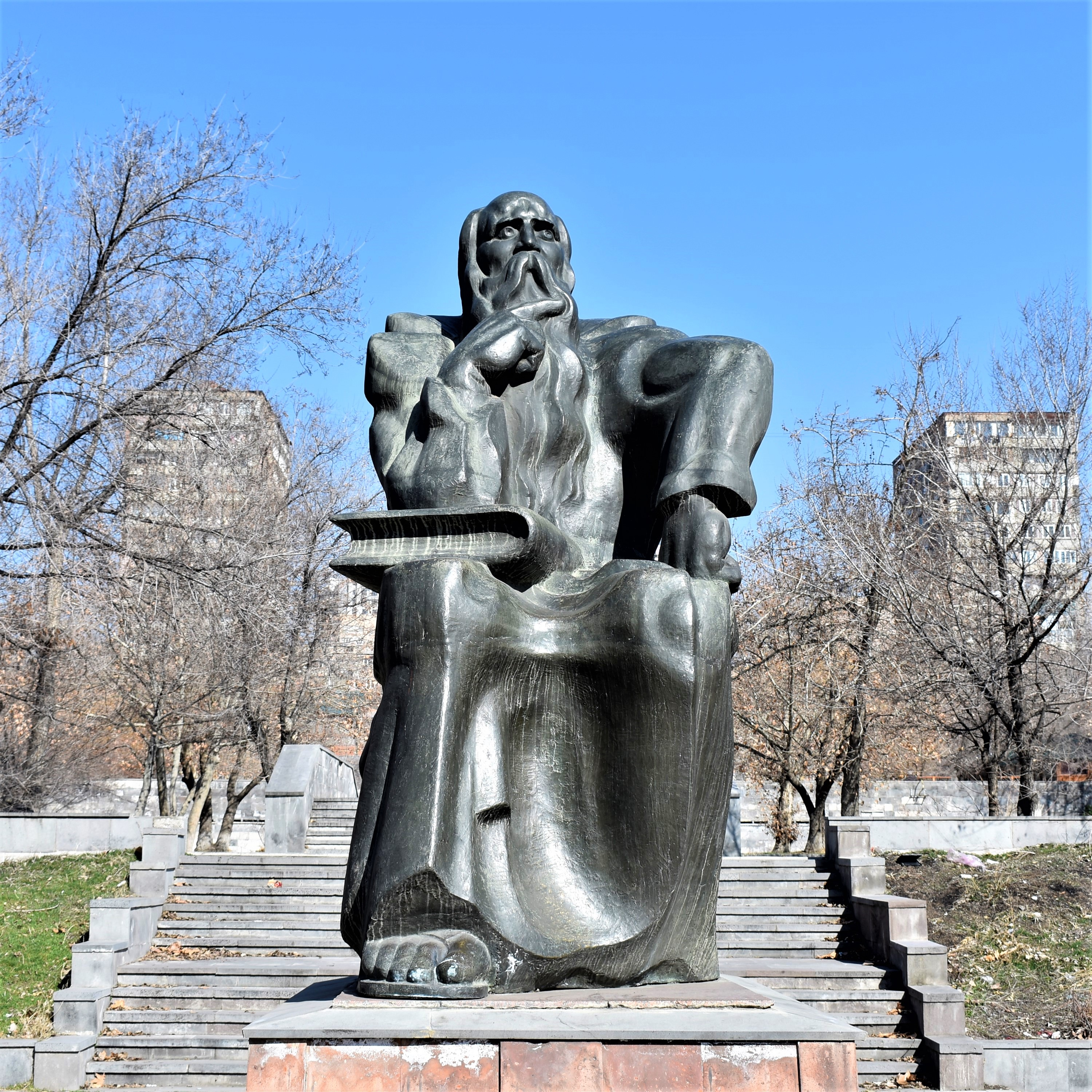
The 1985 statue of David the Invincible in Yerevan

David the Invincible or David the Philosopher was a Neoplatonic philosopher of the 6th century.

== Biography ==
David was a pupil of Olympiodorus in Alexandria. His works, originally written in Greek, survive in medieval Armenian translation, and he was given the byname of "invincible" (Old Armenian: Անյաղթ, romanized: Anyałt’) (Note: Reformed orthography: Անհաղթ, Anhaght’; this also reflects the modern Armenian pronunciation.) in the Armenian tradition, which considers David himself an Armenian. Historian Tara Andrews states that his ethnicity is uncertain.

Due to confusion with other authors called David and due to an abundant body of medieval legend, almost nothing is known with certainty about the historical David. Armenian tradition makes him a native of Taron, but this is not substantiated in contemporary sources and may be due to conflation with another person. He was active in Alexandria in Byzantine Egypt, known as an expert in Aristotle's Physics. He supposedly received the byname "invincible" for his exceptional oratory and argumentative skills. David is said to have returned to his native Armenia later in life, where he was active as a teacher, but he came into conflict with the Armenian church and ultimately died in exile in Haghbat.

Of the number of works attributed to him, many are pseudepigraphic or doubtful. The works which can be attributed to him with certainty or at least with some plausibility are not scholarly treatises but propaedeutic (introductory) handbooks for use in teaching beginners. They were composed in Greek but survive only in Armenian translation. Philologically, these translations are important representatives of the "Hellenizing" tradition (Yunaban dprots’) in Armenian literature of the 6th to 8th centuries.

The David Anhaght Medal, the highest-ranking medal granted by the Armenian Academy of Philosophy, is named after him. In 1978, a film about David the Invincible by Armenian director Levon Mkrtchyan was released by Armenfilm.

== Bibliography ==
- Andrews, Tara L. (2013). "Identity, Philosophy, and the Problem of Armenian History in the Sixth Century". In Wood, Philip (ed.). History and Identity in the Late Antique Near East. Oxford University Press. pp. 27–42. ISBN 978-0-19-991540-8.
- Calzolari, Valentina (23 November 2009). "David et la tradition arménienne". In Calzolari, Valentina; Barnes, Jonathan R. (eds.). L'œuvre de David l'Invincible et la transmission de la pensée grecque dans la tradition arménienne et syriaque. Commentaria in Aristotelem Armeniaca - Davidis Opera. Vol. 1. Leiden: Brill. pp. 15–36. doi:10.1163/ej.9789004160477.i-238.9. ISBN 978-90-04-16047-7. OCLC 318867138.
- Gertz, Sebastian (2017). Elias and David: Introductions to Philosophy with Olympiodorus: Introduction to Logic. Bloomsbury Academic. ISBN 9781350136441.
- Topchyan, Aram (2010). David the Invincible, Commentary on Aristotle's Prior Analytics. Brill. ISBN 9789004187191.
- Muradyan, Gohar, ed. (27 November 2014). Commentary on Porphyry's Isagoge: Old Armenian text with the Greek original, an English translation, introduction and notes. Leiden: Brill. doi:10.1163/9789004280885. ISBN 978-90-04-28088-5.
- Sanjian, Avedis K., ed. (1986). David Anhaghtʿ, the 'Invincible' Philosopher. Atlanta, Georgia: Scholars' Press. ISBN 1555400671.
- Calzolari, Valentina; Barnes, Jonathan R., eds. (23 November 2009). L'œuvre de David l'Invincible et la transmission de la pensée grecque dans la tradition arménienne et syriaque. Commentaria in Aristotelem Armeniaca - Davidis Opera (in French and English). Vol. 1. Leiden: Brill. doi:10.1163/ej.9789004160477.i-238. ISBN 978-90-04-16047-7. OCLC 318867138.
- Benedetta, Contin (2011). La version arménienne des œuvres grecques de David l'Invincible. Recherches sur la formation du vocabulaire épistémologique arménien (PDF) (Thesis). University of Geneva. (in French)
