= Armenians in Austria =

Armenian diaspora in Austria

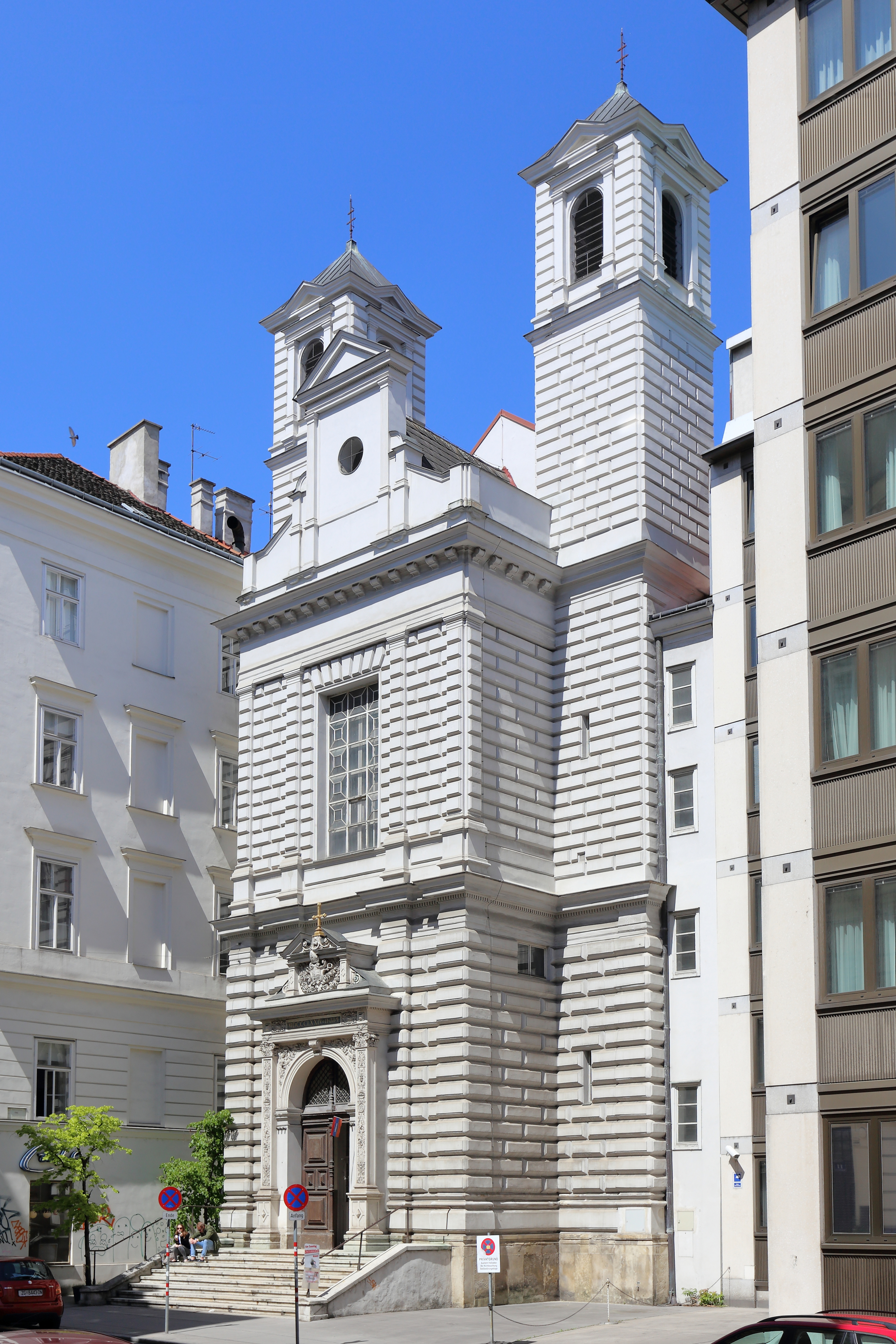
- Mechitaristenkirche: the Mechitarist Armenian Catholic Church in Vienna, Austria

Total population
- 6,000

Regions with significant populations
- Vienna

Languages
- Armenian, German

Religion
- Armenian Apostolic Church, Armenian Catholic Church

Related ethnic groups
- Armenians in Germany, Armenians in Hungary, Armenians in Switzerland

Armenians in Austria (Armenian: Հայերն Ավստրիայում, romanized: Hayern Avstriayum; German: Armenier in Österreich) refers to ethnic Armenians living in Austria. They number around 6,000 and mainly live in Vienna. There is also the very important presence of the Mekhitarist Order in Vienna that plays a major role in the country as well as worldwide.

== History ==
=== Early history ===
The history of Armenians in Austria dates back to the time of Vienna's liberation from the Turkish siege at the end of the 17th century, when several Armenian merchants found a new market in the Habsburg empire.

In fact, the city's characteristic coffee culture was established and run for a long time in its early decades by Armenian merchants. The very first documented coffee house in Vienna was opened on 17 January 1685, by Johannes Deodat (or Diodato, known in Armenian as Owanes Astouatzatur – Յովհաննէս Աստուածատուր – some sources claiming him to be Greek).

=== After the 1770s Austrian annexations of Galicia and Bukovina ===
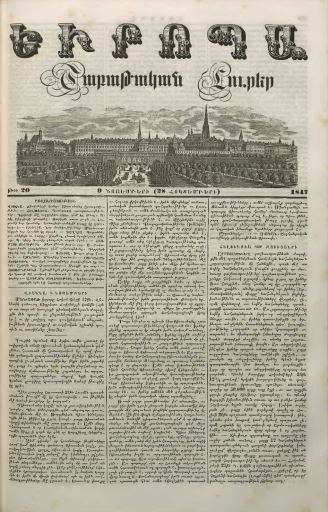
Evropa (Europe), a literary and scholarly journal, 1847

In 1772–1774, the Austrian Empire annexed Galicia (see Austrian Partition, as part of the late-18th century Partitions of Poland) and especially the formerly Moldavian Voivodeship of Bukovina (see Treaty of Küçük Kaynarca; today a part of Ukraine), which at the time held the largest area contiguously settled by Armenians in Europe, and the Bukovian and Galician Armenians automatically became subjects to the Empire. In 1775, Maria Theresa gave official permission to the Mechitarist Congregation of the Armenian Catholic Church to settle in the Habsburg Empire. The Mekhitarian congregation in Vienna contributed to the spread of Armenian culture in central Europe through its printing, its library and its college for Armenian boys.

By the end of the 18th century, the Austrian authorities dissolved Armenian church schools for children in the annexed areas of Poland and the Armenian Collegium in Lwów, with only one Armenian school active until the 1860s in Kuty. By the end of the 19th century, proficiency in Armenian among the Armenians of the Austrian Partition of Poland had almost completely disappeared.

At the beginning of the 19th century, the Austrian Armenians enjoyed officially recognized status as an autonomous religious community. The Armenian community in Vienna grew constantly, so that already in 1896 the first efforts were made to found an Armenian-Apostolic community. In 1912, a small chapel was established in Vienna.

=== World War I and its aftermath ===
World War I and its aftermath transformed the Austrian Armenian community: The area of the Bukovina Armenians was lost during the war, but a wave of immigrants came to Austria as a result of the Armenian genocide perpetrated by the Ottoman Turks in 1915. Austria as an ally of the Ottoman Empire was hostile towards attempts of Armenian Catholic Archbishop of Lwów Józef Teodorowicz to bring several thousand Armenian survivors of the genocide to Lwów. After 1918, Galicia became part of a re-established Poland again, while the Bukovina region and much of its Armenian population became part of Romania (and in 1945 was turned over to the USSR and today Ukraine, which prompted most of its Armenian population to leave to Poland and Czechoslovakia after 1945).

After the appointment of the first Armenian pastor in Vienna in the 1920s, the number of Armenians in Austria continued to grow, also boosted by refugees from Lebanon, Syria, Iraq, Iran, as well as migrant Armenian workers from Turkey and more recently from Armenia.

=== After 1945 ===
In 1968, the Saint Hripsime Church of Vienna was consecrated, giving a new impetus to the ever growing Armenian community in Austria. There is also a Saturday Armenian School named Hovhannes Shiraz.

Both countries established diplomatic relations in 1996. Armenia has an embassy in Vienna and Austria is represented in Armenia through its embassy in Moscow (Russia).

== Mechitarist Order in Vienna (1810–present) ==
Although the monastic headquarters of the Mekhitarist Order founded by Mekhitar da Pietro(1676–1749), an Armenian Catholic monk is on the island of St. Lazarus in Venice (San Lazzaro Monastero Armeno in Italian), the Mechitarists have kept an important presence in Vienna since 1810.

Even much before, actually in 1775, Maria Theresa had already given the official permission to the Mechitarists congregation of the Armenian Catholic Church to settle in the Habsburg Empire and they had established in Trieste.

By 1810, they established a new monastic center in Vienna using a Franciscan church. When in 1835, the church the Order was using burnt down completely, the Mechitarists hired the services of one of the most famous architects of Vienna of the time Josef Kornhäusel for constructing a new church.

Due to financial issues, the construction of the designed church failed to materialize for a few decades. When the church was finally built, a new architect called Fritz Sitte had already altered the designs considerably. He, and later his son Camillo Sitte finished building the church in 1874.

Vienna Congregation is not just a religious center, but a veritable cultural center for Armenians as well. The monks especially cultivated the Armenian language, Armenian history and Armenian literature and published all of the old Armenian writers' works with commentaries under the title of "National Library". Aydinian of Vienna wrote the fundamental textbook of modern Armenian grammar in 1866; Tschamtschian (1738–1823) published a 3-volume history in Venice (which then belonged to Austria), and in Vienna Garagaschian (1818–1903) wrote a 4-volume history of Armenia.

The Vienna branch has been publishing Handes Amsorya, a scholarly publication on Armenian linguistics and philology, since 1887.

The library of the Mechitarist Congregation, founded in 1773, owns a special collection of Armenian and Oriental manuscripts (approx. 153,000 vols., 2,000 manuscripts, numismatic collection). The Library has recently announced the formation of the digital list of the Library's books and manuscripts available online.

An association was formed for the propagation of good books worldwide to all Armenian communities, and a high-quality printing press that published average of six new works each year.

A herb liquor called "Mechitharine" and produced by the monks is said to contain 43 herbs and 12 fruits – the precise ingredients and recipe remains is a secret and known by only two monks at a time. The Mechitharine is still produced today and sold commercially by the monks.

== See also ==
- Category:Austrian people of Armenian descent
- Armenia–Austria relations
- Armenian diaspora
- Johannes Diodato (Johannes Deodat, Johannes Theodat, Owanes Astouatzatur) (1640, Istanbul–1725, Vienna)
- Mechitarists
- Armenians in France
- Armenians in Germany
- Armenians in the Czech Republic
- Armenians in Poland
- Armenians in Slovakia
- Armenians in Hungary
- Armenians in Romania
- Armenians in Moldova
- Armenians in Ukraine
- Armenians in Serbia
- Armenians in Croatia (Armenia–Croatia relations)
- Armenians in Finland (Armenia–Finland relations)
- Armenians in Albania
- Armenians in North Macedonia
- Armenians in Bulgaria
- Armenians in Greece
- Armenians in Turkey
- Armenians in Italy
- Armenians in Spain
- Armenians in the Netherlands

== Bibliography ==
- Osiecki, Jakub (2020). "Towarzystwo Polsko-Ormiańskie we Lwowie (1920–1922)". Lehahayer. Czasopismo poświęcone dziejom Ormian polskich (in Polish). No. 7.
