= Armenians in Italy =

Total population
- 2,500

Regions with significant populations
- Lombardy; Lazio; Veneto

Languages
- Armenian; Italian

Religion
- Mainly Armenian Apostolic Church: Armenian Catholic Church; Armenian Evangelical Church

Related ethnic groups
- other Armenians; Hamshenis; Cherkesogai

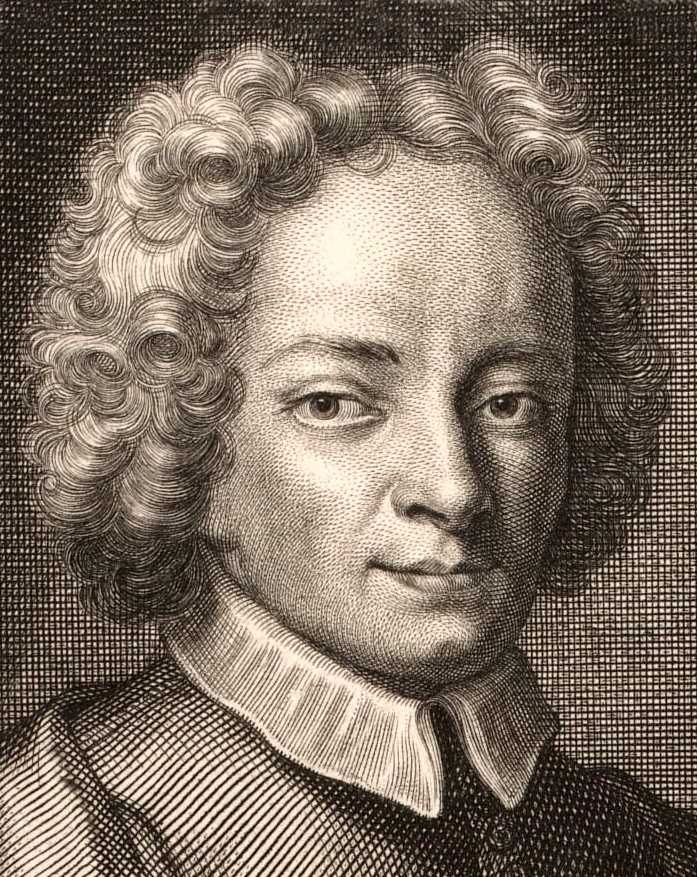
Gjuro Baglivi

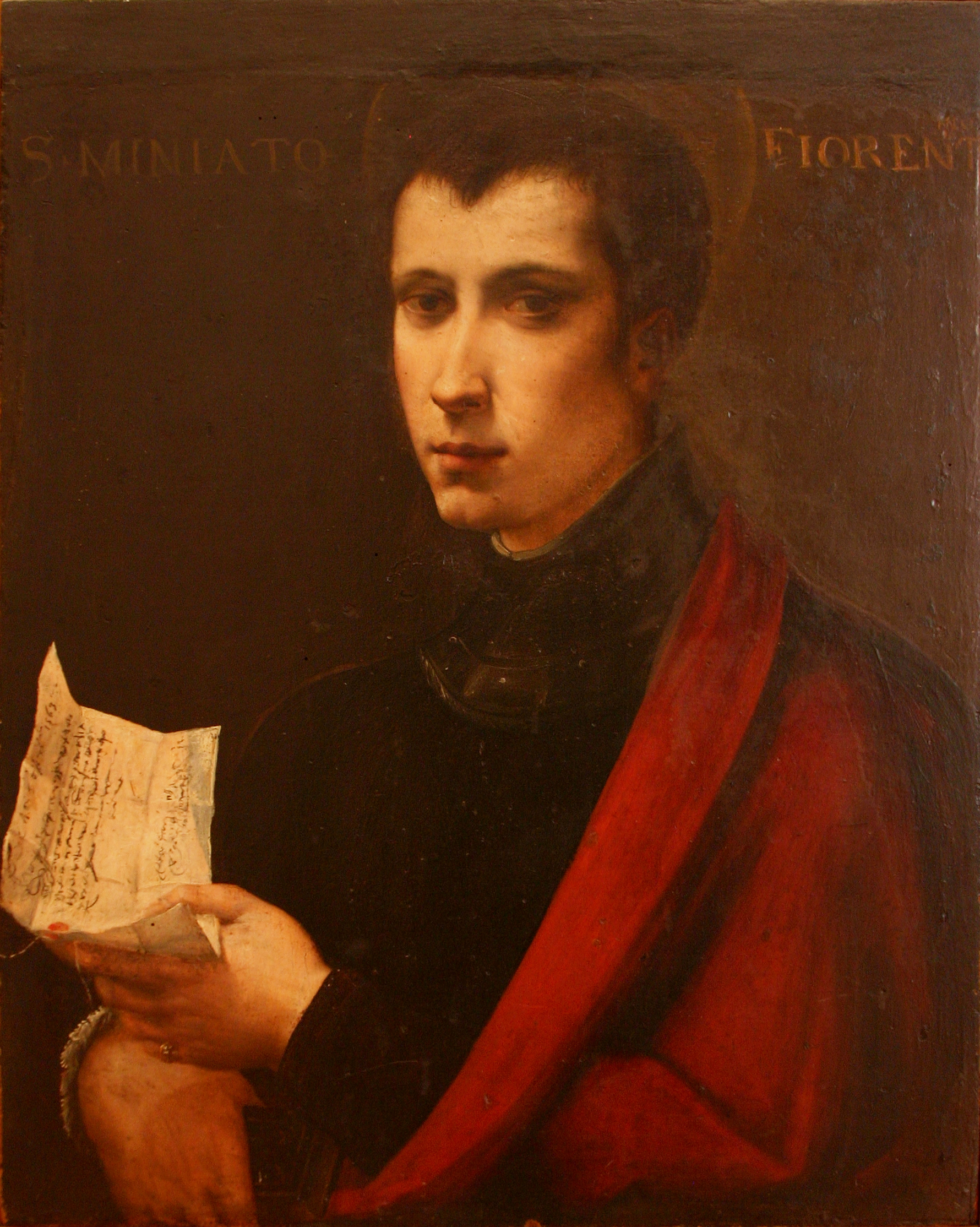
Minias of Florence

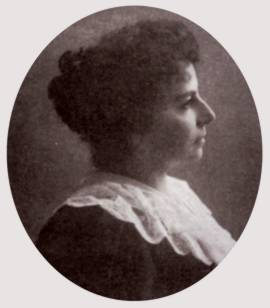
Vittoria Aganoor

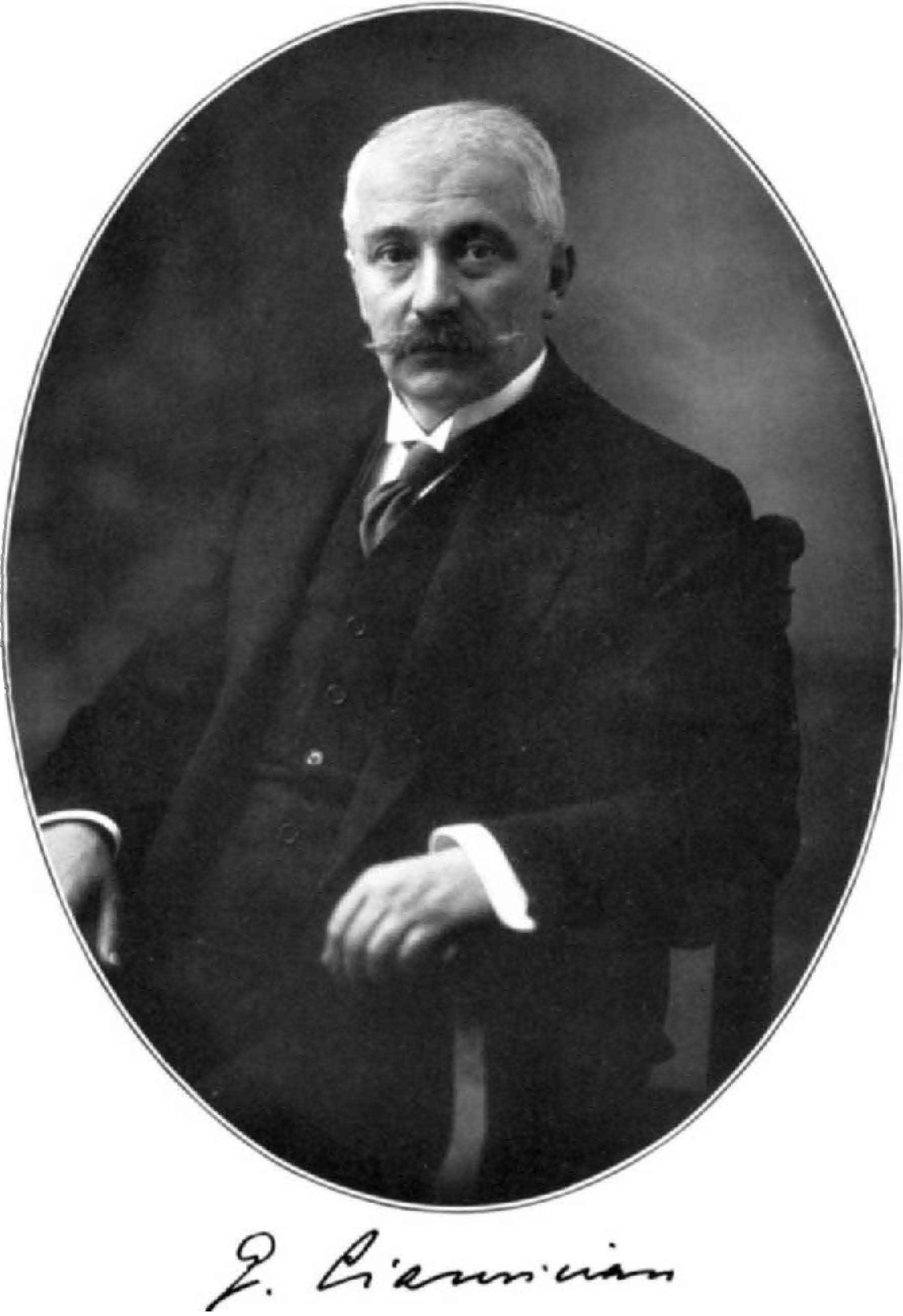
Giacomo Luigi Ciamician

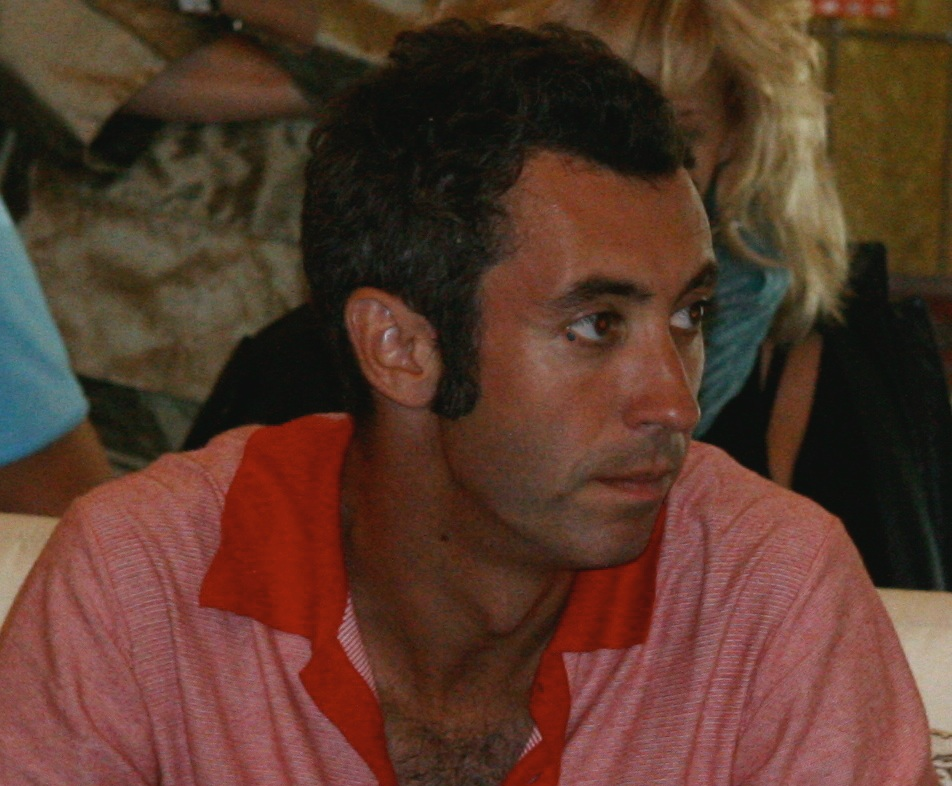
Paolo Kessisoglu

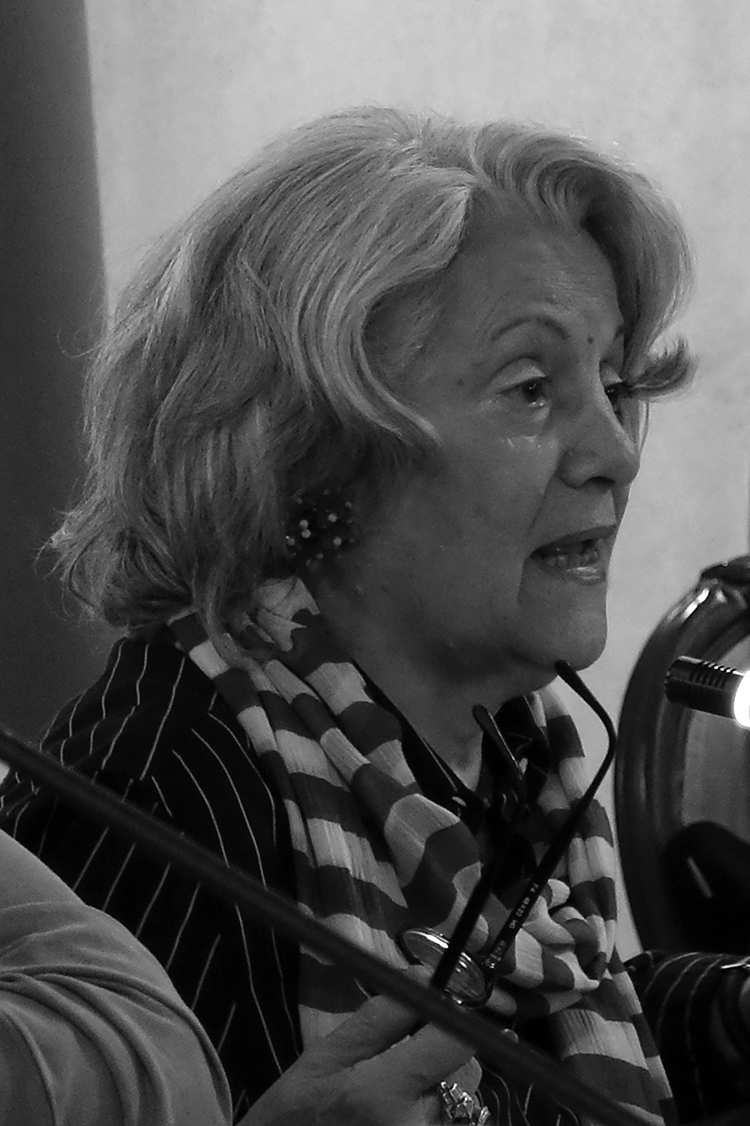
Antonia Arslan

Armenians in Italy (Armenian: Հայերն Իտալիայում; Italian: Armeni in Italia) covers the Armenians who live in Italy. There are currently 2,500-3,500 Armenians in Italy mainly residing in Milan, Rome and Venice; another main centre of Armenian culture and history is Padua.

Besides the general population, there are monastic communities on the island of San Lazzaro degli Armeni (Venice) as well as Armenian clergy at the Holy See (Vatican).

== History ==
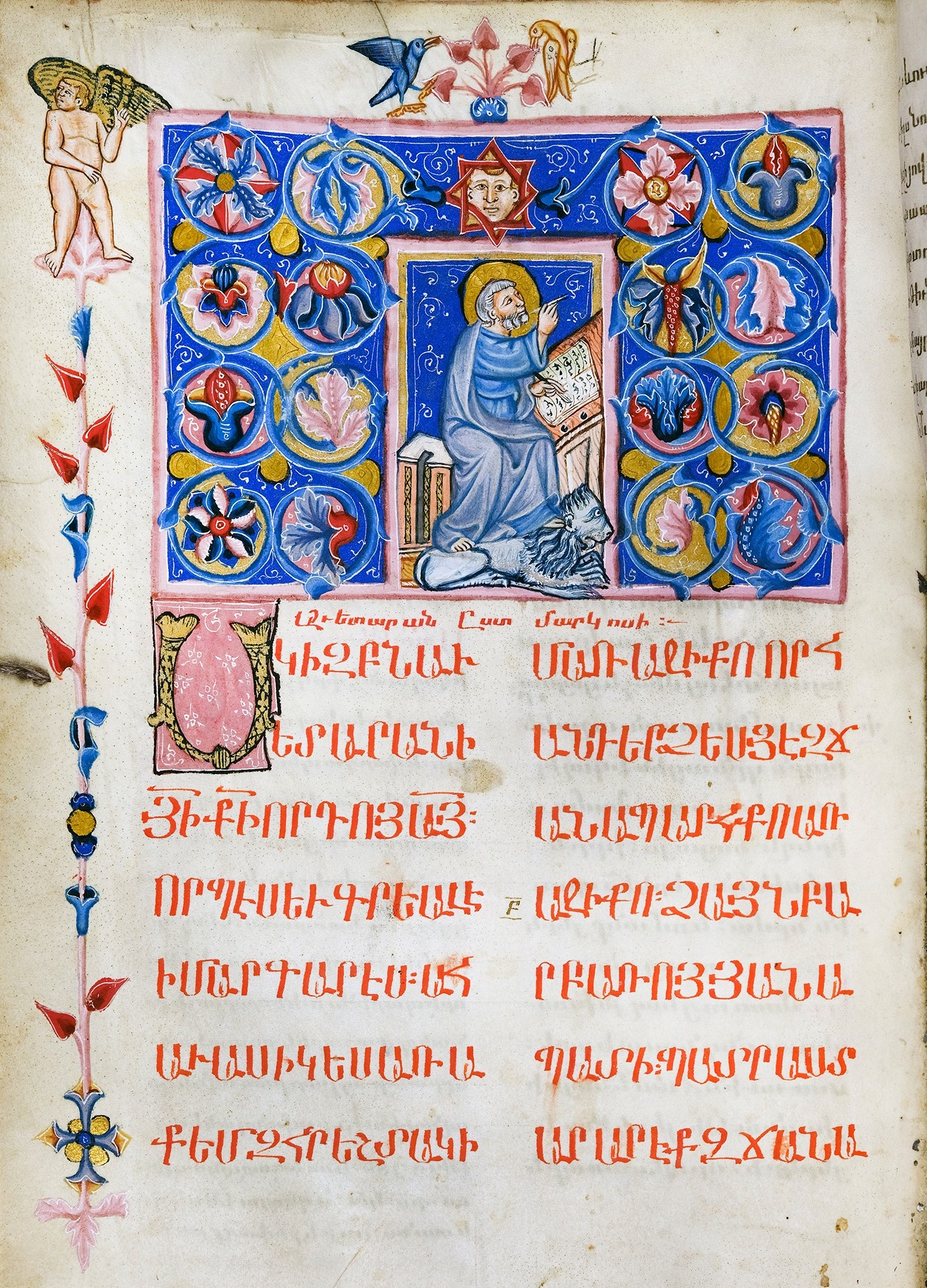
Armenian manuscript copied in Perugia in 1331

Armenians in Italy have had a presence since ancient Roman times. Teacher and rhetorician Prohaeresius was sent by the Emperor to Rome, where he became an object of popular veneration, culminating in the erection of his statue, which bore the inscription Regina rerum Roma, Regi Eloquentiae i.e. "(from) Rome, the queen of cities, to the king of eloquence". Justinian's Armenian general Narses successfully attacked resistance to Roman rule wherever it was located and remained a celebrated governor of Venice.

Later, in the 9th-10th centuries, a great number of Armenians moved to Italy from Thrace and Macedonia. They were the descendants of Paulicians chased from Armenia by emperor Constantin. An Armenian Byzantine princess, Maria Argyra, became Dogaressa of Venice in 1003.

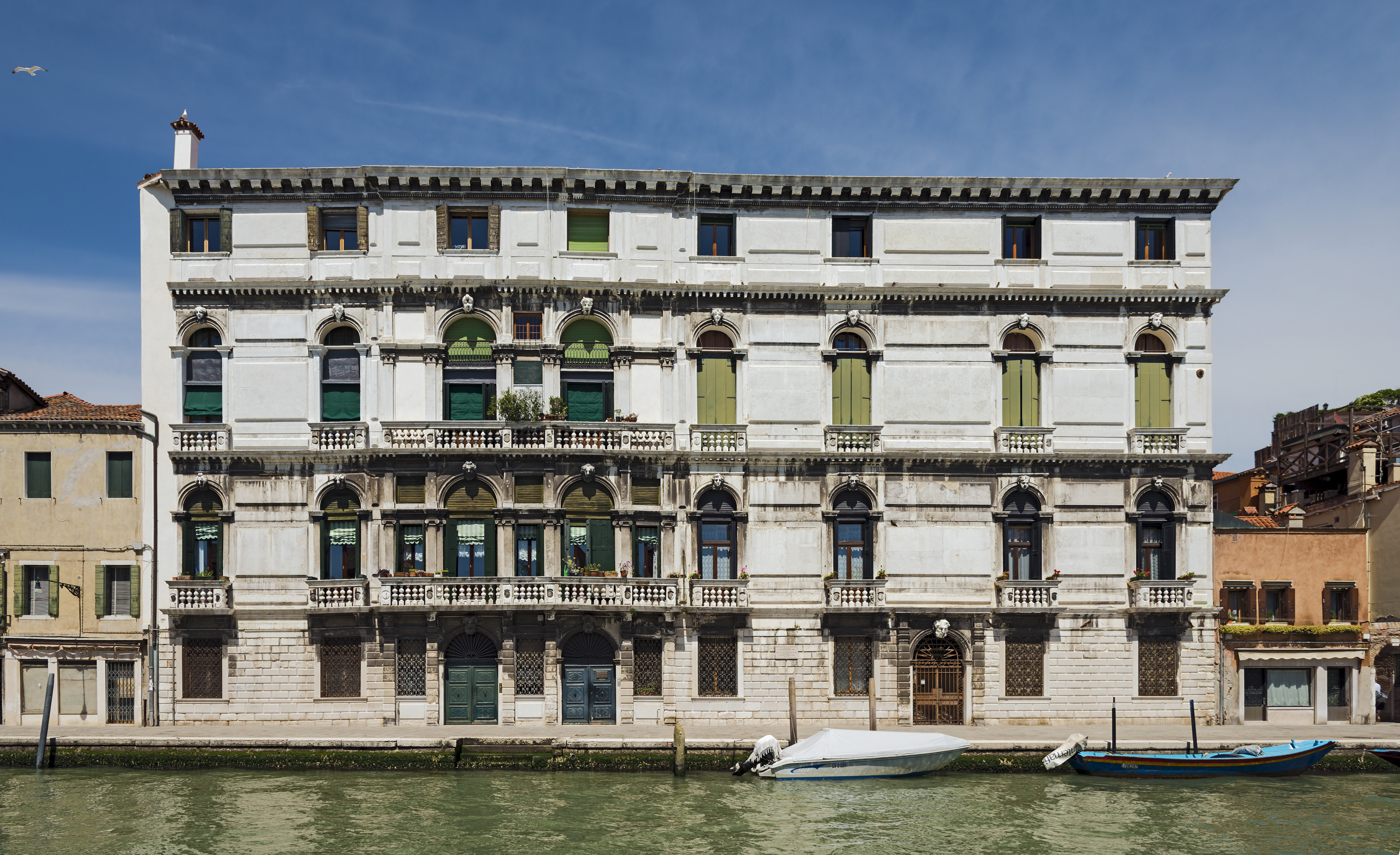
Palazzo Surian Bellotto in Venice

As to Armenian communities, they were formed in Italy in the 12th-13th centuries, when active trade was going on between Cilician Armenia and Italian big city-republics as Genoa, Venice and Pisa. Under Cilician Armenian king Levon II (1187–1219) (also known as King Leo II of Armenia), treaties were signed between the two parties, according to which Italian merchants had the right to open factories and to develop industrial activities in the Armenian Kingdom of Cilicia and Armenian merchants could do the same in Italian towns. These treaties were periodically renewed, as long as the Cilician Armenian Kingdom existed. In the 13th century the number of Armenians in Italy increased because of the new wave of emigrants after the invasion of Tatars and Mongols. Leonardo da Vinci made drawings of Armenians living in Italy.

Surians were a Venetian patrician family of Armenian origin and members of the Great Council of Venice. Antonio Surian was the Patriarch of Venice from 1504 to 1508. Michel Surian was instrumental in assisting Pope Pius V with creating the Holy League, which gathered its fleets to defeat the Turkish armada in the Battle of Lepanto in 1571. Another Antonio Surian, who was widely known as "The Armenian", was the Serene Republic's ambassador to England. The Palazzo Surian Bellotto was built on the Cannaregio Canal by Surians in the 17th century. They were also famous for reorganising Venetian Arsenal.

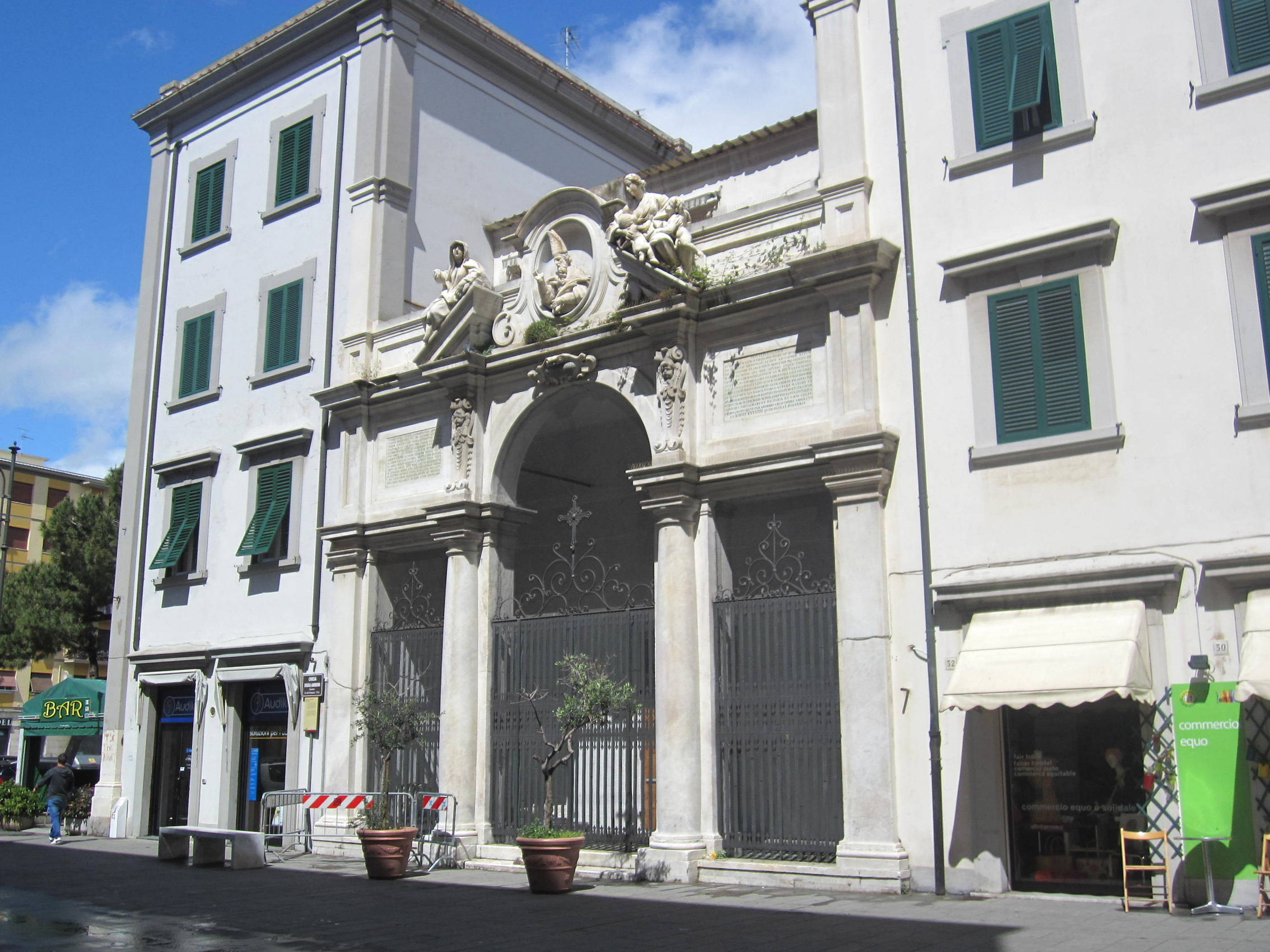
The Armenian Church of Livorno

The Seriman family from Isfahan had gained importance in Venice during the 17th century and owned the Palazzo Contarini-Sceriman.

Art historians like Josef Strzygowski write about Armenian impact on Italian architecture. For example, he writes: "Brunelleschi may be said to have completed the Gothic cathedral of Florence in the Armenian style. Looking at the East end from without, one might take it for the work of an Armenian architect".

Beginning with the 15th-16th centuries the process of catholicizing Armenians was strengthened in Italy which greatly contributed to their assimilation with Italian people. Nevertheless, some Armenian organizations continued to function with the aim to preserve national identity. According to Italian historical sources, it was more common to hear the Armenian language on the cosmopolitan lanes and canals of the Veneto than to hear English or German. As a result, the first Armenian books were printed in Venice.

Besides, in the beginning of the 18th century the Armenian Congregation of the Mechitarists (Armenian: Մխիթարեան, also spelled Mekhitarists), was founded in Venice, on the St. Lazzaro Island (San Lazzaro degli Armeni). It exists up till now with its monastery, library, manuscripts depository and publishing house, and is considered a centre of Armenian culture in Italy.

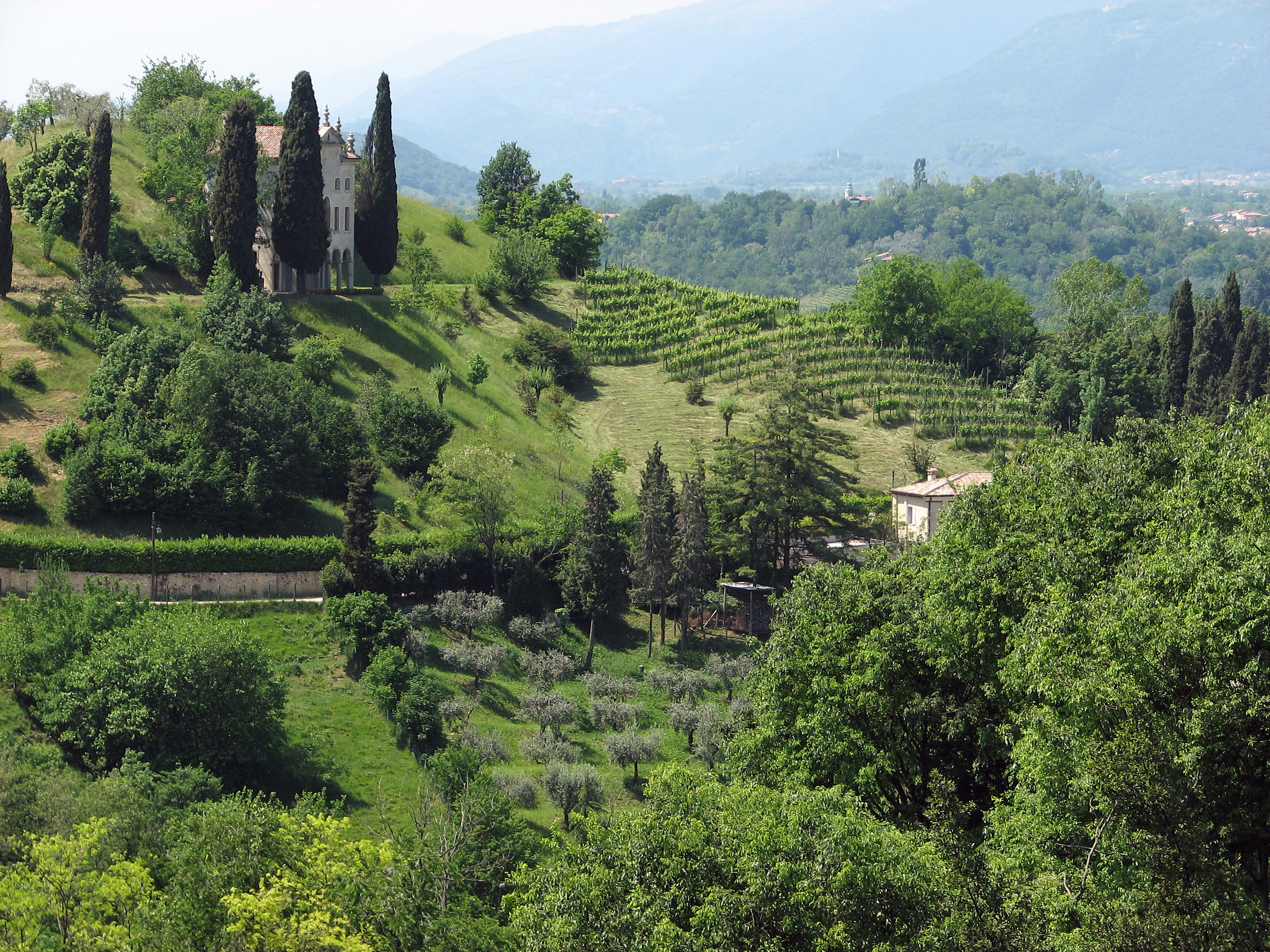
Villa degli Armeni in Treviso

There was also the reputable Moorat-Raphael College in Venice for general education with student body from Armenians from many countries, which was founded in 1836 and functioned until 1997, and the Collegio Armeno (The Pontifical Armenian College) in Rome for preparation of clergy in the Armenian Catholic Church.

In 1895 the whole complex of Villa Contarini degli Armeni in Asolo became the ownership of the Mechitarists of Venice.

Two streets in Venice are bearing Armenian names, Ruga Giuffa (Julfa Street), and Sotoportego dei Armeni. In Livorno, also there are streets with Armenian names.

The Church of St Bartholomew of The Armenians built in 1308 in Genoa, Italy is known for the Holy Face of Genoa kept in the church.

Russian-Armenian prince Semyon Abamelek-Lazarev was an italophile who owned the Villa Abamelek in Rome.

In the early 20th century, there was a "small Italian Armenian community" organised by Mihran Damadian primarily made up of "merchants and traders in Milan"—industrialist Garbis Dilsizia was appointed honorary vice-consul of Armenia. Italy was also home to the Mekhitarists based in Venice which "led the way in propagating Armenian history and culture in France and Italy." In February 1920, Mikayel Varandian who was "well known among socialist circles in Italy" was appointed the Armenian diplomatic representative to Italy.

In 1924 a village for Armenian exiles, Nor Arax, was founded in the countryside of Bari. Carlo Coppola, secretary of the Armenian Association of Puglia in Bari, founder and director of the Hrant Nazaryants Cultural Center, has published a book entitled "Armenians in Sicily" in 2020.

In 1937 there were about 250 Armenians in Milan which was the center of Armenian community (with the officially registered Union of Italian-Armenians as its main organization).

In 1968 a Department of Armenian Studies was opened at the Polytechnic University of Milan. In June 1976 the Centre for the Study and Conservation of Armenian Culture (CSDCA) was established by Prof. Adriano Alpago Novello in Milan. Since 1986 the Padus-Araxes Cultural Association organizes annual summer intensive courses of Armenian language and culture at Ca' Foscari University of Venice.

On February 4, 2023 the Mayor of the city of Florence, Dario Nardella, has handed over the keys to the city to the Argentine Armenian businessman Eduardo Eurnekian. “His Argentine and Armenian descent and the fact that he created the Raoul Wallenberg Foundation (…) is a very important symbol for us,” the Mayor said.

=== San Lazzaro Island ===
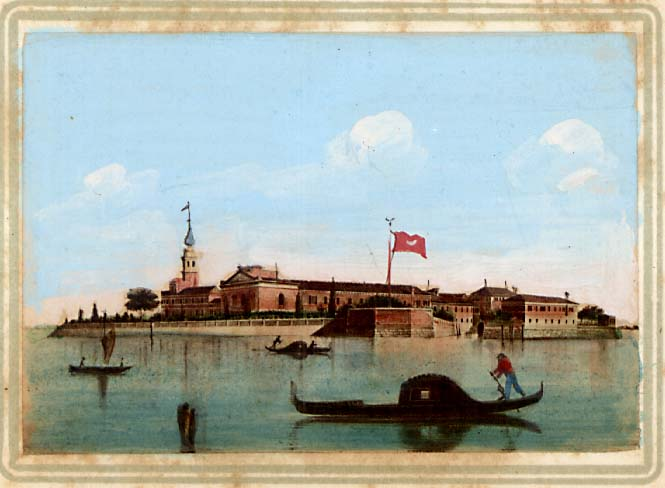
19th century postcard of San Lazzaro degli Armeni

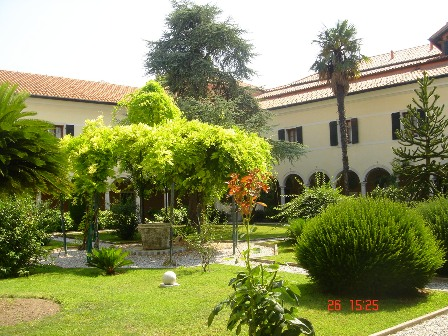
The cloister of the monastery on the island of San Lazzaro (Saint Lazarus) near Venice, Italy, headquarters of the Mechitarists

The Monastic headquarters of the Mekhitarist Order is on the island of St. Lazarus in Venice (San Lazzaro Monastero Armeno in Italian). It is located on San Lazzaro degli Armeni, (Armenian: "Սուրբ Ղազարոս Կղզի", English: Saint Lazarus Island), a small island in the Venetian Lagoon, lying immediately west of the Lido; completely occupied by an Armenian Catholic monastery that is the mother-house of the Mekhitarist Order. It is considered one of the world's foremost centers of Armenian culture.

The beginnings of the island's Armenian history started when Mekhitar da Pietro and his seventeen monks built a monastery, restored the old church, and enlarged the island to its present 30,000 square metres, about four times its original area.

Its founder's temperament and natural gifts for scholarly pursuits immediately set the Mekhitarist Order in the forefront of Oriental studies: the monastery published Armenian historical, philological and literary works and related material, renowned for their scholarship and accuracy as well as for the beauty of the editions, on its own multilingual presses.

The island also houses a 150,000-volume library, as well as a museum with over 4,000 Armenian manuscripts and many Arab, Indian and Egyptian artifacts collected by the monks or received as gifts.

The Mekhitarist Order also publishes the longest-running Armenian periodical, the academic "Pazmaveb".

=== Collegio Armeno in Rome ===
Gregory XIII in 1584 had decreed the erection of a college for the Armenians (Bull "Romana Ecclesia"), but the plan fell through. When the Collegio Urbano of the Propaganda was founded later, there were always some places for Armenian students to study.

Finally, in 1885, thanks to the generosity of some wealthy Armenians and of Leo XIII, the Collegio Armeno (The Pontifical Armenian College) was granted the Church of S. Nicola da Tolentino in the street of that name and the original wishes and decree of Gregory XIII realized after so many years.

The president of Collegio Armeno is an Armenian prelate; the students numbering from 20 to 25 study and attend lectures at the Collegio Urbano of the Propaganda, and wear red sashes and large-sleeved Oriental cloaks.

=== Moorat-Raphael College in Venice ===
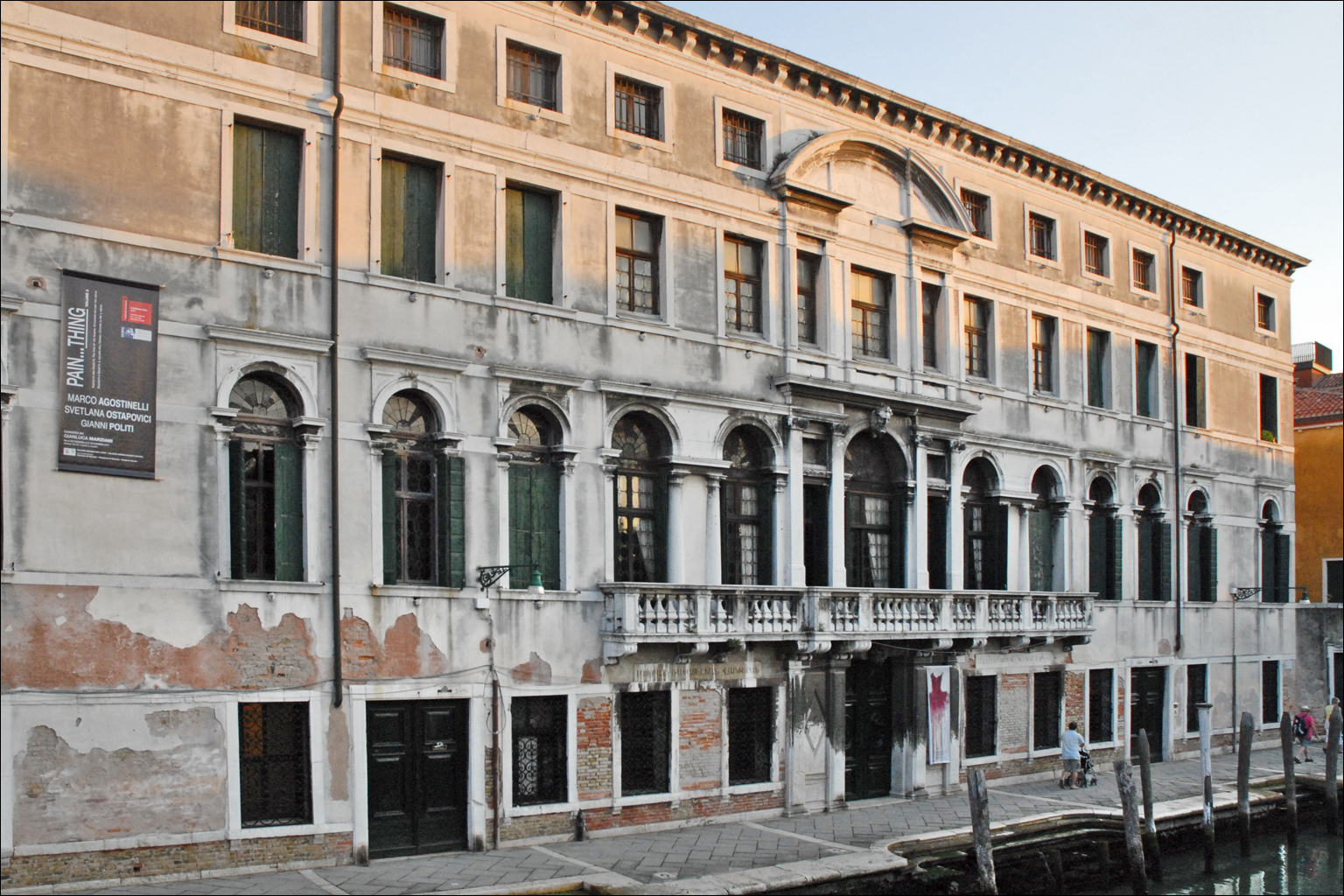
Moorat-Raphael College

Two wealthy Armenians from India, namely Mkertich Murat and Edward Raphael made donations to establish an Armenian college in Venice that was named Moorat-Raphael College in honour of the donors.

The property housing the college was the Palazzo Zenobio, built in a Baroque style in 1690, and a subtle example of Venetian art and life in the 17th century, as testified to by the beautiful Sala degli Specchi and Sala degli Stucchi. The college also maintained a high academic level of education, a reputable teaching staff, both clergy and laity, and the college had beautiful gardens. Moorat-Raphael College closed in 1997, but has since served as a motel, while also hosting occasional art exhibitions, summer schools and workshops to preserve the special artistic atmosphere of the college.

=== Cardinal Agagianian and the Vatican ===
The Armenian Cardinal Gregorio Pietro Agagianian (Krikor Bedros Aghajanian Armenian: Գրիգոր Պետրոս Աղաճանեան) (September 18, 1895 –May 16, 1971) was a leading prelate of the Armenian Catholic Church. He served as Patriarch Catholicos of Cilicia for Armenian Catholics from 1937 to 1962, and Prefect of the Congregation for the Propagation of the Faith (Congregation for the Evangelization of Peoples) in the Roman Curia from 1958 to 1970. Agagianian was elevated to the cardinalate in 1946 by Pope Pius XII.

Cardinal Agagianian was born in Akhaltsikhe (in modern Georgia), he studied at the seminary in Tbilisi and the Pontifical Urbaniana University in Rome. He was ordained as a priest on December 23, 1917. He entered the teaching Faculty of the Pontifical Armenian College in Rome in 1921; he became later the Rector of the same college from 1932 to 1937. Appointed Titular Bishop of Comana on July 11, 1935, he was elected Patriarch Catholicos of Cilicia of All Armenians by the Armenian Catholic Synod, on November 30, 1937, with the name of Gregory Peter XV. On February 18, 1946, he was elevated to the College of Cardinals by Pope Pius XII.

During the 1958 papal conclave, following the death of Pius XII, Agagianian received a large number of votes, eventually approaching the majority needed for election. This was confirmed by the elected pope himself, Pope John XXIII. The newly elected pope John XXIII appointed Cardinal Agagianian to be a member of the leading body of the Second Vatican Council together with Cardinals Leo Joseph Suenens, Julius Döpfner and Giacomo Lercaro. Aghajanian was Pro-Prefect of the Sacred Congregation for the Propagation of the Faith from 1958 and full Prefect from July 18, 1960, to October 19, 1970. He died in Rome on May 16, 1971.

== Famous Italians of Armenian Origin ==
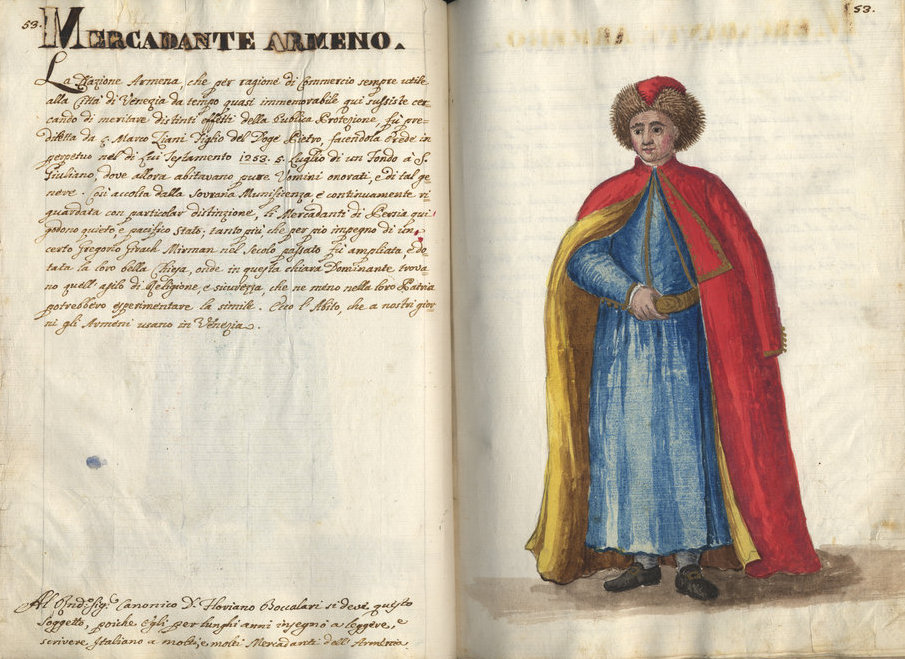
Portriet of Armenian merchant in Venice from 18th century

According to Gostan Zarian, the Armenians built 34 churches and monasteries in Italy, and eleven saints of Italy had Armenian origin. Armenian prince Saint Minias (3rd century) is venerated as the first Christian martyr of Florence. The church of San Miniato al Monte is dedicated to him.

Cristoforo Armeno was the author of The Three Princes of Serendip, published in 1557.

Among the most famous Armenian names in Italy in earlier centuries was Gjuro Baglivi (Giorgio Baglivi), whom the Enciclopedia Italiana (known as Treccani) holds to be "one of the most eminent men in the history of medicine". Baglivi was the name of a doctor of Lecce who adopted him as an orphan of a Julfa family. Other famous Italians of Armenian origin are the Venetian engineer Anton Surian, the Venetian abbot and author Zaccaria Seriman, the poet Vittoria Aganoor and the chemist Giacomo Luigi Ciamician. Domenico Serpos was a ballet dancer, librettist and choreographer of the early 19th century.

In spite of their small numbers, the Armenians in Italy have achieved notable successes in the country's cultural life. For example, the book and film critic Glauco Viazzi (Jusik Achrafian, 1921–1981), the art critic Eduardo Arslan (Yetwart, 1899–1968), the poet and writer Gostan Zarian, the musician Angelo Ephrikian (1913–1982), the Arslan family of ear, nose, and throat specialists in Padua and Genoa, and Alessandro Megighian (1928–1981), former president of the European Academy of Gnathology are often mentioned. The first three were commemorated in a praiseworthy initiative from 1982 to 1984 in Venice, under the general title "Armenians in Italian culture."

Poet and writer Kostan Zarian studied Armenian on the island of San Lazzaro degli Armeni in Venice (1910–1912), where he also published Three Songs (1915), a book of poems in Italian (originally written in Armenian), one of which was set to music by Ottorino Respighi. Later Zarian lived in Rome and Florence. The whole family of Zarian was connected to Italy, including Kostan's wife pianist Taguhi, their daughter sculptor Nvard (both lived and died in Rome), their son Armen, who constructed several buildings in Rome, and Armen's son Ara, an architect who resides in Italy. Armen Zarian played a huge role in the development of Armenian-Italian relations.

Armenian poet Avetik Isahakyan lived in Italy in the 1920s. Italian-Armenian poet and playwright Tovmas Terzian is the author of Arshak II opera libretto. Giorgio Nurigiani was a writer, linguist, and literary critic. Hrand Nazariantz was a poet and translator whose candidacy was proposed for the Nobel Prize in Literature in 1953. Gregorio Sciltian was a painter. Léon Gurekian was an architect, writer and political activist. His son Ohannés Gurekian was an architect, engineer, and alpinist. A prominent living writer and academic is Antonia Arslan from Padua. Laura Ephrikian is an actress.

Among the well known Italians with Armenian ancestry are the showman Paolo Kessisoglu (1969), whose grandfather, born Keshishian, moved from Anatolia to Genoa at the beginning of 20th century fearing aggressions in Turkey (though having already changed his surname to a more Turkish version); Gevorg Petrosyan, a kickboxer and Muay Thai fighter living in Italy and fighting out of the Satori Gladiatorium in Gorizia; Writer Arthur Alexanian was awarded by the XI European authors competition's first prize for his Il bambino e i venti d'Armenia book.

== Community ==
In 2000, the issue of recognition of the Armenian genocide was floored as a bill in the Italian Parliament that went on to recognize the Armenian genocide. A memorial dedicated to the victims of the Armenian genocide was inaugurated in 2006 in the center of Rome.

== Religion ==
Besides the San Lazzaro degli Armeni, Italy has a number of very important churches and religious establishments.

- Santa Croce degli Armeni (Holy Cross Armenian Church on Calle Degli Armeni) (1434, Venice)
- San Biagio degli Armeni (Surp Vlas Armenian Catholic Church) (Rome)
- San Nicola de Tolentino Armenian Catholic Church (Rome)
- Armenian Apostolic Church of the Forty Martyrs (Milano)
- San Bartolomeo degli Armeni (Genoa)
- Chiesa degli Armeni o di San Gregorio Illuminatore (Surp Grigor Lusavorich Armenian church, Via della Madonna, Livorno)
- San Gregorio Armeno, Naples
- Chiesa degli Armeni o di San Gregorio Illuminatore, Ancona
- Chiesa dei mechitaristi armeni, Beata Vergine delle Grazie Trieste (Mekhitarist Church in Via dei Giustinelli, Trieste) built 1859; closed, abandoned

Also operating are the Levonian Monastery and the Armenian Immaculate Conception Order.

== See also ==
- Armenian diaspora
- Armenia–Italy relations
