= Mechitharine =

Alcoholic beverage

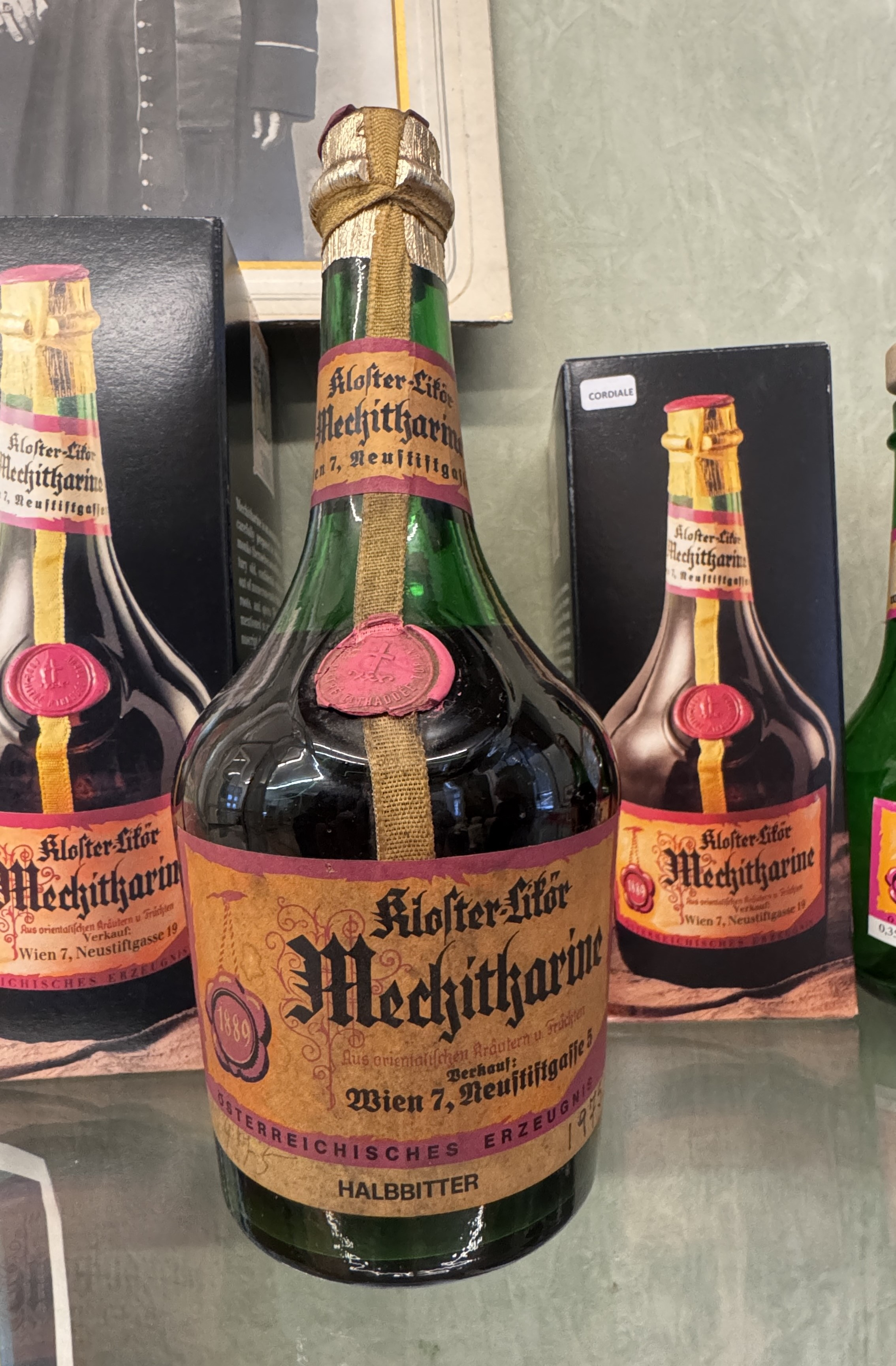
- Type: Liqueur
- Manufacturer: Mechitarist monks
- Origin: Vienna, Austria
- Introduced: 1889
- Alcohol by volume: 30%
- Color: Yellow
- Flavor: herbal, fruity
- Variants: "Edelsüß", "süß", "Halbbitter", Bitter, Edelbitter and Cordiale

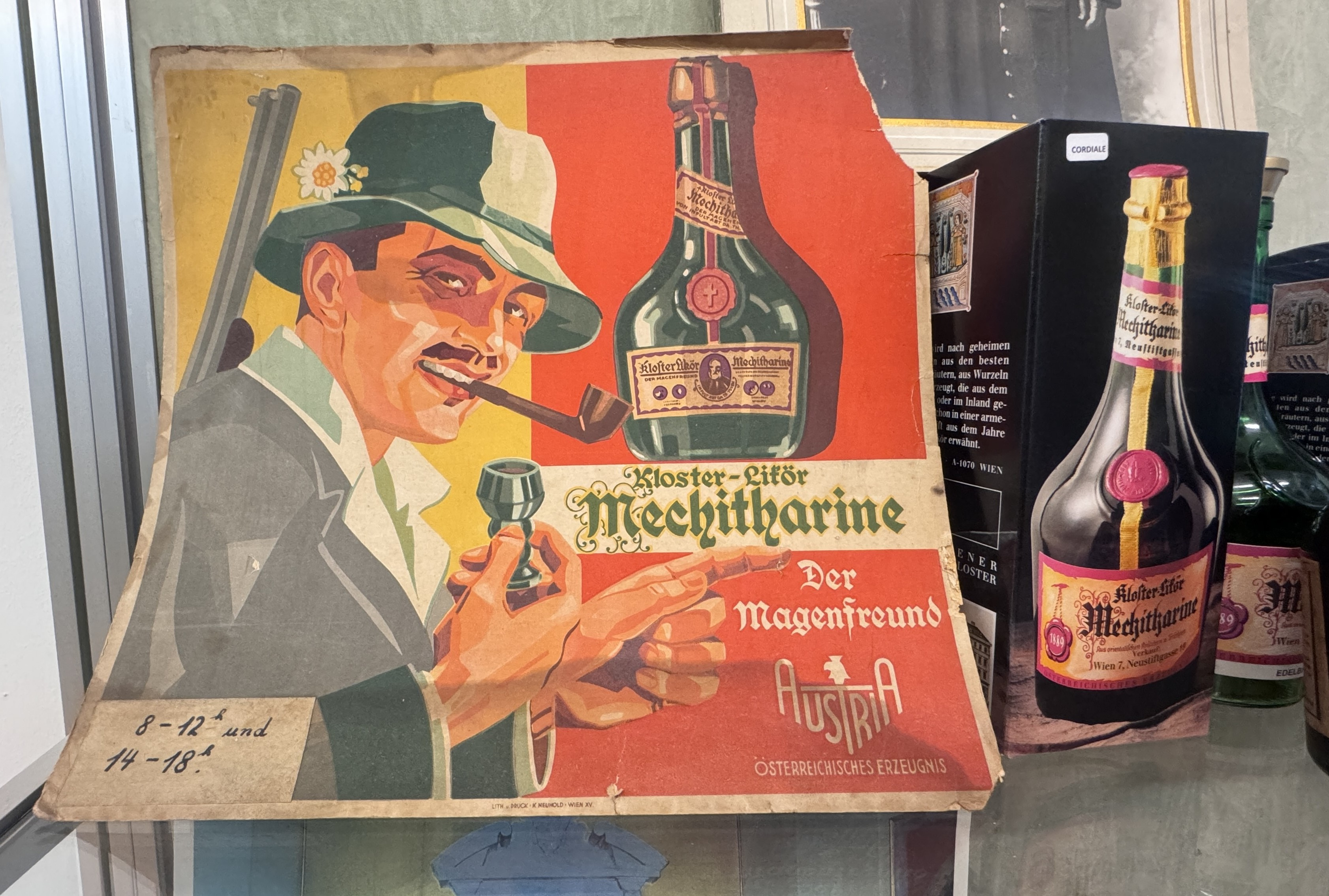
A vintage ad of the liqueur

Mechitharine (Mechitharine Kloster Likör) is an aromatic herb liqueur produced by the Armenian Mechitarist monks in Vienna. The liquor is prepared according to a secret recipe containing herbs roots and fruits – the precise ingredients and recipe remain a secret. Commercial Mechitharine production started in 1889, it is still produced today and sold commercially by the Mechitarist monks.

== History ==
Mechitharine was first mentioned in an Armenian manuscript dating back to 1680. Before mass commercialization, Mechitharine was produced by the monks in Modon, Greece from 1701 to 1715. Liquor production followed the path of the displaced Mechitarists monks; Mechitharine was produced in Venice (1717-1773) then in Trieste (1773-1810) and finally in Vienna since 1811.

According to an article published on January 8, 2018 in the German newspaper Die Zeit, the secret recipes for Mechitharine's six varieties are considered partially lost, following the death of one of the Armenian Fathers responsible for its production. The sole surviving Father with knowledge of the recipes production lives with advanced dementia, making him unable to ordain a younger brother in the art of creating the liqueur. The monastery projects it has enough stock for the next two years, and the current cellar master is working to reconstruct the recipes using purchasing records and chemical analysis.

== Types ==
Mechitharine is available in six flavors with varying degrees of sweetness: "Edelsüß" (precious-sweet), "süß" (sweet), "Halbbitter" (half bitter), Bitter, Edelbitter and Cordiale.

== See also ==
- Armenians in Austria
