= Vittoria Aganoor =

Italian poet

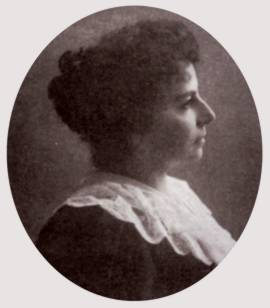
- Born: 26 May 1855; Padua, Austrian Empire
- Died: 9 April 1910 (aged 54)
- Occupation: poet

Vittoria Aganoor (Armenian: Վիկտորիա Աղանուր; 26 May 1855 – 9 April 1910) was an Italian poet with Armenian ancestry. She is considered a "minor but important figure in nineteenth century poetry".

== Biography ==
She was born in Padua, the seventh child of Edoardo Aganoor and Giuseppina Pacini. Her father's family was wealthy Armenian nobility. They had moved to Persia in the eleventh century, settling in Julfa. Later on, acting on the advice of Mechitarist fathers, the family migrated to live in Paris. In France, they founded two notable educational institutions for Armenian nobility: The Collège Raphaël in Paris, followed by the Collegio Moorat in Venice.

Vittoria's parents married in 1847 and moved to Padova. There they took up residence in the 'Casa degli Armeni', or 'House of the Armenians', in Prato della Valle. It was here that Vittoria, along with her four sisters, spent her childhood and adolescence.

Many Italian celebrities, such as Andrea Maffei or Antonio Fogazzaro, visited their home when she was a child. In 1876 she went living to Naples, where she met Enrico Nencioni, who helped her with her poetry, although she wrote letters more often to Domenico Gnoli. She was very emotionally dependent on her family because of her depressive moods and although she was a precocious writer, she did not publish her first book, Leggenda eterna, until 1900. In 1901, she married Guido Pompilj, a well-known member of parliament, and later the Italian Undersecretary of State. Together they went to Perugia. She died from surgery in Rome on 9 April 1910, aged 54.

Her husband, heartbroken by her death, committed suicide shortly thereafter next to her corpse.

== Works ==
- I cavalli di San Marco, Venezia, Stab. Tip. C. Ferrari, 1892;
- A mio padre. Versi, Venezia, Stab. Tip. Lit. C. Ferrari, 1893;
- Leggenda eterna, Milano, Treves, 1900
- Nuove Liriche, Roma, Nuova antologia, 1908;
- Poesie complete, Firenze, F. Le Monnier, 1927;
- Nuove liriche, a cura di John Butcher, Bologna, Nuova S1, 2007;
