= Mkhitar Sebastatsi =

Armenian Catholic monk and theologian (1676–1749)

Servant of God Mekhitar of Sebaste C.M.V.
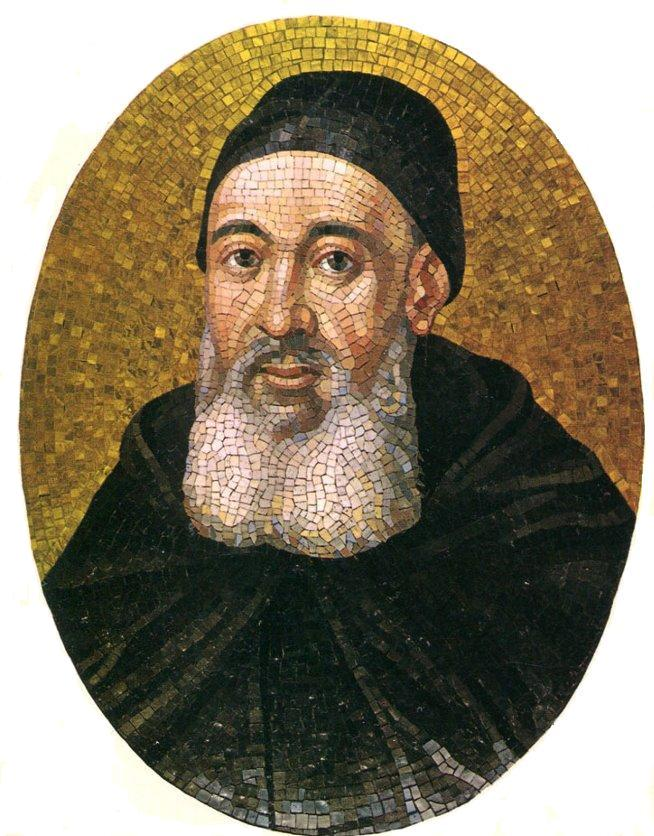
- Born: 17 February 1676; Sebaste, Ottoman Empire
- Died: 27 April 1749 (aged 73); San Lazzaro degli Armeni, Republic of Venice
- Major shrine: Armenian Monastery of San Lazzaro, Venice, Italy

Mkhitar Sebastatsi (Armenian: Մխիթար Սեբաստացի), anglicized: Mekhitar of Sebaste, Italian: Mechitar (17 February 1676 – 27 April 1749) was an Armenian Catholic monk, scholar and theologian who founded the Mekhitarist Order, which has been based on San Lazzaro island near Venice since 1717.

The Armenian historian Stepanos Nazarian described him as the "second Mesrop Mashtots". The cause for his beatification was opened after his death; as such, he is termed a Servant of God.

== Life ==
=== Early life ===
He was born Manug in Sivas Eyalet in the Ottoman Empire on 17 February 1676, the son of a prosperous merchant Bedros [Peter] and his wife Sharistan. His parents gave him a good education to prepare him to assume the family business. Instead, from an early age, he wanted to become a monk. Refused permission for this, he found a young companion to flee to the mountains where they might live as hermits. Quickly found by his parents he was returned home. As a result of this, the bishop who was abbot of the nearby Monastery of Surp Nshan (Holy Cross) conferred minor orders on the boy so that he might assist at the liturgical services of the monastery. Still refused permission to enter the monastery by his parents, he began to frequent a neighboring family which consisted of a mother and her two daughters who lived a monastic form of life in their home, which they shared with an elderly priest, who then taught him about the Divine Office.

At the age of fifteen, Manug finally received the permission he had long sought from his family and he entered the nearby monastery, where he was quickly ordained a deacon. It was at this point that he changed his name to the one he is now known by, Mekhitar (The Consoler).

=== Monk ===
After his admittance to monastic life, Mekhitar began to see that the state of monastic life was extremely low after the devastating destruction of the Armenian monasteries in previous centuries. He began to seek out a source of true learning of the spiritual life, being taken to various monasteries by several traveling religious scholars who promised to teach him what he sought if he would serve them.

During this period, he came into contact with members of Catholic religious orders who were active in Armenia. Learning about Catholicism, he came to feel that Rome would be the best place to do the theological studies he had long sought. Finally, upon reaching Aleppo, he placed himself under the spiritual direction of a Jesuit priest, who gave him a letter of introduction to the Congregation of the Propaganda. He determined to set out for there, but received many setbacks of both health and the rejection of those Armenian monks and bishops along the way who rejected Western doctrines. Finally he was forced to return to his home town, walking barefoot, though he was suffering from jaundice. Slowly regaining his health there, in 1696 he was ordained a priest by the abbot of Holy Cross Monastery.

=== Founder ===
Inspired by the idea of creating a religious order of preachers dedicated to raising the educational and spiritual level of the Armenian people, based on the models of the Western Church, Mekhitar founded in 1701 in Constantinople what would become known after his death as the Mekhitarist Order.

Two years later, escaping persecution by the Ottoman authorities, the order moved to Modon in the Peloponnese, then known as the Morea, which was a Venetian possession. In 1715, the order moved to the Island of San Lazzaro degli Armeni at the invitation of the Venetian Republic. Mekhitar built up the monastery on the island and the order which sent out priests to serve Armenian communities in the Middle East.

Mekhitar died at the monastery on 27 April 1749 and is buried in the monastery church.

== Legacy ==
Malachia Ormanian, a conservative Armenian Apostolic scholar and Patriarch of Constantinople, wrote highly of Mkhitar Sebastatsi, calling him an "ecclesiastic of progressive and liberal views." Ormanian wrote:

Mekhitar had to yield to the demands of the Roman Curia in order to be able to devote himself without restraint to his work of intellectual culture; he wisely abstained from being a party to the work of proselytism. Such a line of conduct, which was in keeping with national interests...

== Veneration ==
The cause for Mekhitar's beatification, which would normally have been able to start fifty years after his death was disrupted by the events of the invasion of Italy by the armies of Revolutionary France under Napoleon, in the course of which almost all monasteries were closed. It was begun about 1895 under the Patriarch of Venice, Giuseppe Sarto. In 1914, after his election as Pope Pius X, the cause was formally accepted by Holy See.

== See also ==
- Eastern Catholic Churches

== Bibliography ==
- Congregazione Mechitaristica - Vita del fondatore (1819) In: Compendiose notizie sulla Congregazione de' Monaci Armeni Mechitaristi di Venezia nell'Isola di S. Lazzaro. Tipografia di suddetta Isola. p. 128 (text in Italian and Armenian)
- Hamazaspian, V. E. (1976). "Մխիթար Սեբաստացի (Ծննդյան 300-ամյակի առթիվ) [Мхитар Себастаци (К 300-летию со дня рождения). Mekhitar of Sebastia (on his 300th birth anniversary)]". Patma-Banasirakan Handes (4): 119–127.
- Mechitar (1911) Catholic Encyclopedia, p. 102
- Nurikhan, Minas (1915). The Life and Times of Abbot Mechitar. Rev. John Mc Quillan (translator). St. Lazarus's Island, Venice.
