= Giorgio Nurigiani =

Giorgio Nurigiani (Armenian: Ջորջո Նուրիջանի, Bulgarian: Жорж Нурижан, 1892–1981) was an Italian and Bulgarian writer, publicist and linguist of Armenian origin.

== Biography ==
He was born in Livorno. His grandfather's brother was the Patriarch of Armenian Catholics of Constantinopole. When he was a child, his family emigrated to Bulgaria. In 1911, he graduated from high school in Stara Zagora, after which he returned to Italy and studied law at the University of Rome. Later Nurigiani taught for two years at the Naval Academy in Livorno. After World War I, Nurigiani resided in Sofia (Bulgaria), where he learned about the Internal Macedonian Revolutionary Organization and he started to support its ideals. He wrote a couple of books and studies on Macedonian issue. In Sofia, he was a correspondent for Italian newspapers, a press secretary at the Italian embassy and an adviser to the papal nuncio in Bulgaria, Angelo Roncalli. In addition, he was also the author of Italian grammars in Bulgarian, Italian-Bulgarian and Bulgarian-Italian dictionaries, as well as studies of the Bulgarian language and of the Italian literature, as well as of books about Bulgarian writers and literary critics. In 1954 he moved back to Italy. Between 1962 and 1965 the Bulgarian Patriarch Kiril kept a lively correspondence with Nurigiani associated with the history of the Bulgarian Uniate Movement. In 1966, he radically changed his views on the Macedonian question which until then was in favor of Bulgaria and took pro-Macedonian positions. In 1967 he collaborated with the Macedonian linguist Naum Kitanovski and they published an Italian – Macedonian dictionary. Because of his overall literary activity, in 1980 he was nominated for the Nobel Prize.

== Works ==
- Grammatica bulgara ad uso degli italiani. Con pref. di S. Mladenov, Sofia 1920
- Dieci anni di vita bulgara (1920 – 1930), Sofia 1931, 224 p.
- La Macedonia nel Pensiero Italiano, Rome 1933, 134 p.
- Il paese delle rose Bulgaria, Sofia 1936, 34 p.
- Glorie bulgare, Sofia 1942, 207 с.
- Macedonia Yesterday and Today (1967)
- The Autocephalous Macedonian Orthodox Church and Its Head Dositej (1968)
- The Macedonian Genius Through the Centuries (1972)
