= Mekhitarist Monastery, Vienna =

Mekhitarist Monastery of Vienna
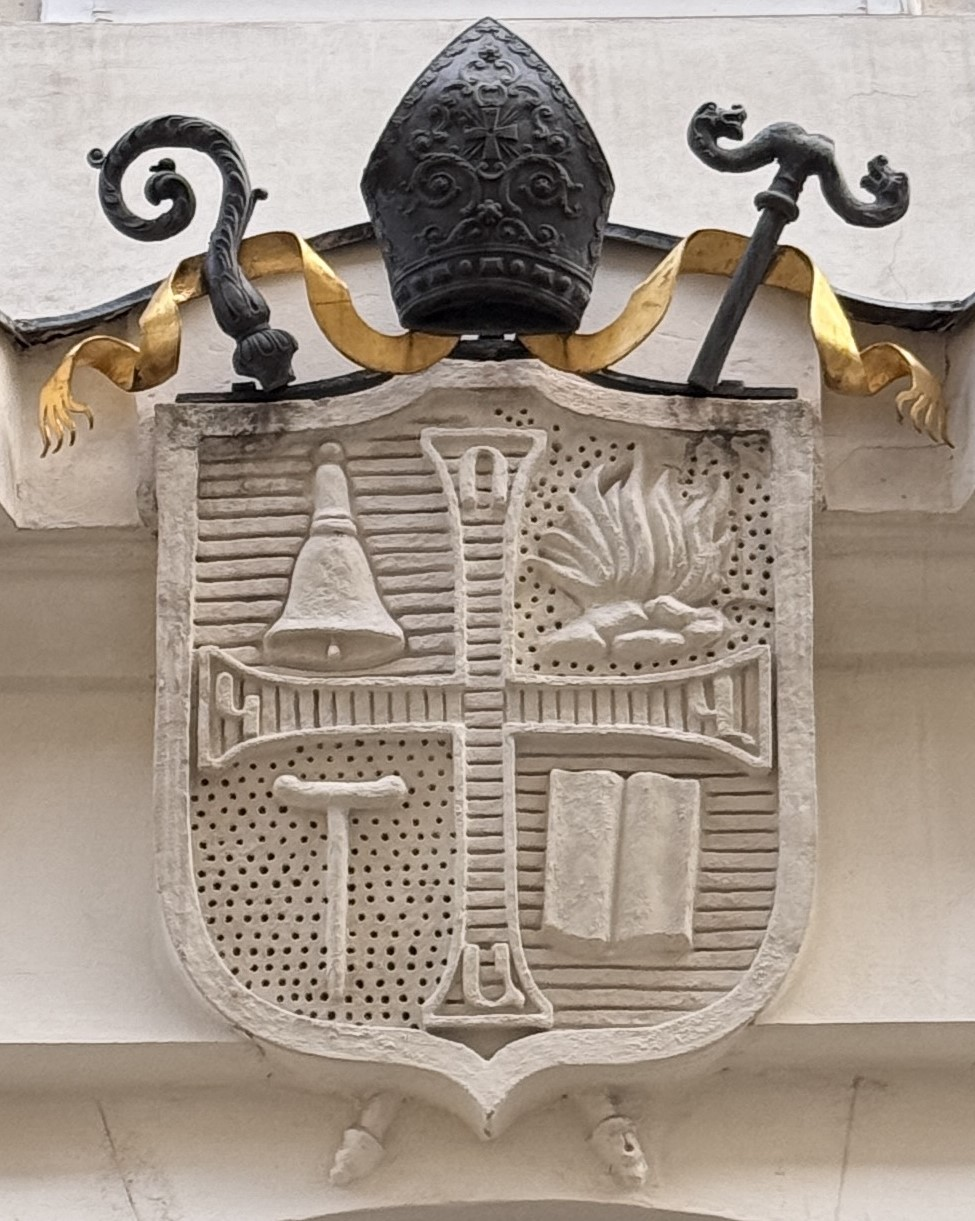
- Mechitaristenkloster

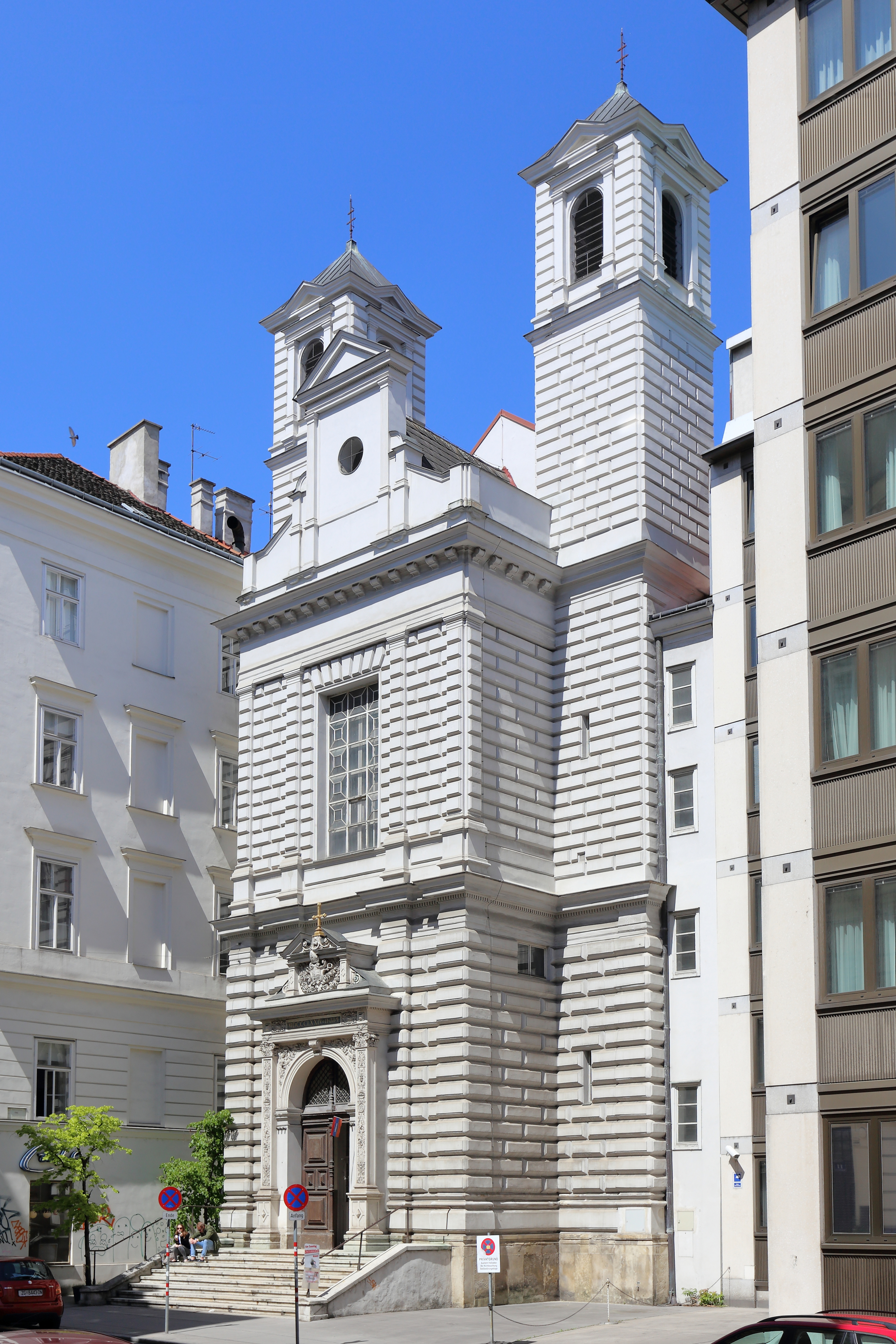
- Main entrance of the monastery

Religion
- Affiliation: Armenian Catholic Church (Mekhitarists)

Location
- Location: Mechitaristengasse 2-4, Neubau, Vienna, Austria
- Interactive map of Mekhitarist Monastery of Vienna
- Coordinates: 48.205653°N 16.354447°E

Architecture
- Architects: Joseph Kornhäusel (monastery); Camillo Sitte (church interior)
- Established: 1811
- Groundbreaking: 1835
- Completed: 1874

Website
- mechitharisten.org

The Mekhitarist Monastery of Vienna (German: Wiener Mechitaristenkloster; Armenian: Վիեննայի Մխիթարեան վանք, Viennayi Mkhit′arean vank′) is one of the two monasteries of the Armenian Catholic Mekhitarist (Mechitharist) Congregation, located in Vienna, Austria. The main center of the order is located in San Lazzaro degli Armeni, Venice, from which the Vienna branch broke off in 1773. The branch initially settled in Trieste, but moved to Vienna in 1805. After centuries of separation, the two branches of Vienna and Venice united in 2000. The Monastery of Vienna was declared their primary abbey. Until the early 20th century it was an important scholarly institution. It now contains a large number of Armenian manuscripts, magazines, coins, and other items.

The Mekhitarists of Vienna produce a herbal liqueur known as Mechitharine—popular in Austria—which they sell at their shop. They have produced it since 1889. It is their main source of income. Other sources of income include renting properties and guided tours.

== History of the congregation ==
The Mekhitarist Congregation of Vienna (Note: Armenian: Վիեննայի Մխիթարեան միաբանութիւն, Viennayi Mkhit′arean miabanut′iun; Latin: Ordo Mechitaristarum Vindobonensis, OMechVd; German: Wiener Mechitaristen Kongregation) originated in 1773 when a group of monks left the island of San Lazzaro (Saint Lazarus), in Venice, and settled in Trieste, which was then under Austrian (Habsburg) rule. Empress Maria Theresa welcomed them in her domains and on May 30, 1775, granted them permission to establish a monastery and church and operate a printing house. After Napoleon's invasion and occupation of Trieste, the Mekhitarists moved to the imperial capital of Vienna in 1805 since they were Habsburg subjects. In 1811 they settled in Am Platzl, an abandoned Capuchin convent just outside the city walls, in the St. Ulrich area. The congregation acquired the property in 1814.

In 1925 Ignaz Seipel, Chancellor of Austria, described the Mekhitarists as "the first pioneers of Austrian culture in the Orient."

According to the Catholic Encyclopedia as of 1912 there were 125 Catholics of the Armenian Rite residing in Vienna out of the total population of 2,004,493. As of 1901 the monastery had 10 Mekhitarist priests, as compared with the 16 priests residing in San Lazzaro, Venice. As of early 2010s the number of fathers residing at the monastery stood at 5–6 or 7.

=== Today ===
It is today one of the lesser known places of worship in Vienna, despite its location in the city center. Around 4,000 people visit the monastery annually, including pensioners, pupils, tourists, particularly those of Armenian ancestry. In recent years, politicians and officials such as Armenian President Serzh Sargsyan, Serbian President Tomislav Nikolić, Austrian MPs, ambassadors of foreign countries stationed in Austria, and Austrian diplomats have visited the monastery. Around 30 to 50 people, both Armenians (including non-Catholics) and non-Armenian Catholics, attend the Sunday Mass.

== Monastery ==
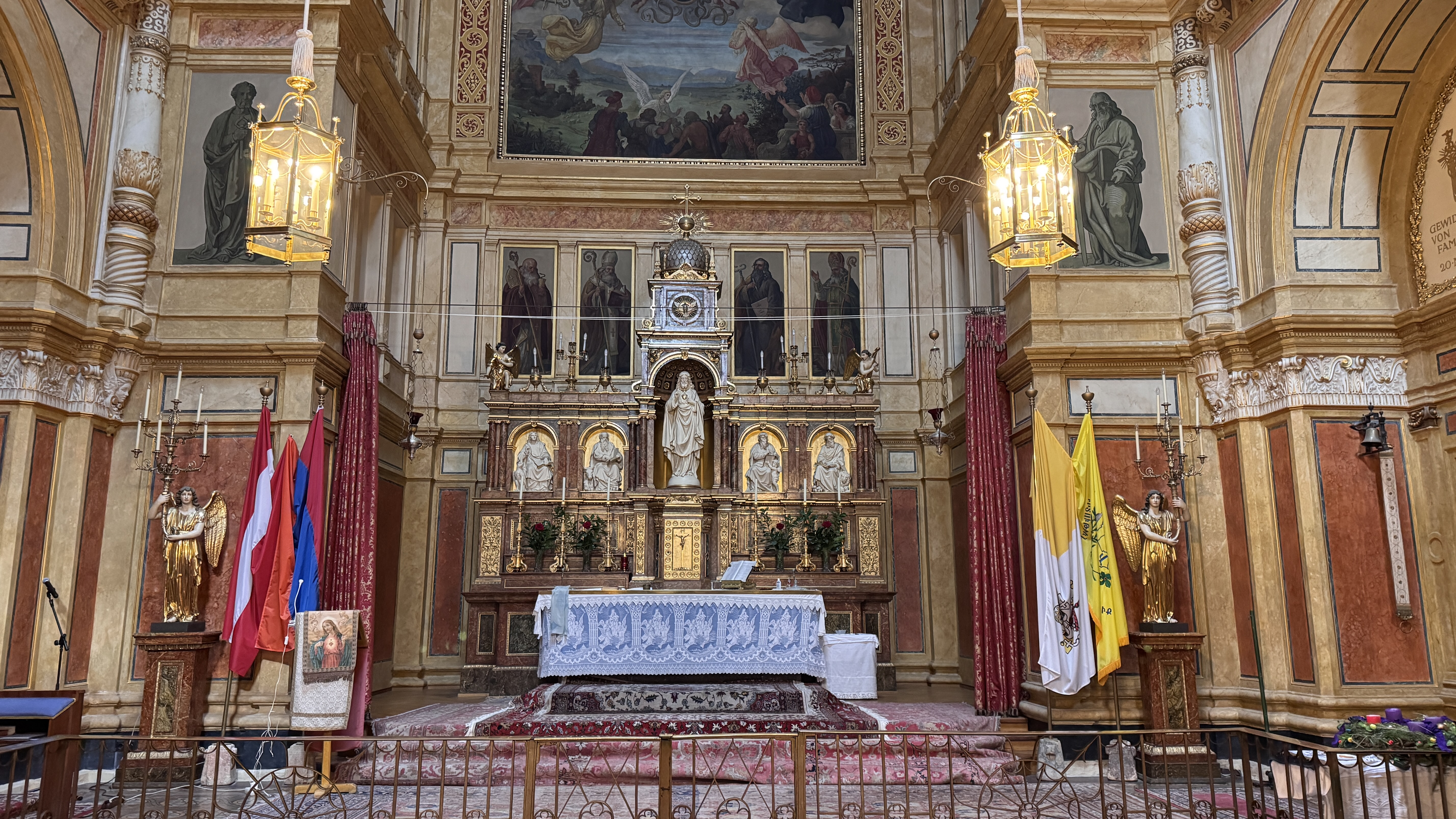
The interior of the church

The current building of the monastery was designed by Joseph Kornhäusel. Sponsored by Emperor Ferdinand I and Empress Maria Anna, it began in 1835 and its cornerstone was laid on October 18, 1837. The building, which stretches along the Mechitaristengasse, has four floors. An 1839 wall painting depicting the feeding the multitude by the German Romantic painter Ludwig Ferdinand Schnorr von Carolsfeld is located in the refectory, which was built according to the design of Kornhäusel.

Two wings and a new church were added to the monastery in 1874, which was the latest major altercation to the complex. The monastery grew significantly from its original size and now occupies almost the entire length of Mechitaristengasse. The interior of the church, named Kirche Maria Schutz, was designed by Camillo Sitte in the Neo-Renaissance style. It was consecrated on August 15, 1874. The altar contains a painting by Sitte titled St Mary’s protection of Armenia by father and son Schnorr von Carolsfeld. The side altar, dedicated to Gregory the Illuminator, was designed by Theophil Hansen, a Danish-born neoclassical architect known for the Austrian Parliament Building. The church was renovated in 1901 and restored in 1958. The church was last renovated in 2011. In 2015 a khachkar dedicated to the victims of the Armenian genocide was inaugurated in the monastery courtyard.

== Collections ==
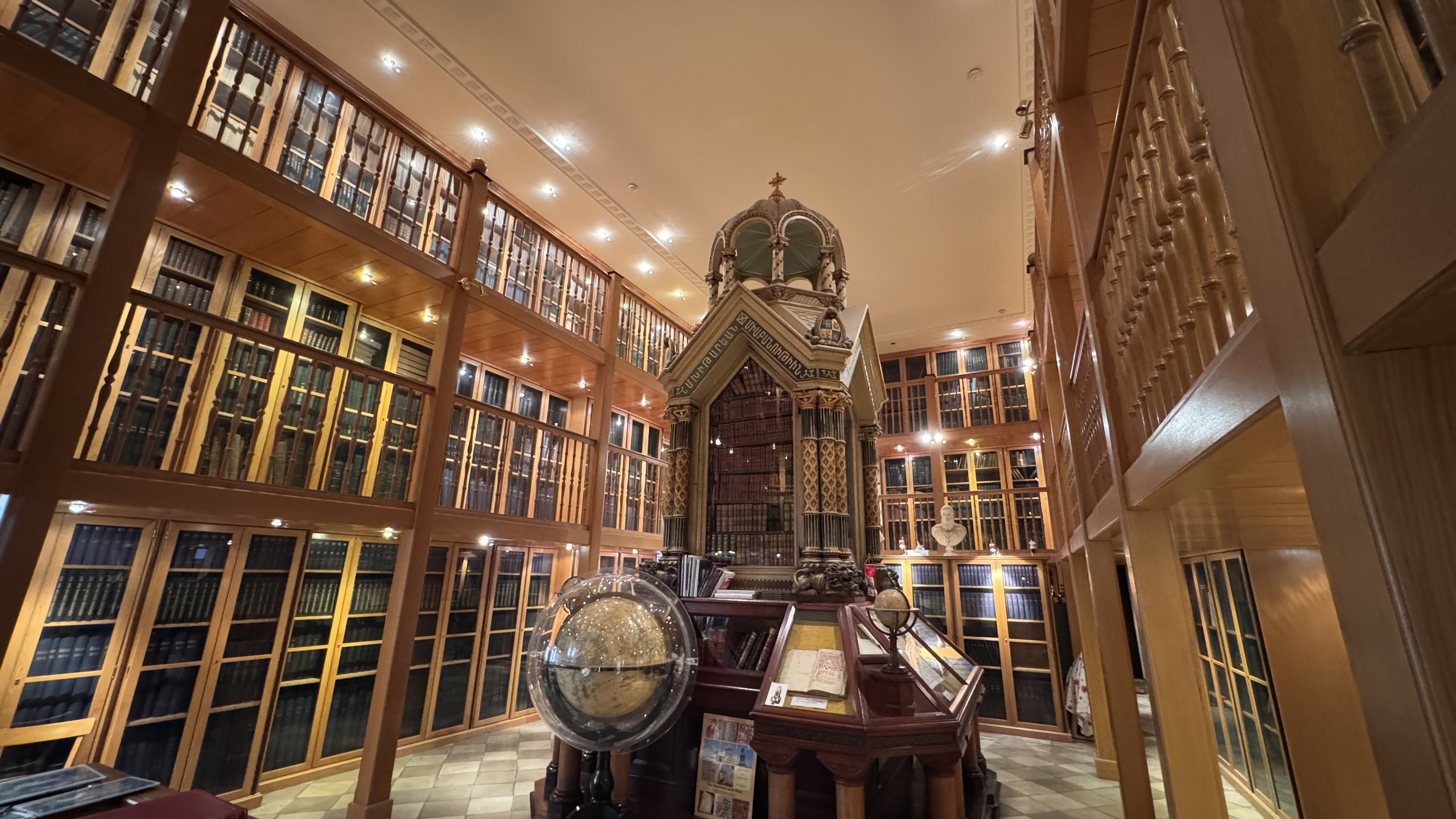
The monastery library

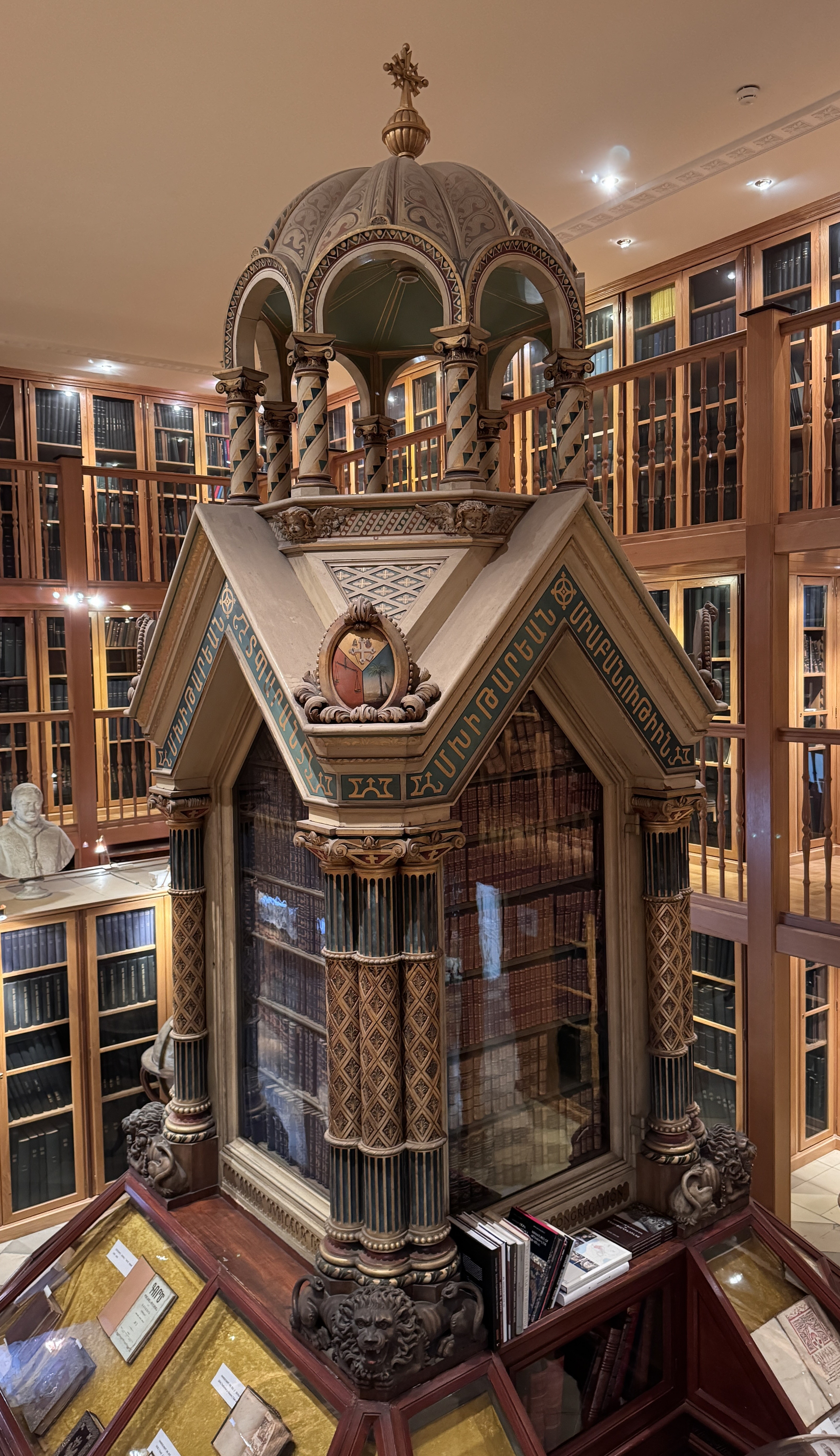
Inside the library

The monastery preserves a significant number of ancient and medieval manuscripts, coins, folk costumes, rugs, books, periodicals, and other items. A 1984 article in Austria Today noted that the Mekhitarists of Vienna are

the guardians of a remarkable and comprehensive library with the world's largest collection of Armenian periodicals and newspapers, a splendid manuscript collection, and a museum with invaluable treasures of Armenian art, everything cataloged restored, and scientifically described. It can be described without exaggeration as the 'Armenian National Library', for all Armenian publications up to the present day are collected there. It is, so to speak, the symbol of a significant intellectual centre outside the mother country.

According to Bernard Coulie the monastery holds around 2,800 Armenian manuscripts, which makes it the 4th largest collection in the world after Matenadaran, the Armenian Patriarchate of Jerusalem, and San Lazzaro degli Armeni. According to Rouben Paul Adalian and the congregation website the number of manuscripts stands at 2,600.

The congregation claims to contain the largest collection of Armenian magazines—at around 70,000 volumes. Gia Aivazian, a literature scholar, noted in 1981 that the Vienna Mekhitarists hold the best collection of retrospective issues of Western Armenian periodicals. The monastery collection has some 120,000 books in Armenian and 15,000 books in other languages on Armenian history, language, and other fields.

Writing in 1973 numismatist Paul Z. Bedoukian noted that the Mekhitarist Monastery of Vienna contains some 3,200 Armenian coins (including hundreds from Armenian Kingdom of Cilicia), the largest collection of Armenian coins in the world. The oldest coins date from the 4th century BC. There are also other Armenian cultural items, such as rugs, ceramics, silverware, paintings by Naghash Hovnatanian and Ivan Aivazovsky.

== Scholarly work and publications ==
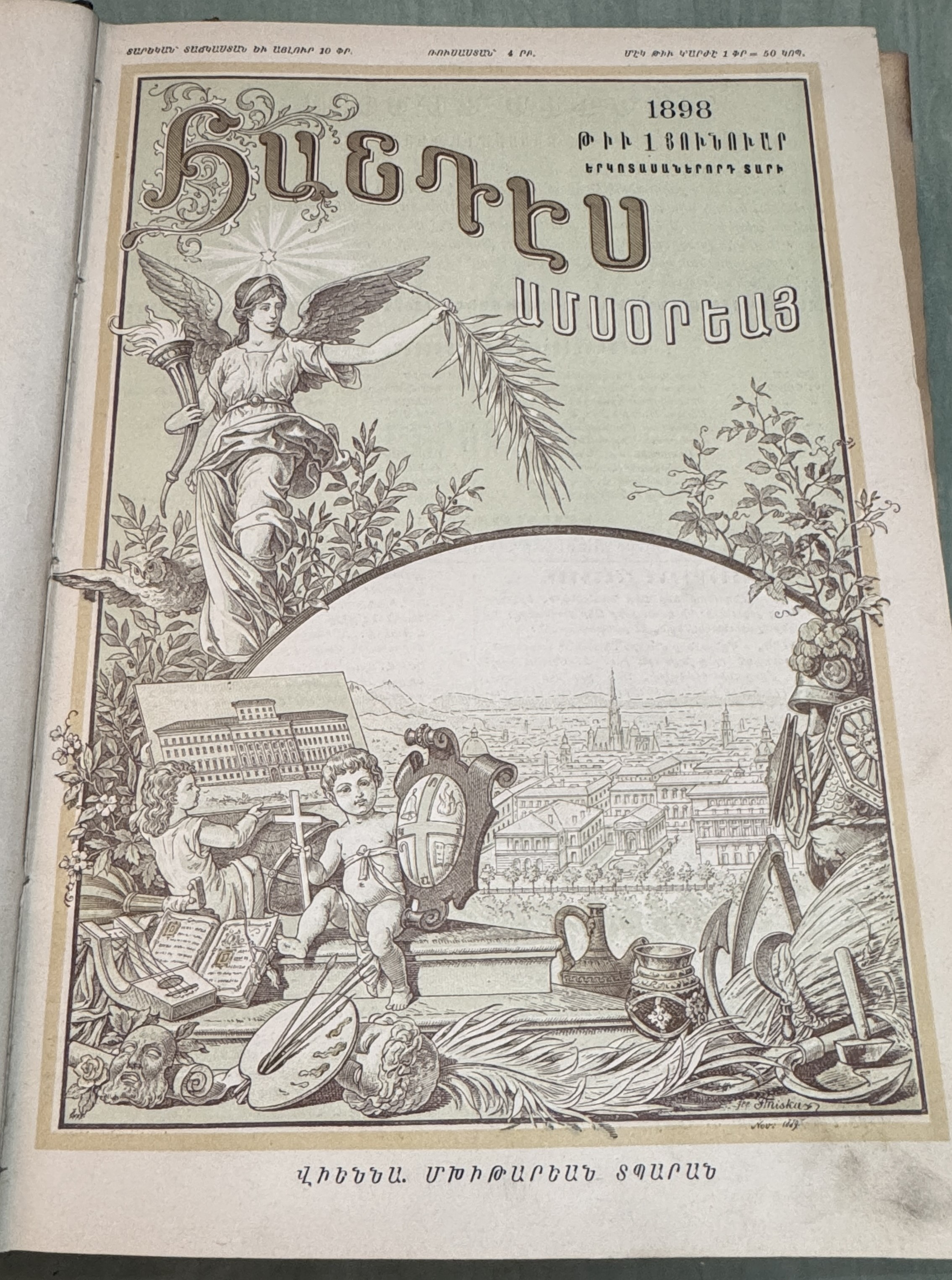
A cover of the Handes Amsorya

The Vienna branch of the Mekhitarists became particularly noted in the fields of philology and language influenced by the German penchant for rational thinking. The publications of the Mekhitarists, both in San Lazzaro and Vienna, contributed greatly to the refinement of literary Western Armenian.

The monastery had its own printing house until around 2000. Its publications are since printed in Yerevan. In early 20th century the publishing house of the Vienna Mekhitarists contained 70 Armenian fonts, more than any other. An 1839 English publication wrote that their "excellent printing establishment has issued a multitude of pious and useful publications."

The scholarly periodical Handes Amsorya ("Monthly Review") has been published by the Mekhitarists of Vienna since 1887. It is the second oldest Armenian periodical in print today. Besides numerous Armenian scholars, works of foreign scholars such as Heinrich Hübschmann and Nicholas Marr were also published in the journal. It served as the middle circle between Armenian and European scholarships.
