= Mikayel Chamchian =

Armenian Catholic monk (1738–1828)

- Միքայէլ Չամչեան
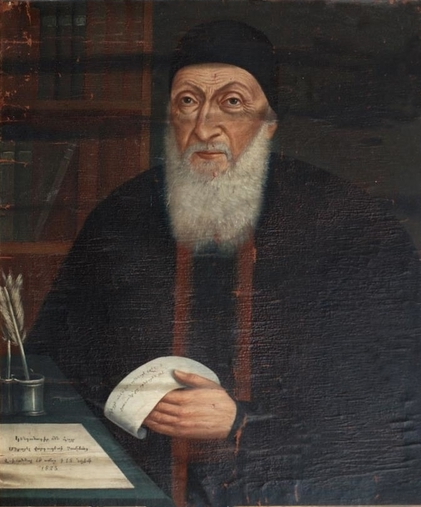
- Born: Garabed Chamchian; 4 December 1738; Constantinople, Ottoman Empire
- Died: November 30, 1823 (aged 84); Constantinople, Ottoman Empire
- Occupations: Monk; historian; grammarian; theologian

Mikayel Chamchian (Note: Occasionally Chamchiants (Armenian: Չամչեանց)․) (Armenian: Միքայէլ Չամչեան; 4 December 1738 – 30 November 1823), known also in English as Michael Chamich, was an Armenian Mekhitarist monk, historian, grammarian and theologian. He is best known for writing a comprehensive and influential history of Armenia in three volumes.

== Biography ==
Mikayel Chamchian (whose birth name was Garabed) was born in Constantinople on 4 December 1738 to Abraham Chamchian. He received his primary education in Constantinople's Catholic schools, then was trained as a jeweler by his distant relative, the imperial jeweler and amira Mikayel Chelebi Duzian. Although Chamchian gained renown as a jeweler and had the opportunity to join Duzian as a full business partner, he instead decided to abandon secular life and join the Mekhitarist Congregation. In March 1757, Chamchian left for the Mekhitarists' monastery on the island of San Lazzaro degli Armeni in Venice with a letter of recommendation from Mekhitarist fathers Mikayel Sebastatsi and Mkrtich Ananian and entered the Mekhitarist monastic academy. He took his monastic vows in 1759 and took the name Mikayel in honor of Mikayel Sebastatsi. Chamchian's elder brother Hakobos was also a Mekhitarist monk. After graduating from the academy in 1762, he was ordained priest and became a teacher at the monastery. It was at this time that Chamchian began researching and collecting materials for his future writings, although this work was interrupted in 1769 when Abbot Stepanos Melkonian ordained him vardapet and sent him to conduct missionary activities and tend to the spiritual needs of the Catholic Armenian community in Basra.

During his time as a missionary, Chamchian visited various Armenian communities in the Near East and sought out Armenian manuscripts—histories of Armenia in particular—to acquire or copy and send back to San Lazzaro. Chamchian returned to Venice in 1775 due to his poor health (exacerbated by the climate and outbreak of plague in Basra) and taught novices seeking to join the Mekhitarist Congregation. In 1779 he published his Kerakanutiun Haykazian Lezvi (Քերականութիւն Հայկազեան լեզուի, Grammar of the Armenian language), which was regarded as the best existing Classical Armenian grammar textbook for nearly a century and found wide use in Armenian schools. Chamchian's grammar was the first to reject Latin influence on Armenian grammar and was based on the study of select Classical Armenian texts from the 5th to 13th centuries.

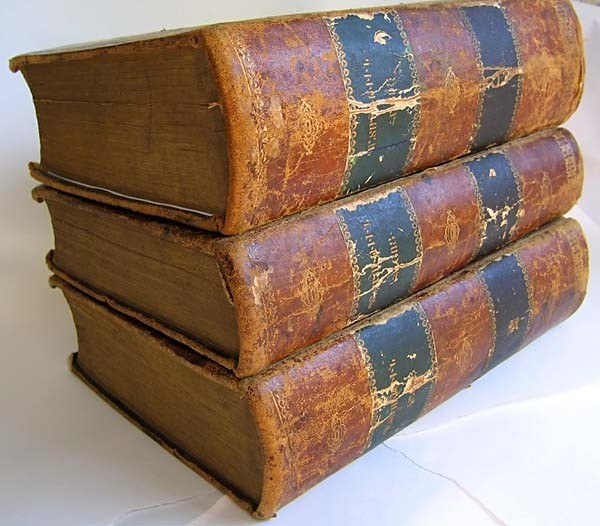
The three History of Armenia books

From 1785 to 1788, he published his monumental three-volume Patmutiun Hayots (Note: Full title: History of Armenia from the beginning of the world until the year of the Lord 1784 (Armenian: Պատմութիւն Հայոց ի սկզբանէ աշխարհի մինչև ցամ Տեառն 1784)․) (History of Armenia, inaccurately dated to 1784–1786). In this work, Chamchian sought to present a comprehensive history of Armenia from Creation to his own time using various Armenian and non-Armenian sources. He was meticulous in writing the history, frequently making changes and additions and delaying the final publication of the volumes in order to consult more sources as they became available to him. The History is divided into periods according to ruling Armenian dynasties and times of foreign domination. Chamchian provided a chronology for the legendary Armenian patriarchs (using the one laid down by Movses Khorenatsi in his History of Armenia as his source), dating Hayk's battle with Belus, and thus the formation of the Armenian people, to 2107 BC. He is also the source for the traditionally accepted date for the Christianization of Armenia as 301 AD. An abridged version of Chamchian's History was published in 1811 and it was later translated into English and Turkish (in Armenian letters).

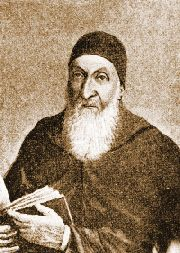
Drawing of Chamchian

The immense labor of writing and publishing History of Armenia took its toll on Chamchian's health, and in 1789 he was dismissed from his teaching position and sent to recover at sanatoria in Austria and Hungary. He first went to Trieste, then to the Armenian-populated Transylvanian town of Ibașfalău (Bashbalov or Yeghisabetupolis in Armenian, now called Dumbrăveni), where he remained until April 1790. While in Ibașfalău, Chamchian contributed greatly to the development of the local Armenian school and cultivated a plan for the creation of Armenian boarding schools. Despite the pleas of the local Armenian community for him to remain, Chamchian returned to Venice after recovering his health. His next major work was a commentary on the Book of Psalms (Meknutiun Saghmosats, 10 volumes), and most of his works from this period are on religious and theological subjects. He was sent away from Venice once again for health reasons to his birthplace, Constantinople, in early 1795. There, Chamchian acted as a senior Mekhitarist representative and resumed his historical writing and educational activities. Chamchian briefly returned to Venice in 1800 to participate in the election of the new abbot of the monastery on San Lazzaro following the death of Abbot Stepanos. Although the Mekhitarist monks attempted to keep Chamchian in Venice by appointing him supervisor of the monastic school, he returned to Constantinople at the request of the Armenian Catholic community there.

In his last years in Constantinople, Chamchian, together with other Mekhitarists, took steps to ease the conflict between Armenian Catholics and the Armenian Apostolic Church, although these efforts received support neither from Rome, nor from the Armenian Catholicosate. In 1815, a Catholic Armenian priest of the Antonine Order stole one of Chamchian's manuscripts, which contained his work Vahan Havato (Վահան Հաւատոյ, Shield of faith). This was a work defending the "orthodoxy" of the Armenian Church against the accusations of heresy. Chamchian believed that the Armenian Church had always been "orthodox" from a Roman Catholic perspective, i.e., that it never actually rejected Chalcedonian doctrine; this was a position that was accepted neither by Rome, nor by most Armenian converts to Catholicism, nor by the Armenian Church itself. Chamchian had reportedly been working on the book for over forty years and was still making adjustments to it shortly before it was stolen. The work was quickly condemned by the Roman Inquisition and sequestered in the archives of the Propaganda Fide. Multiple defective copies of the work—made before the original was sent to Rome—circulated, and one abridgment was preserved at the Armenian patriarchate of Jerusalem and later published in Calcutta in 1873. The original remains at the Propaganda Fide archives in Rome and has never been published.

Chamchian died in Constantinople on 30 November 1823 at the age of 86.

== Method and evaluation ==
Chamchian's History was the most popular Armenian history for nearly a hundred years. It was highly influential among Armenians and is credited with strengthening Armenian national consciousness. It has been called "the beginning of modern historiography for the Armenians"; Chamchian was the first Armenian historian to undertake the task of "gathering the manuscripts, of comparing the sources, of evaluating the degree of their reliability". However, it has also been criticized for failing to approach many of its sources critically and for "frequently accept[ing] sheer legends as solid facts." Chamchian never attempted to interpret historical facts and analyze their causation. The 19th-century intellectual Mikayel Nalbandian wrote that Chamchian attributes all of Armenia's misfortunes throughout history to divine punishment, "without citing the political causes, without evaluating with a critical eye any event in [Armenian] national life". Philosopher Marc Nichanian stated that Chamchian wrote according to the principles of pre-Enlightenment Christian universal history, according to which sacred texts are historical texts and documents are valuable "solely insofar as they are transmitted by 'witnesses' and by 'contemporaries.' "

One of Chamchian's intentions in his history was prove his belief that the Armenian Church had always been "orthodox" from a Roman Catholic perspective. This caused Chamchian to attempt to demonstrate that the 8th-century Armenian catholicos John of Odzun—usually viewed as the most extreme anti-Chalcedonian in Armenian church history—was not actually the author of the anti-Chalcedonian writings attributed to him. Chamchian also took up this issue in an appendix to his Vahan Havato.

== Sources ==
- Aslanian, Sebouh David (2025). "Khluats dzeṛagirě: Ditarkumner Chʻamchʻeani Vahan Havatoyin verabereal" Խլուած ձեռագիրը. Դիտարկումներ Չամչեանի Վահան Հաւատոյին վերաբերեալ. Handes Amsorya (in Armenian) (1–12): 193–236.
- Bardakjian, Kevork (1976). The Mekhitarist Contributions to Armenian Culture and Scholarship. Middle Eastern Dept., Harvard College Library. OCLC 644029601.
- Hacikyan, Agop J․; et al., eds. (2005). The Heritage of Armenian Literature, Volume III: From the Eighteenth Century to Modern Times. Detroit: Wayne State University Press. ISBN 0814332218.
- Kosyan, Aram (2019). "First Haykides and the "House of Torgom"". Fundamental Armenology. 2 (10). Armenian National Academy of Sciences: 84–105. ISSN 1829-4618.
- Nalbandian, Mikayel (1947). Erkeri liakatar zhoghovatsu Երկերի լիակատար ժողովածու [Complete works] (in Armenian). Vol. 2. Yerevan: Haykakan SSṚ Gitutʻyunneri akademiayi hratarakchʻutʻyun.
- Nichanian, Marc (1999). "Enlightenment and Historical Thought". In Hovannisian, Richard G.; Myers, David M. (eds.). Enlightenment and Diaspora: The Armenian and Jewish Cases. Atlanta, Georgia: Scholars Press. pp. 87–123. ISBN 0-7885-0604-8.
- Panossian, Razmik (2006). The Armenians: From Kings and Priests to Merchants and Commissars. New York: Columbia University Press. ISBN 9780231511339.
- Utujian, A. A. (1988). "Mikʻayel Chʻamchʻyan (kyankʻi ev gortsuneutʻyan hamaṛot urvagits)" Միքայել Չամչյան (կյանքի և գործունեության համառոտ ուրվագիծ) [Michael Chamchian (a short description of his life and activity)]. Lraber Hasarakakan Gitutyunneri (in Armenian) (9). Armenian National Academy of Sciences: 71–85. ISSN 0320-8117.
