= Mekhitarists =

Monastic order of the Armenian Catholic Church

Benedictine Congregation of the Mechitarists
- Benedictina Congregatio Mechitarista
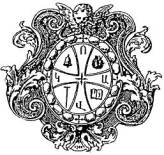
- Coat of arms of the Mekhitarist Order, from a book, 1900 ca.
- Abbreviation: C.A.M.
- Nickname: Mechitarists
- Established: 1701; 325 years ago
- Founder: Mekhitar of Sebaste
- Founded at: Constantinople
- Type: Monastic order of Pontifical Right for men
- Headquarters: Isola di San Lazzaro, Venezia-Lido, Italy
- Members: 32 members (includes 24 priests) as of 2015
- Parent organization: Armenian Catholic Church
- Website: www.mekhitariantoronto.org

The Mechitarists, officially the Benedictine Congregation of the Mechitarists (Latin: Benedictina Congregatio Mechitarista), is an Armenian Catholic monastic order founded in 1701 by Mekhitar of Sebaste. Members use the postnominal abbreviation CAM.

The order is best known for their series of scholarly publications of ancient Armenian versions of otherwise lost ancient Greek texts and their research on classical and modern Armenian language. They follow the Rule of Saint Benedict.

The congregation was previously divided into two branches, with the respective motherhouses being in Venice and Vienna. In July 2000, they united to form one institute.

== History ==
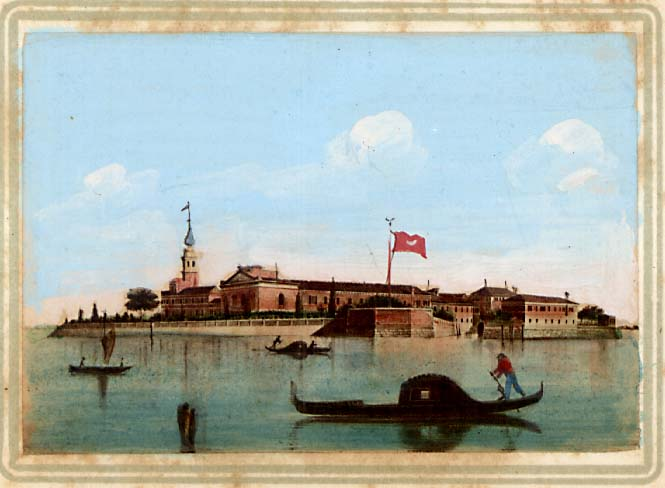
The island of San Lazzaro, with the monastery and the church of Mekhitarists.

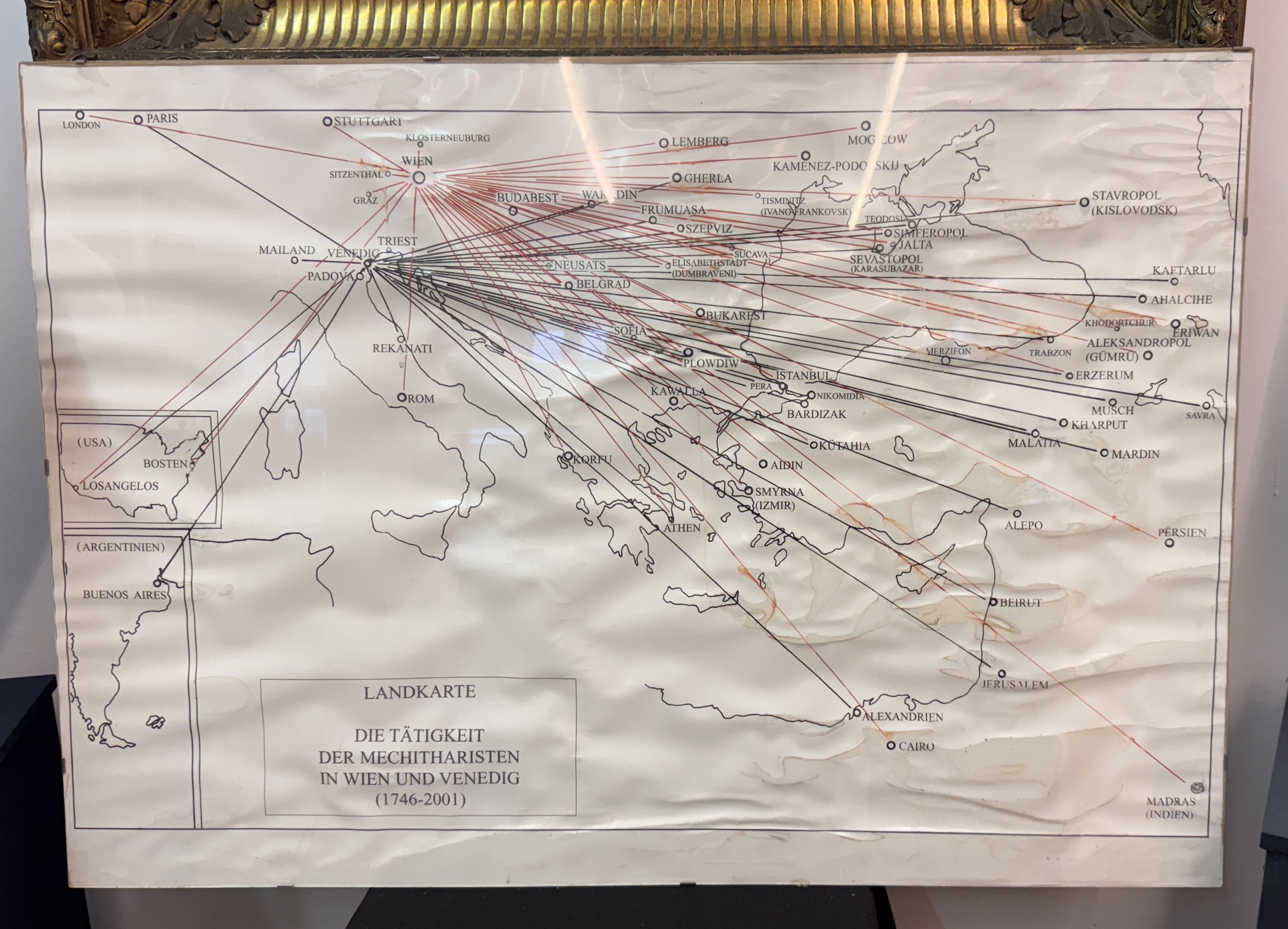
A map of Mekhitarist activity

Their eponymous founder, Mekhitar of Sebaste, was born in Sebastia in Armenia, then part of the Ottoman Empire, in 1676. He entered a monastery, but was concerned about the level of culture and education in Armenia under Turkish rule at that period, and sought to do something about it. Contacts with Western missionaries led him to become interested in translating material from the West into Armenian and setting up a religious order to facilitate education.

Mekhitar set out for Rome in 1695 to make his ecclesiastical studies there, but he was compelled by illness to abandon the journey and return to Armenia. In 1696 he was ordained a priest and for four years worked among his people.

In 1700 Mekhitar went to Constantinople and began to gather disciples around him. Mekhitar formally joined the Latin Church, and in 1701, with sixteen companions, he formed a religious order of which he became the superior. They encountered the opposition of other Armenians and were compelled to move to the Morea (Peloponnese), at that time Venetian territory, where they built a monastery in 1706. At its inception the order was seen as an attempted reform of Eastern monachism. Jesuit priest Filippo Bonanni wrote of the arrival of two Armenian monks, Elias Martyr and Joannes Simon, sent by Mekhitar to Pope Clement XI to offer the most humble subjection of himself and convent (Ut ei se cum suis religiosis humillime subjiceret). At that time, there was no mention of the Rule of Saint Benedict. Pope Clement XI gave his approval to the order in 1712. The monks began a foundation in Modon with Mekhitar as abbot.

On the outbreak of hostilities between the Turks and Venetians they migrated to Venice, and the island of San Lazzaro was given to them in 1717. This has remained the headquarters of the congregation to this date; Mekhitar died there in 1749, leaving his order firmly established.

The order became very wealthy from gifts. The behaviour of the Abbot Stepanos Melkonian caused a group of monks to leave in disgust and elect their own abbot, first at Trieste and then in 1810 at Vienna. They also established a printing press. The printing of Armenian books was by this time of great financial importance and the Republic of Venice made considerable efforts to encourage their return; however, they was unsuccessful.

In 1810, all the other monastic institutions in Venice were abolished by Napoleon, but the Mekhitarists were specifically exempted from the decree.

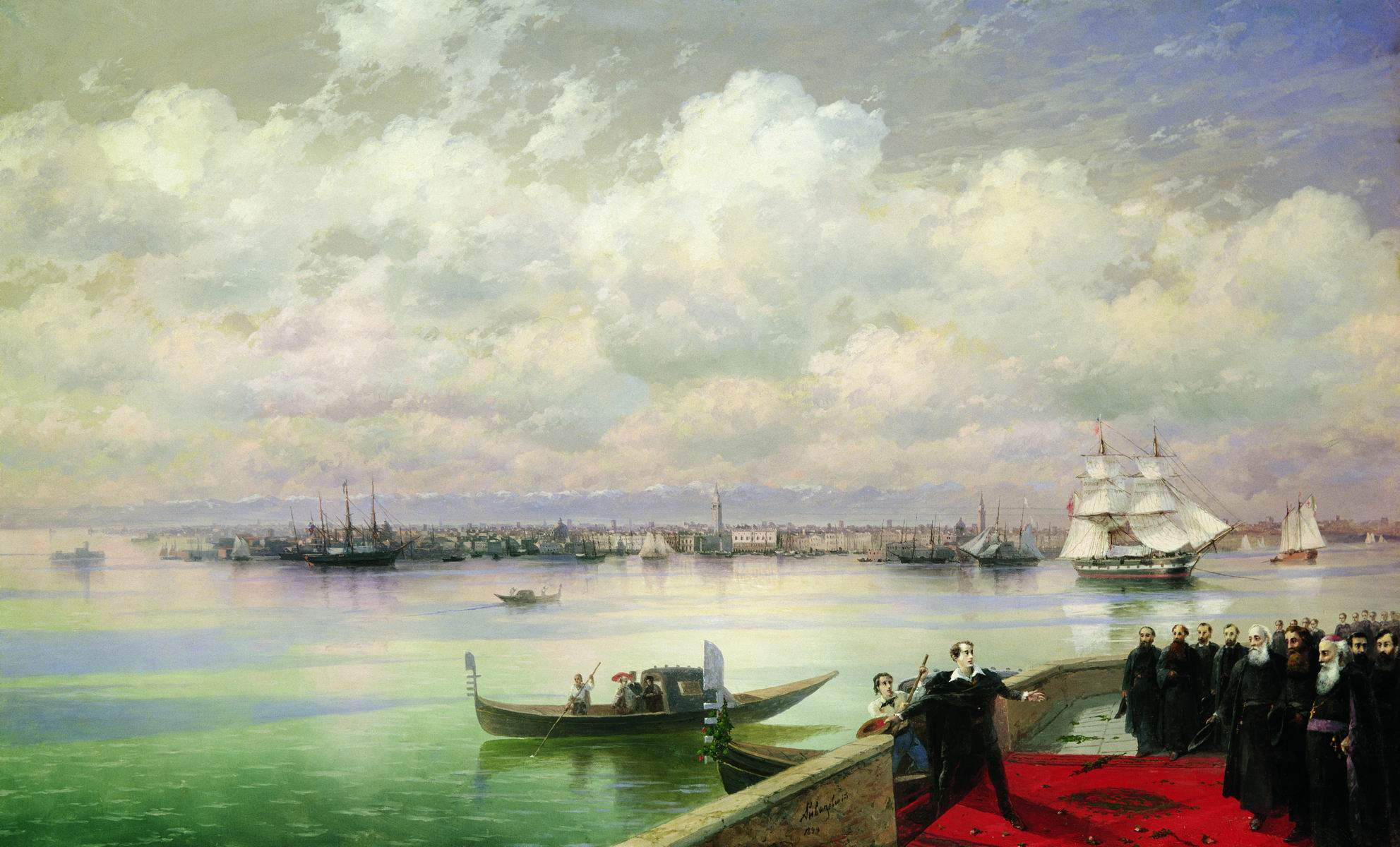
Byron's visit to San Lazzaro in 1816

Lord Byron visited the monastery on Wednesday 13 November, 1816. His companion John Cam Hobhouse left this account of the visit:

Byron and I then went in [a] gondola to [the] establishment of St Lazare. It was some time before we were let in – the brothers were at prayer, but when we walked into their church one of them bowed out and most courteously showed us about. Unfortunately the key to the library was not to be found – the keeper of it was out. We saw the neat galleries and little chambers of the fathers, with Armenian letters over them. Our conductor showed us a man’s dictionary of Armenian and Latin – told us there were about forty frati and eighteen pupils, some few from Armenia, but mostly Constantinople. One has been in London and talks English. The youths learn Latin, all of them, and some Greek – also German and French some – and all Italian – English will now be taught.

Those who please of the pupils enter the order (they have revenues on the mainland). Zanetto said Napoleon despoiled them, but our conductor contradicted this, and said that he gave a decree from Paris saving this brotherhood from the fate of the other monasteries on account of their patriotic labours for their countrymen. We saw their press, where eight men are employed, when we saw them on an Armenian Testament. They are now on a translation of Rollin. Their average is four books a year. They are all for the use of the Armenian nation, and all printed, as our guide said, in the literal (literary/classical) Armenian. They are shipped for Constantinople, and there sold.

The dining-hall set out there looked like a Cambridge dining-hall – and the establishment is about 100 years old founded by one [Mekhitar], whose picture is in the refectory. It did our hearts good to see the place. We are to return and see the library. They are all Catholics.

== The Schism of 1773 ==
One of the most significant moments in the history of the Mekhitarist order was the schism of 1773, which not only had an impact on the structure and the future of the order but also on the Armenian church itself. The formation of the Armenian Catholic group could be seen as the product of the division inside this ethnic community.

The schism reached a breaking point in 1773 when a group of Armenian monks under the direction of Ghevont Alishan, a follower of Mechitar, publicly seceded from the Armenian Apostolic Church and founded the Armenian Catholic Church. As a result of the schism, the Armenian community was severely divided; many Armenians chose to continue to support the Armenian Apostolic Church.

After the division, a new branch of the Mekhitarist order was formed in Trieste which then belonged to the Habsburgs. When Trieste was occupied by the French in 1805, the Triestine Mekhitarists lost all their property because they were seen as Habsburg subjects. In 1837, the new branch of the order moved to Vienna, where it remains today. The Venice branch remained focused on the preservation of the Armenian language and the translation of old Armenian books and manuscripts. It started translating the books and the manuscripts into different languages, which helped popularize Armenian culture. They also started educational systems where the monks of the order would teach the Armenian heritage.

== Organization ==
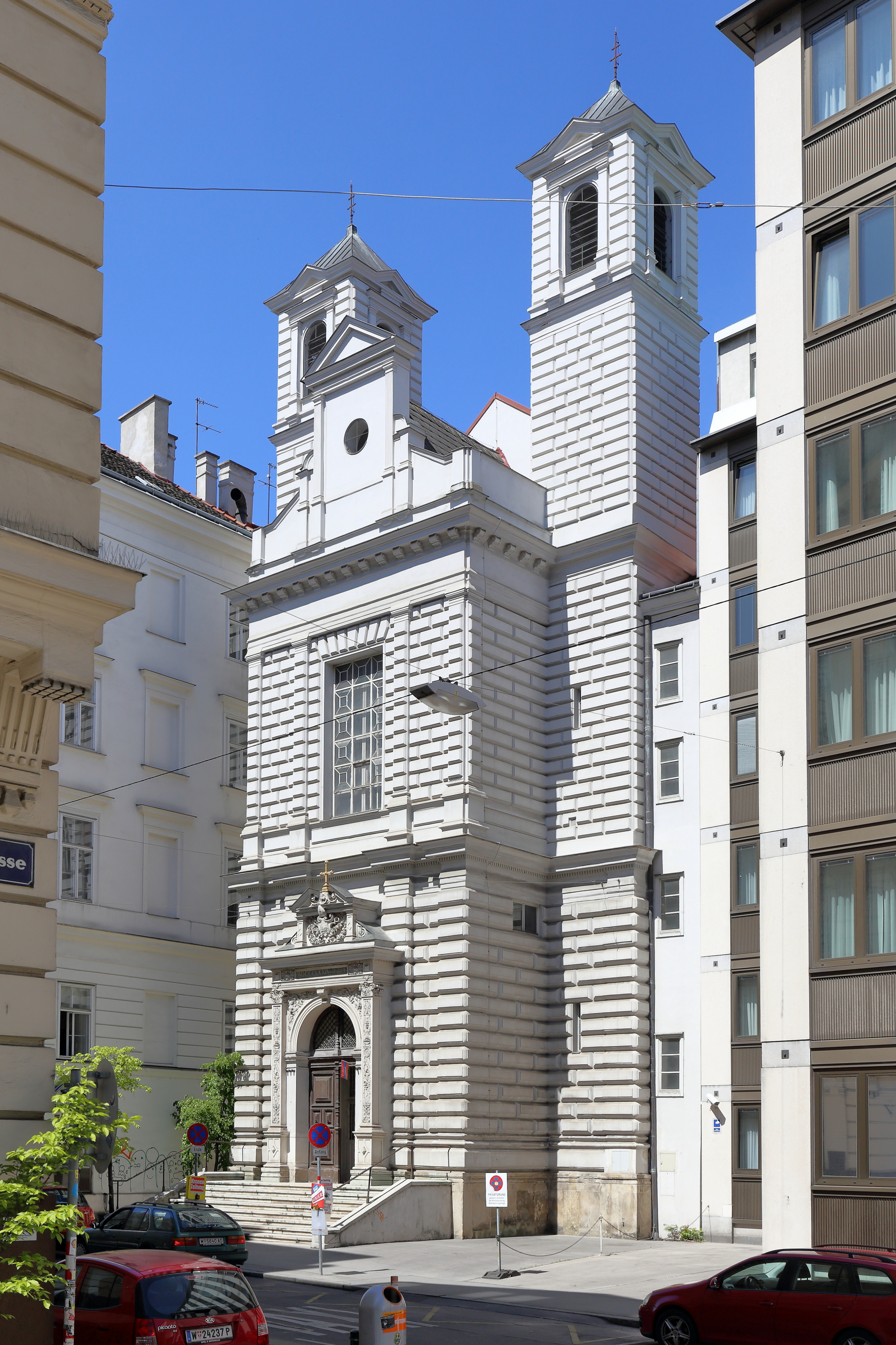
The Mekhitarist Monastery in Vienna, Austria.

While the Mekhitarists live under the Rule of Saint Benedict, they are considered their own religious order separate from the Benedictines, similar to the Cistercians. They are hence not considered a congregation within the Order of Saint Benedict.

The main abbeys are San Lazzaro degli Armeni in Venice and the Mekhitarist Monastery in Vienna. There is a large convent and college for lay students at Padua, the legacy of a pious Armenian who died at Madras. In the year 1846 another rich benefactor, Samuel Morin, founded a similar establishment at Paris. Other houses were established in Austria-Hungary, Russia, Persia and Turkey—fourteen in all, according to early 20th century statistics, with 152 monks, the majority of whom are priests. While not large for an order hundreds of years old, its extension was necessarily restricted because of its exclusive devotion to persons and things Armenian.

In 1911, they had 15 establishments in various places in Asia Minor and Europe with approximately 150 monks, all Armenians; they used the Armenian language and rite in the liturgy.

== Monastic life ==
After a novitiate of 2 years, monks take the usual religious vows, along with a fourth vow—"to give obedience to the preceptor or master deputed by their superior to teach them the dogmas of the Catholic Faith". Many of them vow themselves also to missionary work in Armenia, Persia and Turkey, where they live on alms and wear as a badge, beneath the tunic, a cross of red cloth, on which are certain letters signifying their desire to shed their blood for the Catholic faith. They promise on oath to work together in harmony so that they may the better win the schismatics back to God. They elect an abbot for life, who has the power to dismiss summarily any of his monks who should prove disorderly. They wear the beard, Oriental fashion, and have a black habit: tunic, cloak and hood. In an engraving, the Mekhitarist would be indistinguishable from a friar of the Order of St. Augustine, except for his beard.

The Mekhitarists at first followed the rule attributed to Anthony the Great, but when they settled in the West modifications from the Rule of Saint Benedict were introduced. The use of the Rule of Saint Benedict represented the introduction of Western monasticism into the East, where up to this time a monk had no duty or vocation but to fill his place in the monastery and save his soul in the cloister, having broken off all relations with the outside world and had no idea of performing any works other than his choir duties, prayers, fastings, and the monastic observance. Under the Rule of Saint Benedict, a monk would be expected to devote himself to some useful work and take some thought of his neighbour. This adoption of the rule was desired by Mekhitar and his monks, having a desire to devote themselves to apostolic work among their schismatic brethren, to instruct their ignorance, excite their devotion and bring them back into the communion with the Catholic Church. At the same time, it also offered security against lapsing into apathy and inactivity.

Missionaries, writers and educationists, devoted to the service of their Armenian brethren wherever they might be found, such are these Benedictines of the Eastern Church. Their subjects usually enter the convent at an early age (8 or 9 years old), receive in it their elementary schooling, and spend about 9 years in philosophical and theological study. At the canonical age of 25, if they are sufficiently prepared, they are ordained priests by their bishop-abbot, and are then employed by him in the various enterprises of the order. First, there is the work of the mission—not the conversion of the heathen, but priestly ministry to the Armenian communities settled in most of the commercial centres of Europe. With this is joined, where needed and possible, the apostolate of union with Rome. Next there is the education of the Armenian youth and, associated with this, the preparation and publication of good and useful Armenian literature.

The four main aspects of their work:

1. they have brought out editions of important early Christian works, some Armenian, others translated into Armenian from Greek and Syriac originals no longer extant;
2. until the late 20th century, they printed and circulated Armenian literature among the Armenians, thereby exercising a powerful educational influence;
3. they have founded primary and secondary schools in various locations, four of which are still operational: Pangaltı Ermeni İlköğretim Okulu ve Lisesi in Istanbul, founded in 1825; in Beirut, founded in 1930; in Buenos Aires founded in 1956; and in Los Angeles, founded in 1979;
4. they work as Eastern Catholic missionaries in Armenia.

=== Literary and artistic activities ===
Mekhitar is credited for initiating the study of the Armenian writings of the fourth and fifth centuries, which has resulted in the development and adoption of a Classical Armenian literary language, nearly as distinct from the vulgar tongue as Latin is from Italian. This provided modern Armenian with a literary connection to its ancient past and literature.

Mekhitar's versions of The Imitation of Christ and the Bible began the series of translations of great books, continued unceasingly during two centuries, and ranging from the early Fathers of the Church and the works of Thomas Aquinas (one of their first labors) to Homer and Virgil and the best known poets and historians of later days.

Ariel Agemian illustrated the Imitation and contributed several major portraits of Mekhitarist monks and religious scenes. He is also known for documenting the Turkish Massacre from his own recollections.

At one period, in connexion with their Vienna house, there existed an association for the propagation of Catholic books, which is said to have distributed nearly a million volumes, and printed and published six new works each year. To him also they owe the guidance of their first steps in exegesis—the branch of learning in which they have won most distinction—and the kindred studies of the liturgy and the religious history of their country.

At San Lazzaro, he founded the printing press from which the most notable of their productions have been issued, and began to produce the collection of Armenian manuscripts for which their library is known for.

The principal contributions of the Mekitarists to Armenian Catholicism have been their periodicals and manuals, Bibles, maps, engravings, dictionaries, histories, geographies and other contributions to educational and popular literature.

The following are the most valuable of their contributions to the common cause of learning. Firstly the recovery, in ancient Armenian translations, of some lost works of the Church Fathers. Among them may be noted Letters (thirteen) of St. Ignatius of Antioch and a fuller and more authentic "History of the Martyrdom of St. Ignatius"; some works of Ephrem the Syrian, notably a sort of "Harmony of the Gospels" and a "Commentary on the Epistles of St. Paul"; an edition of Eusebius's Ecclesiastical History. The publication of these works is due to the famous Mekhitarist Pascal Aucher, who was assisted in the last of them by Cardinal Mai. Pascal Aucher (Harut'iwn Awgerian: 1774–1855) also became Lord Byron's tutor in Armenian, and his "spiritual pastor and master". Aucher also translated "Armenian Missal" (Tübingen, 1845) and "Dom Johannis philosophi Ozniensis Armeniorum Catholici (AD 718) Opera" (Venice, 1534) into German, and Paradise Lost into Armenian (1824).

Two original historical works may also be noted: "The History of Armenia", by Mikayel Chamchian (1784–1786) and the "Quadro della storia letteraria di Armenia" by Sukias Somal (Venice, 1829).

The monks work to promote both Catholicism and Armenian patriotism. Their goals include the preservation of Armenian language and literature. Individually, the monks are distinguished by their linguistic accomplishments, and the Vienna establishment has attracted attention by the institution of a Literary Academy, which confers honorary membership without regard to race or religion.

== See also ==
- Ghevont Alishan
- Mikayel Chamchian

== Sources and references ==
- Bardakjian, Kevork. The Mekhitarist Contributions to Armenian Culture and Scholarship. Cambridge, Harvard College Library, 1976.
- Bore, E. Vita del servo di Dio Mechitar (Venice, 1901); Saint-Lazare (1835)
- Max Heimbucher. Orden u. Kongregationen (1907) I.37
- articles in Wetzer u. Welte, Kirchenlexicon (ed. 2) and Herzog, Realencyklopädie (ed. 3)
- articles by Sargisean, a Mechitarist, in Rivista storica benedettina (1906), La Congregazione Mechitarista.
- Casanova, Giacomo. History of My Life, p. 265. (Excerpts at Google books)
- Mekhitarist Alumni Association Toronto Canada. World Wide Members - http://www.mekhitariantoronto.org/
