= List of Guggenheim Fellowships awarded in 1994 =

List of Guggenheim Fellowships awarded in 1994.

Fellow	Category	Field of Study
Carolyn Abbate	Humanities	Music Research
Yolanda Andrade	Creative Arts	Photography
Joyce Appleby	Humanities	U.S. History
Carol Armstrong	Humanities	Photography Studies
Patricia Aufderheide	Humanities	Film, Video, & Radio Studies
Thomas Banks	Natural Sciences	Physics
Robert L. Belknap		Literary Criticism
Sven Birkerts		General Nonfiction
Joan S. Birman		Mathematics
David Blackbourn		German & East European History
Edward J. Blakely		Architecture, Planning, & Design
Richard K. Bloes		Video & Audio
Michael Book	Creative Arts	Photography
Richard D. Bosman		Fine Arts
Constance Brittain Bouchard		Medieval History
Michael T. Bowers		Chemistry
Simon Brailowsky		Neuroscience
Emily Breer	Creative Arts	Film
Charles L. Briggs		Folklore & Popular Culture
Kevin Bubriski	Creative Arts	Photography
Giorgio Buccellati		Near Eastern Studies
Martín Caparrós		Fiction
Charles Capper		American Literature
Peter Carafiol		American Literature
Squeak Carnwath		Fine Arts
Joseph C. Carter		Classics
Donald L. D. Caspar		Molecular & Cellular Biology
Moses V. Chao		Molecular & Cellular Biology
Bernard Chazelle		Computer Science
Mark A. Cheetham		Fine Arts Research
Carmen Clapp		Medicine & Health
William A. V. Clark		Geography & Environmental Studies
Lawrence M. Clopper		Medieval Literature
Tony Cokes		Video & Audio
Corrine Colarusso		Fine Arts
Eleanor Cook		Literary Criticism
Meg Cranston		Fine Arts
William Cronon		U.S. History
Pamela Kyle Crossley		East Asian Studies
Paul D\'Amato	Creative Arts	Photography
Lorraine Daston		History of Science & Technology
Margreta de Grazia		English Literature
Guillermo de la Peña		Anthropology & Cultural Studies
Diego de Mendoza		Molecular & Cellular Biology
Cesáreo A. Dominguez		Physics
Mark Doty		Poetry
Ann duCille		American Literature
Adam M. Dziewonski		Earth Science
Antonia Eiriz		Fine Arts
Veit Elser	Natural Sciences	Physics
Geraldine Erman	Creative Arts	Fine Arts
William N. Eskridge	Social Sciences	Law
Jeffrey Eugenides	Creative Arts	Fiction
Johanna Filp-Hanke	Social Sciences	Education
Michael H. Freedman	Natural Sciences	Mathematics
Paul H. Freedman	Humanities	Medieval History
Guido Garay		Astronomy—Astrophysics
Cristina García		Fiction
Leon Glass		Applied Mathematics
Benny Golson		Music Composition
Ron Gorchov		Fine Arts
Claudia Gordillo Castellon	Creative Arts	Photography
Eamon Grennan		Poetry
Bruce G. Harmon		Drama & Performance Art
John B. Haviland		Linguistics
Daniel R. Headrick		Intellectual & Cultural History
Brenda Hillman		Poetry
Tony Hiss		General Nonfiction
Irene Hultman	Creative Arts	Choreography
Michael Hurson		Fine Arts
Javier Iguiñiz Echeverria	Social Sciences	Economics
David Isay	Creative Arts	Video & Audio
Laurence A. Jacobs		Medicine & Health
Pierre Jalbert		Music Composition
Clive G. Jones		Plant Sciences
Thom Jones		Fiction
Alice Kaplan		French Literature
Randall Kenan		Fiction
Alexander Keyssar		U.S. History
Gary King		Political Science
Karl Kirchwey		Poetry
Nancy S. Kollmann		Russian History
David Konstan		Classics
Beryl Korot		Video & Audio
Guto Lacaz		Fine Arts
Cathy C. Laurie		Organismic Biology & Ecology
Lawrence W. Levine		U.S. History
Margrit Lewczuk		Fine Arts
Elizabeth Macklin		Poetry
Nelson Manrique		Iberian & Latin American History
Maria Luiza Marcílio		Iberian & Latin American History
Robert D. Mare		Education
Mary Ellen Mark	Creative Arts	Photography
Sarah Maza		French History
Christopher Münch	Creative Arts	Film
James McManus		Poetry
Patrick McNaughton		African Studies
Dante Medina		Fiction
Bruce A. Menge		Organismic Biology & Ecology
David Lee Miller		Literary Criticism
Anthony Molho		Renaissance History
Carlos Monge C.		Medicine & Health
Sally Falk Moore		Anthropology & Cultural Studies
Kathy Muehlemann		Fine Arts
James Naremore	Humanities	Film, Video, & Radio Studies
María Negroni	Creative Arts	Poetry
Dona Nelson		Fine Arts
Jon C. Nelson		Music Composition
Jeff W. Nichols		Music Composition
Robert E. Oswald	Natural Sciences	Molecular & Cellular Biology
Tina Packer		Drama & Performance Art
Euzhan Palcy	Creative Arts	Film
Gustavo M. Pastor		Physics
Douglas Lane Patey		English Literature
Jim Paul	Creative Arts	Biography
Dale Peck		Fiction
Linda Levy Peck		British History
Cristina Peri Rossi		Fiction
Elizabeth J. Perry		Political Science
Michael Pirrung		Chemistry
Elena Poniatowska		Fiction
Lourdes Portillo	Creative Arts	Film
Jill Quadagno	Social Sciences	Sociology
Alan Rath		Fine Arts
Abraham Ravett	Creative Arts	Film
Edward S. Reed		Psychology
Thomas Richards		English Literature
Charles H. Robert		Molecular & Cellular Biology
John W. Roberts		Folklore & Popular Culture
Henry L. Roediger III		Psychology
Nelbia Romero Cabrera		Fine Arts
Michael Rose		Education
Mary Ames Rouse		Bibliography
Karl Rubin		Mathematics
Daniel L. Rubinfeld		Economics
Conrad Rudolph		Fine Arts Research
Martin J. S. Rudwick	Humanities	History of Science & Technology
Peter Sahlins		French History
Beatriz Sarlo		Latin American Literature
Matilde Sánchez		Fiction
Daniel Schavelzon		Architecture, Planning, & Design
Richard B. Sher		Bibliography
Ed Smith		Fine Arts
Doris Sommer		Latin American Literature
Andrew Spence	Creative Arts	Fine Arts
Willard Spiegelman		American Literature
Leo Spitzer		Iberian & Latin American History
Lisa Stancati	Creative Arts	Photography
Christine Stansell		U.S. History
Paul J. Steinhardt		Astronomy—Astrophysics
Mark Steinmetz	Creative Arts	Photography
Andrew Stewart		Classics
Paul A. Stoller		African Studies
Nicholas J. Strausfeld		Neuroscience
Paul Strohm		Medieval Literature
Fernando Daniel Suárez		Mathematics
Cyrus C. Taylor	Natural Sciences	Physics
Talbot J. Taylor	Humanities	Intellectual & Cultural History
Blake Temple	Natural Sciences	Applied Mathematics
Robert Tibshirani	Natural Sciences	Statistics
Sidney Tillim	Creative Arts	Fine Arts
George W. S. Trow	Creative Arts	General Nonfiction
Robert-Jan van Pelt	Humanities	German & East European History
Alejandro Viñao	Creative Arts	Music Composition
Lawrence Weiner	Creative Arts	Fine Arts
Jessica Williams	Creative Arts	Music Composition
Sue Williams	Creative Arts	Fine Arts
Edwin N. Wilmsen	Social Sciences	Anthropology & Cultural Studies
Jonathan Wilson	Creative Arts	Fiction
Thongchai Winichakul	Humanities	South Asian Studies
Jay Alan Yim	Creative Arts	Music Composition
Peter Y. Yu	Natural Sciences	Physics
Jonathan Zeitlin	Humanities	Economic History
Barbie Zelizer	Humanities	Intellectual & Cultural History
Ziony Zevit	Humanities	Religion
Long Zhou	Creative Arts	Music Composition

== See also ==
- Guggenheim Fellowship
