= Elissa S. Epel =

American health psychologist

- Born: Carmel-by-the-Sea, California, US
- Parent(s): David Epel; Lois Epel

Academic background
- Education: Pitzer College; BA, psychology and psychobiology, Stanford University; PhD, Psychology, 1999, Yale University
- Thesis: Can stress shape your body?: stress and cortisol reactivity among women with central body fat distribution (1999)
- Academic advisors: Peter Salovey, Jeannette Ickovics, Kelly D. Brownell

Elissa Sarah Epel is an American health psychologist. She is a professor in the Department of Psychiatry at the University of California, San Francisco (UCSF); director of UCSF's Aging, Metabolism, and Emotion Center; and associate director of the Center for Health and Community.

== Early life and education ==
Epel was born in Carmel-by-the-Sea, California, to biologist David Epel and psychologist Lois Epel. Growing up, she would follow her father to Woods Hole, Massachusetts, during the summer and study in marine laboratories. Upon graduating from Carmel High School in 1986, she attended Pitzer College and worked as a resident assistant. She spent two years there before transferring to Stanford University for her Bachelor of Arts degree in zoology. Following Stanford, Epel intended on becoming a doctor and worked as a research assistant at the University of California, San Francisco (UCSF). While there, she realized she wished to pursue a career in health psychology and enrolling in graduate school.

Epel completed her PhD in clinical and health psychology at Yale University and her clinical internship at the VA Palo Alto Health Care System. She wrote her dissertation under the guidance of Peter Salovey, Jeannette Ickovics, and Kelly Brownell. Epel then returned to UCSF for her postdoctoral fellowship in psychology and medicine under the advisory of Nancy Adler.

== Career ==
Upon completing her formal education, Epel was appointed an assistant professor in the Department of Psychiatry at UCSF in 2002. In this role, she led a research team in studying 39 women between the ages of 20 and 50 who experienced stress as caregivers of chronically ill children. They examined the telomeres and telomerase in women. Their results indicated that doctors could monitor telomere length and telomerase levels for signs of adverse effects. In 2007, Epel led another study showing a correlation between weight gain and stress.

During her tenure, Epel founded the UCSF Center for Obesity Assessment, Study, and Treatment and directed the Aging, Metabolism, and Emotions Lab. She was also the associate director of the UCSF Center for Health and Community and UCSF Nutrition Obesity Research Center. As a result of her research on stress pathways, Epel was elected a member of the National Academy of Medicine in 2016. The following year, she was recognized as an "Influencer in Aging" by the Alliance for Aging Research for her "for her groundbreaking work on the psychological, social, and behavioral processes related to chronic psychological stress which accelerate biological aging."

Epel co-published her first book with Elizabeth Blackburn in 2017, titled The Telomere Effect: A Revolutionary Approach to Living Younger, Healthier, Longer. While studying telomeres and the replenishing enzyme, telomerase, they discovered a vital role played by these protective caps that revolved around one central idea: aging of cells. Since telomeres shorten with every division of a cell, replenishing these caps is essential to long-term cell growth. Through research and data, they explained that people that lead stressful lives exhibit less telomerase functioning in the body, which leads to a decrease in the dividing capabilities of the cell. Once telomeres shorten drastically, the cells can no longer divide, meaning the tissues they replenish with every division would therefore die out, highlighting the aging mechanism in humans. To increase telomerase activity in people with stress-filled lives, they suggested moderate exercise, even 15 minutes a day, which has been proven to stimulate telomerase activity and replenish the telomere.

During the COVID-19 pandemic, Epel created a free webinar series focused on facilitating reentry to ease people's anxieties about the new normal. She also published "The Geroscience Agenda: Toxic Stress, Hormetic Stress, and the Rate of Aging" through the Ageing Research Reviews. Her research team was also named the winner of the inaugural round of Healthy Longevity Catalyst Awards, a multiyear, multimillion-dollar international competition seeking breakthrough innovations to extend human health and function later in life. Their project was focused on testing the potency of hormetic stress to reduce depression and slow biological aging. In 2021, Epel was recognized by Clarivate as being among as one of the top 1% of researchers globally. Epel also released her second book, The Stress Prescription: 7 Days to More Joy and Ease, which was named a 2023 Independent Book Store bestseller in health and fitness.

== Selected publications ==
- The Telomere Effect: the New Science of Living Younger (2017)
- The Stress Prescription: Seven Days to More Joy and Ease (The Seven Days Series) (2022)
