= Breer =

Breer is a surname. Notable people with the surname include:

- Albert Breer (born 1980), American football journalist and reporter
- Carl Breer (1883–1970), American automotive industry engineer
- Emily Breer (born 1960), American filmmaker
- Murle Breer (born 1939), American golfer
- Nicolas Breer (born 1992), German politician
- Robert Breer (1926–2011), American experimental filmmaker, painter, and sculptor
