= Scott F. Gilbert =

American biologist and historian of biology

- Education: Wesleyan University (BA); Johns Hopkins University (MA); Johns Hopkins University (PhD)
- Title: Howard A. Schneiderman '48 Professor Emeritus in Biology at Swarthmore College

Scott Frederick Gilbert (born 1949) is an American evolutionary developmental biologist and historian of biology.

Scott Gilbert is the Howard A. Schneiderman Professor of Biology (emeritus) at Swarthmore College and a Finland Distinguished Professor (emeritus) at the University of Helsinki.

== Education ==
He obtained his B.A. in both biology and religion from Wesleyan University (1971). In 1976, he received his MA (history of science, under the aegis of Donna Haraway) and his PhD (biology, in the laboratory of Barbara Migeon) from the Johns Hopkins University. His postdoctoral work at the University of Wisconsin–Madison, pursued research on ribosome synthesis in the laboratory of Masayasu Nomura (1976–1978) and investigated developmental immunology in the laboratory of Robert Auerbach (1978–1980).

== Academic career ==
Gilbert is the author of the textbook Developmental Biology (first edition, 1985, and now in its 13th edition, 2023) and has also co-authored (with David Epel) the textbook Ecological Developmental Biology (2009, 2015). He has been credited with helping initiate evolutionary developmental biology and ecological developmental biology as new biological disciplines.

Gilbert's early biological research includes documenting the first pyrimidine-initiated RNA transcripts, elucidating the mechanisms by which antibodies inactivate poliovirus, and studying the roles of paracrine factors in kidney and lung branching. After co-authoring an early paper in evolutionary developmental biology, he inaugurated a project on the development of turtle shells. With collaborator Judith Cebra-Thomas, Gilbert elucidated the roles of several paracrine factors involved in carapace formation and made the unexpected conclusion that the plastron was derived from trunk neural crest cells. The latter studies led to the hypothesis that the turtle evolved by respecifying its cell types. His most recent studies concern the development of the holobiont and the importance of plasticity and symbiotic microbes during normal animal development. He has argued that the holobiont is an important unit of evolutionary selection.

Gilbert's research in the history and philosophy of biology concerns the interactions of genetics and embryology; feminist critiques of biology; Antireductionism; the formation of biological disciplines; and Bioethics. Some of these studies have documented the origins of the gene theory from embryological controversies, the formation of molecular biology and biochemistry as separate disciplines, the importance of feminist critique as a normative control in cell and developmental biology, and the importance of the environment in phenotype production. His work in the interactions of biology and religion have included extensive analysis of wonder, as well as studies of when different groups of biologists claim that individual human life begins. He has identified (with Ziony Zevit) the bone from which Eve was generated, analyzed embryonic imagery in the art of Gustav Klimt, Diego Rivera, and Frida Kahlo, and has provided one of the first analyses of nerd humor. His biology textbooks have been experiments in the interactions between biology and its social critiques.

Gilbert is frequently invited to lecture on this subject and has given this talk to diverse audiences from around the country to the Vatican. This lecture was recorded at the annual conference sponsored by the Association of Reproductive Health Professionals, Planned Parenthood of America, and the Society of Family Planning. His commitment to sexual and reproductive rights is evident in the article he wrote for San Francisco Chronicle, in which at the end he asks to support Planned Parenthood.

== Personal life ==
Scott F. Gilbert is the son of Marvin (Bud) and Elaine Caplan Gilbert. He was raised in East Rockaway, New York, . He is married to Anne Raunio (m.1971), and has three children and two grandchildren. In 2015, Gilbert became emeritus professor at both Swarthmore College and the University of Helsinki, and in 2016 he moved with Anne to Portland, Oregon, where he is on the Asian Arts Council of the Portland Art Museum.

== Honors ==
=== Honorary doctorates ===
- University of Helsinki (Finland, 2000)
- University of Tartu, (Estonia, 2011)

=== Awards and honors ===
- Phi Beta Kappa (1970)
- Sigma Xi (1980)
- Medal of François I (Collège de France, 1996)
- Fellow, AAAS (1998)
- John Simon Guggenheim Fellow (1999)
- Honorary member, St. Petersburg Society of Naturalists, St. Petersburg, Russia (2001)
- Viktor Hamburger Outstanding Educator Prize (Society for Developmental Biology, 2002)
- Alexander Kowalevsky Medal (2004)
- Biosemiotics Achievement Award (2015)
- Lecture in developmental biology presented to the 14th Dalai Lama (2016)
- Service Award from the Pan-American Society for Evolutionary Developmental Biology (2019)
- Biennial Award from the European Society for Developmental Biology (2024)

== Selected publications ==
For full publications list, see Swarthmore College Works.

=== Articles ===
A select number of his works are freely available online.

=== Books ===
- Gilbert, Scott F. (1st ed. 1985; 13th ed. 2023). Developmental Biology. Sunderland, MA: Sinauer Associates. ISBN 0878932461, 9780197574591.
- Gilbert, Scott F., ed. (1991). Conceptual History of Modern Embryology. New York, NY: Plenum. ISBN 0306438429.
- Gilbert, Scott F.; Raunio, Anne M., eds. (1997). Embryology: Constructing The Organism. Sunderland, MA: Sinauer Associates. ISBN 0878932372.
- Gilbert, Scott F., Tyler, Anna L., & Zackin, Emily J. (2005). Bioethics and the New Embryology: Springboards for Debate. Sunderland, MA: Sinauer Associates. ISBN 0716773457.
- Gilbert, Scott F. & Epel, David (2009). Ecological Developmental Biology: Integrating Epigenetics, Medicine, and Evolution. Sunderland, MA: Sinauer Associates. ISBN 9780878932993.
- Gilbert, Scott F. & Epel, David (2015). Ecological Developmental Biology: The Environmental Regulation of Development, Health, and Evolution. Sunderland, MA: Sinauer Associates. ISBN 9781605353449.
- Gilbert, S. F. and Pinto-Correia, C. (2017). Fear, Wonder, and Science in the New Age of Reproductive Biotechnology. Columbia University Press, NY. ISBN 9780231544580
- Lala, K., Uller, T., Feiner, N., Feldman, M., Gilbert, S.F. (2024). Evolution Evolving: The Developmental Origins of Adaptation and Biodiversity. Princeton University Press, Princeton. ISBN 9780691262413
