= Mark Mattson =

American neuroscientist

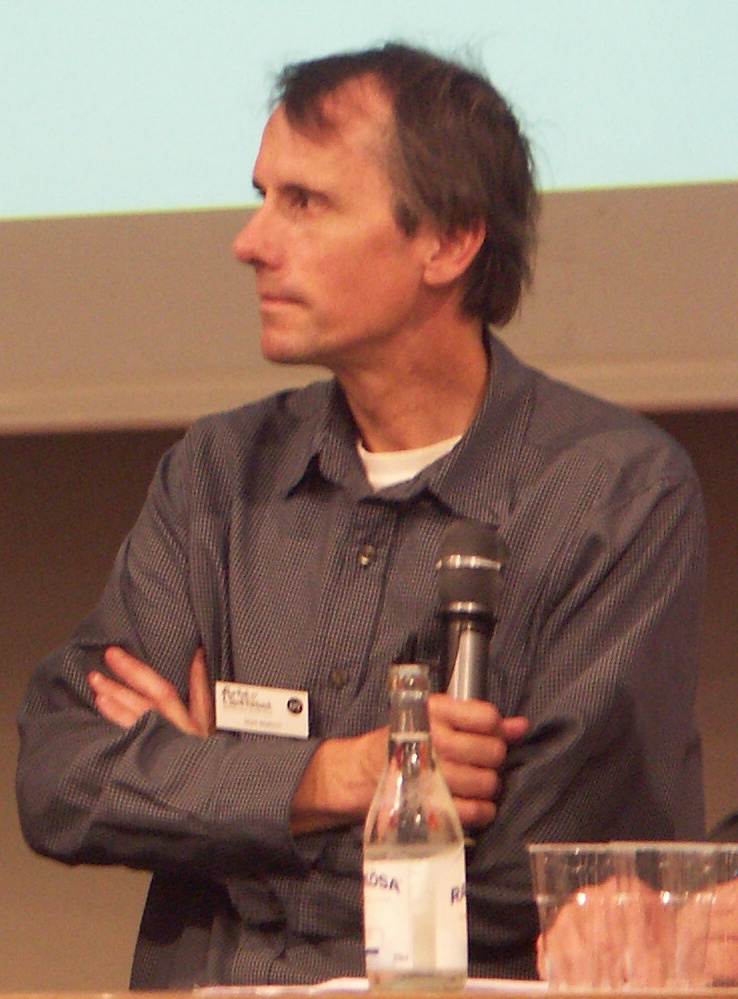
- Mark Mattson in 2009
- Education: Iowa State University; University of North Texas (Originally N. Texas State University); University of Iowa; Colorado State University
- Scientific career
- Workplaces: Johns Hopkins University School of Medicine

Mark P. Mattson is an American neuroscientist who is an adjunct professor of neuroscience at the Johns Hopkins School of Medicine.

== Early life and education ==
Mattson received his B.S. in Zoology from Iowa State University in 1979, his M.S. in Biology at University of North Texas (originally North Texas State University) in 1982, and his Ph.D. in Biology at the University of Iowa in 1986. He was then a postdoctoral fellow at Colorado State University.

== Career ==
Mattson is the former chief of the Laboratory of Neurosciences at the National Institute on Aging Intramural Research Program of the National Institute on Aging.

Mattson has done research on intermittent fasting. The National Institute of Health considers him "one of the world’s top experts on the potential cognitive and physical health benefits of intermittent fasting". He is author of the book The Intermittent Fasting Revolution: The Science of Optimizing Health and Enhancing Performance. Mattson's research has also elucidated roles for the neurotransmitter glutamate in neuroplasticity and Alzheimer's disease. He is the author of the book Sculptor and Destroyer: Tales of Glutamate - the Brain's Most Important Neurotransmitter. He also hosts a podcast called Brain Ponderings, on which he interviews prominent neuroscientists about their life and work.

=== 5:2 diet ===
The 5:2 diet, a form of intermittent fasting, was first documented in a 2011 article co-authored by Michelle Harvie, Mattson, and 14 additional scientists. The 5:2 does not follow a particular food pattern, but instead focuses entirely on calorie content. In other words, two days of the week are devoted to consumption of approximately 500 to 600 calories, or about 25% of regular daily caloric intake, with normal calorie intake during the other five days of the week. The diet was later popularized in the UK and Australia by Michael Mosley though the 2012 BBC documentary Eat, Fast and Live Longer (in which he learned about the 5:2 diet from Mattson who also appeared in the documentary). It also became common in Australia.

== Awards and recognition ==
Mattson was elected a Fellow of the American Association for the Advancement of Science for research revealing the cellular mechanisms involved in neural plasticity — the ability of neurons to adapt during processes like learning or injury — and development of neurodegenerative disorders. He is the recipient of the Alzheimer's Association Zenith Award, the Metropolitan Life Foundation Medical Research Award, and the Santiago Grisolia Chair Prize. He was as the founding editor and editor-in-chief of NeuroMolecular Medicine and Ageing Research Reviews.

On June 3, 2019, the international symposium Pathways towards and away from Brain Health was held to honor him on his retirement from the NIH.

== Selected publications ==
=== Book ===
- Mattson, Mark (2022). The Intermittent Fasting Revolution: The Science of Optimizing Health and Enhancing Performance. MIT Press. ISBN 978-0262046404.

=== Selected journal articles ===
- Furukawa K, Barger SW, Blalock E, Mattson MP (1996). "Activation of K+ channels and suppression of neuronal activity by secreted β-amyloid precursor protein". Nature. 379 (6560): 74–8. Bibcode:1996Natur.379...74F. doi:10.1038/379074a0. PMID 8538744. S2CID 25513373.
- Mattson MP (August 2004). "Pathways towards and away from Alzheimer's disease". Nature. 430 (7000): 631–9. Bibcode:2004Natur.430..631M. doi:10.1038/nature02621. PMC 3091392. PMID 15295589.
- Stranahan AM, Mattson MP (2012). "Recruiting adaptive cellular stress responses for successful brain aging". Nat Rev Neurosci. 13 (3): 209–16. doi:10.1038/nrn3151. PMC 4084510. PMID 22251954.
- Cheng A, Yang Y, Zhou Y, Maharana C, Lu D, Peng W, Liu Y, Wan R, Marosi K, Misiak M, Bohr VA, Mattson MP (January 2016). "Mitochondrial SIRT3 mediates adaptive responses of neurons to exercise, and metabolic and excitatory challenges". Cell Metab. 23 (1): 128–42. doi:10.1016/j.cmet.2015.10.013. PMC 5141613. PMID 26698917.
- Mattson MP, Moehl K, Ghena N, Schmaedick M, Cheng AE (February 2018). "Intermittent metabolic switching, neuroplasticity and brain health". Nat Rev Neurosci. 19 (2): 63–80. doi:10.1038/nrn.2017.156. PMC 5913738. PMID 29321682.
- de Cabo RE, Mattson MP (December 26, 2019). "Effects of intermittent fasting on health, aging, and disease". N Engl J Med. 381 (26): 2541–51. doi:10.1056/NEJMra1905136. PMID 31881139. S2CID 209498984.
