= Sinai Armenian inscriptions =

Armenian inscriptions of Sinai
- Writing: Armenian script
- Created: 7th-8th century
- Present location: Sinai Peninsula
- Language: Classical Armenian

The Armenian inscriptions of Sinai (Armenian: Հայկական արձանագրություններ Սինայիից) refer to nearly 110 ancient Armenian inscriptions that were found in the Sinai Peninsula. The Armenian inscriptions found in Sinai indicate an earlier pilgrimage before 919 and after the Islamic conquest. The outcome of searches concluded that 113 inscriptions in the Armenian language were found in the Sinai peninsula, and 20 in the Georgian language. The inscriptions dating back to the 5th century provide evidence of Armenians traveling to the holy land in large numbers, the second largest people to visit. One source mentions nearly 400 people, and another with around 800 people. The inscriptions give evidence of Armenians being among the pilgrims to Mount Sinai.

According to Michael E. Stone, "The number and spread of the Armenian inscriptions are surprising. The Armenians at least as far as can be told from their graffiti writing propensities seem to have been one of the most active groups of Christian pilgrims to the Sinai. What is striking, however is not merely the quantity but also the age of the inscriptions."

== Sources ==
- Michael E. Stone, Sinai Armenian Inscriptions, The American Schools of Oriental Research
