= Melanoblast =

Precursor cell of a melanocyte

A melanoblast is a precursor cell of a melanocyte. These cells migrate from the trunk neural crest cells (in terms of axial level from neck to posterior end) dorsolaterally between the ectoderm and dorsal surface of the somites.

== See also ==
- Biological pigment
- List of human cell types derived from the germ layers
