= Jonas C. Greenfield =

American scholar of Semitic languages (1926–1995)

Jonas Carl Greenfield
- יונס קרל גרינפלאד
- Born: October 20, 1926; New York City
- Died: March 13, 1995 (aged 68); Jerusalem
- Occupation: scholar of Semitic languages

Academic background
- Education: Yale University
- Thesis: The Lexical Status of Mishnaic Hebrew (1956)

Academic work
- Discipline: Ancient linguistics
- Sub-discipline: Semitic languages
- Institutions: Brandeis University; University of California, Los Angeles; University of California, Berkeley; Hebrew University of Jerusalem

Jonas Carl Greenfield (Hebrew: חיים יונה גרינפלד; October 20, 1926 in New York City – March 13, 1995 in Jerusalem) was an American scholar of Semitic languages, who published in the fields of Semitic epigraphy, Aramaic studies, and Qumran studies, and a distinguished member of the Israel Academy of Sciences and Humanities.

== Education and career ==
Greenfield studied at Yale University, receiving a Master of Arts in 1951 and his doctorate in 1956 (with a dissertation on "The Lexical Status of Mishnaic Hebrew"). He taught at Brandeis University (1954–56), University of California, Los Angeles (1956–1965), the University of California, Berkeley (1965–71), and the Hebrew University of Jerusalem (1971–1995). In 1990 he became Caspar Levias Professor of Ancient Semitic Languages at the Hebrew University.

He was a member of the committee of translators of the Ketuvim (the "Writings") for the New JPS Translation of the Tanakh.

In 1995 a festschrift was published in his honor, Solving Riddles and Untying Knots. Biblical, Epigraphic, and Semitic Studies in Honor of Jonas C. Greenfield. In 2000 the American Oriental Society established a prize to honor his memory, the "Jonas C. Greenfield Prize For Younger Semitists". The Orion Center for the Study of the Dead Sea Scrolls and Associated Literature, Hebrew University, Jerusalem, has held the Jonas C. Greenfield Scholars’ Seminar since 1999. Israel Exploration Journal 45 no. 2–3 (1995) 61–200 was issued as the "Jonas C. Greenfield Memorial Volume." Obituaries, in addition to the latter, pages 83–84, include Ziony Zevit, Bulletin of the American Schools of Oriental Research 298 (May 1995) 3–5 and Mark S. Smith, American Schools of Oriental Research Newsletter 45 no. 1 (Spring 1995) 1–2. For an appreciation of his work on Qumran and related texts see Baruch A. Levine, "The Contribution of Jonas Greenfield to the Study of Dead Sea Literature." Dead Sea Discoveries, Vol. 3, No. 1 (Mar. 1996), pp. 2–9

== Selected works ==
=== Books ===
- Greenfield, Jonas C.; Freedman, David Noel, eds. (1969). New Directions in Biblical Archaeology. Garden City, NY: Doubleday Anchor Books. ISBN 1-111-21308-9. OCLC 23032.
- ———; Greenberg, Moshe; Sarna, Nahum M., eds. (1980). Book of Job: a New Translation According to the Traditional Hebrew Text. Philadelphia: Jewish Publiscation Society. ISBN 978-0-827-60172-7.
- ———, ed. (1982). Corpus Inscriptionum Iranicarum. Pt.1. Vol.5. Texts 1, Inscriptions of ancient Iran. The Aramaic versions of the Achaemenian inscriptions, etc. The Bisitun inscription of Darius the Great: Aramaic version. London: Lund Humphries. ISBN 978-0-853-31458-5. OCLC 830850725.
- ———; Lewis, Naphtali; Yadin, Yigael, eds. (1989). The Documents From the Bar Kokhba Period in the Cave of Letters: Greek Papyri. Judean Desert Studies. Jerusalem: Israel Exploration Society : Hebrew University of Jerusalem : Shrine of the Book. ISBN 978-9-652-21009-8. OCLC 21262733.
- ———; Stone, Michael E.; Eshel, Esther, eds. (2004). The Aramaic Levi Document: Edition, Translation, Commentary. Studia in Veteris Testamenti Pseudepigrapha. Vol. 19. Leiden;Boston: Brill. ISBN 978-9-004-13785-1. OCLC 56066393.

=== Shorter writings ===
- ——— (2001). Paul, Shalom M.; Stone, Michael E.; Pinnick, Avital (eds.). 'Al Kanfei Yonah: Collected Studies of Jonas C. Greenfield on Semitic Philology. Leiden: Brill. ISBN 978-9-004-12170-6. OCLC 46505115. in 2 vols

Chapters and articles

- ——— (1992). "The Texts from Naḥal Ṣe'elim (Wadi Seiyal)". In Barerra, J. Trebolle; Montaner, L. Vegas (eds.). The Madrid Qumran Congress: Proceedings of the International Congress on the Dead Sea Scrolls. Madrid 18–21 March 1991. Vol. 2. Madrid; Leiden: Editorial Complutense; Brill.
- ——— (1995). "The Wisdom of Ahiqar". In Day, John; Gordon, Robert P.; Williamson, H. G. M. (eds.). Wisdom in Ancient Israel. Essays in Honour of J.A. Emerton. Cambridge: Cambridge University Press. pp. 43–54. ISBN 0-521-42013-X.

== Festschrift ==
- Zevit, Ziony; Gitin, Seymour; Sokoloff, Michael, eds. (1995). Solving Riddles and Untying Knots. Biblical, Epigraphic, and Semitic Studies in Honor of Jonas C. Greenfield. Winona Lake, IN: Eisenbrauns. ISBN 978-0-931-46493-5. OCLC 32392922.
