= Alan Rath =

American sculptor

Arecibo by Alan Rath, 1992, Honolulu Museum of Art

Alan Rath (1959–2020) was an American electronic, kinetic, and robotic sculptor. He was born in Cincinnati, Ohio and graduated from the Massachusetts Institute of Technology in 1982, with a BS electrical engineering. He worked for a Boston engineering firm after graduation, and in 1982, moved to Oakland, California to pursue his artistic interests.

Arecibo, in the collection of the Honolulu Museum of Art, is an example of how the artist combines electronics with an undeniable artistic talent to create witty statements about technology gone berserk. The Hara Museum of Contemporary Art (Tokyo), the Honolulu Museum of Art, the Los Angeles County Museum of Art, the San Francisco Museum of Modern Art, the Walker Art Gallery (Minneapolis), and the Whitney Museum of American Art (New York City) are among the public collections holding work by Rath.

== Fellowships and awards ==
- 1994 Guggenheim Fellowship, New York, NY
- 1993 Wallace Alexander Gerbode Foundation, San Francisco, CA
- 1988 National Endowment for the Arts, Washington, DC
- 1988 SECA Video Invitational Award, San Francisco Museum of Modern Art
