= Pseudo-Zeno =

Pseudo-Zeno is the conventional name for the anonymous sixth- or seventh-century Christian author of a philosophical treatise known only in an Armenian version. It survives in at least four late manuscripts, one of which attributes it to Zeno of Citium, the founder of Stoicism. This attribution was sometimes accepted and the work identified with Zeno's lost treatise On Nature. In fact, the work is untitled, anonymous and belongs mainly to the Aristotelian tradition. The style, however, is extremely obscure.

== Work ==
=== Title ===
The treatise is untitled in the manuscripts. Levon Khachikyan assigned it the provisional title On Nature (or Concerning Nature). One manuscript describes it as "of Zeno the Philosopher". Another introduces it with the words "another discourse". Both facilitated Khachikyan's naming. The latter manuscript also contains a work entitled On Nature by an unnamed rhetorician, suggesting that the work of Pseudo-Zeno may have been seen as another discourse on the same topic. Moreover, a lost work with the title On Nature is attributed to Zeno of Citium, and the attribution to Zeno the Philosopher may have come about because the work originally had the same title. M. E. Stone and M. E. Shirinian reject Khachikyan's title, preferring the purely descriptive Anonymous Philosophical Treatise. They also use Untitled Philosophical Treatise.

On Useful Kinds (or Concerning Useful Kinds) appears like a title in two manuscripts, but it is in fact the heading only of the first section.

=== Date and authorship ===
Only one manuscript attributes the anonymous philosophical treatise to an author, Zeno the Philosopher. The identification, however, is spurious. Although some 20th-century scholars believed the text was written by Zeno of Citium, the obvious influence of later texts and ideas has made this position untenable. Internal evidence also indicates that the author was a Christian. While explicitly Christian passages could be explained as Armenian interpolations, Stone and Shirinian argue that they are integral to the text.

Pseudo-Zeno wrote in the second half of the sixth century or perhaps early in the seventh. The Armenian translation was probably made in the seventh century. It did not circulate widely. The Greek text, if one ever existed, is lost and the Armenian manuscript tradition begins in the thirteenth century in connection with the monastic universities of Gladzor and Tatev.

=== Sources ===
Pseudo-Zeno's direct sources include the Bible, Dionysius Thrax, the Pseudo-Aristotelian Divisiones, Plato's Phaedo and Timaeus, Porphyry, Seneca the Younger's Naturales quaestiones, David the Invincible's Prolegomena and Elias's Prolegomena. The last two are the latest sources used and help date the text. Pseudo-Zeno directly references the ancient Pythagoreans. Other sources he may have used include the Pseudo-Aristotelian On the Universe, Epicurus's Epistula Pythoclem and Lucretius's De rerum natura. The works of Aristotle he also clearly knew, either directly or indirectly.

Aristotle is the primary influence. The influence of Neoplatonism is also clear.

=== Language ===
The modern editors of the text, Stone and Shirinian, consider the existing Armenian text to be a translation from Greek, largely on account of its vocabulary, which they associate with the Hellenizing School.

E. G. Schmidt and L. G. Westerink, however, argue that the text is probably an original composition in Armenian because of the exact verbal correspondence with certain quotations from the Armenian versions of Aristotle, David the Invincible and Dionysius Thrax.

=== Manuscripts ===
There are four (perhaps five) surviving manuscripts of Pseudo-Zeno. They are assigned the letters A, B, C and D and represent two distinct recensions. Only A is of the long recension, the rest (including the hypothetical fifth) belong to the short recension. The long recension is twice as long and has a different ordering of sections. The material in the long recension is mostly authentic, but the short recension is closer to the correct order.

All four manuscripts are kept in the Matenadaran. The oldest is A (Matenadaran M5254), copied by the scribe Geworg in the monastery of Deljut in 1280. B (Matenadaran M627) was copied by a scribe named Xačik in 1314. C (Matenadaran M3487) was copied by Jacob of Crimea in 1389. D (Matenadaran 1823) was copied in 1731 by a scribe named Mesrob in Etchmiadzin.

The New Dictionary of the Armenian Language published in Venice in 1836 contains words from Pseudo-Zeno cited to a "festal calendar", which suggests that a copy of Pseudo-Zeno existed in the same manuscript as a liturgical calendar in the Mechitarist library in Venice.

=== Structure and content ===
Pseudo-Zeno writes in a difficult style replete with technical terms. The Armenian author or translator has created new words for many of these, in keeping with the tendencies of the Hellenizing School. The meaning of the text is often obscure and knowledge of its sources is sometimes necessary to make any sense of it. It has been suggested that the work is in fact not finished, but is merely the notes (possibly from lectures) of a first draft.

The latter part of the work is structured around the four species of erudition: the practical, the reasonable, the theoretical and the comprehensible. These are further subdivided, the whole work being essentially about definitions and divisions.

== Bibliography ==
- Muradyan, Gohar (2017). "Medieval Greek–Armenian Literary Relations". In Zara Martirosova Torlone; Dana LaCourse Munteanu; Dorota Dutsch (eds.). A Handbook to Classical Reception in Eastern and Central Europe. Wiley-Blackwell. pp. 516–527.
- Schmidt, E. G. (1961). Die altarmenische "Zenon"-Schrift. Akademie-Verlag.
- Stone, M. E.; Shirinian, M. E., eds. (2000). Pseudo-Zeno: Anonymous Philosophical Treatise. Leiden: Brill. Translated with the collaboration of J. Mansfeld and D. T. Runia.
- Westerink, L. G. (1963). "Review of Schmidt 1961". Mnemosyne. 4th series. 16 (Fasc. 2): 195–197. JSTOR 4428800.
