= Dona Nelson =

American painter (born 1947)

- Born: 1947 (age 78–79); Grand Island, Nebraska, US
- Education: Whitney Museum Independent Study Program, Ohio State University
- Occupations: Painter, Academic teacher
- Organizations: Tyler School of Art
- Awards: Anonymous Was a Woman, Foundation for Contemporary Arts, Guggenheim Memorial Fellowship
- Website: donanelson.com

Dona Nelson (born 1947) is an American painter, best known for immersive, gestural, primarily abstract works employing unorthodox materials, processes and formats to disrupt conventional notions of painting and viewership. A 2014 New Yorker review observed, "Nelson gives notice that she will do anything, short of burning down her house to bully painting into freshly spluttering eloquence." Since 2002, long before it became a more common practice, Nelson has produced free-standing, double-sided paintings that create a more complex, conscious viewing experience. According to New York Times critic Roberta Smith, Nelson has dodged the burden of a "superficially consistent style," sustained by "an adventuresome emphasis on materials" and an athletic approach to process that builds on the work of Jackson Pollock. Writers in Art in America and Artforum credit her experimentation with influencing a younger generation of painters exploring unconventional techniques with renewed interest. Discussing one of Nelson's visceral, process-driven works, curator Klaus Kertess wrote, the paint-soaked "muslin is at once the tool, the medium, and the made."

Dona Nelson, Coins in a Fountain (two-sided), Acrylic and acrylic mediums on canvas, 79.5" x 79.5", 2015. Front (left), back (right).

Nelson has had solo exhibitions at the Weatherspoon Art Museum and Tang Museum (survey, 2018), and appeared in group shows at the Aldrich Contemporary Art Museum, Rose Art Museum, Mary Boone Gallery and Marlborough Fine Art. Her two-sided paintings featured in the 2014 Whitney Biennial were widely recognized and deemed some of the show's "most swooned-over works" by Art in America. Nelson has been awarded a Guggenheim Fellowship (1994) and her work sits in numerous public collections, including The Metropolitan Museum of Art, Solomon R. Guggenheim Museum and Boston Museum of Fine Arts. She lives in Lansdale, Pennsylvania, and is a professor of painting and drawing at the Tyler School of Art at Temple University, where she has taught since 1991.

== Life and career ==
Nelson was born in 1947 in Grand Island, Nebraska and attended Ohio State University. In the fall of 1967, she moved to New York City to participate in the newly-formed Whitney Museum Independent Study Program. After returning to Ohio to complete her BFA in 1968, she moved to Lower Manhattan, renting a loft in what is now SoHo; five years later, she would move to another in the future Tribeca neighborhood. By 1971, she was featured in prominent shows such as "Twenty Six Contemporary Women Artists" curated by Lucy Lippard at the Aldrich Museum, and "Ten Young Artists" at the Guggenheim Museum. Critics Grace Glueck and Hilton Kramer noted her work in New York Times reviews of the two shows, respectively. In 1974, the Whitney Museum included her in its "Continuing Abstraction in American Art" exhibition; her first solo show followed at the Rosa Esman Gallery on 57th Street, in 1975.

Dona Nelson, Daily News, Oil on canvas, 84" x 60", 1983. Collection of Metropolitan Museum of Art.

In the 1980s and 1990s, Nelson exhibited at museums, universities, and the Hamilton and Michael Klein galleries in New York. She moved to Philadelphia in 1996, to continue teaching at the Tyler School of Art. Nelson has continued to show actively in New York, at Cheim and Read and the Thomas Erben Gallery, which has represented her since 2006.

== Work ==
Although Nelson has created representational images, she has primarily worked in a fluid, abstract vein that writers suggest confront the traditions of Abstract Expressionism head-on and build on Joan Miró's anti-paintings, which used nontraditional materials and processes to disrupt painting conventions. Artforum likened her "exhilarating" willingness to take risks to that of Sigmar Polke. Critics especially note her "adventurously tough-minded approach to process," which "flirts with painting’s destruction" by rejecting the "conventionally ingratiating" in favor of dissonant techniques, surfaces, and colors. Noting Nelson's anarchic refusal to adhere to an easily identifiable style, writers have observed that her exhibitions can appear like compendiums of modern and contemporary painting thought.

Nelson regards herself as a process artist rather than an expressionist, emphasizing the primacy of chance, improvisation, and touch in her process. She employs diverse methods—pouring, staining, splattering, stitching, and more—working on unprimed canvas with a variety of paints, nontraditional materials, and at times, a painting's stretchers to create unexpected surfaces, textures, reliefs, and patterns (sometimes referencing the Modernist grid).

=== Early work: 1968–1990 ===
Nelson's early art explored geometric, grid-based abstraction through intuitive and systematic modes of pictorial construction; reviewers noted it for its grasp of style, subtle color, and affinities with art by Agnes Martin and Ellsworth Kelly. Considering this work developmental, she eventually destroyed it. In the 1980s, Nelson shifted to painterly representational work (e.g., Daily News, 1983) featuring ordinary interiors, landscapes and cityscapes, portrayed with an emotional realism and unfussy physicality. Figurative paintings, such as Summer Man (1983), offered centralized, life-size everyday subjects that The New York Times wrote, display a plain-spoken, "satisfying solidity" like those of Philip Guston; later works, such as California Landscape or the Man Who Needs Everything (1988), presaged future directions with glued, clothing-like pieces of muslin, saturated color, and increasing abstraction.

=== Mature work (1990–2002) ===
Many critics (and Nelson herself) consider her mature work to have begun after a long period of development, when she returned to abstraction in the 1990s. In this period, she regularly incorporated unconventional materials such as cheesecloth, muslin, gels, and modeling paste. She also began employing unorthodox techniques that combined control and accident to "disrupt" her paintings, such as pouring latex enamel paint over gridded fields (the "12 Stations of the Subway" series, 1997–8), making charcoal rubbings of highly textured, existing paintings (her ghostly "Rubbings," 2002), or adhering wadded, paint-soaked muslin to canvasses. Reviewers commented on the new work's collision of "formal order and procedural chaos," and raw and finished, which they found both dislocating and inviting, its power deriving from a "freeze-framing" of the painting process that revealed a series of discrete, nonlinear acts and decisions. Describing this passage in Nelson's work through the painting Octopus Blue (1990), Klaus Kertess wrote, "We are confronted by an organism wrestling with its self-formation—complex, mysterious, fierce, playful, sensual."

Dona Nelson, String Turn (two-sided, front shown), Acrylic, acrylic mediums, cheesecloth and string on canvas, 90" x 60", 2015.

=== Two-sided paintings and "Box" constructions (2002– ) ===
In 2002, Nelson began creating two-sided works one writer called a "nervy push" of "painterly painting into the realm of sculpture." Critics noted works like Gaucho Groucho (2005), String Turn (2015) and Coins in a Fountain (2015) for their increasing inventiveness and sense of performance, "adamant, difficult beauty" and "elaborate narratives of process," which included punching holes through the canvas and working back and forth between sides, staining through sides, removing and re-stretching canvasses, and more. David Pagel argues that this work "builds memory into the process, creating experiences that are greater than the sum of their parts – and far more mysterious." The New York Times wrote, "The paintings... demand that you deal with how they came to be that way… mysteries mount, resolve and mount again." Nelson explains that her exhibition constructions—using steel stands, platforms, bricks and cable—seek a more conscious, intimate viewing process countering the artificiality of typical, "big white box-style" contemporary art spaces, which privilege the reification of art over engagement and the complexity of surface.

Dona Nelson, "Models Stand Close to the Paintings" show (Installation view, "Box" constructions), Collage, dyed cheesecloth, muslin, and acrylic mediums on linen panel mounted on plywood base, 2017.

In 2016, Nelson returned to the figure in her two-sided, variously constructed "Box" works—free-standing, door-sized painted panels that verge on architecture and continue to employ unconventional materials and processes. Critics describe installations of the work, such as her 2017 show "Models Stand Close to the Paintings," as a "loose, kaleidoscopic maze of contrasting viewpoints" and interacting works—a sense furthered by the central, abstracted figures Nelson portrays in them. Critics such as Dan Cameron noted Nelson's disruption of the frontality of conventional painting, as well as the evolution of the physical presence of her two-sided works into a new, metaphorical level.

== Awards and collections ==
Nelson has been recognized with awards and grants from Anonymous Was a Woman (2015), Artist Legacy Foundation (2013), Foundation for Contemporary Arts (2011), Tesuque Foundation (peer nominated, 2000), and the John Simon Guggenheim Memorial Fellowship (1994). Her work resides in many public collections, including The Metropolitan Museum of Art, Solomon R. Guggenheim Museum, Boston Museum of Fine Arts, Art Gallery of New South Wales, Albright–Knox Art Gallery, Pennsylvania Academy of Fine Arts, Weatherspoon Art Museum, Rose Museum, among others, and several corporate collections.
