= Jeannette Ickovics =

American scientist

Jeannette R. Ickovics
- Citizenship: U.S.A.
- Occupations: Herman Professor of Social and Behavioral Sciences
- Spouse: Tyler Thorpe
- Awards: Strickland-Daniel Mentoring Award (2018), Master Lecturer on American Psychological Association Board of Scientific Affairs (2015), Fellow of the American Psychologial Association (2002), APA Award for Distinguished Early Career Contributions to Psychology in the Public Interest (2000)

Academic background
- Education: Muhlenberg College and George Washington University

Jeannette R. Ickovics is an American health and social psychologist. She is the inaugural Samuel and Liselotte Herman Professor of Social and Behavioral Sciences at the Yale School of Public Health and Professor of Psychology at Yale University.

Previously, Ickovics was Chair of Social and Behavioral Sciences at the Yale School of Public Health and the Founding Director of Community Alliance for Research and Engagement (CARE). She served as the Dean of Faculty at Yale-NUS College in Singapore from 2018 to 2021. Her research investigates the biomedical, behavioural, social and psychological factors that influence individual and community health. She has worked in the areas of maternal-child health, mental health, the health impacts of climate change, and multi-sector approaches to chronic disease prevention. She has also led a US National Institutes of Health training grant intended to advance prevention research, with a focus on HIV risk reduction.

Ickovics is the author of more than 200 peer-reviewed publications, and is the recipient of numerous awards, including the Strickland-Daniel Mentoring Award from the American Psychological Association. She is an elected Fellow of the Academy of Behavioral Medicine Research and the American Psychological Association.

== Research ==
Ickovics and her colleagues developed, implemented and evaluated the first standardized curricula for group prenatal care and published the first randomized controlled trials of CenteringPregnancy, now implemented in more than 500 clinical settings. This research has been cited as foundational for group prenatal care with special populations such as refugees, teens, military populations, and high-risk pregnant women, with particular impacts on reducing racial and health disparities. Further research has found that group prenatal care is associated with a lower prevalence of preterm birth, low birthweight, and neonatal intensive care utilization, along with higher levels of maternal mental health, breastfeeding, and optimal pregnancy weight gain and postpartum weight loss, among other factors.

Ickovics has also made substantial contributions to understanding the influence of the social and environmental factors that contribute to poor health outcomes. CARE (Community Alliance for Research and Engagement), cofounded by Ickovics, works directly with neighborhood residents to conduct collaborative interventions to improve community health. For example, in partnership with the New Haven Public Schools and the Rudd Center for Food Policy and Obesity, they conducted a randomized controlled trial documenting how school-based policies could reduce risk and improve outcomes related to obesity, chronic disease and academic achievement.
