= Michael E. Stone =

Armenian scholar

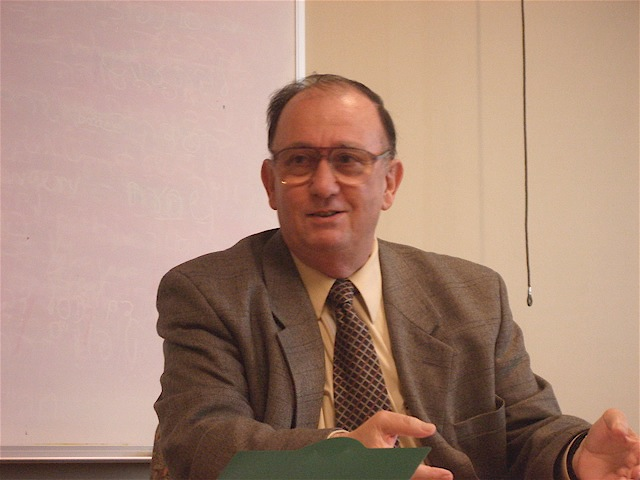
- Stone at the Hebrew University of Jerusalem, 2007
- Born: 22 October 1938 (age 87); Leeds, United Kingdom
- Citizenship: British, Australian, Israeli
- Education: North Sydney Boys High School
- Alma mater: University of Melbourne; Harvard University (PhD)
- Occupations: Professor emeritus (Armenian Studies), (comparative religion)
- Employer: Hebrew University of Jerusalem
- Known for: Armenian studies, Second Temple Period Studies
- Awards: Jack Kolligian Award for Outstanding Achievements and Contribution to Armenian Culture (1988); Lakritz Prize for Commentary on 4 Ezra, Institute of Jewish Studies, Hebrew University of Jerusalem (1991); Biblical Archaeology Society Prize for Biblical Figures Outside the Bible (with T. A. Bergren) (1999); Landau National Prize for Research in Science and the Humanities (Israel) (2002); Alice Tate Lecturer in Judaic Studies, University of North Carolina at Chapel Hill (2007); Cheun King Memorial Lecturer, Chinese University of Hong Kong (2009); Certificate of Distinction, Ministry of Diaspora, Armenia (2010)

Michael Edward Stone (born 22 October 1938) is a professor emeritus of Armenian Studies and of Comparative Religion at the Hebrew University of Jerusalem. His research deals with Armenian studies and with Jewish literature and thought of the Second Temple period. He is also a published poet.

== Biography ==
=== Early life and education, UK and Australia ===
Michael Stone was born in Leeds, England in 1938. In 1941 his family moved to Sydney, Australia, where he was raised. He attended North Sydney Boys High School where he studied Latin, Hebrew and Greek (First Class Honours). He earned a bachelor's degree from the University of Melbourne in Semitic Studies and the Classics during the years 1956–1960. His father, Julius Stone, was a professor of International Law at the University of Sydney and the first chairman of the Truman Institute at the Hebrew University.

=== Professional life in Israel, the US, etc. ===
He immigrated to Israel in 1960. After a year-long acclimation program at the Hebrew University (1960–61), Stone transferred to Harvard University in the United States and there completed a doctorate under Professor Frank M. Cross in the Department of Near Eastern Languages during the years 1961–65. His doctorate addressed the conception of eschatology in 4 Ezra. Afterwards he became a lecturer in Comparative Religion at the University of California, Santa Barbara. In 1966 he returned to Israel, became a lecturer in Comparative Religion at the Hebrew University of Jerusalem, and in the following year became an associate professor. In 1980 he became a full professor of Armenian Studies and was named as the Gail Levin de Nur Professor of Religious Studies. In 2007 he retired from the Hebrew University, where he continues his research and lecturing as a professor emeritus.

Stone held many visiting research and professorial positions at academic institutions worldwide. He was (according to chronology) assistant professor of religious studies at the University of California, Santa Barbara (1965–66), lecturer in Jewish studies and Armenian studies at the Hebrew University of Jerusalem (1966–69), senior lecturer in the same (1969–76), visiting research fellow at Harvard University (1971–72), George Scott Fellow at Ormond College of the University of Melbourne (summer of 1974), visiting member of the Theological Faculty at Leiden University (summer of 1975), associate professor at the Hebrew University (1976–80), the Berg Professor of Judaic Studies (1977–78) and the Tarzian Adjunct Professor of Armenian History and Culture at the University of Pennsylvania (1977–83), fellow-in-residence (1980–81) and visiting scholar (autumn of 1984) at the Netherlands Institute for Advanced Studies, distinguished visiting professor at the University of Pennsylvania (summer 1985), visiting scholar at the Netherlands Institute for Advanced Studies (summer of 1986), distinguished visiting fellow at Ormond College of the University of Melbourne (spring of 1988), visiting professor of Jewish studies at Harvard Divinity School (fall of 1989), visiting professor at Yale University (autumn of 1991), Distinguished NEH Visiting professor at the University of Richmond (spring 1993), visiting professor of religious studies at the University of Virginia (1993), fellow-in-residence and the director of a research group on translation techniques at the Netherlands Institute for Advanced Studies (1997–98), visiting professor of New Testament and Judaic studies at Harvard University (autumn of 2001), distinguished senior visiting fellow in the Kluge Center of the Library of Congress (autumn 2003), the Sugden Distinguished Visiting fellow at Queen's College of the University of Melbourne (summer of 2004), and distinguished visiting professor of Judaic studies at the University of North Carolina at Charlotte (2006–07).

He is a member of the editorial board of the journal, Revue des Études Arméniennes (Paris), served as a member of the scientific board of Patmabanasirakan Handes (Erevan) and as a member of the editorial board of Dead Sea Discoveries. He is a founder of the Society of Biblical Literature Pseudepigrapha Group (USA) and was a member of the steering committee.

=== Private life ===
He married Nira Weintraub in 1961. She was a scholar in the history of Byzantine and Armenian art, a field in which she taught for many years at the Hebrew University. They have two children and six grandchildren. Nira died on 26 June 2013.

=== Literary activity ===
Stone has written and published many poems in English, and he is a member of the Israel Association of Writers in English.

== Research ==
Stone is first and foremost a historian of religious thought. His research focuses on two fields: Jewish thought and literature of the Second Temple period including its transmission into the Middle Ages; and Armenian Studies. His work emphasizes texts and their interpretations but extends beyond a narrow textual focus to ideological analysis within religious and intellectual history.

== Armenian studies ==
Credited with "single-handedly pioneer[ing] the study of the Armenian language, literature and history", Stone's research has focused on several topics within this subject:

=== Jewish literature translated into Armenian ===
Stone has published several books dealing with Jewish literature translated to Armenian.

In his book, The Armenian Version of 4 Ezra, Stone published the first full critical edition of any text connected with the Armenian biblical canon. Following its publication, Stone produced several volumes of texts and exegesis addressing biblical or Jewish traditions. These volumes contain manuscript texts edited anew including the first editions of documents that were beforehand unknown. In this vein, many of Stone's articles are dedicated to the publication of texts, and in so doing he established a wide body of texts that were important both for Armenian and Pseudepigrapha Studies.

He published the first edition of the Armenian version of the Armenian Adam book, The Penitence of Adam in 1981. In so doing, he initiated long-term research on the deuterocanonical books dealing with Adam and Eve, which he collected over the past decade. He published concordances of Armenian deuterocanonical literature about Adam (1996, 2001) and additional literature related to Armenians and other Adam traditions (mentioned below).

=== Armenian deuterocanonical literature ===
With these publications Stone initiated a new field of study and research: deuterocanonical literature in Armenian, which is the transmission of biblical and Jewish traditions in Armenian. In so doing he had lasting influence on Armenian Studies as well as the study of deuterocanonical literature. In recent years he has focused on the way in which these traditions function within the Armenian culture and how their transformation reflects changes in the religious and intellectual history of the Armenian nation. He presents diachronic questions that were never before posed and traces shifts of religious, intellectual, and cultural history that were hardly addressed. These questions touch on understanding the human condition and existential purpose. Furthermore, the diachronic research of entire traditions highlights changes that occurred in Armenian thought throughout generations and ties them to Armenian history, politics, religion, and thought. Here he attends to ancient Jewish elements in Armenian culture.

=== Armenian paleography and history in Israel ===
Stone's interest in Armenian manuscripts led him to study the Armenian script. He published a number of technical descriptions of manuscripts and co-published with Dr. Nira Stone the Catalogue of the New Armenian Manuscripts in the Chester Beatty Library, Dublin. He edited and published Armenian graffiti from Sinai in a significant work of historical, epigraphic, and linguistic consequences. The inscriptions shed light on ancient Armenian pilgrimage, on the character of the pilgrims, and on their linguistic usages. His research tied into Armenian graffiti in Nazareth. He proved that a portion of the inscriptions in Sinai and Nazareth are the oldest Armenian script in the world and were inscribed within decades of the creation of the Armenian alphabet (early fifth century CE).

Stone published numerous Armenian inscriptions from the Land of Israel and made several significant discoveries regarding Armenian pilgrimage and monasticism in the Holy Land. He was the editor in chief of The Album of Armenian Paleography. He was joined by Dickran Kouymjian and Henning Lehmann. The album is a large project that exhibits and analyzes the development of the Armenian script beginning with the most ancient dated manuscripts and up until the nineteenth century. In the course of preparing this work he devised techniques for producing script tables directly from digital images of the manuscripts themselves. On one side of each opening there is a picture of the manuscript; on the other there is a copy of a segment of the text, paleographic discussion, and bibliography. At the end of the book appear development tables.

=== Jews in Armenia ===
With Israeli archeologist Dr. David Amit, Stone researched and published on a medieval Jewish cemetery of southern Armenia. This thirteenth-century cemetery is akin to no other – not only in terms of Armenia but of the oriental-Jewish communities. On the tombstones there are inscriptions in both Hebrew and Aramaic that teach about the life of the Jewish community in southern Armenia, about which there was no information previously. His research on the Jews of Armenia continues today.

=== Use of computer applications ===
Stone recognized very early on the potential of computer applications for Armenian studies. In 1971 he completed his first computer-aided research in Armenian. Since then he has used a computer application to compare manuscripts to produce scientific editions of texts as well as concordances. He wrote books in other fields of Armenian Studies; for example, the publication of his research with M.E. Shirinian dealing with the edition, translation, and exegesis of an ancient philosophical work preserved only in Armenian and with R.R. Ervine on patristics.

== Jewish thought and literature of the Second Temple Period ==
On this subject Stone dealt with a range of topics. Among the specific documents that he researched are 4 Ezra, the Aramaic Levi Document, the Testaments of the Twelve Patriarchs, Enoch and Noah literature, and literature relating to Adam and Eve. In the field of history of religious thought he has worked especially on apocalyptic literature and also on issues dealing with the central characteristics of Judaism of that period. He has also written monographs and articles on many other subjects in the field.

=== The Apocalypse of Ezra (4 Ezra) ===
This text was the subject of Stone's research for twenty-five years, the culmination of which was his exegesis of 4 Ezra, published in 1990. This work was written originally in Hebrew approximately thirty years after the destruction of the Second Temple and translated into Greek. From this Greek version it was translated into other languages: Latin, Ethiopic, Syriac, Arabic, Armenian, and Georgian. None of the Hebrew versions have been preserved and only fragments of the Greek, and for the vast majority of the text there remains to the present day only the translations from Greek, on which Stone worked. His book features detailed interpretation of the verses together with a wider analysis of the literary dynamic and religious worldview of the author as revealed in the text's content and presentation of topics. Over the years he wrote a series of articles on 4 Ezra, including the significance of structure, its notion of divine justice, as well as mystical and exegetical elements. These studies have been called "groundbreaking" by other researchers in the field.

Stone published two collections of articles on 4 Ezra and other dimensions of Second Temple Judaism. A prominent factor of his exegetical approach to ancient texts is the idea that descriptions of religious phenomena may represent actual experiences of the author or of the circle from which he/she came. This approach considers the religious experience of the author as a factor for researching ancient religious literature.

He also published the Armenian version separately (mentioned above) as well as his doctoral thesis on the text's eschatology (1989). In the course of his research he led the study of apocalyptic literature on topics relating to ancient religious thought.

=== The Testament of Levi and the Dead Sea Scrolls ===
Along with his research on 4 Ezra, Stone published the Armenian text of The Testament of Levi (1969). After many years of work, he published a critical Armenian edition of all twelve testaments of the sons of Jacob with the help of his former student, Dr. Vered Hillel (2012). Towards the end of the 1960s he commenced cooperation with Professor Jonas Greenfield regarding the Aramaic apocrypha, which continued until Greenfield's death in 1995. Together and separately, they published a series of articles that arose from their research, including some addressing the Enoch literature. Since then, Stone published their joint edition of the Dead Sea Scrolls fragments of The Testament of Levi in the DJD series. With Dr. Esther Eshel, Stone completed his and Greenfield's translation, exegesis, and research on this third- or second-century BCE work. The work survives in fragments transmitted in Jewish and Christian channels, including the Cairo Geniza, a Greek manuscript, and Dead Sea fragments. They arranged scattered segments and wrote exegeses.

The research on the Book of Enoch led Stone to become interested in the Dead Sea Scrolls. He wrote on the relationship between the Pseudepigrapha and Qumran literature, classification of the Jewish literature in the days of the Second Temple, and related topics.

With Esther Eshel he edited the 4Q464 manuscript, and with Esther Chazon a fragmentary work on the end times. Likewise, in his edition of fragments from the Testament of Naphtali, Stone showed that the fragment found at Qumran was included in altered form in the Greek Testament of Naphtali. Rabbi Moshe ha-Darshan, author of the Midrash Genesis Rabbati (France, eleventh century) knew of a similar or identical document to the Qumran one in a semitic language. From this the question of literary transmission from the days of the Second Temple to the Middle Ages arose acutely.

Stone founded the Orion Center for the Study of the Dead Sea Scrolls at the Hebrew University in 1995 and directed it during its early years.

=== The Books of Adam and Eve ===
Toward the end of the 1990s, Stone returned to a subject he discussed in his earliest articles: the Armenian apocryphal "Death of Adam".

After publication of his commentary on 4 Ezra he turned to the apocryphal literature of Adam and Eve. In 1992 he wrote, A History of the Literature of Adam and Eve, and in 1999 he published a book on the subject with Professor Gary Anderson. With Anderson, he also published a collection of studies on the Adam literature (2000) and books on other aspects of the Adam and Eve literature.

The book, Adam's Contract with Satan, deals with a tradition of Adam and Eve preserved in Slavic, Armenian, Georgian, modern Greek, and others. He followed the spread of this legend, which has it that after Adam and Eve left the Garden of Eden, they sinned a second time due to Satan deceiving them. That being the case, the post-lapsarian state of human beings in the world may be explained on two levels: 1—why we are not in the Garden of Eden based on the book of Genesis; 2—the fate of humans in the world is the outcome not of sin, but of deception (i.e., Satan deceived them). Subscribers to this perspective on the world see it differently than those that attribute it to the sin of Adam and Eve alone or to original sin, as in Western Christianity.

=== The history of Ancient Judaism ===
In this field Stone has delved into the character and phenomenology of Jewish apocryphal literature, a subject that occupied scholarship especially in the 1970s and 1980s. The conceptual innovations and insight contained in Stone's writing on Second Temple Judaism (such as the transition from oral to written literature, the sociological approach to understanding the wisdom teacher, and questions pertaining to the pseudepigrapha) left a lasting impression on modern perceptions of the primary sources. His work in this field is published mainly in articles. Stone's abilities and interests as a historian of religion are most prominent in this area of his research. His chief articles addressing these topics were gathered in two collections.

=== Current research ===
Today Stone pursues several research endeavors in the field: he has just completed a comprehensive investigation of Adam and Eve in the Armenian tradition (2013); he is preparing to publish many Armenian inscriptions from Jerusalem; and he is working on a book that will include previously unknown documents in Armenian about biblical figures.

== Research projects ==
=== Rock Inscriptions and Graffiti ===
Stone collected photographs of graffiti inscriptions in many languages in the Sinai, the Negev, and the Christian holy places. He himself published much of the Armenian material documented during the project.

=== The Orion Center for the Study of the Dead Sea Scrolls and Related Literature ===
In 1995, Stone founded the Orion Center for the Study of the Dead Sea Scrolls at the Hebrew University for the purpose of integrating new information from the scrolls with previous knowledge about Second Temple Judaism. Today, the center is one of the important research institutes on the Dead Sea Scrolls.

=== The International Association of Armenian Studies (Association Internationale des Études Arméniennes) ===
Stone founded the International Association of Armenian Studies (Association Internationale des Études Arméniennes) in 1980, held the office of president until 2000, and since then is the honorary president. Membership in the organization, limited to researchers in the field, numbers today more than 200. It is the leading organization for Armenian Studies.

=== The Jewish Cemetery in Armenia ===
With the Israeli archeologist Dr. David Amit, Stone oversaw the excavation of the Jewish cemetery in Armenia and the publishing of the inscriptions.

== Honorary memberships ==
- Foreign member of the Royal Netherlands Academy of Arts and Sciences, 1989, (Netherlands)
- Foreign member of the Istituto Lombardo Accademia di Scienze e Lettere (Italy)
- Honorary member of the Associazione "Padus-Araxes" (Venice)
- Expert member of the Armenian Philosophical Academy
- Founder and honorary Life President of the Association Internationale des Etudes Arméniennes
- Foreign member of the Ararat Academy of Sciences

== Prizes and awards ==
- 1988 – Jack Kolligian Award for Outstanding Achievements and Contributions to Armenian Culture
- 1991 – Lakritz Prize for Commentary on 4 Ezra, Institute of Jewish Studies, Hebrew University of Jerusalem
- 1999 – Biblical Archeology Society Prize for Biblical Figures Outside the Bible with T.A. Bergren
- 2002 – Landau National Prize for Research in Science and the Humanities (Israel)
- 2007 – Alice Tate Lecturer in Judaic Studies, University of North Carolina at Charlotte
- 2009 – Cheun King Memorial Lecturer, Chinese University of Hong Kong
- 2010 – Certificate of Distinction, Ministry of the Diaspora, Armenia

== Books and monographs ==
=== Published ===
- Editorial assistant. Smithsonian Institution, Scrolls from the Wilderness of the Dead Sea. Berkeley: University of California for ASOR, 1965.
- The Manuscript Library of the Armenian Patriarchate in Jerusalem. Jerusalem: St. James Press, 1969 (pamphlet).
- The Testament of Levi: A First Study of the Armenian Manuscripts of the Testaments of the Twelve Patriarchs in the Convent of St. James, Jerusalem. Jerusalem: St. James Press, 1969.
- Apocryphal Fragments from Qumran and the Church Fathers (with the assistance of E. Shefer). Jerusalem: Akademon, 1970 (Hebrew).
- The Books of the Life of Adam and Eve and IV Baruch. Jerusalem: Akademon, 1970.
- Concordance and Texts of Armenian IV Ezra. Oriental Notes and Studies 11. Jerusalem: Israel Oriental Society, 1971.
- The Testament of Abraham: The Greek Recensions. SBLTT Pseudepigrapha Series 5. Missoula: Scholars Press, 1972.
- Texts for the Understanding of Jewish and Pagan Religiosity in the Graeco-Roman Period (in cooperation with H. Attridge). Jerusalem: Akademon, 1973.
- The Armenian Version of the Testament of Joseph: Introduction, Critical Edition, and Translation. SBLTT Pseudepigrapha Series 6. Missoula: Scholars Press, 1975.
- Armenian and Biblical Studies. Supplement to Sion 1. Editor. Jerusalem: St. James Press, 1976.
- Armenian Inscriptions from Sinai: Intermediate Report with Notes on Georgian and Nabatean Inscriptions. Sydney: Maitland, 1979.
- The Armenian Version of IV Ezra. University of Pennsylvania Armenian Texts and Studies 1. Missoula: Scholars Press, 1979.
- Armenian Art Treasures of Jerusalem (with B. Narkis). Jerusalem: Masada, 1979.
- The Books of Elijah, Parts 1 and 2 (with J. Strugnell). SBLTT Pseudepigrapha Series 8. Missoula: Scholars Press, 1979.
- Armenische Kunst: die faszinierende Sammlung des Armenischen Patriarchats in Jerusalem (with B. Narkiss). Stuttgart: Belser, 1980.
- Scriptures, Sects and Visions: A Profile of Judaism from Ezra to the Jewish Revolts. Philadelphia: Fortress, 1980 and Oxford: Blackwell, 1982.
- The Penitence of Adam. CSCO 429-30 Scriptores Armeniaci 13–14. Leuven: Peeters, 1981.
- Signs of the Judgement, Onomastica Sacra, and the Generations from Adam. Editor. University of Pennsylvania Armenian Texts and Studies 3. Chico: Scholars Press, 1981.
- An Analytical Index of Armenian Apocrypha Relating to Patriarchs and Prophets. Jerusalem: Institute of Jewish Studies, 1982.
- Armenian Apocrypha Relating to Patriarchs and Prophets. Jerusalem: Israel Academy of Sciences and Humanities, 1982.
- The Armenian Inscriptions from the Sinai with Appendixes on the Georgian and Latin Inscriptions by M. van Esbroeck and W. Adler. Harvard Armenian Texts and Studies 6. Cambridge: Harvard University Press, 1982.
- Faith and Piety in Early Judaism (with G. W. E. Nickelsburg). Philadelphia: Fortress, 1983.
- Medieval Armenian Culture (with T. J. Samuelian). University of Pennsylvania Armenian Texts and Studies 6. Chico: Scholars Press, 1983.
- Jewish Writings of the Second Temple Period. CRINT 2.2. Editor. Assen: Van Gorcum and Philadelphia: Fortress, 1984.
- Banin Spasaworn: Essays in Honour of Archbishop Norayr Bogharian. Revue des Etudes Arméniennes 18 (1984). With S. P. Cowe.
- Features of the Eschatology of IV Ezra. HSS 35. Atlanta: Scholars Press, 1989.
- Emerging Judaism: Studies on the Fourth and Third Centuries B.C.E. (with D. Satran). Minneapolis: Fortress, 1989.
- Fourth Ezra: A Commentary on the Book of Fourth Ezra. Hermeneia Series. Minneapolis: Fortress, 1990.
- Textual Commentary on the Armenian Version of IV Ezra. SBLSCS 34. Atlanta: Scholars Press, 1990.
- Selected Studies in Pseudepigrapha and Apocrypha with Special Reference to the Armenian Tradition. SVTP 9. Leiden: Brill, 1991.
- A History of the Literature of Adam and Eve. SBLEJL 3. Atlanta: Scholars Press, 1992.
- The Rock Inscriptions and Graffiti Project: Catalogue of Inscriptions. 3 volumes. SBLRBS 28, 29, 31. Atlanta: Scholars Press, 1992–94.
- Text and Context: Studies in the Armenian New Testament. Papers Presented to the Conference on the Armenian New Testament, May 22–28, 1992 (with S. Ajamian). University of Pennsylvania Armenian Texts and Studies 13. Atlanta: Scholars Press, 1994.
- A Synopsis of the Books of Adam and Eve (with G. A. Anderson). SBLEJL 5. Atlanta: Scholars Press, 1994.
- Repertory of Printed Armenian Translations of Classical Works (with C. Zuckermann). Jerusalem: Institute of African and Asian Studies, The Hebrew University of Jerusalem, 1995 (booklet).
- Armenian Apocrypha Relating to Adam and Eve. SVTP 14. Leiden: Brill, 1996.
- Texts and Concordances of the Armenian Adam Literature. Volume 1. SBLEJL 12. Atlanta: Scholars Press, 1996.
- Biblical Figures Outside the Bible (with T. A. Bergren). Harrisburg: Trinity Press International, 1998.
- Biblical Perspectives: Early Use and Interpretation of the Bible in Light of the Dead Sea Scrolls. Proceedings of the First International Symposium of the Orion Center for the Study of the Dead Sea Scrolls and Associated Literature, 12–14 May 1996 (with E. G. Chazon). STDJ 28. Leiden: Brill, 1998.
- A Synopsis of the Books of Adam and Eve (with G. A. Anderson). 2d revised edition. SBLEJL 17. Atlanta: Scholars Press, 1999.
- Pseudepigraphic Perspectives: The Apocrypha and Pseudepigrapha in Light of the Dead Sea Scrolls. Proceedings of the Second International Symposium of the Orion Center for the Study of the Dead Sea Scrolls and Associated Literature, 12–14 January 1997 (with E. G. Chazon). STDJ 31. Leiden: Brill, 1999.
- Studies in the Books of Adam and Eve. Part 1 of Literature on Adam and Eve: Collected Essays. Eds. G. A. Anderson, M. E. Stone, and J. Tromp. SVTP 15. Leiden: Brill, 2000.
- The Armenian Texts of Epiphanius of Salamis De mensuris et ponderibus (with R. R. Ervine). CSCO 583. CSCO Subsidia 105. Leuven: Peeters, 2000.
- Pseudo-Zeno: Anonymous Philosophical Treatise (with M. E. Shirinian). Philosophia Antiqua 83. Leiden: Brill, 2000.
- The Apocryphal Ezekiel (with B. G. Wright and D. Satran, editors). SBLEJL 18. Atlanta: Society of Biblical Literature, 2000.
- A Concordance of the Armenian Apocryphal Adam Books. Hebrew University Armenian Studies 1. Leuven: Peeters, 2001.
- 'Al Kanfei Yonah: Collected Studies of Jonas C. Greenfield on Semitic Philology (with S. M. Paul and A. Pinnick). Leiden: Brill; Jerusalem: The Hebrew University Magnes Press, 2001.
- Adam's Contract with Satan: The Legend of the Cheirograph of Adam. Bloomington: Indiana University Press, 2002.
- Album of Armenian Paleography (Editor-in-Chief, with D. Kouymjian and H. Lehmann). Aarhus, Denmark: Aarhus University Press, 2002
- The Armenians in Jerusalem and the Holy Land (with R.R. Ervine and Nira Stone, editors). Hebrew University Armenian Studies 4. Leuven: Peeters, 2002.
- Armenian Paradigms (with G. E. Sterling). Leuven: Peeters, 2003.
- The Aramaic Levi Document (with E. Eshel and J. C. Greenfield). SVTP 19. Leiden-Boston, Brill, 2004.
- Album of Armenian Paleography (Editor-in-Chief, with D. Kouymjian and H. Lehmann). Etchmiadzin: Catholicossate of All Armenians, 2006. (Armenian)
- Apocrypha, Pseudepigrapha and Armenian Studies: Collected Papers, 2 vols. Leuven, Peeters, 2006.
- Adamgirk': The Adam Book of Arak'el of Siwnik'. Oxford: Oxford University Press, 2007.
- The Armenians: Art, Culture and Religion (with Nira Stone). Dublin: Chester Beatty Library, 2007.
- Early Judaism: Texts and Documents on Faith and Piety (with G.W.E. Nickelsburg). Minneapolis: Fortress Press, 2009. Revised edition.
- Noah and His Book(s) (with A. Amihai and V. Hillel). SBLEJL 28; Atlanta: SBL, 2010.
- Ancient Judaism: New Visions and Views. Grand Rapids, MI: Eerdmans, 2011.
- Armenian Apocrypha Relating to Abraham. SBLEJL, 37. Atlanta: SBL, 2012.
- Catalogue of the Additional Armenian Manuscripts in the Chester Beatty Library, Dublin (with Nira Stone). Hebrew University Armenian Studies, 12 and Chester Beatty Library. Leuven: Peeters, 2012.
- The Armenian Version of the Testaments of the Twelve Patriarchs: Edition, Apparatus, Translation and Commentary (with V. Hillel). Hebrew University Armenian Studies, 11. Leuven: Peeters, 2012.
- Adam and Eve in the Armenian Tradition, SBLEJL. Atlanta: Scholars Press, 2013.
- 4 Ezra and 2 Baruch: Translations, Introductions, and Notes (with Matthias Henze). Minneapolis: Fortress Press, 2013.
- Armenian Philology in the Modern Era (with V. Calzolari). Brill: Leiden and Boston, 2014.

=== In press ===
- The Armenian Holdings of the Chester Beatty Library: The Metal Covers and the Old Printings (with Nira Stone). Dublin: Chester Beatty Library.
- Apocrypha, Pseudepigrapha and Armenian Studies. Vol. 3 (OLA), Leuven: Peeters.
- ספר משיריו Michael E. Stone, Selected Poems פורסם ב-2010 על ידי Cyclamens and Swords Press.
- Adam and Eve in the Armenian Tradition, Society of Biblical Literature: Atlanta, 2013.
