= Nicolas Breer =

German politician (born 1992)

Member of the Landtag of Lower Saxony
- Incumbent
- Assumed office 11 December 2023
- Preceded by: Rashmi Grashorn

Personal details
- Born: 19 April 1992 (age 34)
- Party: Alliance 90/The Greens (since 2019)

Nicolas Mülbrecht Breer (born 19 April 1992) is a German politician serving as a member of the Landtag of Lower Saxony since 2023. He has been a city councillor of Haselünne and a district councillor of Emsland since 2021.
