= Carmen Clapp =

Mexican endocrinologist (born 1955)

- Born: 13 December 1955 (age 70); Mexico City, Mexico
- Occupation: Endocrinologist
- Awards: Guggenheim Fellowship (1994)

Academic background
- Education: Universidad Autónoma Metropolitana (BS); National Autonomous University of Mexico (MS and PhD)

Academic work
- Discipline: Endocrinology
- Institutions: National Autonomous University of Mexico

María del Carmen Clapp Jiménez Labora (born 13 December 1955) is a Mexican endocrinologist. She is a professor emerita at National Autonomous University of Mexico and a 1994 Guggenheim Fellow.

== Biography ==
Clapp was born on 13 December 1955 in Mexico City. She obtained a BS in Biology from the Universidad Autónoma Metropolitana in 1978, before obtaining an MS in 1983 and PhD in 1984 - both in physiology - from the National Autonomous University of Mexico (UNAM).

In 1984, Clapp became a research associate professor C at UNAM. She was promoted to research professor A in 1988, before becoming a research professor B at the UNAM Institute of Neurobiology (INB) in 1994. In 1993, she was a visiting scholar at INSERM U-344 at Necker–Enfants Malades Hospital. She was also a postdoctoral fellow at the University of California at Berkeley from 1985 to 1988, as well as a Rockefeller Foundation fellow at University of California, San Francisco from 1989 to 1994. In 2022, she was promoted to professor emerita at UNAM. She has also served as the INB's head of the Department of Cellular and Molecular Neurobiology at the INB.

As a scientist, Clapp studies endocrinology, particularly as it relates to vasoinhibins. In 1994, she was awarded a Guggenheim Fellowship "for a study of the endogenous nature of 16K prolactin as a potential inhibitor of angiogenesis and tumor growth". Roche México awarded her research project a 2006 Jorge Rosenkranz Medical Research Award. She and her team were awarded the 2008 Mexican Chamber of Pharmaceutical Laboratories (CANIFARMA) Award in Basic Research. She won a 2021 L'Oréal Mexico-UNESCO Award For Women in Science for her research project Análisis del potencial terapéutico de análogos de la vasoinhibina en modelos experimentales de cáncer, retinopatía diabética y artritis inflamatoria (lit. "Analysis of the therapeutic potential of vasoinhibin analogues in experimental models of cancer, diabetic retinopathy and inflammatory arthritis").
