= Sinauer Associates =

American textbook publisher

- Status: Active
- Founded: 1969; 57 years ago
- Founder: Andrew D. Sinauer
- Defunct: 2017; 9 years ago
- Country of origin: United States
- Headquarters location: Sunderland, Massachusetts
- Distribution: Worldwide
- Nonfiction topics: Science
- Owner: Oxford University Press
- Official website: sinauer.com

Sinauer Associates, Inc. is a publisher of college-level textbooks. It was started in 1969 by Andrew D. Sinauer and has since grown to be an internationally recognized publisher of seminal scientific works.

In 2017, the publisher continued as an imprint of Oxford University Press.
