= David Epel =

American developmental biologist (born 1937)

David Epel (born 1937) is an American developmental biologist. He is the Jane and Marshall Steel Jr. Professor Emeritus of Biological Sciences at Stanford University and a researcher at Hopkins Marine Station in Pacific Grove, California. His research has focused on egg activation during fertilization, the regulation of cell division, and ecological developmental biology, including embryonic responses to environmental stress. With Scott F. Gilbert, he co-authored Ecological Developmental Biology, considered the first textbook in that field.

== Education ==
Epel received a B.A. in biological sciences from Wayne State University in 1958 and a Ph.D. in biology from the University of California, Berkeley in 1963, working in the laboratory of Daniel Mazia. He completed postdoctoral training at the University of Pennsylvania School of Medicine in the Johnson Research Foundation laboratory of Britton Chance.

== Career ==
Epel joined Stanford University's Hopkins Marine Station as an assistant professor in 1965 and remained there until 1970, when he moved to the Scripps Institution of Oceanography at the University of California, San Diego as associate professor, becoming professor in 1973. During the Scripps period he spent a sabbatical year at Churchill College, Cambridge, as a Guggenheim Fellow and Overseas Fellow, in the University of Cambridge laboratory of John Gurdon. In 1977 he returned to Hopkins Marine Station, where he was the first holder of the Jane and Marshall Steel Jr. Chair in Marine Sciences and taught and conducted research until his retirement in 2009. He served as Acting Director of Hopkins Marine Station in the mid-1980s.

In addition to his Stanford appointments, Epel was on the faculty of the Gamete Physiology Course at the Marine Biological Laboratory (MBL) in Woods Hole in 1972 and co-directed the MBL Embryology Course from 1975 to 1977. He taught in UNESCO gamete physiology courses held in Sardinia and Sicily, served as resident professor for the Stanford Overseas Program at the University of Oxford in 2002, and was a faculty member in a NSF international polar biology course at McMurdo Station, Antarctica, in 1996.

== Research ==
=== Cell division ===
Epel's doctoral work identified problems with the experimental basis of the then-prevailing "Energy Reservoir Hypothesis," which held that energy metabolism regulated entry into cell division.

=== Fertilization ===
Searching for alternative regulators of the cell cycle, Epel began postdoctoral work with Britton Chance using sea urchin eggs and in situ fluorescence measurements of pyridine nucleotides. He found that a major redox change — phosphorylation of NAD to NADP and reduction to NADPH — occurs in the first minutes after fertilization rather than at cell-cycle transitions.

This finding redirected his research toward the events of fertilization and early development. His group described the activation at fertilization of a sodium-dependent amino acid transport system that operates at the low free amino acid concentrations of seawater.

With Robert Schimke and Andrew Muchmore, Epel isolated cortical granule contents and identified the first cortical granule enzyme, a β-1,3-glucanase. With Victor D. Vacquier, he later identified a trypsin-like protease released from cortical granules that contributes to the late block to polyspermy.

In collaboration with Richard Steinhardt, Epel showed that a rise in intracellular calcium activates the sea urchin egg. With Ryuzo Yanagimachi and Edward J. Carroll Jr., the work was extended across protostome and deuterostome phyla, indicating that calcium release is a general activator at fertilization. Subsequent work with Wai Yiu Cheung and colleagues showed that calcium acts via calmodulin to activate NAD kinase, accounting for the NAD-to-NADP conversion observed earlier.

With Miles Paul and James D. Johnson, Epel showed that fertilization triggers a Na+/H+ exchange that releases acid into seawater and produces an intracellular pH increase of about 0.5 units required for egg activation. Related work examined pH and calcium changes governing the sperm acrosome reaction and used electrically permeabilized eggs to measure changes in glucose-6-phosphate dehydrogenase activity in the pentose phosphate pathway after fertilization.

In 1973, with Ralph Gwatkin, Epel co-founded the Gordon Research Conference on Fertilization, which has met biennially since.

=== Ecological developmental biology ===
Beginning in the 1990s, Epel turned to how embryos cope with environmental stressors. He and Scott F. Gilbert co-authored Ecological Developmental Biology (Sinauer, 2009; Oxford University Press, 2nd ed. 2015), the first textbook in the field.

His group characterized multidrug efflux transporters expressed in eggs and embryos that expel environmental chemicals at low metabolic cost, and reported that symbiotic bacteria deposited around bobtail squid eggs by maternal accessory glands protect embryos from fungal fouling during development.

== Awards and honors ==
- Guggenheim Fellow (1976–77)
- Overseas Fellow, Churchill College, Cambridge (1976–77)
- Fellow, American Association for the Advancement of Science (1978)
- Allan V. Cox Medal for Fostering Excellence in Undergraduate Research, Stanford University (1995)
- Fellow, California Academy of Sciences (2000)
- Ed Ricketts Memorial Award for Lifetime Achievement in Marine Science, Monterey Bay National Marine Sanctuary (2006)
- M. Patricia Morse Award for Excellence and Innovation in Science Education, Society for Integrative and Comparative Biology (2020)

== Personal life ==
Epel was born and raised in Detroit, Michigan. He married Lois Ambush in 1960; they live in Carmel, California.

He has served on the boards of the Monterey Bay Aquarium and the Monterey Bay Aquarium Research Institute, and on the executive committee of the Sierra Club's Ventana Chapter. He was a member of the Hatton Canyon Coalition, which campaigned against a freeway routing through Hatton Canyon and contributed to its preservation as a state park.
