= Ziony Zevit =

American scholar of biblical literature

- Born: February 13, 1942 (age 84)
- Occupation: Biblical academic
- Title: Professor of Biblical Literature and Northwest Semitic Languages
- Awards: Guggenheim Fellowship for Humanities, US & Canada, 1994

Academic background
- Education: University of Southern California
- Alma mater: University of California, Berkeley (Ph.D.)
- Thesis: Studies in Biblical Poetry and Vocabulary in Their Northwestern Semitic Setting (1973)

Academic work
- Discipline: Biblical literature
- Sub-discipline: Northwest Semitic languages
- Institutions: American Jewish University
- Notable ideas: "Adam’s rib" was really his baculum

Ziony Zevit (born February 13, 1942) is an American scholar of biblical literature and Northwest Semitic languages, and a professor at the American Jewish University.

== Biography ==
Zevit received his B.A. degree from University of Southern CA in 1964, and Ph.D. degree from University of California, Berkeley in 1974. He joined the faculty of American Jewish University in 1974.

Zevit was awarded a Guggenheim Fellowship in 1994.

In an article published in 2001, Scott F. Gilbert and Zevit argue that the Bible might be interpreted that Eve was not made from Adam’s rib, but his baculum; which would explain why humans don't have one. Zevit's article published in Biblical Archaeology Review in 2015 presents the same theory and attracted certain public attention.

== Works ==
=== Books ===
- Zevit, Ziony (1968). The Structure and Individual Elements of Daniel 7. A. Töpelmann.
- ——— (1980). Matres Lectionis in Ancient Hebrew Epigraphs. Monograph series - American Schools of Oriental Research. Vol. 2. Sheffield: Sheffield Academic Press. ISBN 978-0-8975-7402-0.
- ———; Gitin, Seymour; Sokoloff, Michael, eds. (1995). Solving Riddles and Untying Knots: Biblical Epigraphic and Semitic Studies in honor of Jonas C. Greenfield. London: Eisenbrauns. ISBN 978-0-9314-6493-5.
- ——— (1998). The Anterior Construction in Classical Hebrew. Scholars Press. ISBN 978-0-7885-0443-3.
- ——— (2001). The Religions of Ancient Israel: A Synthesis of Parallactic Approaches. London: Continuum. ISBN 978-0-8264-4728-9.
- ———; Naude, Cynthia Miller, eds. (2012). Diachrony in Biblical Hebrew. London: Eisenbrauns. ISBN 978-1-5750-6253-2.
- ——— (2013). What Really Happened In the Garden of Eden?. New Haven, CT: Yale University Press. ISBN 978-0-3001-7869-2.

=== Lectures ===
- ——— (2010). Bible Stories How Narratives Work and What They Reveal. Washington, DC: Biblical Archaeology Society. ISBN 978-1-935335-50-4.

=== Articles ===
- ——— (1990). "Three Ways to Look at the Ten Plagues". Bible Review. 6 (3).
- ——— (2002). "Three Debates about Bible and Archaeology". Biblica. 83: 1–27.
- Gilbert, Scott F.; ——— (2001). "Congenital human baculum deficiency: the generative bone of Genesis 2:21–23". Am J Med Genet. 101 (3): 284–5. doi:10.1002/ajmg.1387. PMID 11424148.
- ——— (2015). "Was Eve Made from Adam's Rib—or His Baculum?". Biblical Archaeology Review. 41 (5).

=== Thesis ===
- ——— (1973). Studies in Biblical Poetry and Vocabulary in Their Northwestern Semitic Setting (Ph.D.). Berkeley, CA: University of California. ISBN 978-0-9314-6493-5.

== Literature about Ziony Zevit ==
- Greenspahn, Frederick E., and Gary A. Rendsburg, eds. Le-maʿan Ziony: Essays in Honor of Ziony Zevit. Wipf and Stock Publishers, 2017.
