= Yolanda Andrade (photographer) =

Mexican photographer

- Born: May 22, 1950 (age 76); Villahermosa, Tabasco, Mexico
- Occupations: Photographer; author; activist
- Website: https://yolandaandrade.viewbook.com/

Yolanda Andrade (born May 22, 1950, in Villahermosa, Tabasco) is a Mexican photographer.

== Early life ==
In 1968, Yolanda and her family moved to Mexico City, where she currently resides. Yolanda Andrade attended the Visual Studies Workshop in Rochester, New York from 1976 to 1977. She began working as a photographer since 1977. During these years she worked as a photography professor at the Centro de la Imagen, Tecnologico de Monterrey, and the Escuela de Fotografia Nacho Lopez. While living in Rochester, she received the Guggenheim fellowship to create a photographic project about Mexico City, which would later be known as the Mexican Passion. This same year she began working as a still photographer for a Mexican film production company. Later on, she worked as an independent photographer for different types of magazines. Since she started working freelance, there was a moment where she began teaching the art of still photography at different schools to help her financial with the various projects she was looking into.

The first couple of years as an independent photographer she spent her time specializing in black and white still photography. Then in 2003 she began exploring digital and color photography. The main focus of her work was to capture the relationship between the people and the city. Along with other grants that she earned, it helped her fund her collections among many different countries such as Mexico, United States, and Europe. With a shift in photography came a shift in the themes that she was capturing. Her black and white photos targeted more people while color photographs displayed more symbolic objects.

== Work ==
Andrade is most known for capturing what she describes as the "Mexican Passion", images that show the everyday life and culture of the people from Mexico: people mixing in celebration, tradition, and protest. For the majority of her time as a photographer, Andrade captured the "carnivalesque" world of Mexico City. She highlighted the cross between modernization, history, faith, and tradition which was the start of Mexico's culture. In her book titled Mexican Passion, some of the photographs being taken were of the hipster scene of the youth. She showcased the various protests that took place such as the LGBTQ parade in Mexico City to illustrate the modernization of the city that is moving towards a progressive era. The pictures taken do not show resistance, but rather pride and joy in each of the individual's faces.

Along with being a photographer, Yolanda is also an author of visual books showcasing her collection. She participates in various discussions and conferences about Latin American photography. She is a member of an art association called the Sistema Nacional de Creadores de Arte del FONCA (National System of Art Creators) whose aim is to showcase artists in order to express national identity and appreciation of Mexico. This is part of her activism work, in which she uses the photographs taken as a form of calling out the oppression done towards a group of people. Through her work, highlights how different groups of people come together as a united front but captured in a sense of celebration of identity.

=== Photography ===
Andrade began taking pictures in 1976 in the streets of Mexico. These photographs taken were primarily in black and white. Her photographs were mainly centered around the Mexican culture and street life. Her work could be described as poetically documentary at this point. During this time she tried integrating popular arts and urban culture, something that was emerging in Mexican media. A few of the photographs that she has taken can be found in the website "Ciudad de Mexico" . These images are photographs taken in black and white, where they make a stand in what is being experienced in the streets of Mexico. Since these images were taken in the streets of Mexico, people were her main art subjects.

In 2003, Andrade made the switch from black and white to color. She moved from using film to digital camera which she incorporated color to the photos she took. The change also came with a change in scenery. People were no longer her main focus of her photographs. Her work became more centered through composition and symbolism. Instead of only capturing photographs in Mexico City, she visited other countries as well. Some of these countries included Europe and India. This helped her obtain a new way of capturing the "youthful perspective", that is targeting a different audience in her works. In her photographs, she touches on the themes of cities, streets, pop culture, travel, and memory. She makes sure that her work targets representation and the real world and showing how everything around us can create a different way of experiencing our everyday interactions with the world. Her work is mainly targeting pop culture in the modern society of the city.

=== Exhibitions ===
The majority of Andrade's work is exhibited in Mexico, the United States, and Europe. She has more than twenty-five solo shows that display her photographs. Her work is exhibited in various locations. The locations are listed below.

Collection locations

- Visual Studies Workshop (Rochester, NY)
- California Museum of Photography (Riverside, CA)
- Museum of Fine Arts (Houston, TX)
- Southwestern and Mexican Photography Collection (Texas State University- San Marcos)
- Kiyosato Museum of Photographic Arts (Japan)
- National Institute of Fine Arts (Mexico, D.F)
- Guangdong Museum of Art (Guangzhou, China)
- Museum of Modern Art, INBA (Mexico City)
- J. Paul Getty Museum (Los Angeles, CA)
- Santa Barbara Museum of Art (Santa Barbara, CA)
- El Barrio Museum (New York, NY)
- Museum of Contemporary Photography (Chicago, IL)

=== Books ===
Black and White Photography:

- Los Velos Transparentes, Las Transparencias Velada (1988)

In this book, Andrade tried to capture the history taken of the streets of Mexico. These black and white photographs call on the culture that is found when roaming through the streets of Mexico City. The title means "transparent veils/ veiled transparencies" where some of the images captured are of religious statues that are covered up. She depicts this distinction with the people of Mexico of whose identity has been covered up and blended to meet up with societal standards.

- Pasión Mexicana = Mexican Passion (2002)

This book contains various images of Mexican life, culture, and traditions. It is one of the books that took her the longest to complete because it was a personal project of hers to capture the unique culture shown today.

- Melodrama Barroco(2007)

Color Photography:

- Fragmentos (2009)
- Parallel Visions (2009)
- Through the Glass (2009)
- A Mexican in Paris (2012)

This collection is exactly what its title is. Andrade photographed various people in the streets of Paris. This was to draw comparison that no matter where we are in the world, we are still the same people going through the same things.

- Las Vegas: Artificio y neón (2013)

This work captures the fireworks and neon lights that the city has to offer. She had no interest in mind to capture the casino life but rather focus on what this city had created for its visitors which was to offer and alternative world

== Grants ==
- Guggenheim Fellowship (1994), received for her photography project of Mexico City.
- Cultural Projects and Co-Investments Program of the FONCA (2000), received for the co-publication of the book Mexican Passion
- National Endowment for Culture and the Arts (1993, 1997, 2000, 2003)
