= Linda Levy Peck =

American historian

Linda Levy Peck (1941–2023) was an American academic historian specialising in the Jacobean court and political culture in the 17th century.

== Career ==
She gained a PhD at Yale University in 1973 and taught at Purdue University and the University of Rochester. She was Columbian Professor of History at George Washington University from 2000. Her papers are held at Purdue.

In 1994, she was awarded a Guggenheim Fellowship.

== Selected publications ==
- (ed.) with Adrianna E. Bakos, Women in exile in early modern Europe and the Americas (Manchester, 2024).
- Women of Fortune: Money, Marriage, and Murder in Early Modern England (Cambridge, 2018).
- Consuming Splendor: Society and Culture in Seventeenth-century England (Cambridge University Press, 2005).
- Court Patronage and Corruption in Early Stuart England (London: Routledge, 1993).
- (ed.) The Mental World of the Jacobean Court (Cambridge, 1991).
- Northampton: Patronage and Policy at the Court of James I (London: George Allen & Unwin, 1982).
- "Court Patronage and Government Policy: The Jacobean Dilemma", in Guy Fitch Lytle and Stephen Orgel, Patronage in the Renaissance (Princeton University Press, 1981).
