= Guto Lacaz =

- Born: Carlos Augusto Martins Lacaz; September 20, 1948 (age 77)

Carlos Augusto Martins Lacaz, known as Guto Lacaz, (São Paulo, September 20, 1948) is a Brazilian multimedia artist, illustrator, designer, draftsman and set designer.

== Biography ==
Lacaz graduated in architecture in 1974 from the Faculdade de Arquitetura e Urbanismo of São José dos Campos. His work is notable for urban interventions in cities such as São Paulo and Rotterdam. He has illustrated 17 books, with his work characterized by surprise and humor.

== Awards ==
- In 1978 he won the Unusual Object – Applied Art award – (Paço das Artes, São Paulo, SP)
- Nominated for the PIPA Prize in 2016
- In 2017 he won the APCA Award in the "Frontiers of Architecture" category
