= Trunk neural crest =

Details

Identifiers
- Latin: crista neuralis truncalis
- TE: neural crest_by_E5.15.1.0.3.0.1 E5.15.1.0.3.0.1

The trunk neural crest or truncal neural crest is one of the regions of neural crest in the embryo.

The trunk neural crest lies between the vagal and sacral neural crest and gives rise to two groups of cells. One group migrates dorsolateral and populates the skin, forming pigment cells and the other migrates ventrolateral through the anterior sclerotome to become the epinephrine-producing cells of the adrenal gland and the neurons of the sympathetic nervous system. Some cells remain in the sclerotome to form the dorsal root ganglia

Other Migration Locations:
- Proximal to the spinal cord and line up symmetrically to form the dorsal root ganglia.
- Into the skin to form melanocytes.
- Chromaffin cells of the adrenal medulla.
- Near the vertebral column and become sympathetic chain ganglia.

Differentiation involves BMP/noggin.
