= Emily Breer =

American filmmaker (born 1960)

- Born: August 1, 1960 (age 66); New York City, U.S.
- Education: Cooper Union (BFA)
- Occupation: Filmmaker
- Father: Robert Breer
- Awards: Guggenheim Fellowship (1994)

Emily Breer (born August 1, 1960) is an American filmmaker. A 1994 Guggenheim Fellow, she has made several award-winning films, including Fluke (1985), Spiral (1987), Brute Charm (1989) and Mona Luna (1990). She also co-created The Genius (1993) with Joe Gibbons.

== Biography ==
Emily Breer was born on August 1, 1960, in New York City, one of the four daughters of Robert Breer and Frances Foote Breer. She obtained her BFA from the Cooper Union in 1982.

Breer made her debut with the seven-minute film Fluke in 1985. She later made another short film, Spiral, in 1987. Fluke and Spiral earned Grand Prizes at the 1986 Black Maria Film Festival and the 1988 San Francisco Art Institute Film Festival, respectively, and both short films appeared on the WNET series Independent Focus. She was a signatory to the Open Letter criticizing the 1988-1989 Toronto International Experimental Film Congress over its support of older avant-garde film instead of its newer counterpart.

Breer's next films Brute Charm (1989) and Mona Luna (1990) earned the Best Experimental Film Award and an honourable mention at the 1990 and 1992 Ann Arbor Film Festivals, respectively. She collaborated with Joe Gibbons on her film The Genius (1993). Kathleen Cieckmann of The Village Voice described Breer's work as "combin[ing] animation, live footage, cacophonous domestic sounds, and goofy visual puns much like her father ... but with a tilted lyricism all her own." In 1994, she was awarded a Guggenheim Fellowship in filmmaking. She was a panelist for the 1995 Ann Arbor Film Festival.

Breer has also worked on commissioned advertising spots for media companies, including Comedy Central, PBS, and Sesame Workshop.

== Filmography ==
- Fluke (1985)
- Spiral (1987)
- Brute Charm (1989)
- Mona Luna (1990)
- The Genius (1993)
