= Ageing Research Reviews =

- Discipline: Ageing
- Language: English
- Edited by: Claudio Franceschi

Publication details
- History: 2002–present
- Publisher: Elsevier
- Frequency: 8/year
- Impact factor: 13.1 (2022)

Standard abbreviations
- ISO 4: Ageing Res. Rev.

Indexing
- ISSN: 1568-1637 (print); 1872-9649 (web)
- LCCN: 2002243184
- OCLC no.: 49560020

Links
- Journal homepage; Online access

Ageing Research Reviews is a peer-reviewed scientific journal publishing review articles covering research on ageing, aging-associated diseases, and human life expectancy. The editor-in-chief is Claudio Franceschi (University of Bologna).

== Abstracting and indexing ==
The journal is abstracted and indexed in:

- BIOSIS
- Chemical Abstracts
- Current Contents/Life Sciences
- Embase
- FRANCIS
- MEDLINE/PubMed
- PASCAL
- Scopus

According to the Journal Citation Reports, its 2022 impact factor is 13.1.
