= Gomidas Institute =

Armenian independent academic institution based in London, England

- Abbreviation: GI
- Formation: 1992
- Founded at: Ann Arbor, Michigan, United States
- Type: Academic
- Headquarters: London, United Kingdom
- Location(s): Cleveland, United States
- Executive Director: Ara Sarafian
- Website: www.gomidas.org

The Gomidas Institute (GI; Armenian: ԿԻ) is an independent academic institution "dedicated to modern Armenian and regional studies." Its activities include research, publications and educational programmes. It publishes documents, monographs, memoirs and other works on modern Armenian history and organizes lectures and conferences. The institute was founded in 1992 at the University of Michigan in Ann Arbor. It is based in London and maintains a United States branch in Cleveland. British-Armenian historian Ara Sarafian serves as its executive director. Since 1998, the institute has been publishing a quarterly journal titled Armenian Forum (ISSN 1091-4714 OCLC 35810656). The institute is named after Komitas (Gomidas in Western Armenian pronunciation).

== Selected publications ==
=== Ottoman/Turkish Armenia and the Armenian genocide ===
- A-Do (2017). Van 1915: The Great Events of Vasbouragan. Translated by Ara Sarafian. Introduction by Rouben Gasparyan and Rouben Sahakyan. London: Gomidas Institute. ISBN 978-1909382374.
- Bryce, James; Toynbee, Arnold (2005). The Treatment of Armenians in the Ottoman Empire, 1915-16: Documents Presented to Viscount Grey of Fallodon by Viscount Bryce, Uncensored Edition. Introduction by Ara Sarafian. London: Gomidas Institute. ISBN 978-1903656518.
- Carmont, Pascal (2012). The Amiras: Lords of Ottoman Armenia. Translated by Marika Blandin. Introduction by Bernard Dorin. London: Gomidas Institute. ISBN 978-1903656358.
- Cemal, Hasan (2015). 1915: The Armenian Genocide. Translated by Liz Erçevik Amado and Irazca Geray. Istanbul and London: Hrant Dink Foundation and the Gomidas Institute. ISBN 978-6056448881.
- Dink, Hrant (2014). Two Close Peoples, Two Distant Neighbours. Translated by Nazım Hikmet Richard Dikbaş. Istanbul and London: Hrant Dink Foundation and the Gomidas Institute. ISBN 978-6056448843.
- Einstein, Lewis (2014) [1918]. Inside Constantinople: A Diplomatist's Diary During the Dardanelles Expedition, April-September, 1915. Introduction by Ara Sarafian. London: Gomidas Institute. ISBN 978-1909382114.
- Horton, George (2008) [1926]. The Blight of Asia. Foreword by James W. Gerard. Introduction by James L. Marketos. London: Sterndale Classics (Gomidas Institute). ISBN 978-1903656792.
- Kaiser, Hilmar; Eskijian, Luther; Eskijian, Nancy (2002). At the Crossroads of Der Zor: Death, Survival, and Humanitarian Resistance in Aleppo, 1915–1917. London: Gomidas Institute. ISBN 978-1903656129.
- Jacobsen, Maria (2006). Diaries of a Danish Missionary: Harpoot, 1907-1919. Translated by Kristen Vind. Edited by Ara Sarafian. London: Gomidas Institute. ISBN 978-1903656075.
- Morgenthau, Henry (2016) [1918]. Ambassador Morgenthau's Story. Introduction by Ara Sarafian. London: Gomidas Institute. ISBN 978-1909382213.
- Morgenthau, Henry (2004). United States Diplomacy on the Bosphorus: The Diaries of Ambassador Morgenthau, 1913-1916. Compiled with an introduction by Ara Sarafian. London: Taderon Press (Gomidas Institute). ISBN 978-1903656402.
- Riggs, Henry H. (1996). Days of Tragedy in Armenia: Personal Experiences in Harpoot, 1915-1917. London: Gomidas Institute. ISBN 978-1884630019.
- Kirakossian, Arman (2004). British Diplomacy and the Armenian Question from the 1830s to 1914. London: Gomidas Institute. ISBN 978-1884630071.
- Sarafian, Ara; Avebury, Eric, eds. (2003). British Parliamentary Debates on the Armenian Genocide, 1915-1918. London: Gomidas Institute. ISBN 978-1903656112.
- Sarafian, Ara, ed. (2011). Talaat Pasha's Report on the Armenian Genocide. London: Gomidas Institute. ISBN 978-1903656617.
- Sarafian, Ara, ed. (2004). United States Official Records on the Armenian Genocide 1915-1917. London: Taderon Press (Gomidas Institute). ISBN 978-1903656396.
- Soulahian Kuyumjian, Rita (2010). Archeology of Madness: Komitas, Portrait of an Armenian Icon. London: Gomidas Institute. ISBN 978-1903656211.

=== Russian/Soviet/Post-Soviet Armenia and the Caucasus ===
- Carolla, Mario (2011). Vatican Diplomacy and the Armenian Question: The Holy See's Response to the Republic of Armenia, 1918-1922. Translated by Cynthia Quilici. London: Gomidas Institute. ISBN 978-1903656983.
- Chrysanthopoulos, Leonidas T. (2002). Caucasus Chronicles: Nation-Building and Diplomacy in Armenia, 1993–1994. London: Gomidas Institute. ISBN 978-1884630057.
- Evans, John Marshall (2016). Truth Held Hostage: America and the Armenian Genocide – What Then? What Now?. Foreword by Dickran Kouymjian. London: Gomidas Institute. ISBN 978-1909382268.
- Galstyan, Hambardzum (2013). Unmailed Letters. Translated by Agop J. Hacikyan. London: Gomidas Institute. ISBN 978-1909382015.
- Grigorian, Sassoon (2016). Smart Nation: A Blueprint for Modern Armenia. London: Gomidas Institute. ISBN 978-1909382343.
- Haxthausen, Baron August von (2016) [1854-55]. Transcaucasia and the Tribes of the Caucasus. Translated by John Edward Taylor. Introduction by Pietro A. Shakarian. Foreword by Dominic Lieven. London: Gomidas Institute. ISBN 978-1909382312.
- Parrot, Friedrich (2016) [1846]. Journey to Ararat. Translated by William Desborough Cooley. Introduction by Pietro A. Shakarian. London: Gomidas Institute. ISBN 978-1909382244.
- Raffi (2010). The Five Melikdoms of Karabagh (1600-1827). Translated by Ara Stepan Melkonian. London: Taderon Press (Gomidas Institute). ISBN 978-1-90-3656-57-0.
- Shougarian, Rouben (2017). Does Armenia Need a Foreign Policy?. London: Gomidas Institute. ISBN 978-1909382336.
- Yeghenian, Aghavnie Y. (2013) [1932]. The Red Flag at Ararat. Introduction by Pietro A. Shakarian. London: Sterndale Classics (Gomidas Institute). ISBN 978-1909382022.

=== Armenian literature ===
- Aghayan, Ghazaros S. (2010). Tork Angegh. Translated by Agop J. Hacikyan and Edward S. Franchuk. Illustrations by Talleen Hacikyan. London: Gomidas Institute. ISBN 978-1903656761.
- Bakunts, Aksel S. (2009). The Dark Valley: Short Stories. Translated by Nairi Hakhverdi. Introduction by Victoria Rowe. London: Taderon Press (Gomidas Institute). ISBN 978-1903656907.
- Raffi (2006). The Fool: Events from the Last Russo-Turkish War (1877-78). Translated by Donald Abcarian. London: Taderon Press (Gomidas Institute). ISBN 978-1903656587.
- Raffi (2008). The Golden Rooster. Translated by Donald Abcarian. London: Taderon Press (Gomidas Institute). ISBN 978-1903656778.
- Raffi (2006). Jalaleddin. Translated by Donald Abcarian. London: Taderon Press (Gomidas Institute). ISBN 978-1903656624.

=== Armenian art and architecture ===
- Mnatsakanian, Stepan K. (2010). Aghtamar: A Jewel of Medieval Armenian Architecture. Introduction by Ara Sarafian and Osman Köker. London: Gomidas Institute. ISBN 978-1903656990.

=== Kurds and Kurdistan ===
- Beşikçi, İsmail (2015). International Colony Kurdistan. London: Gomidas Institute. ISBN 978-1909382206.
- Geerdink, Fréderike (2015). The Boys Are Dead: The Roboski Massacre and the Kurdish Question in Turkey. London: Gomidas Institute. ISBN 978-1909382190.
- Kahraman, Ahmet (2007). Uprising, Suppression, Retribution: the Kurdish Struggle in Turkey in the Twentieth Century. Translated by Andrew Penny. London: Gomidas Institute. ISBN 978-1903656747.

== See also ==
- Armenian studies
