= Salpi =

Salpi may refer to:

== Geography ==
- Salapia, an ancient settlement in Daunia (present-day Apulia), Italy
  - Roman Catholic Diocese of Salpi

== People ==
- Salpy, also transliterated Salpi, a feminine Armenian given name
- Salpi Ghazarian, Armenian-American academic
- M. Salpi, pen-name of Aram Sahakian, Armenian writer and doctor
- Dimitris Salpingidis, Greek former professional football player

== Arts ==
- Salpi (novel), a novel by Armenian writer Raffi
