= Khachagoghi hishatakarane =

Novel by Raffi

Khach’agoghi hishatakaranë
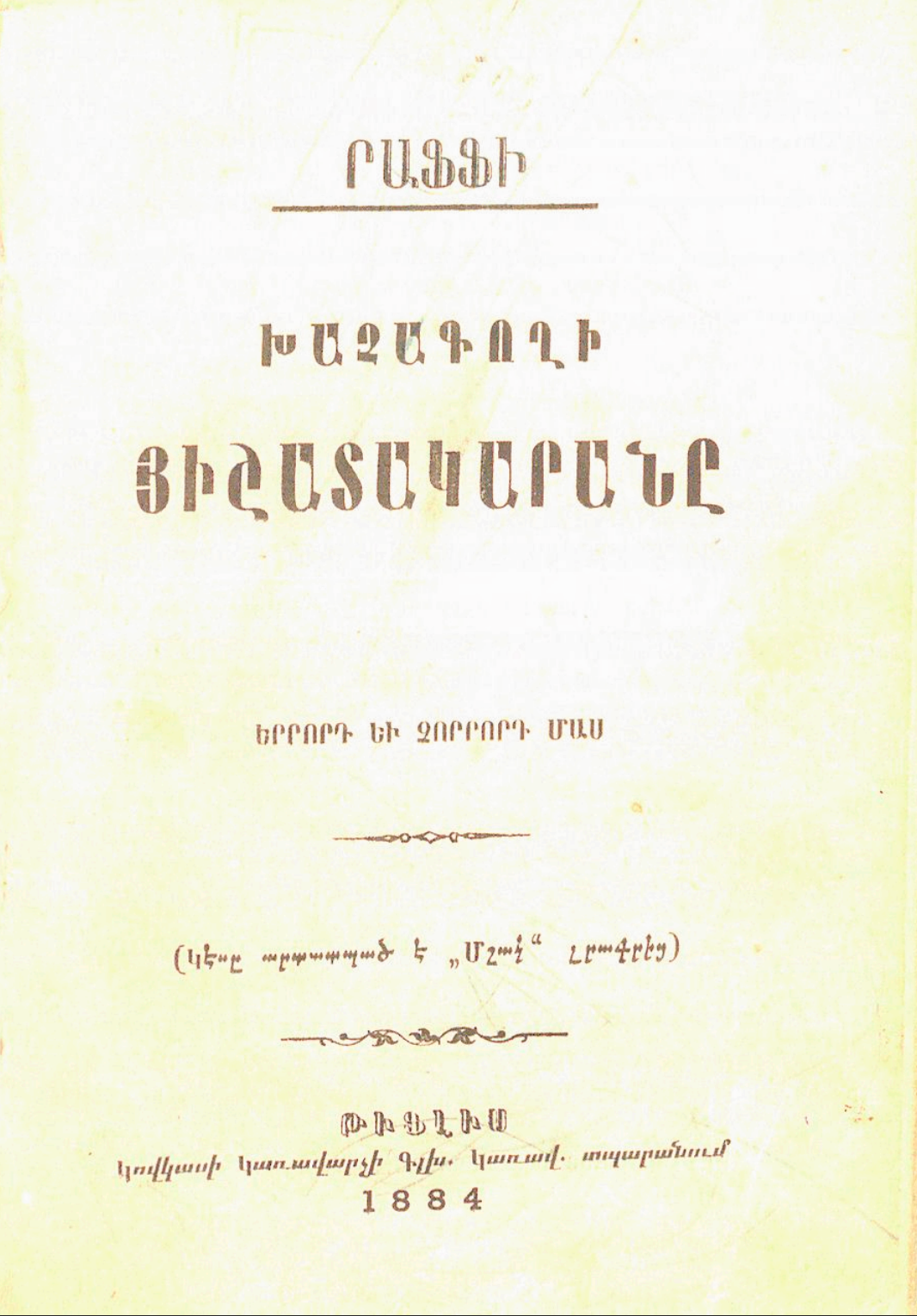
- Title page of the 1884 publication of parts three and four of the novel
- Author: Raffi
- Language: Armenian
- Genre: Novel
- Publication date: 1883–1884
- Publication place: Tiflis, Russian Empire
- Media type: Print
- Original text: Khach’agoghi hishatakaranë at Armenian Wikisource

Khach’agoghi hishatakaranë (Armenian: Խաչագողի հիշատակարանը, lit. 'Diary of a cross-stealer' or 'Diary of a robber') is a novel by the Armenian writer Raffi. It was serialized in the newspaper Mshak in 1882–83 and published in book form in 1883 (parts one and two) and 1884 (parts three and four).

== Background and publication ==
Raffi writes in his preface to the novel Khach’agoghi hishatakaranë (Armenian: Խաչագողի հիշատակարանը, lit. 'Diary of a cross-stealer' or 'Diary of a robber') that the main source material for the work is the actual diary of one such 'cross-stealer' (khach’agogh), as well as the stories he heard from the latter's wife in the village of Savra in Salmast in northwestern Iran (Raffi himself was a native of this region). The so-called 'cross-stealers' were Armenian men who traveled across the world making money by dishonest means. They came from the village of Savra and the villages in Russian Armenia where people from Savra had settled earlier in the nineteenth century. The term 'cross-stealer' (khach’agogh) refers to their practice of disguising themselves as priests or monks in order to steal valuable objects from churches.

Raffi's writing of the novel was preceded by many years of research about this class of itinerant Armenian con-men. He began collecting information on the subject in 1856 and began working on the novel in earnest in 1870. Besides the research he conducted himself in Salmast, he also relied on some ethnographic information in written works. He may have been inspired to write the work by Eugène Sue's novel The Wandering Jew. He wrote the novel in 1872–74, and it appears to have circulated in manuscript form among some circles in Tiflis. However, Raffi made significant revisions when the work was finally serialized in the newspaper Mshak in 1882–83. Raffi indicates in the preface that many acquaintances advised him not to publish the work, but that he did so anyway because he thought it was important to shed light on this negative social phenomenon.

Most of Khach’agoghi hishatakaranë was first published in serialized form in Mshak. Parts one and two of the work were also published as a separate edition in 1883. The serialization was interrupted when Raffi's house was searched by the police and he was placed under house arrest. The remainder of the novel was not serialized, and the ending was published only in the separate edition containing the third and fourth parts, published in 1884. The novel was also published in the Constantinople newspaper Arevelk’ in 1884. The four parts of the novel were published in a single volume for the first time in 1895 by Raffi's wife Anna (Raffi had died in 1888). It is one of Raffi's most frequently published works. It has been translated into Spanish as Las memorias del hurtacruz (Buenos Aires, 1949).

== Adaptations ==
In 1888, a few months after Raffi's death, Khach’agoghi hishatakaranë was adapted into a play and performed in Baku by a local troupe. It was adapted again in 1912 by actor Aram Vruyr and performed under the title Khach’agoghner (Cross-stealers), also in Baku. A third theatrical adaptation was made in 1915 by actor Hovhannes Zarifian, and was performed in Baku, Kars and elsewhere. Khach’agoghi hishatakaranë was adapted into an Armenian film of the same name in 2010, directed by Hrach Keshishyan to a script by Artak Arzumanyan and starring Samvel Topalyan as Murad, Hrachya Harutyunyan as Godfather Petros, and Nazeni Hovhannisyan as Nene.
