= Salpy =

Salpy or spelt as Salpi (Սալբի), is an Armenian female given name. The name also occurs in the variants Salva and Salui (Սալվի, Սալուի). The name possibly comes from the Turkish word selvi, meaning "cypress", and has been attested since the 17th century. The name is also the titular character of the novel Salpy (published 1911) by the Armenian novelist Raffi, and the pseudonym of the writer Salpi.
