= Armenian literature =

Armenian literature (Armenian: Հայ գրականություն, romanized: Hay grakanut'yun), produced in the Armenian language, has existed in written form since the 5th century CE, when the Armenian alphabet was invented by Mesrop Mashtots and the first original works of Armenian literature were composed. Prior to the establishment of the Armenian written language, Armenians used Greek or Aramaic for inscriptions, coinage, and correspondence; Syriac was also used within the Armenian Church. Additionally, a rich oral literature had long existed, fragments of which were documented from the 5th to the 8th centuries. The initial phase of its development witnessed the diversification of genres, with the 5th century recognized as its "Golden age."

The restoration of the Kingdom of Armenia in 885 held significant implications for literary endeavors. Following its decline in 1045, the Armenian state found renewed formation in Cilicia and Zakarid Armenia, emerging as a novel hub for literary advancements. From the 12th century onward, literature flourished not only in Classical Armenian but also in the Middle Armenian literary language. Throughout the High Middle Ages, literary pursuits extended to the diaspora. The 17th–18th centuries marked a period of resurgence across all Armenian literary genres.

In the 19th century, modern Armenian literature developed, with two main vernacular literary standards, Western and Eastern Armenian, replacing Classical Armenian as the main literary language.

== History ==
=== Reports on Pre-Mashtots literature and ancient Armenian folklore ===
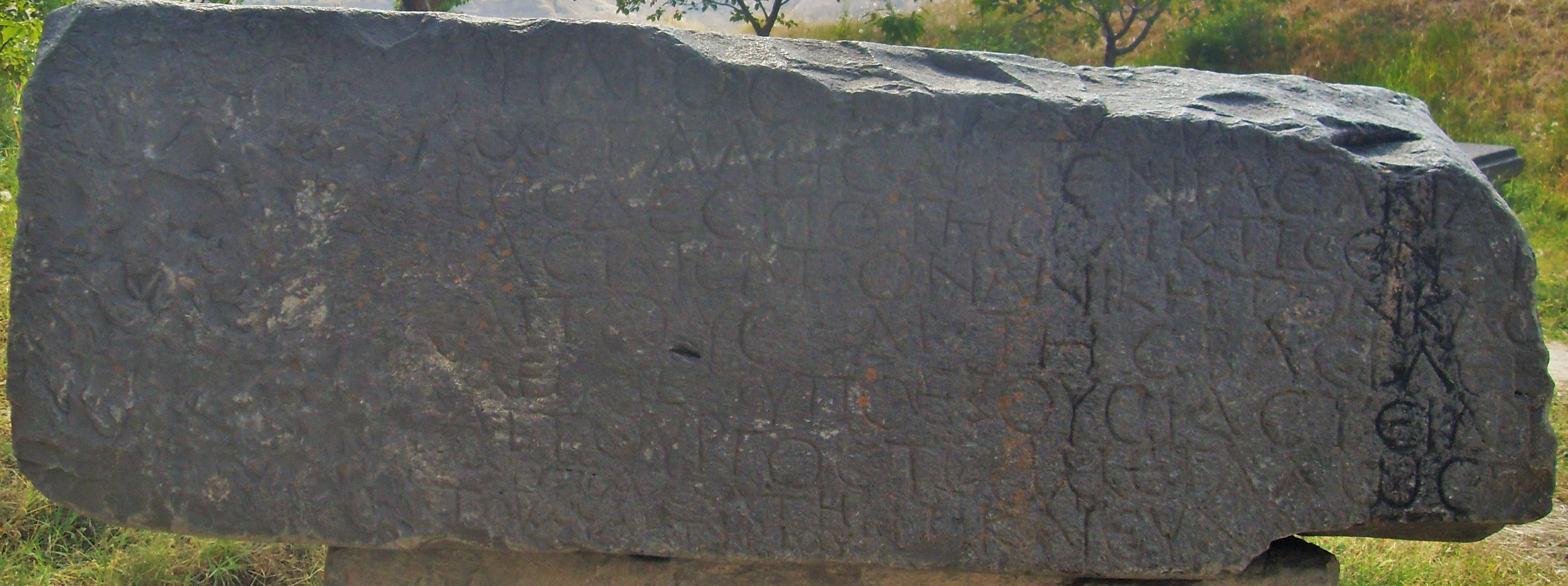
Greek inscription from Garni temple with the Armenian word ter — meaning "head of a clan, ruler of a region", 1st century AD

Several antique and ancient Armenian sources, both directly and indirectly, attest to the existence of Armenian script and literature predating the 5th century. Notable authors contributing to this historical narrative include Philo of Alexandria (1st century), Philostratus (2nd-3rd centuries), Hippolytus of Rome (2nd–3rd centuries), and others. The recognition of pre-Mashtots Armenian writing as a scholarly concept emerged as early as the 1830s.

Within the medieval Armenian context, discussions on pre-Christian writing persisted. In the late 13th century, Vardan Areveltsi explicitly acknowledged the existence of pre-Christian Armenian writings, citing evidence such as the discovery of a coin in Cilicia bearing the name of a pagan Haykazuni king in Armenian letters during the reign of King Levon.

Mikhail Diakonoff and O. Kudryavtsev proposed the notion that Armenians possessed specialized secret writings as early as the 3rd-1st centuries BCE, which were employed for composing temple books and chronicles. Supporting evidence includes the works of the priest Olumpus, whose temple stories were translated into Syriac by Bardaisan in the 2nd-3rd centuries. Nikolai Marr endorsed the idea of writing in the Armenian language several centuries BCE, a perspective that Valery Bryusov echoed regarding the first four centuries of the Common Era. However, this concept faced criticism from Hrachia Acharian.

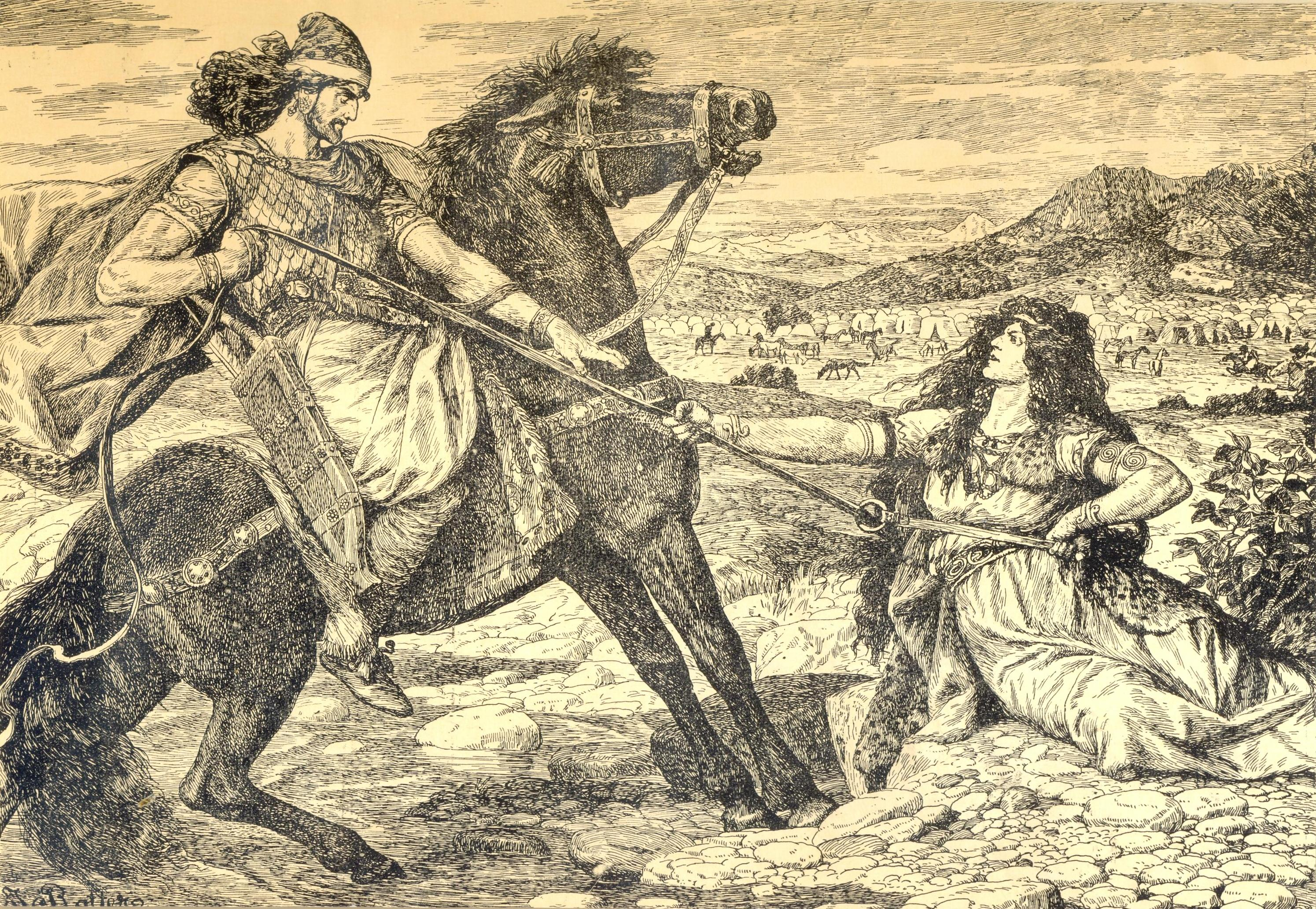
Artashes and Satenik, artist Josef Rotter

The rich oral literature of the Armenian people predates the establishment of the Armenian alphabet. The earliest Armenian writers drew upon a well-developed tradition of oral storytelling. Historians of the 5th-8th centuries preserved examples of early folklore. Among the most ancient preserved Armenian legends, tales and myths are Hayk, Aram, Ara the Beautiful, Tork Angeh, Artavazd, Vahagn, Tigran, Azhdahak, Yervand and Yervaz. The narrative "Tigran and Azhdahak", set in the 6th century BC, introduced the first female character. Mythologized historical stories emerged between the 7th and 2nd centuries BC. The preserved epic passage narrates the story of Artashes II, the King of Greater Armenia (2nd century BC), and his beloved Satenik. Some folklore tales reveal a Proto-Indo-European cultural layer, such as "The Birth of Vahagn", while others are linked to the Urartian past, as seen in medieval Armenian songs depicting the cult of the tree of life.

Despite the prevalence of oral traditions, the church during the Middle Ages opposed folk singers and storytellers, known as gusans or minstrels. Elizabeth Redgate noted that the church actively hindered the spread of pre-Christian oral traditions, viewing them as a challenge to its ideology.

Several Armenian epics from the Christian era have endured. The oldest, the "Persian War", recounts events between the 3rd and 5th centuries, documenting the struggle against the Sasanian Empire. Portions of this epic were recorded as early as the 5th century. "The War of Taron", documented in the 7th-8th centuries, narrates 5th-century events. The poetic epic "David of Sassoun," taking shape between the 7th and 10th centuries, expresses social and religious protest against Arab oppression while preserving echoes of the pre-Christian past, rooted in the common Indo-European origins of Armenian mythology. The narratives surrounding the ancient Armenian rulers Trdat III and Arshak II, alongside the stories of commanders Mushege and Vardan Mamikonyan during the fourth and fifth centuries, together encapsulate significant artistic, historical, and educational significance. Beyond being mere historical records, these legends act as cultural guiding lights, conveying not only aesthetic appeal and historical weight but also enduring moral lessons, making indispensable contributions to Armenia's rich heritage. Sentimental folklore creations date back to the 13th-14th centuries, with the first compilation of folk songs assembled in 1620.

=== Early literature ===
Only a handful of fragments have survived from the most ancient Armenian literary tradition preceding the Christianization of Armenia in the early 4th century, largely preserved by Movses Khorenatsi. The start of Christian Armenian literature dates to around the year 406 with the invention of the Armenian alphabet by Mesrop for the purpose of translating Biblical books into Armenian.

Isaac, the Catholicos of Armenia, formed a school of translators who were sent to Edessa, Athens, Constantinople, Alexandria, Antioch, Caesarea in Cappadocia, and elsewhere, to procure codices both in Syriac and Greek and translate them. From Syriac came the first version of the New Testament, the version of Eusebius' History and his Life of Constantine (unless this is from the original Greek), the homilies of Aphraates, the Acts of Gurias and Samuna, the works of Ephrem Syrus (partly published in four volumes by the Mechitharists of Venice). In these first years of the 5th century, some of the apocryphal works, like the Discourses attributed to St. Gregory and the History of Armenia said to have come from Agathangelus, are asserted to be the works of these and other well-known men. This early period of Armenian literature also produced many original compositions, including Eznik of Kolb's "Refutation of the Sects", Koryun's "Life of Mashtots", P'avstos Buzand's History of the Armenians and Ghazar Parpetsi's History of the Armenians. Eznik and Koryun were disciples of Mashtots.

The Golden Age also includes the Histories of Elishe and Movses Khorenatsi, although it has been suggested that the works of these authors may have been composed at a later date.

=== Medieval era ===
Armenia is known to have been a nation often occupied by nearby powers, such as the Sassanid Empire. The beginning of the medieval era was marked by the Arab conquest of Armenia. The people then started to talk of a great hero who would be able to liberate them and reestablish Armenian sovereignty. David of Sasun, known as Sasuntsi Davit', is the medieval Armenian equivalent of Hercules. For over a thousand years the Daredevils of Sassoun was passed from grandfathers to their grandsons thanks to the Armenian oral tradition, and it is difficult to classify his stories as ancient or medieval. In 1873, the story was first written down by Archbishop Garegin Srvandztiants, who copied word for word the tale as told by a peasant storyteller from Moush named Grbo. Other versions of the tale from various regions of Armenia were copied down in the ensuing years, and during the early Soviet Armenia, the stories were collated into a "unified version"; a narrative which connected dozens of isolated episodes, fragments, and near-complete though differing versions of the legend. One of the most famous treatments of the story was the verse rendition made by Hovhannes Toumanian in 1902. His poem only covers the story of David, which is actually only one of 4 parts of the story, although the central portion.

The four portions of the story are named after their heroes: Sanasar & Balthazar (Sanasar yev Baghdasar), Lion-Mher (Aryuts Mher), David of Sassoun (Sassountsi Davit), and Mher the Younger (Pokr Mher). Sanasar is the father of Lion-Mher, who is the father of David, who is the father of Mher the Younger. Mher the younger is cursed to never bear progeny and his superhuman powers are too much for the world to handle, so he is enclosed in a mountain cave where he waits until the end of the world to come out and restore order. (similar to the western legends of King Arthur or Barbarossa.)

Despite being Christian poetry, numerous fantastic creatures, good and evil, influence the action.

One of the ancestors of the legendary David is the Lady Dzovinar, who agrees to marry the 90-year-old Caliph of Baghdad in order to save her people. Sanasar and Balthasar were their two sons. Sanasar moves to Sassoun, the fortress-town of Armenia, now located in Turkey. He has three children, the eldest of them being the Great Mher of Sassoun, with superhuman powers. Mher's veritable son is David of Sassoun. However, he also gets another son from the Arabic queen of Egypt. He is known as Misra Melik, which literally means "The sovereign of Egypt". He is probably the figure of all of what the Armenians resented; traitors, and foreign oppressors.

Throughout the years the half-brothers fought, and eventually David chops his nemesis in half.

=== Religious literature ===
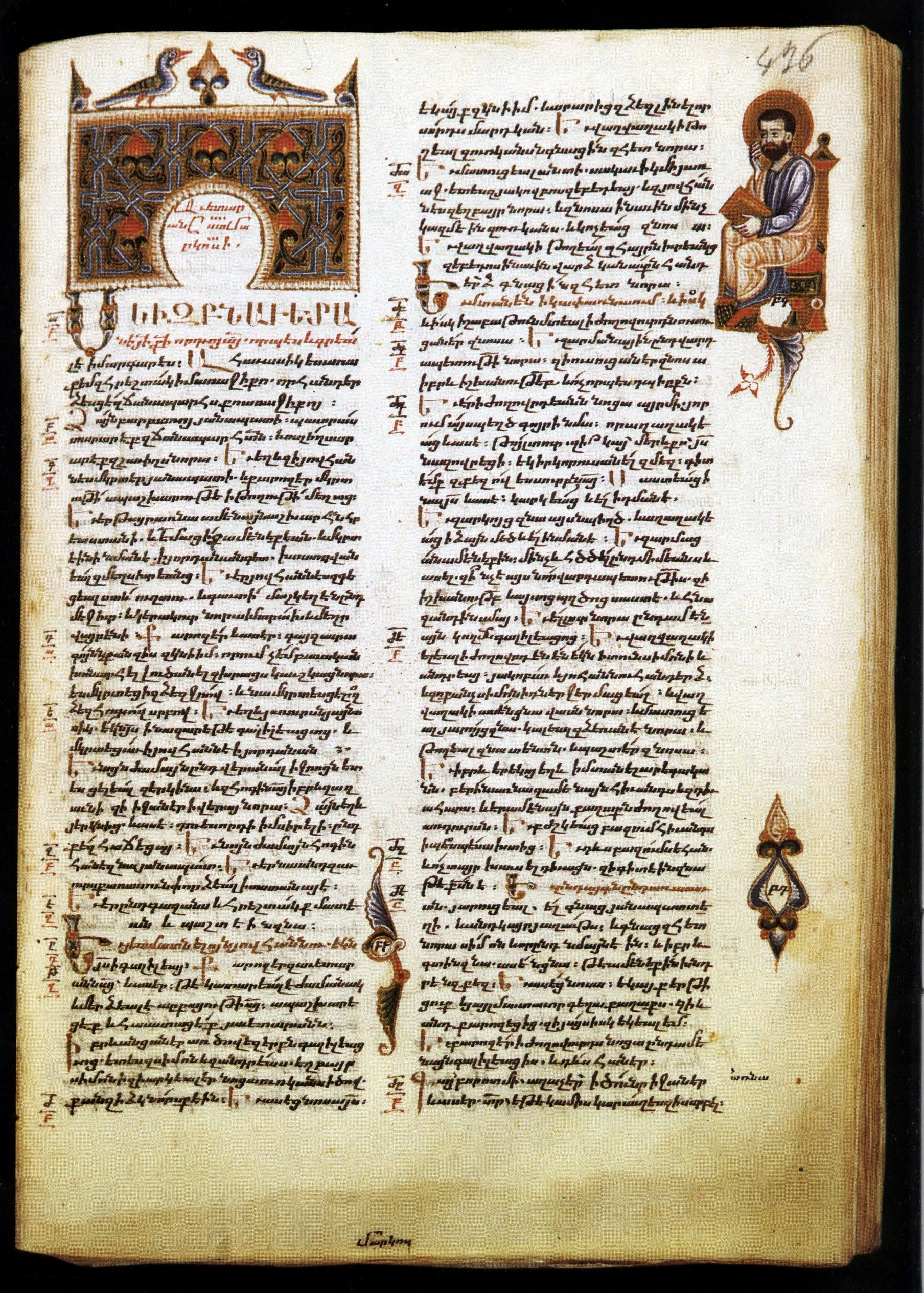
First page of the Gospel of Mark, by Sargis Pitsak, a Medieval Armenian scribe and miniaturist

The medieval period opens with comparative sterility. It was mostly important in the 8th century, that of John Otznetzi, surnamed the "Philosopher". A "Discourse against the Paulicians", a "Synodal Discourse", and a collection of the canons of the councils and the Fathers anterior to his day, are the principal works of his now extant. About the same time appeared the translations of the works of several of the Fathers, particularly of St. Gregory of Nyssa and Cyril of Alexandria, from the pen of Stephen, Bishop of Syunik. It was two centuries later that the celebrated "History of Armenia" by the Catholicos John V the Historian came forth, covering the period from the origin of the nation to the year A.D. 925. A contemporary of his, Annine of Mok, an abbot and the most celebrated theologian of the time, composed a treatise against the Tondrakians, a sect imbued with Manicheism. The name of Chosrov, Bishop of Andzevatsentz, is honoured because of his interesting commentaries on the Breviary and Mass-Prayers. Gregory of Narek, his son, is the Armenian Pindar from whose pen came elegies, odes, panegyrics, and homilies. Stepanos Asoghik, whose "Universal History" reaches down to A.D. 1004, and Gregory Magistros, whose long poem on the Old and New Testaments displays much application, are the last writers worthy of mention in this period.

=== Cilician renaissance ===
The modern period of Armenian literature can well be dated from the renaissance of letters among the Armenians in the 12th century. The Catholicos Nerses surnamed the Gracious, is the most brilliant author in the beginning of this period. Besides his poetic works, such as the "Elegy on the Taking of Edessa", there are prose works including a "Pastoral Letter", a "Synodal Discourse", and his "Letters". This age gave us also a commentary on St. Luke and one on the Catholic Epistles. Of note, too, is the Synodal Discourse of Nerses of Lambron, Archbishop of Tarsus, delivered at the Council of Hromcla in 1179, which is anti-Monophysite in tone. The 13th century gave birth to Vartan the Great, whose talents were those of a poet, an exegete, and a theologian, and whose "Universal History" is extensive in the field it covers. Gregory of Tatev in the next century composed his "Question Book", which is a fiery polemic against the Catholics. A major religious and lyric poet of the late Middle Ages was Hovhannes Tlkurantsi (c. 1450–1535).

=== Foreign rule ===
In the 15th century, Persia held sociopolitical control over Armenia, as seen in contemporary Armenian literature. However, by dispersing the Armenian population to various parts of Europe, the Persian invasion had some successful outcomes. Armenian printing shops were established in Venice and Rome, and in the 17th century, in Lemberg, Milan, Paris, and other European cities. New works were published, alongside the republishing of old works. The Mechitarists of Venice have been the leaders in this movement; but their publications, although numerous, have been seen as uncritical. Their brothers, the Mechitarists of Vienna, had also been active in this work and Balgy and Catergian, two well-known writers on Armenian topics, belong to their society. Russia, Constantinople and Etchmiadzin are the other centres of Armenian literary efforts. Etchmiadzin is known especially for being imbued today with German scientific methods and taste. In Armenian literature, there is a trait the national character displayed in the manner that Armenians have had for singing the victories of their land in history and chronicles.

=== Armenian troubadours ===
Divided between the Ottoman Empire and the Safavid Empire, the Armenians developed a troubadour tradition. A troubadour, called աշուղ (ɑˈʃuʁ) in Armenian, would go from village to village, and town to town, and would recite his literature to the people. More successful ones, such as Sayat-Nova, would participate in competitions in the courts of Georgian Kings, Muslim Khans, or Armenian Meliks. They would often talk about their feelings for their women by using the popular language that was riddled with foreign influences, instead of Classical Armenian, which was obsolete outside churches and schools.

=== Women in literature ===
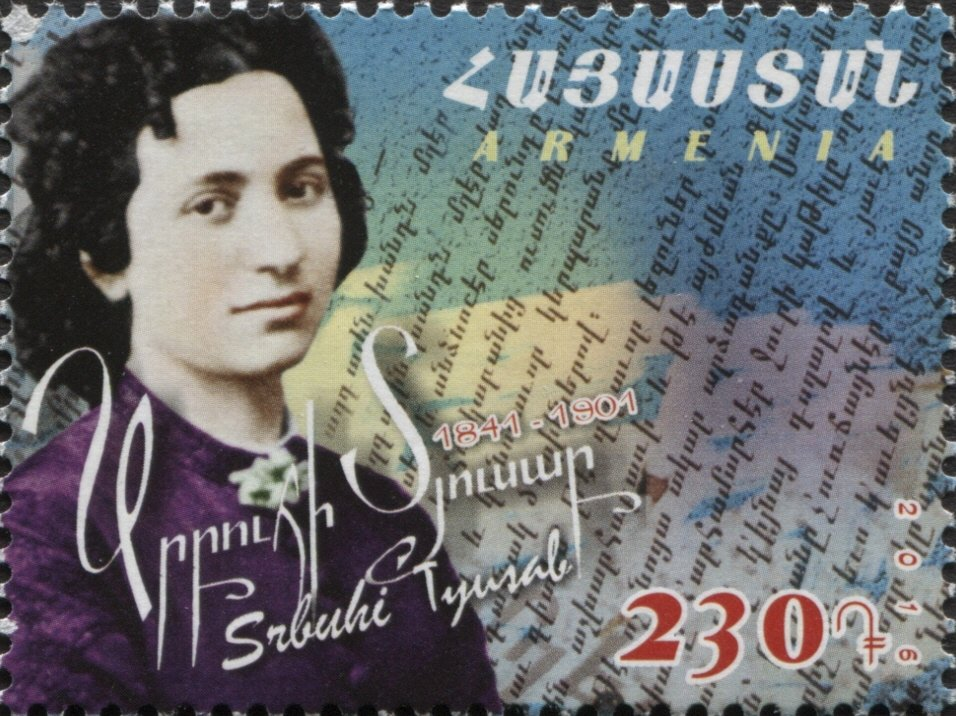
Srpouhi Dussap - Stamp of Armenia

The earliest documented examples of Armenian literature written by women date to the eighth century. The first Armenian woman to publish a novel is Srpouhi Dussap of Constantinople, who wrote and published Mayda, a feminist social critique, in the 19th century. Dussap went on to inspire other Armenian women, such as Zabel Yessayan, to write. They, in addition to their contemporary Zabel Sibil Asadour, advocated for the education, advancement, and equal treatment of Armenian women through their writings which fall underneath the Armenian population's literary renaissance in Constantinople during the 19th and 20th centuries. To ensure that their messages and writings live on, the Armenian International Women's Association has translated and published numerous works by Armenian women writers into English. Yessayan's active status in this literary renaissance resulted in her being the only Armenian woman included on the list of intellectuals that were targeted at the start of the Armenian genocide. She continued to write in Soviet Armenia until falling victim to Stalin's purges years later. Other Armenian women writers in Soviet Armenia included Sylva Kaputikyan and Shushanik Kurghinian. The number of Armenian women with literary pursuits, inside Armenia and outside amongst the diaspora, has only increased. More recent writers include: Macada Tagachian, Alicia Ghiragossian, Violet Grigoryan, Shushan Avagyan, Marine Petrossian, Vehanoush Tekian, Maroush Yeramian.

== 19th century and early 20th century ==
Notable writers from this period include Siamanto, Hagop Baronian, Vahan Tekeyan, Hovhannes Hovhannisyan, Levon Shant, Krikor Zohrab, Rupen Zartarian, Avetis Aharonyan, Garegin Nzhdeh, Atrpet, Gostan Zarian, Hrand Nazariantz, Nigol Aghpalian and Hranush Arshagian.

=== The Revivalists: Armenian Romanticists ===
The 19th century beheld a great literary movement that was to give rise to modern Armenian literature. This period of time during which Armenian culture flourished is known as the Revival period (Zartonk). The Revivalist authors of Constantinople and Tiflis, almost identical to the Romanticists of Europe, were interested in encouraging Armenian nationalism. Most of them adopted the newly created Eastern or Western variants of the Armenian language depending on the targeted audience, and preferred them over Classical Armenian (grabar).

The veritable creator of modern Armenian literature was Khachatur Abovian (1804–1848). Abovian was the first author to abandon the classical Armenian and adopt the modern for his works, thus ensuring their diffusion. Abovian's most famed work, Wounds of Armenia, returns to the theme of the Armenian people's suffering under foreign domination. Abovian dedicated his life to writing and educating others on the subject of Armenia and her people. Mikael Nalbandian's poem "Song of the Italian Girl" inspired the Armenian national anthem, "Mer Hayrenik". Raffi (Hakob Melik-Hakobian) was the grand romanticist of Armenian literature. In his works, Raffi revived the grandeur of Armenia's historic past. In the novel Sparks, the heroes fight for the liberation of their people. This theme of oppression under foreign rule is also evident in his novels Jalaleddin and The Fool.

The Revivalist period ended in 1885–1890, when the Armenian people went through tumultuous times. Notable events were the Berlin Treaty of 1878, the independence of Balkan nations such as Bulgaria, and of course, the Hamidian massacres of 1895–1896.

=== Armenian Realists ===
Newspapers

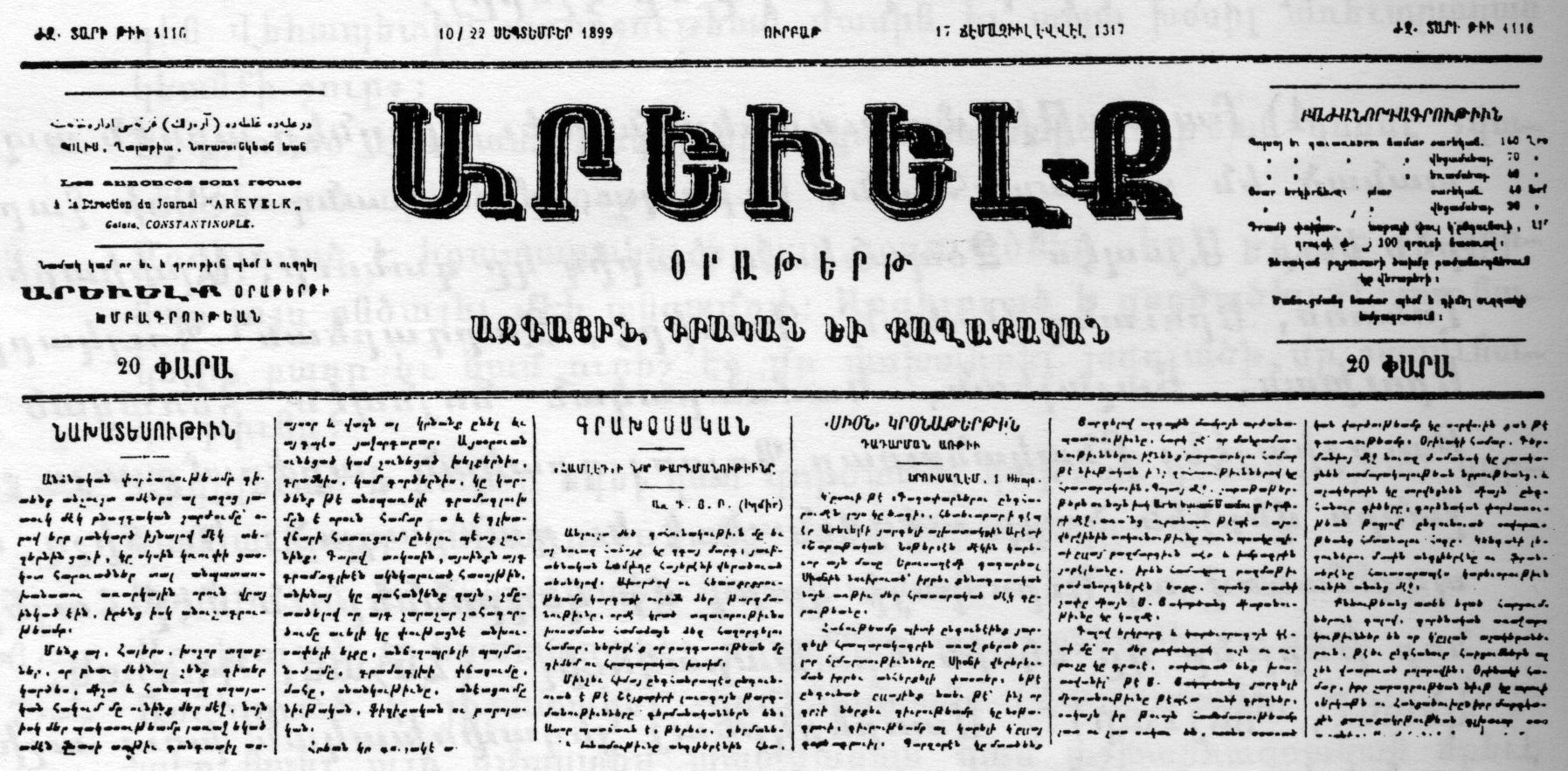
Sample from the Arevelk daily newspaper

Some specialists claim that the Armenian Realist authors appeared when the Arevelk (Orient) newspaper was founded (1884). Writers such as Arpiar Arpiarian, Levon Pashalian, Krikor Zohrab, Melkon Gurjian, Dikran Gamsarian and others revolved around the said newspaper. The other important newspaper at that time was the Hayrenik (Fatherland) newspaper, which became very populist, encouraged criticism, etc.

Despite these facts, Armenians weren't allowed to use words like Armenia, nation, fatherland, liberty, and progress in their newspapers and other written productions.

After 1885, Armenian authors were interested in depicting a realistic representation of life, along with its less attractive aspects. However, some authors retained romantic influences.

=== Soviet Armenia ===
The literary tradition of Khachatur Abovian, Mikael Nalbandian and Raffi was continued. This revival of tradition was carried out by various writers and poets such as Hovhannes Tumanyan, Yeghishe Charents and the like. This revival took place under the Communist system, much restricting the freedom of expression of the writers.

In the late 1960s, under Leonid Brezhnev, a new generation of Armenian writers emerged. As Armenian history of the 1920s and of the Genocide came to be more openly discussed, writers like Paruyr Sevak, Gevork Emin, Silva Kaputikyan and Hovhannes Shiraz began a new era of literature. With the decline in Soviet censorship, Modernist and Avantgarde artists emerged, and poets, like Henrik Edoyan and Artem Harutyunyan were producing poetry that neither was rhymed nor fitted Socialist realism.

=== Independent Armenia ===
A new generation of writers is currently burgeoning in independent Armenia. The lack of independent, objective literary criticism makes it difficult to cover this most modern era of Armenian literature. Extant tensions between the Soviet era "Writers' Union of Armenia" and independent literary groups have resulted in mutual calumnies even on issues of classification as to who Armenia's writers are.

Among the more popular of present era writers addressing issues of social dystopia and political corruption are Vahram Sahakyan and Vahe Avetian. The latter has been living in Sweden since the late nineties as a result of persecution by Armenian authorities.

Another writer whose literature is difficult to classify is the American writer Armen Melikian who briefly repatriated to Armenia in 2002 and started writing in Armenian, the official language of Armenia. Melikian has disavowed allegiance to Armenian culture or literature following his exile and ostracism, yet his most recent work "Journey to Virginland" published in the United States in 2010 garnering eleven literary awards deals with some of the most fundamental issues plaguing Armenian society, such as gender relations, religious orientation, and political corruption.

== See also ==
- Ancient Armenian poetry
- Armenian historiography of the 5th–18th centuries
- Armenian Press in France
- List of Armenian writers
- List of libraries in Armenia
  - National Library of Armenia
- Matenadaran

Armenian fairy tales

- The Golden-Headed Fish
- Habrmani
- Nourie Hadig
- Silver Hair and Golden Curls
- The Story of Zoulvisia
