= Leo (historian) =

Armenian historian, publicist, writer, critic and professor (1860-1932)

Arakel Babakhanian
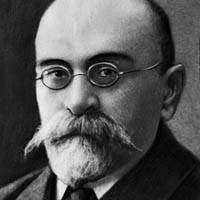
- Born: 14 April 1860; Shusha, Russian Empire
- Died: 14 November 1932 (aged 72); Yerevan, Armenian SSR, Soviet Union
- Known for: History of Armenia (Hayots' Patmut'yun) (3 volumes)
- Scientific career
- Fields: Armenian studies
- Workplaces: Yerevan State University

Arakel Grigori Babakhanian (Armenian: Առաքել Գրիգորի Բաբախանյան; 14 April [O.S. 2 April] 1860 – 14 November 1932), commonly known by his pen name Leo (Armenian: Լեո (Note: Classical orthography: Լէօ (Առաքել Բաբախանեան))), was an Armenian historian, writer, critic, and professor at Yerevan State University. He is best known for authoring a multi-volume work on the history of Armenia. Leo adopted a critical stance in examining some of the most important issues in Armenian history, literature and contemporary problems of the early 20th century.

== Biography ==
Leo was born on 14 April 1860 in the city of Shusha/Shushi in the region of Mountainous Karabakh, which was then a part of the Russian Empire. He was one of several children of Grigor Babakhanian, a tailor (later bellringer) of modest means. He graduated from the local school in Shusha in 1878. Due to the death of his father in 1879, Leo was unable to attend university and began working to support his family. He took up several jobs in Shusha and Baku as a notary's clerk, telegraph operator, and the manager of a printing house called Aror ("Plough"). He first began to write in the late 1870s. From 1895 to 1906, Leo worked as a journalist and secretary in Tiflis for the influential Armenian-language newspaper Mshak ("Tiller"). Leo would later become the editor of Mshak in 1918. In 1906, he began teaching at the Gevorgian Seminary at Ejmiatsin, although he returned to Tiflis a year later and dedicated himself to his academic work.

Politically, Leo was opposed to the policies of the Armenian Revolutionary Federation (Dashnakts’ut’yun) political party and was a member of the Armenian Populist Party, joining it in 1917. Soviet sources, however, claim that Leo was not affiliated with any political party. He was an adviser to the delegation of the Seim of the Transcaucasian Democratic Federative Republic during its negotiations with the Ottomans Trabzon in March 1918. He served as the president of the Karabakh Armenian Patriotic Association from 1918 to 1920. In 1919, during the existence of the First Republic of Armenia, Leo visited Yerevan to participate as a guest lecturer in the public educational program organized by Minister of Education Nikol Aghbalian. Leo welcomed the sovietization of Armenia in 1920 and offered his services to the newly established state. He was invited to lecture in history and other subjects in Armenian studies at Yerevan State University in 1924. In 1925, he was granted the rank of professor and made a member of the Academy of Science and Art of the Armenian SSR, the predecessor to the republic's Academy of Sciences. Leo continued to teach, research and write until his sudden death. He died in Yerevan on 14 November 1932.

== Career ==
Leo never received a higher education and his knowledge and erudition was almost entirely self-taught. He first began to write in the late 1870s. Over the years, he wrote for various Armenian newspapers and journals, such as Mshak, Ardzagank’, Armenia, Murch, and Handes Amsorya. He was influenced by the liberal nationalist writers Raffi and Grigor Artsruni (the founder of Mshak). From about 1880 to 1900, Leo mostly wrote works of fiction, reviews, and articles on contemporary issues, whereas from 1900 onward, he focused on writing history. In 1901–1902, he published a two-volume work titled Haykakan tpagrut’yun (Armenian printing), which studies the cultural, intellectual and political life of Armenians between the sixteenth and eighteenth centuries.

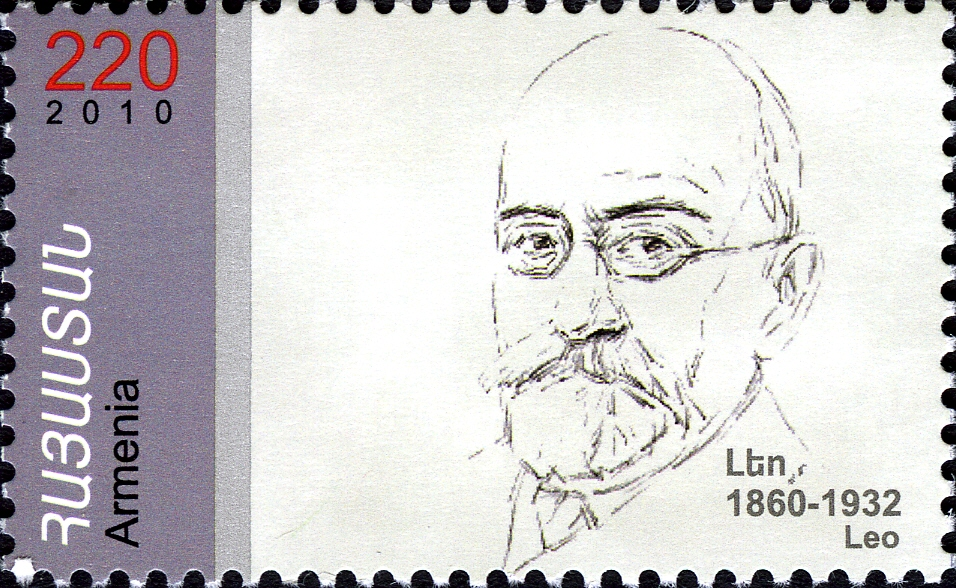
Stamp commemorating the 150th anniversary of Leo's birthday.

Leo's most noteworthy work is his three-volume History of Armenia (Patmut’yun Hayots’, vol. 1 originally published in Tiflis, 1917; vols. 2 and 3, Yerevan, 1946–1947; republished in 1966–73). His work traces Armenian history from its beginnings until the end of the nineteenth century, with the exception of the period stretching from the eleventh to the fifteenth centuries (the third volume begins with the sixteenth century, whereas the second volume ends in the eleventh). It devotes particular importance to the political, cultural and social issues that surrounded Armenian life and the role that Armenia's neighbors played in the country's history. Leo's History is valued for its extensive use of primary and secondary sources and for its engaging and understandable style. After Soviet Russian writer Andrei Bitov visited Yerevan in 1960, he remarked that "he did not enter any house which did not have the familiar three volumes of Leo's History of Armenia."

Besides his historical and social-political writings, Leo also wrote some literary criticism, translations of European authors, and a number of fictional works in the style of realism. These works included short stories, novels, and plays, almost all dating to the earlier part of his career. For Leo, literature was more important as a means of moral and intellectual education than as a form of artistic expression. The usual theme of his short works is the backwardness and misery of Armenian rural life. His stories set in cities depict the injustices of the capitalist system. A few of his short stories and his novel Melik’i aghjikë (The melik's daughter) are set in his native Karabakh.

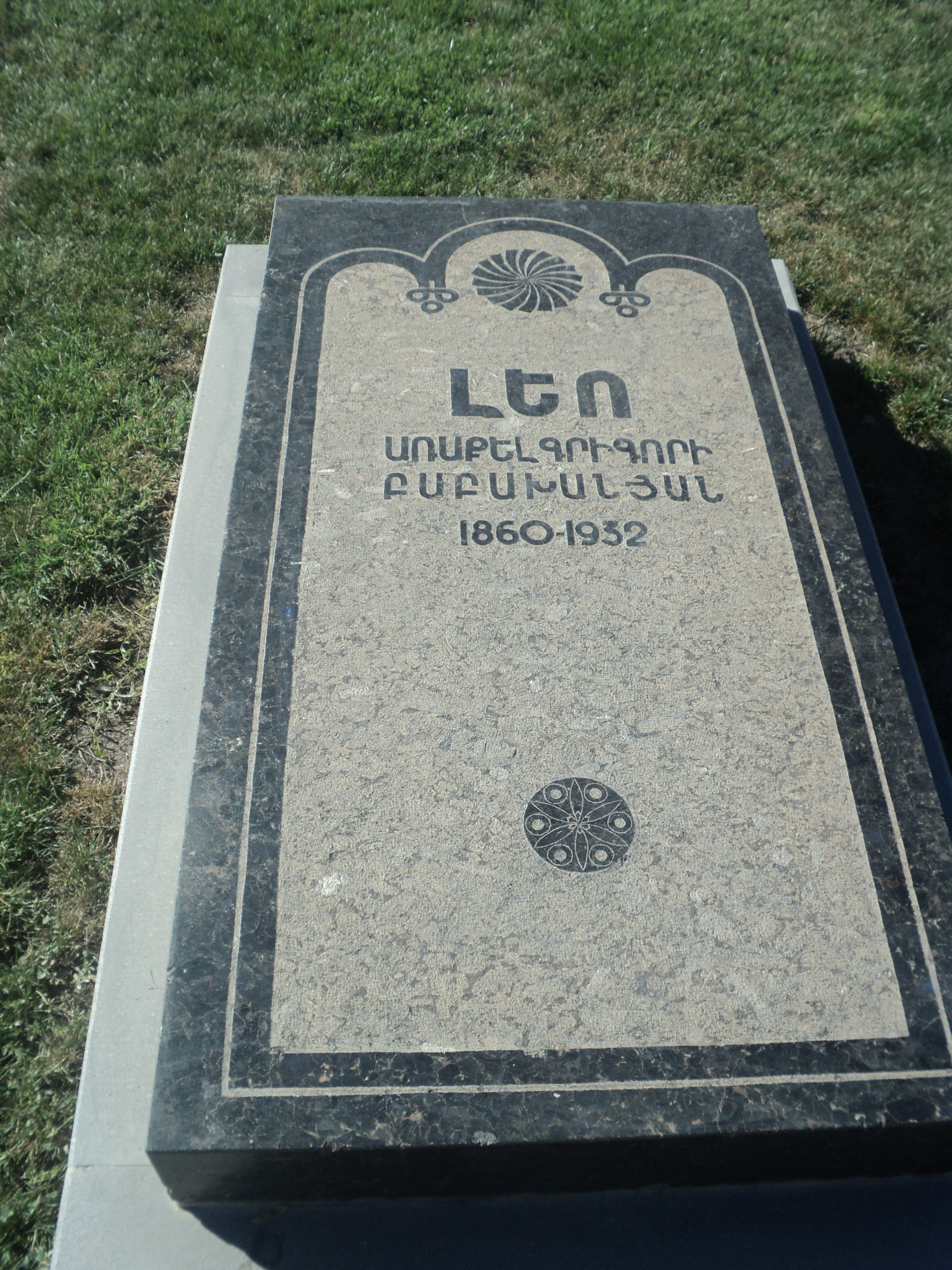
Leo's grave at Komitas Pantheon in Yerevan.

== Sources ==
- Bardakjian, Kevork B., ed. (2000). A Reference Guide to Modern Armenian Literature, 1500–1920: With an Introductory History. Wayne State University Press. ISBN 9780814327470.
- Griffin, Nicholas (2004). Caucasus: A Journey to the Land between Christianity and Islam. Chicago: University of Chicago Press. p. .
- Hacikyan, Agop J.; Franchuk, Edward S.; Basmajian, Gabriel; Ouzounian, Nourhan (2005). The Heritage of Armenian Literature, vol. 3: From the Eighteenth Century to Modern Times. Detroit: Wayne State University. ISBN 0-8143-3221-8.
- Harutyunian, Sh.; Ohanian, A. (1978). "Leo". In Simonian, Abel (ed.). Haykakan sovetakan hanragitaran [Armenian Soviet Encyclopedia] (in Armenian). Vol. 4. Yerevan. pp. 566–567.
- Hovannisian, Richard G. (1982). The Republic of Armenia, vol. 2: From Versailles to London, 1919-1920. Berkeley: University of California Press.
- Nersisian, M. (1966). "Prof․ Leoyi patmagitakan zharangut῾yune" [Prof. Leo's Historical Heritage]. In Grigorian, Z.; et al. (eds.). Leo․ Erkeri Zhoghovatsu. arajin hator [Leo: Collected Works, volume one] (PDF) (in Armenian). Yerevan: Hayastan hratarakch῾ut῾yun. pp. v–xv.
- Walker, Christopher J (1990). Armenia: The Survival of a Nation. New York: Palgrave Macmillan. ISBN 0-312-04230-2.
