= Anna Hormouz =

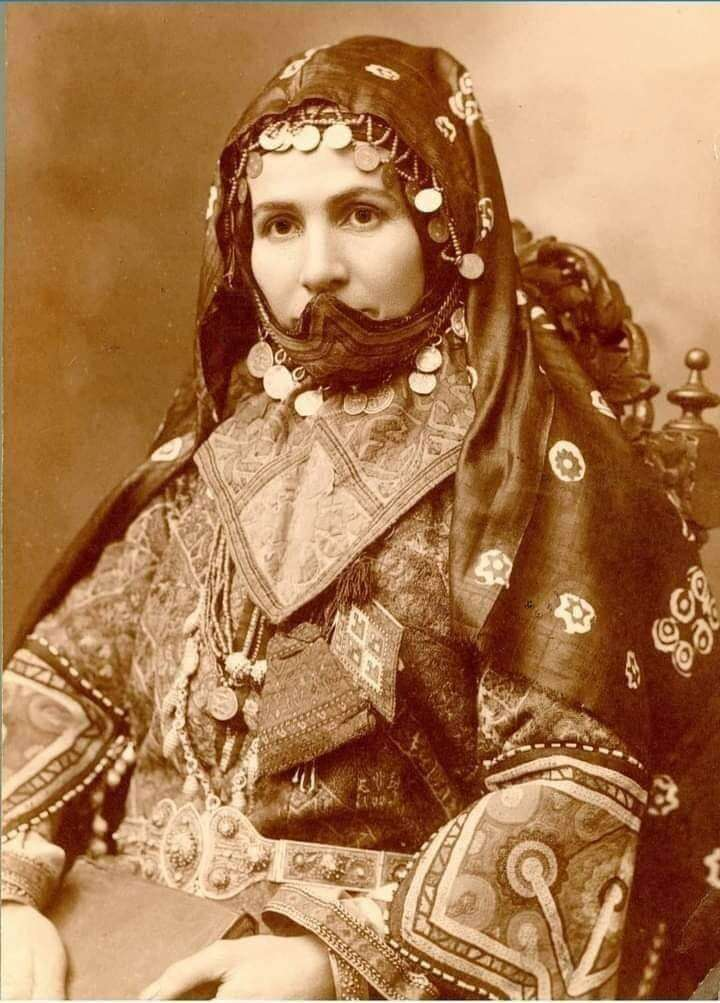
- Anna Hormouz in the traditional Armenian dress of Salmas, circa 1860
- Born: circa 1850; Qajar Persia
- Died: June 1920; London, England
- Occupations: scholar and publisher
- Spouse: Raffi

Anna Hormouz (Armenian: Աննա Հուրմուզ), also known as Mrs. Anna Raffi, was the wife of renowned Armenian novelist Raffi and mother of Aram and Arshak Melik-Hakobian. Anna was largely responsible for the publication of her husband's works in London after he passed, as well as, a devoted scholar of the Armenian question.

== Biography ==
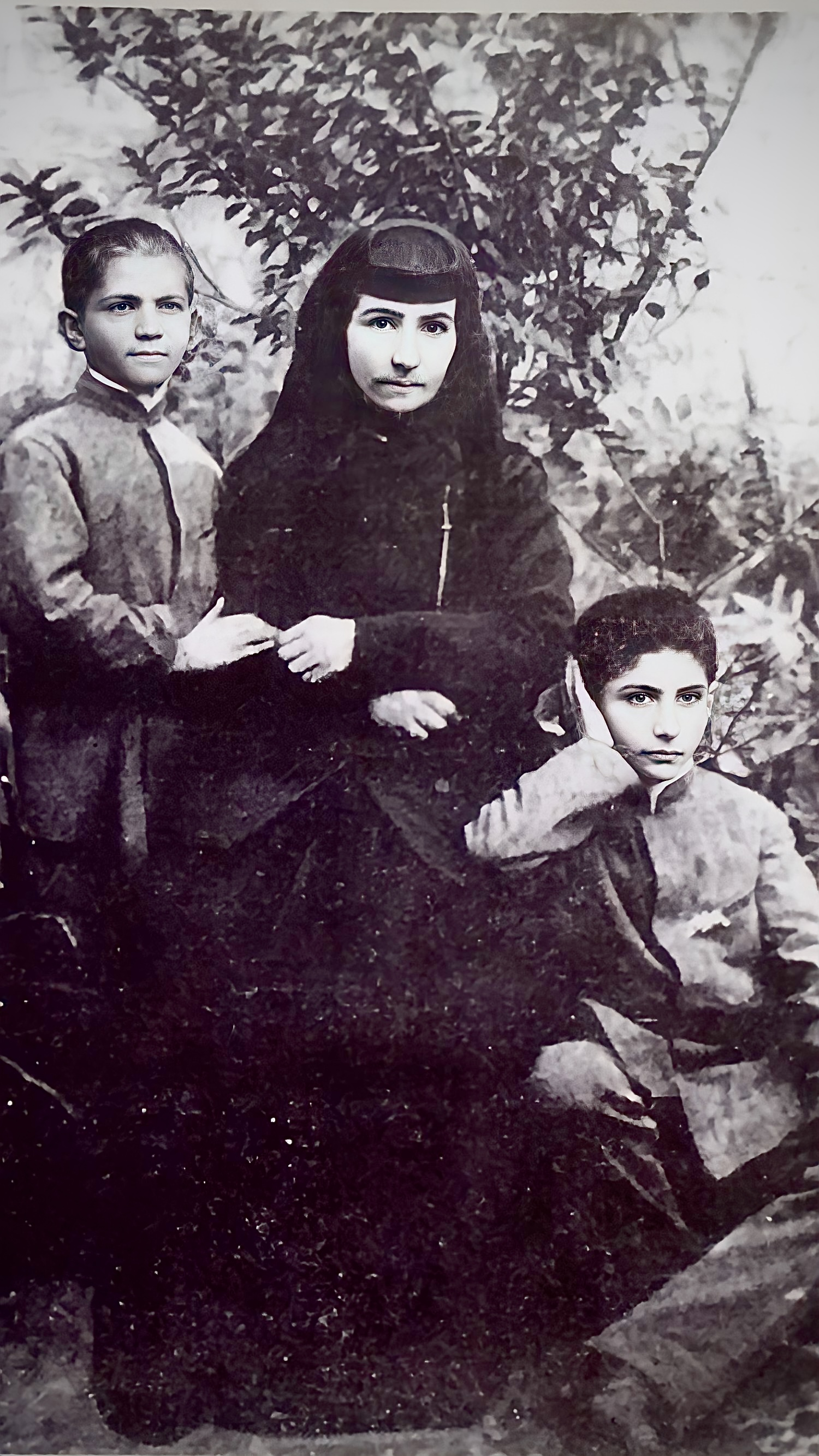
Anna Hormouz with her two sons, Aram and Arshak Melik-Hakobian, in Tabriz

Anna Hormouz was born in Qajar Persia to an Assyrian Protestant family. In 1863, she married her husband Raffi, an Armenian author and leading figure in 19th-century Armenian literature, whom she met in Salmas. They went on to have two sons, Aram and Arshak Melik-Hakobian, and a daughter, Esther, who died at a young age. Anna was widowed in 1880 by the death of her husband. She and her two sons left Tbilisi for St.Petersburg due to financial difficulties. She eventually ended up in London at the end of the 19th century where she became an active scholar of the Armenian question. Anna went on to devote the rest of her life to the publication of her husbands works with the help of the Mekhitarist congregation in Vienna. Additionally, she worked on fixing the mistakes in the biography of her husband.

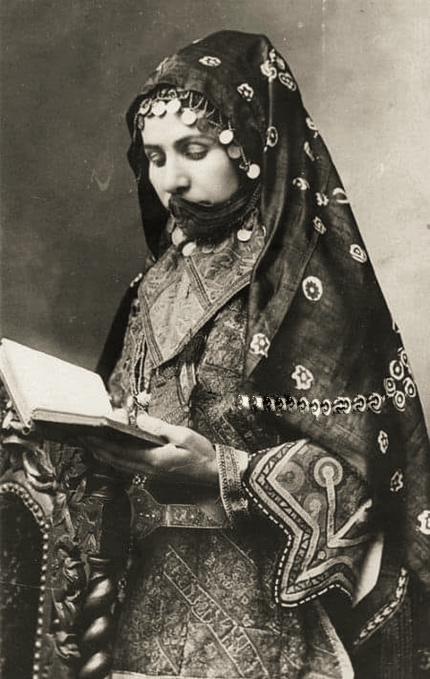
Anna Hormouz studying in London

One of Raffi's best friends, M. Veratsin, who had been close to them for many years, described Anna Hormouz in an article published in the "Hayrenik" magazine about "Raffi and his family (memories and reflections).

Mrs. Raffi was a middle-aged woman with delicate and regular features, very polite, educated and very hospitable. She attended the Urmia Missionary Girls' School. She was of Assyrian descent and I heard that she was the daughter of an Assyrian king. Her maiden name was day. Anna Hurmuz. His brother lived in the United States from 1900-1908 and visited Chicago several times, where he settled. I do not remember whether Mrs. Anna had other brothers or sisters. Mrs. Anna spoke and wrote very fluently in Armenian and Assyrian. She also knew Atrpatakan Turkish, Russian and Georgian. She spoke, read and wrote in English. I have often seen Mrs. Raffi's beautiful correspondence with her relatives in Assyria.

Anna Hormouz died a widow in London in June 1920.

== See also ==
- Grigor Artsruni
- Women in Armenia
