= Raphael Patkanian =

Armenian poet

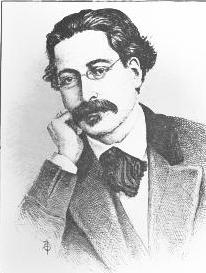
- Born: 20 November 1830; Nakhichevan-on-Don, Russian Empire
- Died: 7 September 1892 (aged 61); Nakhichevan-on-Don, Russian Empire
- Occupation: writer
- Writing career
- Pen name: Gamar Katipa

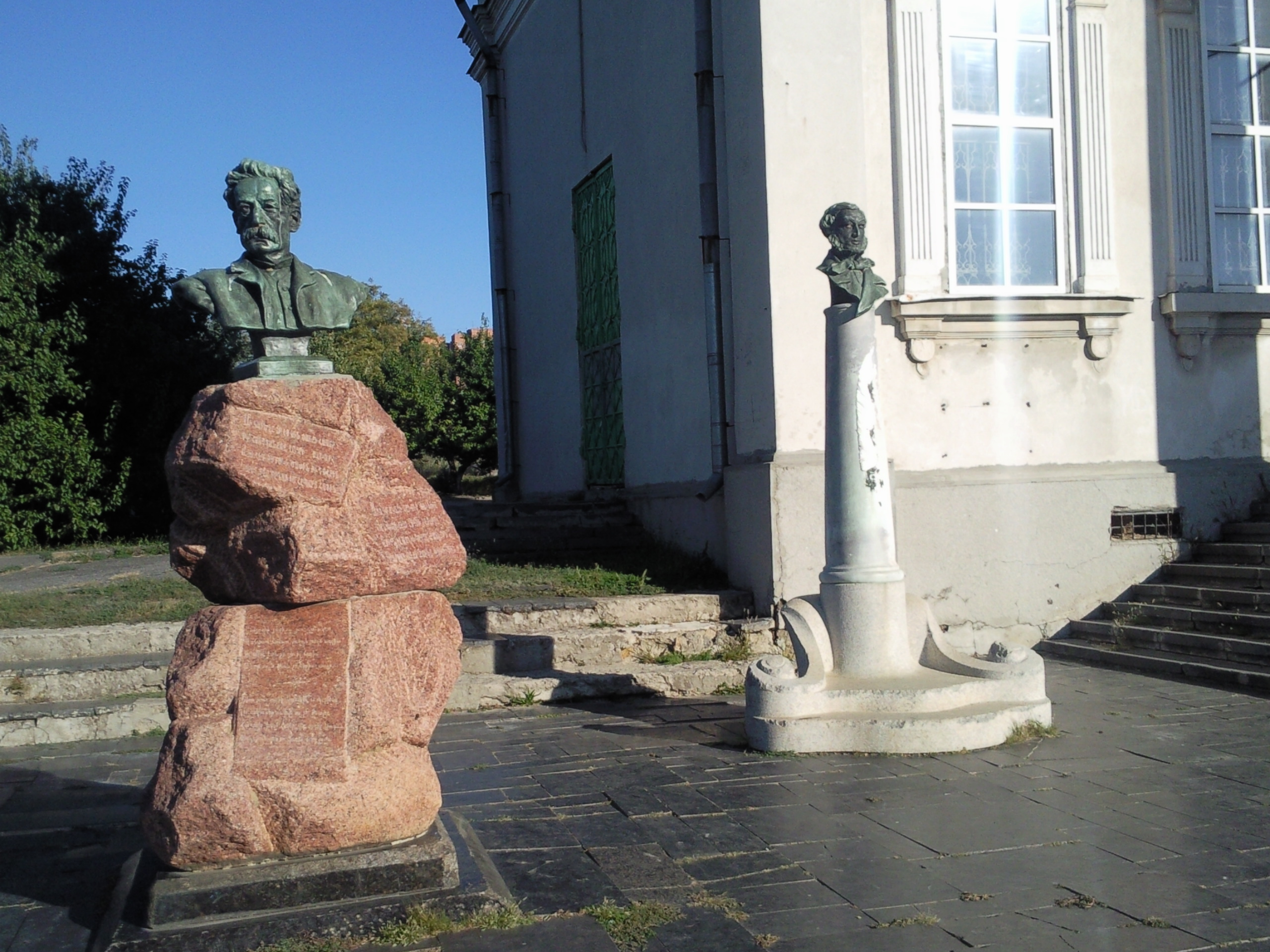
Patkanian's (left) and Mikayel Nalbandian's graves in Nor Nakhijevan

Raphael Patkanian (Armenian: Ռափայէլ Պատկանեան, (Note: Reformed orthography: Ռափայել Պատկանյան. Also spelled Rafayel, Rapayel, Rafael. Though spelled in Armenian with the letter փ p’, his given name is sometimes pronounced with an f sound in place of the p’.) 20 November [O.S. 8 November] 1830 – 7 September [O.S. 26 August] 1892), also known by the penname Gamar Katipa (Գամառ Քաթիպա), (Note: Also spelled Kamar Katiba after the Western Armenian pronunciation) was a nineteenth-century Russian Armenian writer and educator. He was born into a noted family of Armenian intellectuals in Nakhichevan-on-Don and began writing in his student years. He gained popularity for his poetry, much of which is written on patriotic themes.

== Biography ==
Patkanian was born on 20 November [O.S. 8 November] 1830 in Nakhichevan-on-Don (now within Rostov-on-Don), Russia, into a noted family of intellectuals. His grandfather, Serovbe Patkanian, was a poet and educator, and his father, Gabriel, was a clergyman, author and social activist. He had an older brother, Hovhannes, who became a painter. He was the first cousin of scholar Kerovbe Patkanian. He began his education in the private school founded by his father, where one of his classmates was Mikayel Nalbandian, another future writer. After some time living with and being taught by his uncle Petros in Stavropol, he attended the Lazarev Institute in Moscow from 1843 to 1849. Before graduating, he moved to Tiflis with his father, who had been appointed principal of the Nersisian School. He continued his education at the universities of Dorpat (1851–52), Moscow (1852–1854), and Saint Petersburg (1855–60), finally graduating from the latter, having specialized in Oriental studies.

Patkanian published his first poems in the weekly Ararat, which was founded and edited by his father. While he was in Moscow, he formed a literary club with two fellow students, Gevorg Kananian and Minas (or Mnatsakan) Timurian, which they named Gamar Katipa, an acronym formed from the first letters of their given names and the first syllables of their surnames. Patkanian later adopted Gamar Katipa as a penname. The group published its first pamphlet in 1855. Their literary philosophy was expressed in the motto "Write as you speak; speak as you write." By 1857, the group had published four more pamphlets, most of them authored by Patkanian. He published works in several periodicals starting in 1860. In 1863, he founded his own journal, Hyusis, which ceased publication after one year. He published his first collection of poems (Gamar’-K’at’ipayi banasteghtsut’yunk’ë, Poems of Gamar Katipa) in 1864 to widespread acclaim. This was followed by a pause in his literary career, but by then he was already a well-known author. He moved back to Nakhichevan-on-Don in 1866 and dedicated himself to writing and pedagogy, working as a teacher at the local parish school. In 1879, he helped found a vocational school for impoverished children. He served as its director until his death in 1892.

Patkanian's younger contemporary Shirvanzade, who met him a few times in Tiflis and valued his work, describes Patkanian's personality and appearance in his memoirs. He writes that he was "of shorter than average height, neither fat nor thin, dark-skinned, with piercing eyes under his simple glasses, which eyes sometimes resembled those of some kind of predator; his face was always clean-shaven, his graying mustache was a little trimmed, and his mouth was crooked[…]." He writes that Patkanian spoke mostly in Russian (fluently, but with a Nakhichevan-on-Don accent), and that he spoke in a loud, commanding voice. He notes Patkanian's prickly personality—he had a propensity to bitterly satirize anyone he did not like—and his quarrels with other Armenian writers, such as Grigor Artsruni and Raffi.

== Work ==
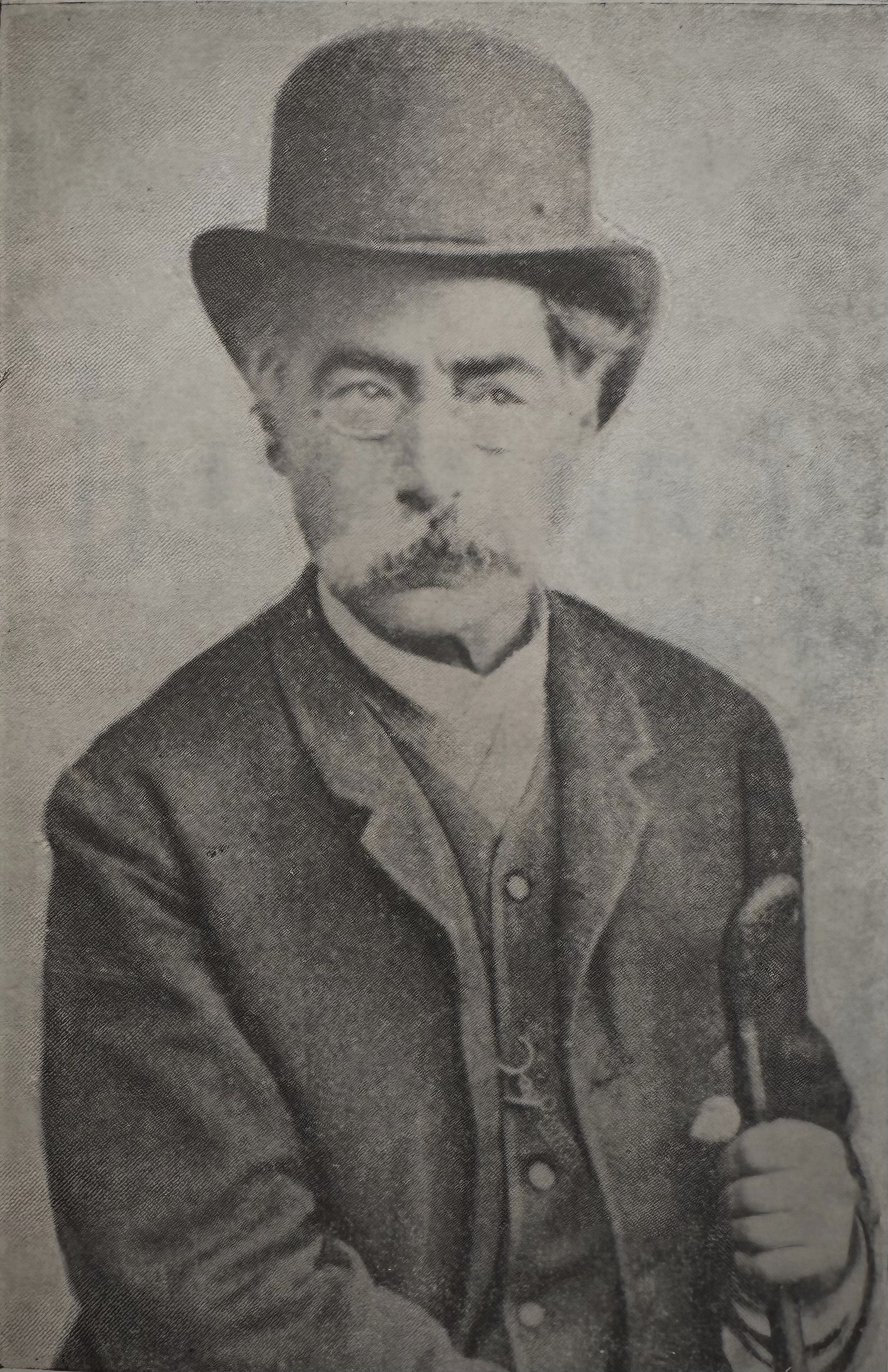
A photograph of Patkanian in his later years

Patkanian wrote poetry, as well as novels, short stories, memoirs, textbooks, and children's songs and poems. His poems are mostly written in the vernacular language. Like Khachatur Abovian before him, he promoted the use of vernacular Armenian (as opposed to Classical Armenian) as a literary language. Some of his works are written in his native Nakhichevan-on-Don dialect. His first poems are about merrymaking and youth, but he soon shifted to the topic of the struggles of the Armenian people. He sought to use his poetry to promote patriotic ideals and to advance the cause of the enlightenment and liberation of his nation. Like many other Armenian writers of his time, he believed in the social utility of literature and emphasized this over artistic form. Two of his poems which have enjoyed lasting popularity are "Arak’si artasuk’ë" (The tears of the Araxes) and "Vardan Mamikoneani mahë" (The death of Vardan Mamikonian), both written on patriotic themes. The first poem is a dialogue between the poet and the river, personified as the mother of the Armenian people who is lamenting the suffering of her children. In Kevork Bardakjian's view, the poem achieves an "intimate dynamism" and combines feelings of grief and loss with an unsaid optimism. The second work is an epic poem has the fifth-century Battle of Avarayr between the Armenians and the Persians as its subject. The section of the poem "Vardan's Song," which calls on Armenians to rise up against their oppressors, is particularly popular.

His second collection of poems, Azat yerger (Free songs, 1878), was written in reaction to Ottoman atrocities during the Russo-Turkish War of 1877–1878. He was one of the first Armenian authors to highlight the suffering of the Ottoman Armenians in Muş and Van as conditions for Armenians in the Ottoman Empire worsened. Like his predecessors Khachatur Abovian and Mikayel Nalbandian and his contemporary Raffi, he called on Armenians to engage in self-defense. His poems written after the Russo-Turkish War reflect the disappointment that dominated among Armenians, as the goal of achieving reforms in Ottoman Armenia now seemed impossible. In his poem "Boghok’ ar’ Yevropa," (Protest to Europe), he strongly condemned the indifference of the European powers to the plight of the Armenians. In some of his other patriotic poems, Patkanian criticized Armenian clergymen for promoting inaction and those who were apathetic to national issues. Patkanian also wrote short stories and satirical works in his native dialect on social issues within the Armenian community. In these works, he depicted social and political abuses, immoral merchants and priests, and a decadent youth.

== Influence and legacy ==
Patkanian's poetry made him one of the leading Armenian poets for several decades. His poems were often set to music and were particularly popular among the Armenian youth of his time. Shirvanzade described him as "the sole popularized Armenian lyrical poet of his time," noting that his "Arak’si artasuk’ë" and "Boghok’ ar’ Yevropa" were sung and recited "on stages, in homes and everywhere that there was a handful of Armenians." Some even dubbed him "the poet of all Armenians," (Note: The epithet (amenayn hayots’ banasteghts) is a play on the title of the head of the Armenian Apostolic Church, the Catholicos of All Armenians.) an epithet that was later more famously attributed to Hovhannes Tumanyan. The Russian poet Valery Bryusov also valued Patkanian's poetry, seeing its main strength in its "intense patriotism, unfailing dedication to [his] native people, which is expressed not only through odes, but also through bitter satire." In Bardakjian's view, "[a]lthough too many of [Patkanian's] poems read like rhymed speeches, his sincere and emotional patriotic appeal resonated with the prevailing mood."

Meri Saghian called Patkanian "one of the founders of Armenian civic poetry" (poetry that deals with social and political issues). In his speech in Yerevan of March 1954, Anastas Mikoyan called for reviving the legacy of Patkanian, alongside Raffi, Yeghishe Charents, and Alexander Miasnikian, beginning the Khrushchev Thaw in Soviet Armenia. The writer's collected works were published in eight volumes from 1963 to 1974.

== Selected works ==
This is a selection of Patkanian's works, including all of the collections of poetry published in his lifetime and a list of his works which have been translated into English.

=== Collections of poetry ===
- (1855–1857) Gamaṛ-Kʻatʻipayi ardzak ew chʻapʻaberakan ashkhatutʻiwnnerě Գամառ-Քաթիպայի արձակ եւ չափաբերական աշխատութիւնները [Gamar-Katipa's prose and versified works]. Saint Petersburg. 5 pamphlets (1, 2, 3, 4, 5).
- (1864) Gamaṛ-Kʻatʻipayi banasteghtsutʻiwnkʻě Գամառ-Քաթիպայի բանաստեղծութիւնքը [Gamar-Katipa's poems]. Moscow: Tparan Lazareantsʻ chemarani. Published under the pseudonym Gamar-Katipa. (Read online.)
- (1878) Azat erger Ազատ երգեր [Free songs]. Tiflis: Tparan Hambardzumay Ēnfiacheantsʻ ew ěnk. "Pʻordz" azgayin handisi hrat. Published under the pseudonym Gamar-Katipa. (Read online.)
- (1879) Nor Nakhijewani kʻnar Նոր Նախիջեւանի քնար [Lyre of Nakhichevan-on-Don]. Rostov-on-Don: Tparan Yovhannu Tēr-Abrahamean. Published under the pseudonym Siwliwk. (Read online.)
- (1880) Mankakan erger Մանկական երգեր [Children's songs]. Tiflis: Tparan Y. Martiroseantsʻi. Published under the pseudonym Gamar-Katipa. (Read online.)

=== Stories and novellas ===
- (1884) Tikin ew nazhisht Տիկին եւ նաժիշտ [Lady and servant girl]. Tiflis: Tparan Y. Martiroseantsʻi. (Novella. Read online.)
- (1905) Shaterēn mekě Շատերէն մեկը [One out of many]. Nakhichevan-on-Don: Tparan Serovbē Awageantsʻi. (Story. Read online.)
- (1909) Chʻakhu Չախու [Knife]. Tiflis: Hasker amsagri hrat. (Story, orig. date 1875; translated from the Nakhichevan dialect by Stepan Lisitsian. Read online.)

=== Works translated into English ===
- (1901) Arnot, Robert. Armenian Literature. New York: Colonial Press. pp. 48, 49–54. (Anthology. Read online.)
- (1913) Boyajian, Z. "Leretz amberi". Armenia. 10: 294.
- (1916) Blackwell, A. "Let the Wind Blow". The New Armenia (11): 173.
- (1917) Blackwell, A. S. Armenian Poems. Boston: Robert Chambers. pp. 66–94, 250. (Anthology. Read online.)
- (1929) Arnot, Robert. "Sweet Lady, Whence the Sadness in your Face?". The New Armenia (1): 11–12.
- (1961) "The Tears of Araxes". Shoghagat. 67. (Read online.)
