= Murad Meneshian =

American researcher and writer (1936–2016)

- Born: July 3, 1936; Baghdad, Iraq
- Died: October 11, 2016 (aged 80); Glenview, Illinois, U.S.
- Education: University of Illinois (BS); Texas Christian University
- Occupations: Research chemist; journalist; translator; researcher

Murad Meneshian (July 3, 1936 – October 11, 2016) was an Armenian American research chemist, journalist, translator, and researcher.

== Life and career ==
Born in Baghdad, Iraq of Armenian descent, he emigrated to the United States in 1957. He was an alumnus of University of Illinois (BS) and Texas Christian University (MS). He worked for Abbott Laboratories, Teletype Corporation, and AT&T/Lucent Technologies (Bell Laboratories) as an analytical chemist and had several patents in the field of science.

His articles were published in the Proceedings of the Third International Symposium on Very Large Scale Integration Science and Technology. He engaged in many studies of Armenia and Mesopotamia. He translated from Armenian to English Vahan Hampartsumian's Giughashkharh and engaged in a study of the life and works of famed Armenian writer Raffi. As a result, he published the book Raffi: The Prophet from Payajuk in 2010. For many years he was a regular contributor to the Armenian Weekly.

Meneshian died in Glenview, Illinois on October 11, 2016, at the age of 80.

== Works ==
- Raffi: The Prophet from Payajuk (2010)
- Village World (Kiughashkharh): An Historical and Cultural Study of Govdoon (translated)
