= Hambardzum Arakelian =

Armenian journalist, writer and public activist

Hambardzum Arakelian (Armenian: Համբարձում Առաքելյան Shahriar (Armenian: Շահրիար), 1865, Shusha, Russian Empire – 1918, Tbilisi) was an Armenian journalist, writer and public activist, the founder of The Relief Committee for Armenian migrants (1915) and Armenian Populist Party.

== Biography ==
He studied in Shushi, then in Baku and Moscow, then moved to Tbilisi, where edited "Mshak" paper (succeed to Grigor Artsruni). He participated to Hague Peace Conference, marked the necessity of reforms in Armenians-inhabited territories of Ottoman Empire. An opposer of October Revolution, he was killed in 1918.

== Sources ==
- Concise Armenian Encyclopedia, Ed. by acad. K. Khudaverdyan, Yerevan, 1990, Vol. 1, pp. 145–146.
