= Harem (novel) =

1874 novella by Raffi

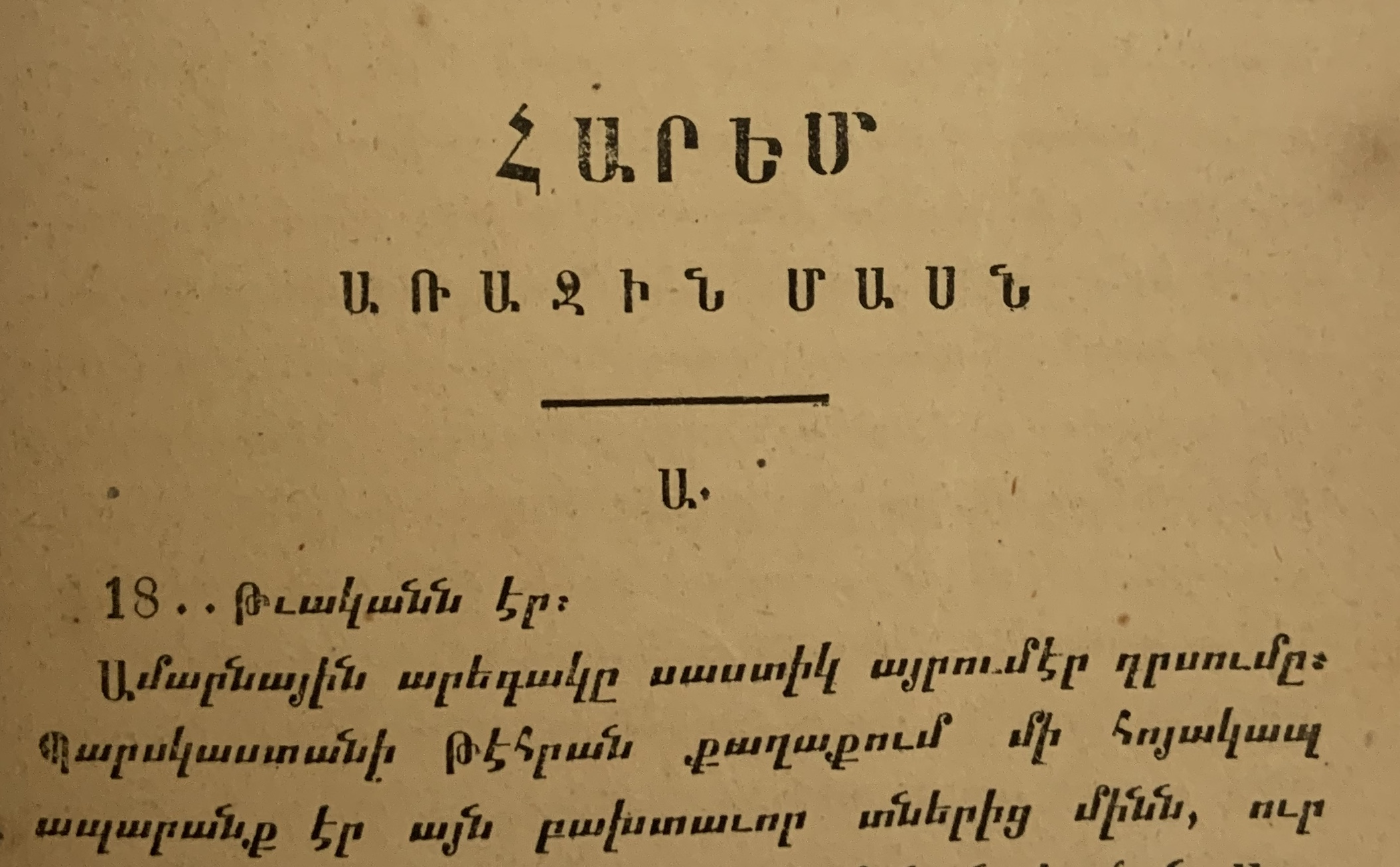
- Author: Raffi
- Language: Armenian
- Genre: Historical fiction
- Publication date: 1891 (part one published 1874)
- Publication place: Tiflis, Russian Empire
- English publication date: 2020
- Media type: Print
- Original text: Harem at Armenian Wikisource

Harem (Armenian: Հարեմ) is an Armenian-language novella by the Armenian novelist Raffi. The first part of the work was published in the book P’unj in 1874; the first and second parts were published together for the first time in the book Vepikner yev patkerner in 1891, three years after Raffi's death.

The book is set in the royal harem of the prince of Persia the 19th century, probably after the Russo-Persian War (1804-1813). Two of the characters in the book, the Prince and Zeynep, have real-life analogues in Fath-Ali Shah Qajar, and one of his 165 consorts, an Armenian from Tiflis who was given the name Gul-Pirhan. Raffi's adversaries translated Harem to Persian in 1876 and took it to Mozaffar ad-Din Shah Qajar, who at the time was the governor of the province where Raffi was living in Tabriz, when the reaction of Raffi's adversaries caused his exile from Agulis.

== Background and publication ==
Raffi wrote the first part of Harem during his visit to his home village in Iran in 1869 and probably wrote the second part immediately afterwards. The first part of Harem was first published in the second volume of P’unj, a collection of Raffi's works, in 1874. Raffi intended to publish the second part and ending of the work in the third volume of P’unj; however, the second, incomplete part of Harem was first published (together with part one) in the book Vepikner yev patkerner in 1891, three years after Raffi's death. An English translation of the novella by Beyon Miloyan and Kimberley McFarlane was published in 2020.
