= The Golden Rooster =

1870 novel by Raffi

- Author: Raffi
- Original title: (Ոսկի աքաղաղ Voski ak’aghagh )
- Language: Armenian
- Genre: Novel
- Publication date: 1870
- Publication place: Armenia
- Media type: Print

The Golden Rooster (Ոսկի աքաղաղ Voski ak’aghagh) is an 1870 Armenian language novel by the novelist Raffi. The novel was adapted into a play by the Hamazkayin Theatre. Its English translation by Donald Abcarian was published in 2008 by the Taderon Press of the Gomidas Institute in London.
