= Sparks (Raffi novel) =

1884 novel by Raffi

- Author: Raffi
- Original title: (Կայծեր Kaitser)
- Language: Armenian
- Genre: Novel
- Publication date: 1884
- Publication place: Armenia
- Media type: Print

Sparks (Կայծեր Kaitser) is an 1884 Armenian language novel by the novelist Raffi. The novel was translated into Russian as «Искры» (1949).
