= Henrik Edoyan =

Armenian poet and translator

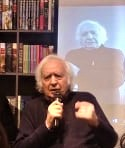
- Edoyan in 2019
- Born: Henrik Yedoyan; August 31, 1940 (age 85); Yerevan, Armenia
- Occupations: Poet, academician
- Writing career
- Genre: Poetry
- Literary movement: Modernism

Henrik Edoyan (Armenian: Հենրիկ Էդոյան) is an Armenian poet, translator, university professor and academician.

== Biography ==
Henrik Edoyan was born in Yerevan, Soviet Armenia to the family of Anton and Atlas Yedoyans as the 5th out of 6 children that survived to adulthood. Anton was originally from Erzerum, Ottoman Empire and had moved to Russian Armenia after losing the first wife and children to the Armenian genocide.

After leaving the Soviet Army in 1962, Henrik entered to Yerevan State University to study philology. Later he moved to Moscow for post-graduate studies at Maxim Gorky Literature Institute. In 1974 he earned his PhD with thesis 'Literary Criticism and Aestheticism in Armenia of the Beginning of 20th Century'. In 1990 he was awarded a Doctor of Sciences degree for his work "The Poetics of Yeghishe Charents". He joined the faculty of Philology in 1973, was appointed a professor in 1991. His sabbatical of 1995-1996 he has spent at Haigazian University in Beirut, Lebanon.

In 2005 Council of Europe magazine Naturopa ran a special issue entitled Landscape through Literature presenting works of the very best European writers, e.g. William Shakespeare, Arthur Rimbaud, Rainer Maria Rilke and J.W. Goethe, also included the poem Stood the tree alone by Henrik Edoyan.

His works have been published in many languages, including English, French, Russian, Italian, German, Spanish, Polish, Slovak, and Macedonian.

== Major awards ==
2002 - Gold Medal of the Writer's Union of Armenia

2006 - Republic of Armenia State Prize in Literature

2010 - 'Honorary Worker of Culture' title

2013 - President of Armenia Prize

2024 - Honorary Citizen of Yerevan
