= Agop Jack Hacikyan =

Armenian Canadian literary scholar, historian and writer

Agop Jack Hacikyan (25 November 1931 – 3 July 2015) was an Armenian Canadian literary scholar, historian and writer. He served as Professor of Literary Studies and Dean of Studies at the Royal Military College Saint-Jean. He was born in Istanbul, Turkey in 1931. He is the author of over 30 books on literature and linguistics, and eight novels, including A Summer Without Dawn, an international bestseller. He is known as the co-author of one of the most comprehensive anthologies of Armenian literature, The Heritage of Armenian Literature (3 vols., Wayne State University Press, 2000–2005).

Hacikyan was born in Istanbul to Armenian parents. After completing the first year of his engineering degree, Hacikyan left Turkey to study literature. He received his PhD in Montreal and lived in Quebec since 1957.

== Novels ==
- The Young Man in the Grey Suit (2013)
- My Ethnic Quest (2012)
- The Lamppost Diary (2009)
- Les rives du destin (2005)
- A Summer Without Dawn (2000)
- Un été sans aube (1991)
- The Battle of the Prophets (1981)
- Tomas (1970)
