= Mshak =

Mshak Մշակ
- Former editors: Grigor Artsruni (founder)
- Frequency: daily
- First issue: 1872
- Country: Russian Empire
- Based in: Tiflis, Tiflis Governorate
- Language: Armenian

Mshak (Armenian: Մշակ meaning The Toiler) was an Armenian language literary and political daily newspaper (weekly when established) published from 1872–1920 in Tiflis, Russian Empire (now Tbilisi, Georgia). It was founded by Grigor Artsruni.

Mshak was famous particularly for its serialization of notable Armenian literary works, such as Jalaleddin. Mshak was also known for its publication of liberal ideas, promoting the creation of a united Armenian state inside the Russia. In 1921, after the Soviet invasion of Georgia, Mshak, along with other anti-Bolshevik media, was closed.

== Editors ==
The following is the list of the editors of Mshak:

Editor	Years
Grigor Artsruni (founder)	1872–1892
Aleksandr Kalantar	1893–1913
Hambardzum Arakelian	1913–1918
Arshak Mkhitaryan
Hovhannes Stepanyan
Levon Kalantar
Arakel Babakhanian (Leo)	1918–1920

== See also ==
- Armenians in Tbilisi
- Armenian literature
