= Pekachuk =

Pekachuk پكاچوك
- Village
- Location within Iran
- Coordinates: 38°11′20″N 44°49′33″E
- Country: Iran
- Province: West Azerbaijan
- County: Salmas
- Bakhsh: Central
- Rural District: Koreh Soni

Population (2006)
  - Total: 228
- Time zone: UTC+3:30 (IRST)
  - Summer (DST): UTC+4:30 (IRDT)

Pekachuk (Persian: پكاچوك, also Romanized as Pekāchūk; also known as Pekājīk, Armenian: Փայաջուկ) is a village in Koreh Soni Rural District, in the Central District of Salmas County, West Azerbaijan Province, Iran. At the 2006 census, its population was 228, in 39 families.
