= Mikhail M. Diakonoff =

Soviet orientalist (1907–1954)

Mikhail Mikhailovich Diakonoff (25 June [O.S. 12 June] 1907 – 8 June 1954) was a Soviet orientalist and expert on Iranian studies. He was the older brother of Igor Mikhailovich Diakonoff, who was a Russian historian, linguist, translator, and expert on the Ancient Near East and its languages. His last name is occasionally spelled as Diakonov.

== Publications ==
His book, The Ancient History of Iran, translated by Rouhi Arbab into Persian, is one of Diakonov's significant works; it is about the history of Iran during ancient times. It was written in 1944–1945, and pre-publication copies of it were widely used by students and scholars at that time. However, the book was published only after his death. In 1954, the book was completed by his brother, Igor.
