= Raffi (novelist) =

19th-century Armenian author

Raffi Րաֆֆի
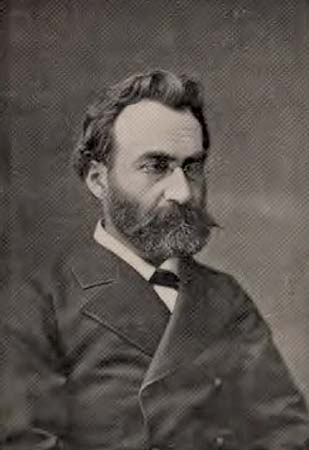
- Born: Hakob Melik–Hakobyan; 1835; Payajuk, Qajar Iran
- Died: April 25, 1888 (aged 52–53); Tiflis, Russian Empire (present-day Tbilisi, Georgia)
- Occupations: writer, poet, novelist, essayist
- Spouse: Anna Hormouz

Hakob Melik Hakobian (Armenian: Յակոբ Մելիք Յակոբեան (classical); 1835 – 25 April 1888), better known by his pen name Raffi (Armenian: Րաֆֆի), was an Armenian author and leading figure in 19th-century Armenian literature. He is considered one of the most influential and popular modern Armenian authors. His works, especially his historical novels, played an important role in the development of modern Armenian nationalism. Ara Baliozian described him as Armenia's "greatest novelist of the 19th century."

== Biography ==
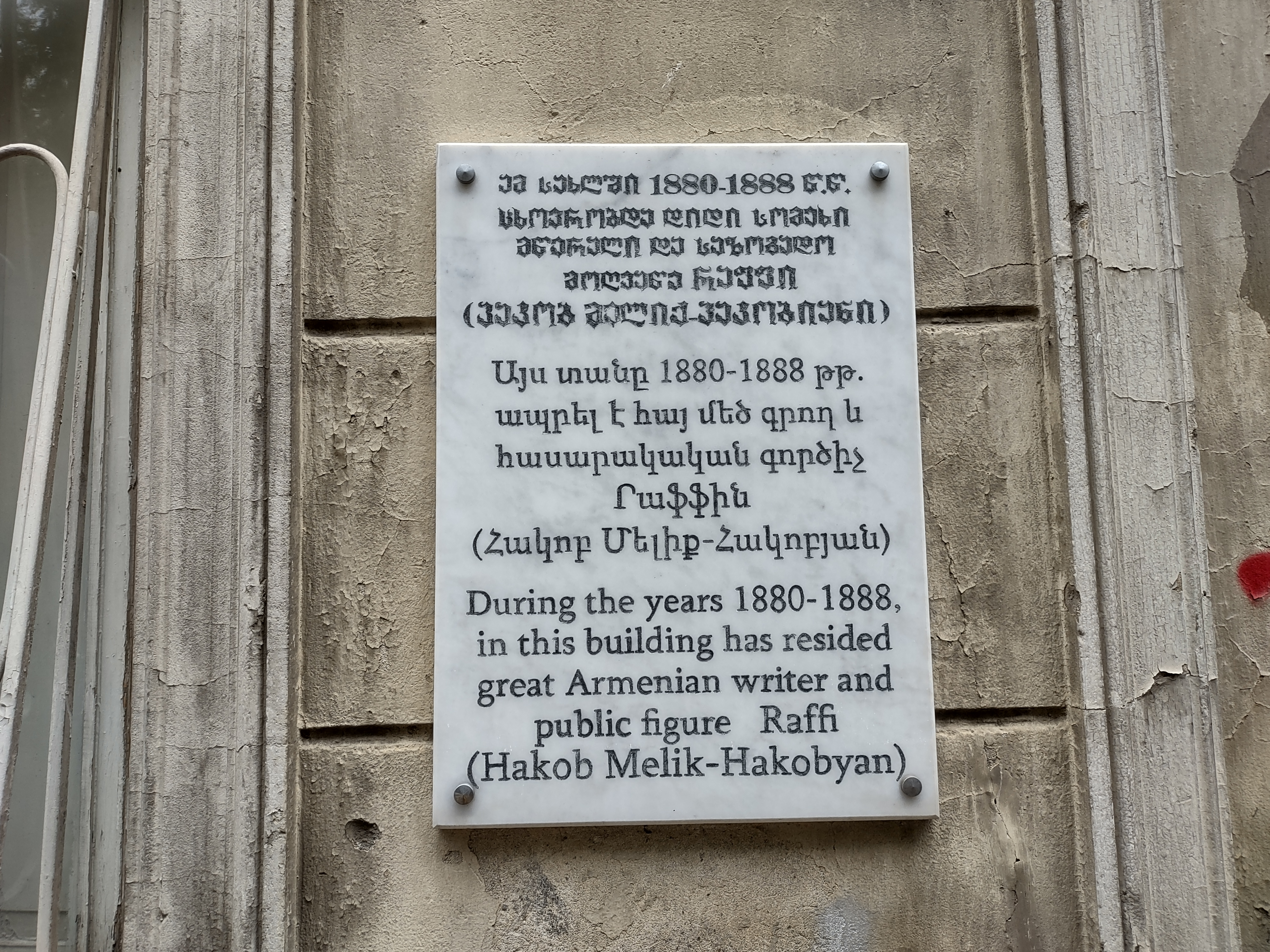
Chonkadze Str. 3 in Tbilisi, where Raffi lived from 1880 to 1888

Raffi was born in 1835 in the village of Payajuk in the district of Salmas in northwestern Iran. He was the eldest son of thirteen children in a family of hereditary Armenian gentry (meliks). His father, Melik Mirza, was a wealthy merchant. He began his education at a local school run by a priest, Father Teodik, whom he would later depict in his novel Kaytser ("Sparks"). At the age of 12, his father sent him to Tiflis (Tbilisi), at that time a major center of Armenian intellectual life, to continue his secondary education at a boarding school run by Armenian teacher Karapet Belakhyants. In 1852, he enrolled in the Russian state gymnasium in Tiflis. During his four years of study there, Raffi was introduced to Russian and other European authors that would influence him, such as Schiller and Victor Hugo, whose works he read through Russian publications and Armenian translations by the Mekhitarists.

Raffi was unable to continue his education due to his family's financial difficulties and left the gymnasium without graduating. He returned to his native village in 1856 to help with the family business. In 1857–58, he traveled extensively throughout the Armenian-populated provinces of Iran and the Ottoman Empire, collecting information about the conditions of life in Armenian villages, the geography of the region, and the historical memory of the population. He journeyed to Taron, Van, Aghtamar, and Varagavank, where he met the future Catholicos of All Armenians Mkrtich Khrimian. During his travels, Raffi saw firsthand the oppression of the Armenian peasants and the corruption of their leaders. The information and impressions that Raffi received during his travels later served as material for his literary works.

Raffi began his writing career in 1860, publishing his first work in the newspaper Hyusisap’ayl ("Aurora Borealis"). Raffi married Anna Hormouz, an Assyrian woman, in 1863 and moved to Tiflis in 1868. Around this time, Raffi was forced to take control of the failing family business, but was unable to save it from bankruptcy. Raffi was frequently in a dire financial situation and wrote constantly to support his wife and two children, as well as his mother and many sisters. Raffi's situation somewhat improved after 1872, when he was invited by Grigor Artsruni to join the staff of the newspaper Mshak ("Tiller"), where his novels were first serialized. He soon became the most popular and active writer for Mshak, gaining widespread recognition for his fresh ideas, his addressal of the pressing issues of contemporary Armenian life, his refined language and his vivid style. Besides his works of fiction, Raffi also wrote travelogues and articles. It was at this time that he began using the pen name Raffi, from the Arabic name. Raffi also worked for a few years as a teacher at Armenian schools in Tabriz (1875–77) and Agulis (1877–79), but was unable to continue in this role due to opposition from conservatives to his novel Harem, where he criticized traditional eastern society. Raffi returned to Tiflis, where he remained for the rest of his life and wrote full-time. In 1884, he fell out with Grigor Artsruni and began writing for the weekly Ardzagank’ ("Echo") instead.

Raffi died on 25 April 1888 in Tiflis. His funeral procession was attended by thousands of people. He was buried in the cemetery of the Holy Mother of God Armenian Church, now the Khojivank Pantheon of Tbilisi, where Hovhannes Tumanyan, Gabriel Sundukian, Ghazaros Aghayan and Grigor Artsruni are also buried. Raffi's widow Anna and two sons, Aram and Arshak, later emigrated to London.

== Views ==
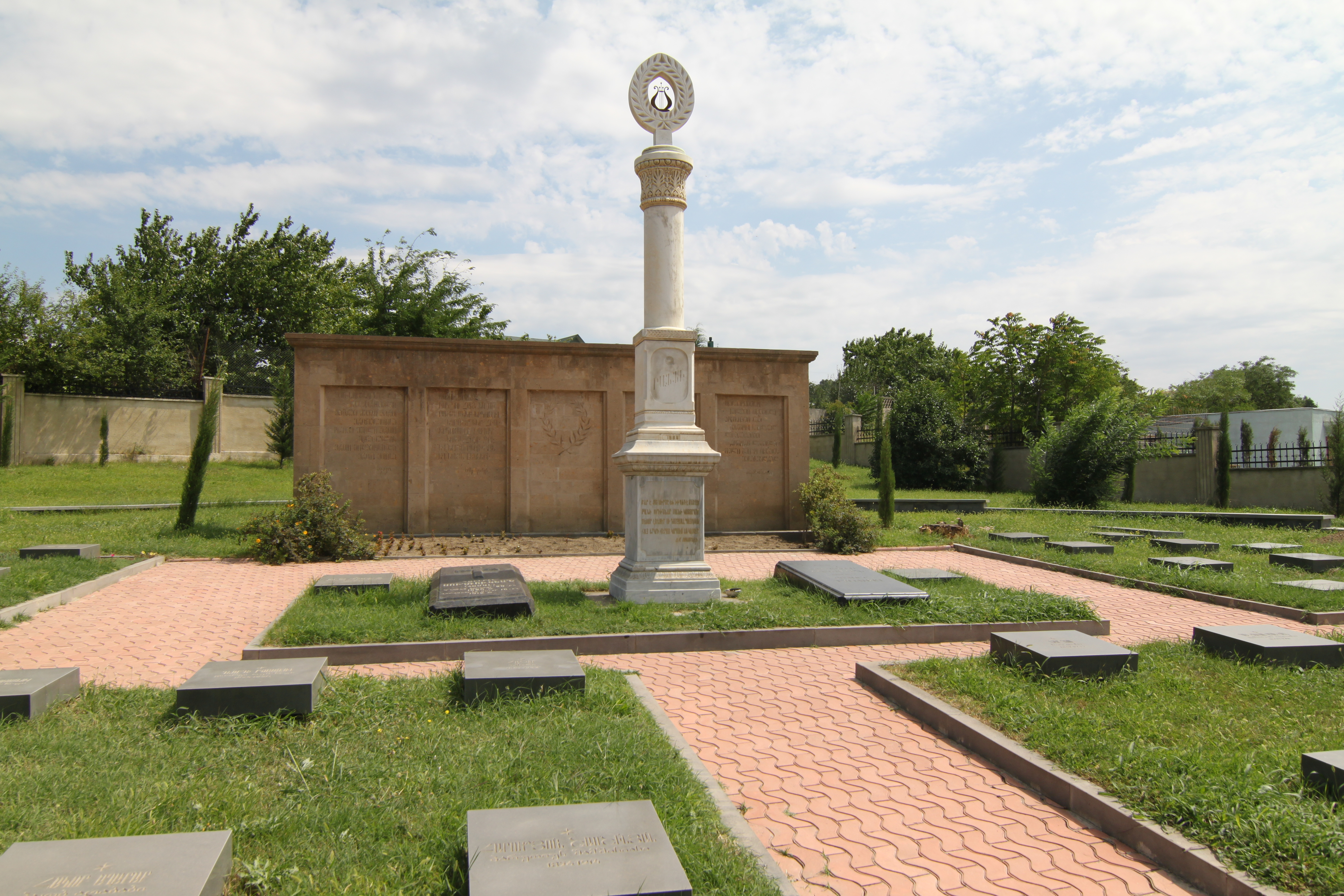
Tombstone of Raffi at the Armenian Pantheon of Tbilisi

Raffi was a romantic nationalist who regarded patriotism and defense of the homeland to be the duties of every individual. His works emphasize the concept of national unity and seek to enlighten people and fill them with patriotic feeling. Like his predecessor Khachatur Abovian, Raffi desired the unity of the Armenians of Iran, Russia and the Ottoman Empire in a struggle against foreign domination. He never openly called for armed revolution, but he promoted armed self-defense "as the most dignified and legitimate human right."

Raffi viewed a person's behavior and character as the product of their environment and conditions of life. He saw education and enlightenment as the most important tools for progress and the reformation of society. In a dream seen by the protagonist of his novel The Fool, he envisions a future Armenia as a united, peaceful, independent country with a representative government and socialization of key industries, where the Armenians' neighbors, the Kurds, have been "civilized and assimilated."

Raffi disapproved of all religions and saw Christianity in particular as a "passive" religion that had left the Armenian nation weak and defenseless. Through one of the characters of his novella Jalaleddin, he lamented that Armenians had used their resources on monasteries and churches instead of fortresses and weapons. He was extremely critical of the clergy, whom he represents as obscurantist and parasitical in his works. He was also critical of those who stoked inter-confessional divisions between Apostolic and Catholic Armenians. He advocated for a secular conception of Armenian nationhood on the basis of language and common descent rather than religion.

== Influence and legacy ==
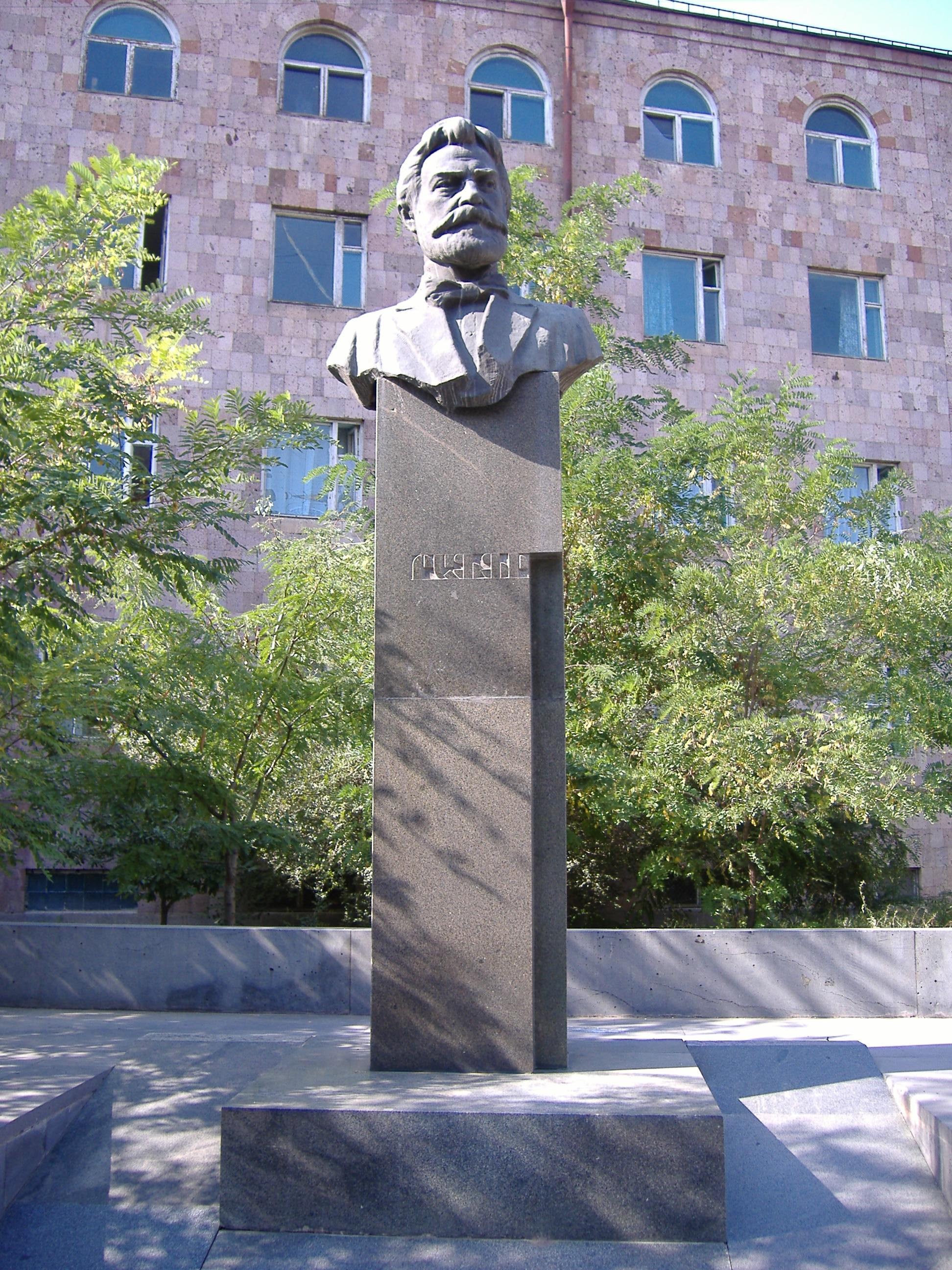
Monument to Raffi in Yerevan at the school named after him

The impact of Raffi's widely read patriotic works was powerful and immediate. The typist for Raffi's novel The Fool is said to have gone to become a partisan in Ottoman Armenia immediately after completing his task. According to Vahé Oshagan, Raffi became the "ideological father of the Armenian revolutionary movements" who applied "the ideas of enlightenment and political awakening" to Armenians, while Louise Nalbandian writes that Raffi's works "served as a guide for organized revolutionary action." Although Raffi called for self-defense rather than armed revolution, his works, like those of Mikayel Nalbandian and others, served as inspiration for the Armenian revolutionary parties.

Raffi's works had a lasting influence on major Armenian figures of all political stripes. Simon Vratsian, a prominent leader of the First Republic of Armenia, recalled in his memoirs that he joined the Armenian Revolutionary Federation as a teenager partly because he believed that Raffi had been a member of the party (Raffi died a few years before the founding of the ARF). Anastas Mikoyan was also greatly inspired by Raffi's novels, which he read as a student at the Nersisian School in Tiflis. In his speech in Yerevan of March 1954, Mikoyan called for reviving the legacy of Raffi, alongside Raphael Patkanian, Yeghishe Charents, and Alexander Miasnikian, beginning the Khrushchev Thaw in Soviet Armenia.

A school in Yerevan is named after Raffi. There are also streets named after the writer in Yerevan, Ashtarak, Stepanavan, Yeghvard, Artik, Getazat and Nshavan. There was a street named after Raffi in Stepanakert.

== Selected works ==
- Salbi (Սալբի, written 1855–1874, published posthumously 1911)
- Harem (Հարեմ, first part published in 1874, second part published posthumously in 1891); English translation: Harem (2020)
- Jalaleddin (Ջալալէդդին, serialized 1878, separate publication 1884); English translations: Jelaleddin (1906), Jalaleddin (2006), Jalaleddin: A Portrayal of His Incursion (2019)
- Khent’ë (Խենթը, serialized 1880, separate publication 1881); English translations: The Fool (1950, 2000, 2020)
- Davit Bek (Դաւիթ Բէկ, serialized 1880–81, separate publication in 1882)
- Khamsayi melikut’yunner (Խամսայի մելիքութիւններ (The Khamsa Melikdoms), 1882); English translation: The Five Melikdoms of Karabagh (2010) – a non-fiction work about the history of the Melikdoms of Karabakh
- Voski ak’aghagh (Ոսկի աքաղաղ, serialized 1879, separate publication 1882); English translations: The Golden Rooster (1908–09, 2008)
- Khach’agoghi hishatakaranë (Խաչագողի յիշատակարանը (The Diary of a Cross-Stealer), 1883–84)
- Kaytser (Կայծեր, (Sparks), 2 vols., 1883–1887); English translation: Fire-Sparks (1893–94)
- Samvel (Սամուէլ, serialized 1886–87, separate publication 1888); English translation: Samuel (1948–1951)

== See also ==
- Muratsan, Armenian novelist and contemporary of Raffi, known for his historical novels
- Tserents, Armenian novelist and contemporary of Raffi, known for his historical novels

== Bibliography ==
- Acharian, Hrachia (1948). "Ṛaffi". Hayotsʻ andznanunneri baṛaran [Dictionary of Armenian given names] (in Armenian). Vol. IV. Yerevan: Petakan hamalsarani hratarakchʻutʻyun. pp. 315.
- Aslanian, Sebouh (2002). "Dispersion History and the Polycentric Nation: The Role of Simeon Yerevantsiʼs Girk or koči partavčar in the 18th century National Revival". Bazmavēp. 160 (1–4): 5–81.
- Baliozian, Ara (1980). The Armenians: Their History & Culture. New York: AGBU Ararat Press. ISBN 0-933706-21-9.
- Bardakjian, Kevork B. (2000). A Reference Guide to Modern Armenian Literature, 1500–1920: With an Introductory History. Wayne State University Press. ISBN 9780814327470.
- Grigoryan, Vardan (8 August 2015). "Raffii knoj ev ordineri masin" [About Raffi's wife and sons]. Alikonline.ir (in Armenian). Archived from the original on 25 February 2023.
- Hacikyan, Agop Jack; Basmajian, Gabriel; Franchuk, Edward S.; Ouzounian, Nourhan (2005). The Heritage of Armenian Literature: From the Eighteenth Century to Modern Times. Detroit, Michigan: Wayne State University Press. ISBN 0-8143-3221-8.
- Hovannisian, Richard G. (1969). "Simon Vratzian and Armenian Nationalism". Middle Eastern Studies. 5 (3): 192–220. doi:10.1080/00263206908700129. JSTOR 4282291.
- Nalbandian, Louise (1975). The Armenian Revolutionary Movement (3rd reprint ed.). Berkeley: University of California Press. ISBN 0-520-00914-2.
- Panossian, Razmik (2006). The Armenians: From Kings and Priests to Merchants and Commissars. New York: Columbia University Press. ISBN 9780231139267.
- Petrosyan, Eghishe (1959). Raffi: kyankʻě ev gortsuneutʻyuně [Raffi: life and work] (PDF) (in Armenian). Yerevan: Haypethrat. OCLC 573656871.
- Raffi (1962a). Erkeri zhoghovatsu [Collected works]. Vol. 1. Yerevan: Haypethrat.
- ——— (1962b). Erkeri zhoghovatsu [Collected works]. Vol. 3. Yerevan: Haypethrat.
- ——— (1963). Erkeri zhoghovatsu [Collected works]. Vol. 6. Yerevan: Haypethrat.
- ——— (1964). Erkeri zhoghovatsu [Collected works]. Vol. 10. Yerevan: Haypethrat.
- ——— (2006). Jalaleddin. Translated by Abcarian, Donald. London: Taderon Press. ISBN 978-1-903656-62-4.
- ——— (2019). Jalaleddin: A Portrayal of His Incursion. Translated by McFarlane, Kimberley; Miloyan, Beyon. Sophene Books. ISBN 978-1-925937-00-8.
- ——— (7 July 2020). Harem. Translated by McFarlane, Kimberley; Miloyan, Beyon. Sophene Books. ISBN 978-1-925937-29-9.
- ——— (2010). The Five Melikdoms of Karabagh (1600–1827). Translated by Melkonian, Ara Stepan. London: Taderon Press. ISBN 978-1-903656-57-0.
- ——— (2000). The Fool. Translated by Abcarian, Donald. Princeton, N.J.: Gomidas Institute. ISBN 978-0-953519-18-7.
- ——— (17 November 2020). The Fool. Translated by McFarlane, Kimberley; Miloyan, Beyon. Sophene Books. ISBN 978-1-925937-40-4.
- ——— (2008). The Golden Rooster. Translated by Abcarian, Donald. London: Taderon Press. ISBN 978-1-903656-77-8.
- Sarinian, S. (1986). "Raffi". In Arzumanian, Makich (ed.). Haykakan sovetakan hanragitaran [Armenian Soviet Encyclopedia] (in Armenian). Vol. 12. Yerevan. pp. 135–136.
- Shakarian, Pietro A. (2025). Anastas Mikoyan: An Armenian Reformer in Khrushchev's Kremlin. Bloomington: Indiana University Press. ISBN 978-0253073556.
