= M. Salpi =

Armenian writer and doctor

Aram Sahakian (Արամ Մ․ Աահակյան; born Kayseri, 1884 - Constanța, 1968) better known by the penname M. Salpi (Սալբի) was an Armenian writer and doctor. Sahakian served as a medical officer in the Ottoman army during the World War I, and then as resident doctor at the Armenian refugee camp in Port Said, Egypt. Sahakian began collecting the stories of Armenian soldiers and refugees following the deportations and massacres of their communities. He was best known for Our Cross (Armenian: «Մեր խաչը» Mer Khachu), a collection of short stories originally printed in 1921 in Paris, subsequently published in English in Los Angeles. Among his other works is Patgamavor shunery («Պատգամավոր շուները» 1945).
