= Salpi (novel) =

1874 novel by Raffi

- Author: Raffi
- Original title: (Սալբի Salpy)
- Language: Armenian
- Genre: Novel
- Publication date: 1874
- Publication place: Armenia
- Media type: Print

Salbi (Սալբի Salpy) is an Armenian language novel by the novelist Raffi. Although his earliest novel, written 1855-1874, it was not published until 1911.

== General Description ==
The ideological essence of the novel "Salbi" is the issue of national liberation. According to the author, Rustam, the novel's hero, who rebels against the dictatorship, is the birth of free nature and unfair human life. Rustam and Salbu, the image of a leading Armenian woman, are opposed by the Armenian clergy, merchants, and the humble servants of the Persian khans, ter-Maruk, ter-Markos, Solomon-bek Avazakyants, and others. All these are allied with the Persian feudal-barbarian power by their class nature and enjoy its patronage.

The novel "Salbi" is a romantic work. In it, the characters are built with the absolute contrast of positive and negative, internal and external features. The plot situations of the novel are also romantic; they are exceptional, supernatural, and shrouded in mythical mystery. Actions in the novel are dynamic. The author's imagination has given birth to lively scenes, which are given with lavish descriptions.
