= The Fool (novel) =

1880 novel by Raffi

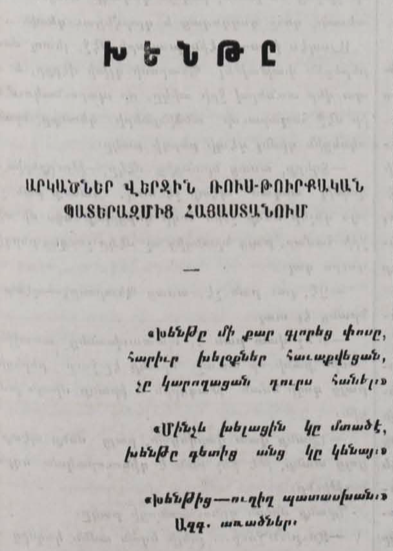
- Author: Raffi
- Original title: Խենթը
- Translator: Jane S. Wingate
- Language: Armenian
- Genre: Historical fiction
- Publisher: Shusha: Mirzajan Mahtesi-Hakobiants (Armenian 1st ed.); Boston: Baikar Press (English 1st. ed)
- Publication date: 1881
- Publication place: Russian Empire
- English publication date: 1950
- Pages: ii+400 (Armenian 1st ed.); 361 (English 1st ed.)
- OCLC: 9588669
- Original text: Խենթը at Armenian Wikisource

The Fool (Armenian: Խենթը, Khent’ë, Armenian pronunciation: [χɛntʰə]) is an 1880 Armenian-language novel by the Armenian writer Raffi, one of the best-known novels by one of Armenia's greatest novelists. Set during the Russo-Turkish War of 1877–78, the plot tells a romance set against the background of the divided Armenian nation.

== Publication ==
The novel was first serialized in the Tiflis newspaper Mshak in 1880, then published as a separate edition in Shusha in 1881.

== Setting and structure ==
The novel is set in three districts near the border between the Russian and Ottoman Empires: Bayazit, Alashkert, and Vagharshapat.

The novel opens with four fast-paced chapters describing the Turkish siege of Bayazit, a historic episode from the last Russo-Turkish war. After a harrowing depiction of the battle, its outcome is left in suspense as chapter five suddenly shifts the focus to an earlier time to tell the story of a village in Alashkert and a romance caught in the treacherous sociopolitical crosscurrents of the war. The succeeding twenty-nine chapters present a rich ethnographic account of country life in this particular region of Western Armenia, while depicting the ideological themes that dominated Armenian life at the time through a set of powerful, competing actors. The novel concludes in Vagharshapat (Etchmiadzin).

== Translations ==
The Fool has been translated into English three times: by Jane Wingate in 1950; by Donald Abcarian in 2000; and by Kimberley McFarlane and Beyon Miloyan in 2020. It has been translated into French, Russian (twice), Spanish, and other languages.
