= Jalaleddin (novella) =

Book by Raffi

- Author: Raffi
- Original title: Ջալալէդդին (Մի Պատկեր նրա Արշաւանքից)
- Language: Armenian
- Genre: Historical fiction
- Publisher: Mshak
- Publication date: 1878

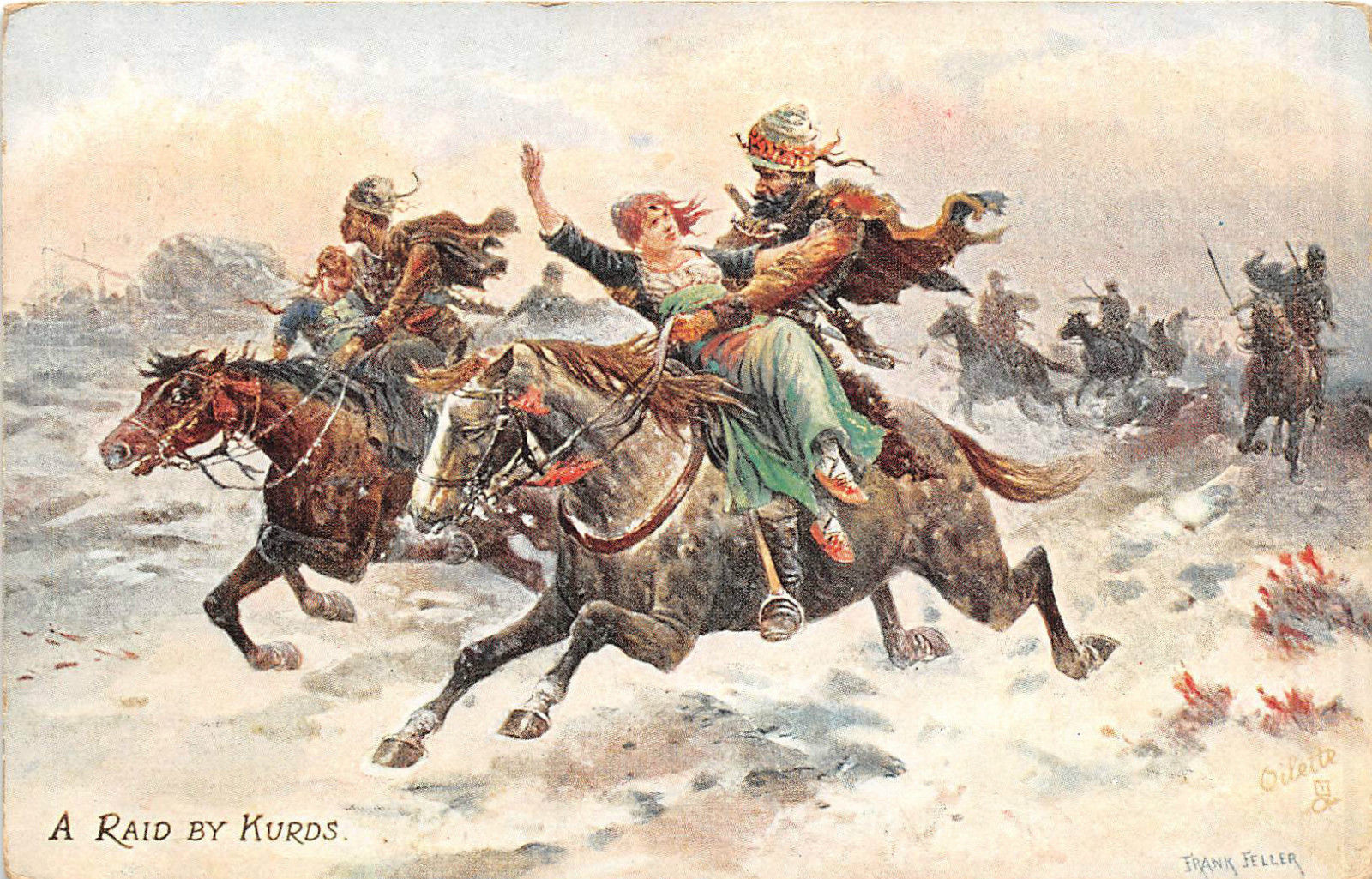
By Frank Feller

Jalaleddin (Armenian: Ջալալէդդին) was the first of the Armenian writer Raffi's famous works of historical fiction and a milestone in modern Armenian literature. The novella was first published in serialized form across eight issues of Mshak, a Tiflis-based Armenian newspaper, in 1878 (exactly one year after the events depicted). Its title is based on the name of Sheikh Jalaleddin, a Kurdish chief who led his forces on a violent campaign against Armenian and Assyrian villages in the eastern part of Van province at the beginning of the last Russo-Turkish War (1877–78). While the story is fictional, Raffi based the historical details on eyewitness accounts. Much of the key historical information provided by Raffi corresponds with British correspondents who were in the Eastern Ottoman Empire at the time.

== Synopsis ==
The events of the story take place in the eastern part of the Van Vilayet, in the historical canton of Aghbak near the Ottoman frontier with Persia. The novella tells the story of Sarhat, a young Armenian man who lives the life of a bandit and seeks to rescue his beloved, Asli, from marauding Kurds under the leadership of the eponymous Sheikh Jalaleddin.

== Translations ==
=== French translation ===
The first translation of Jalaleddin was completed in French by Arshag Tchobanian (published as Djelaleddin), appearing between 1896 and 1897 in Revue des revues across five issues.

=== Russian translation ===
A Russian translation by N. Bogaturova was published in 1911.

=== English translations ===
K. Andreassian (1906).

Donald Abcarian (2006).

Beyon Miloyan and Kimberley McFarlane (2019).
