= Grigor Artsruni =

Armenian journalist, critic, writer and activist

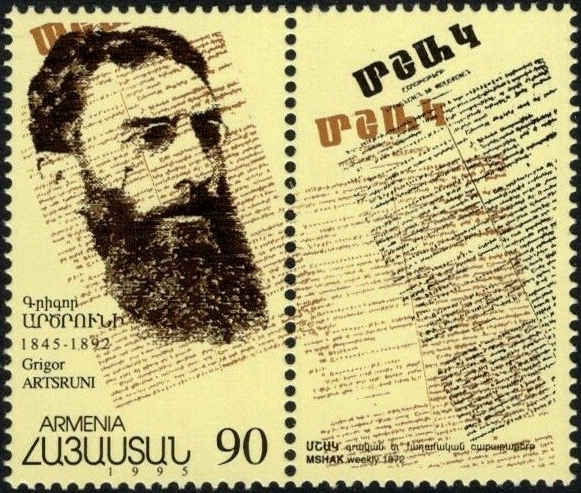
Grigor Artsuni on a stamp from Armenia

Grigor Artsruni (also spelled as Krikor Ardzruni, Armenian: Գրիգոր Արծրունի; 27 February 1845 – 19 December 1892) was an Armenian journalist, critic, writer and public activist. In 1872, he began publishing the newspaper Mshak and remained its editor and manager until his death.

He studied at the universities of Moscow and Saint Petersburg, then studied Armenian at the Mekhitarists' centers in Europe (Vienna and San Lazzaro, Venice). He graduated from Heidelberg University in 1869, receiving the degree of Doctor of Political Economy and Philosophy. In 1872, he established and edited Mshak ('Cultivator' or 'Toiler'), the basis of Armenian liberalism. Artsruni believed in the necessity of development of capitalism in Armenia and supported the idea of armed resistance as a solution for the Armenian question. Artsruni was a mentor to the Armenian writer Raffi (1835–1888).

== Life ==
Grigor Artsruni was born in Moscow on 27 February 1845. His father Yeremia was an officer in the Russian army who later served as mayor of Tiflis. Grigor's paternal ancestors, the Yeran-Artsrunis, were a notable family in Van in Ottoman Armenia who claimed descent from the ancient noble house of Artsruni. Grigor's paternal grandfather, Gevorg Agha Yeran-Artsruni, migrated to Tiflis in the Russian Empire in 1813. Grigor attended the Russian gymnasium in Tiflis from 1858 to 1863. He spoke only Russian and French until his early teenage years and only began to study Armenian when he entered the Tiflis gymnasium. After graduating from the gymnasium, he studied at the universities of Moscow and Saint Petersburg. In 1867, he was accepted to Heidelberg University. He graduated in 1869, receiving the degree of Doctor of Political Economy and Philosophy. After this, he spent some time traveling around Europe and visited the seminaries of the Mekhitarist Order in Venice and Vienna. He moved back to Tiflis in 1871 and worked as a teacher. He spent the rest of his life in Tiflis, except for another one-year trip to Europe in 1885.

== Career ==
Artsruni's journalistic career began in his student years, when he sent reports from Europe to various Armenian journals in Tiflis. Most of his writings dealt with the issue of the modernization of Armenian society and culture. He also wrote on philosophical subjects and life in Europe. In 1872, he established the newspaper Mshak ('Cultivator' or 'Toiler'), which, as Lisa Khachaturian notes, he intended to be "a central unifying organ that would enlighten, entertain, and coordinate the concerns of Armenians and other ethnic groups inhabiting the Caucasus, while also covering Europe and the Russian Empire." The newspaper reflected Artsruni's liberal and pro-Russian views. Mshak's low price allowed it to reach a broader audience, and it had higher circulation numbers and a much longer lifespan than most other Armenian publications. It continued publication after Artsruni's death and lasted until 1921, a total of forty-nine years. Besides his journalistic and publishing activities, Artsruni also wrote memoirs, a novel (Evelina, 1891), short stories, essays, feuilletons, and other kinds of works. He was also an active literary critic.

== Views ==
Artsruni was one of the major figures of nineteenth-century Armenian liberalism. He supported a number of liberal reforms, such as the guaranteeing of freedom of the press and conscience, the separation of Church and state, regulation of the wage system and working day, improvement of housing conditions for workers, and the establishment of national educational institutions and commercial arbitrage courts. He stressed the importance of science and education to improve society and produce "young people capable of practical work." He supported free, coeducational education and the emancipation of women. His economic views were characterized by a support for the development of industrial capitalism in Armenia, with protections against the influx of foreign capital and the extension of credit to peasants to prevent mass migration from the countryside to the cities. He considered the work of capitalists, workers and intellectuals to be of equal value to society. He opposed attempts to transform society by revolutionary means. Like other progressive intellectuals of his time, he advocated for an Armenian national identity independent of belonging to the Armenian Apostolic Church. Regarding the Armenian question, he saw cooperation with Russia, as well as armed rebellion, as the main means for the liberation of the Ottoman Armenians.

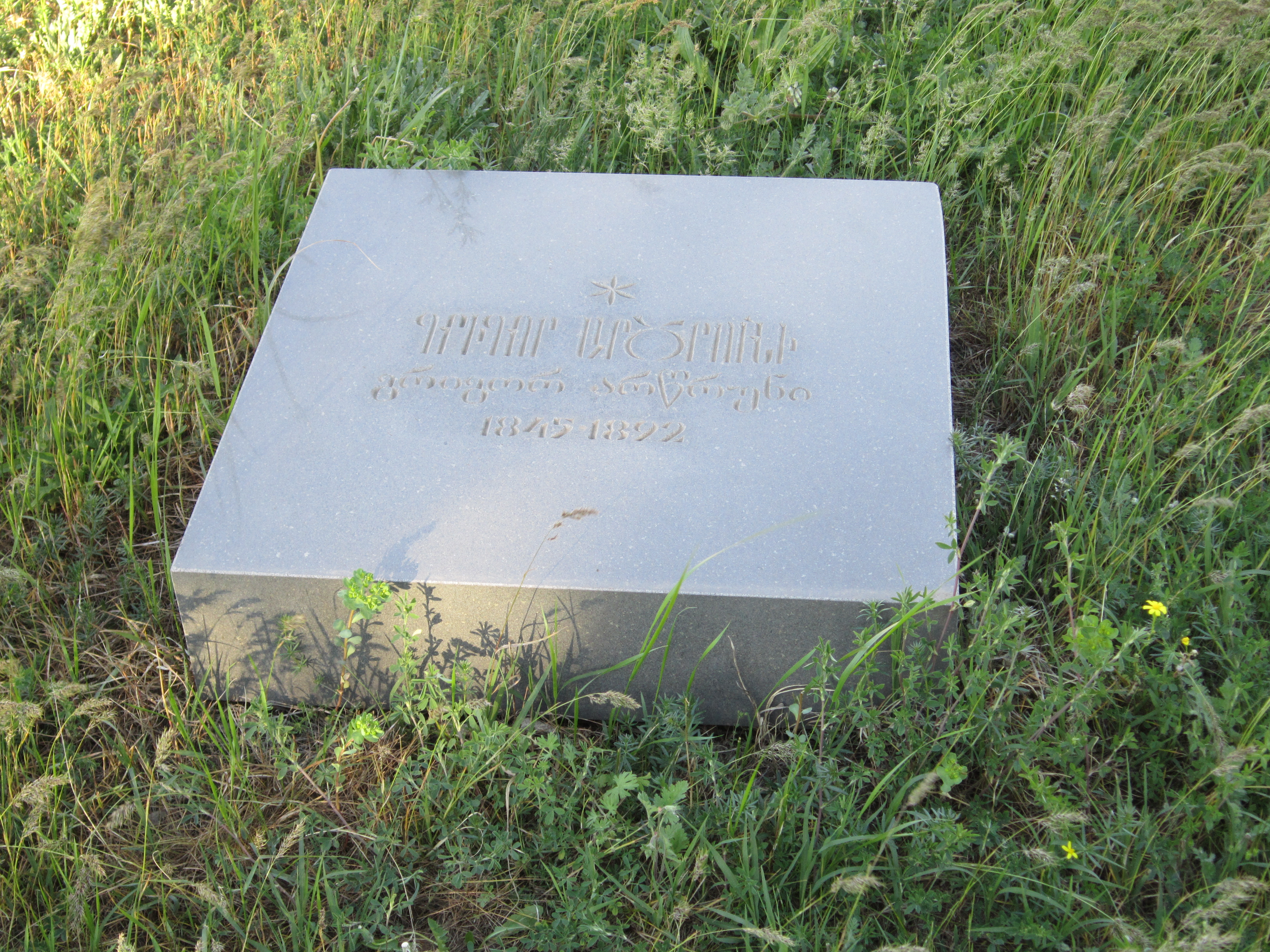
The tombstone of Grigor Artsruni in Khojivank

== Selected works ==
- (1876) Vostochnyĭ vopros Восточный вопрос [The Eastern question] (in Russian). Tiflis: I. A. Chantsev.
- (1891) Ēvelina: Hogebanakan etiwd Էվէլինա․ Հոգեբանական էտիւդ [Evelina: psychological study]. Tiflis: Tp. Arōr. (Novel. Read online.)
- (1894) Tʻiwrkʻatsʻ hayeri tntesakan drutʻiwně Թիւրքաց հայերի տնտեսական դրութիւնը [Economic situation of the Turkish Armenians]. Tiflis: Tp. M. Martiroseantsʻi. (Read online.)
- (1904) Grigor Artsrunu ashkhatutʻiwnnerě Գրիգոր Արծրունու աշխատութիւնները [Grigor Artsruni's works]. Vol. 1. Tiflis: Hratarakchʻutʻiwn Mshaki khmbagrutʻean. (Read online.)
