= Nalbandian =

Origin
- Region of origin: Armenia, Iran

Nalbandian or Nalbandyan (Armenian: Նալբանդյան; Western Armenian: Նալպանտեան, Persian: نعلبندیان) is an Armenian surname that derives from նալբանդ, nalband, 'one who makes horseshoes', which is of Persian origin.

Nalbandian may refer to:

== People ==
=== Nalbandian ===
- Abbas Nalbandian (1947–1987), Iranian playwright
- Armen Nalbandian (born 1978), American Jazz pianist/composer
- David Nalbandian (born 1982), Argentine tennis player
- Edward Nalbandian (1927–2006), Armenian-American businessman, owner of Zachary All Clothing
- John B. Nalbandian (born 1969), Armenian-American/Japanese-American lawyer and judge
- Joseph Nalbandian (1919–after 1985), Lebanese Armenian football player and manager
- Louise Nalbandian, Armenian-American historian and professor
- Maria Nalbandian (born 1985), Lebanese Armenian singer
- Mikayel Nalbandian (1829–1866), Armenian writer, poet, political theorist and activist
- Tigran Nalbandian (1975–2025), Armenian chess grandmaster

=== Nalbandyan ===
- Aleksan Nalbandyan (born 1971), Armenian and Russian amateur boxer
- Aram Nalbandyan (1908 – 1987), Soviet physicist
- Dmitry Nalbandyan (1906 – 1993), Georgian-Armenian painter
- Eduard Nalbandyan (born 1956), Armenian politician, Minister of Foreign Affairs
- Suren Nalbandyan (born 1956), Soviet wrestler

== Places ==
- Nalbandyan, a town in Armenia
