= Mikayel Nalbandian =

Armenian writer and revolutionary (1829–1866)

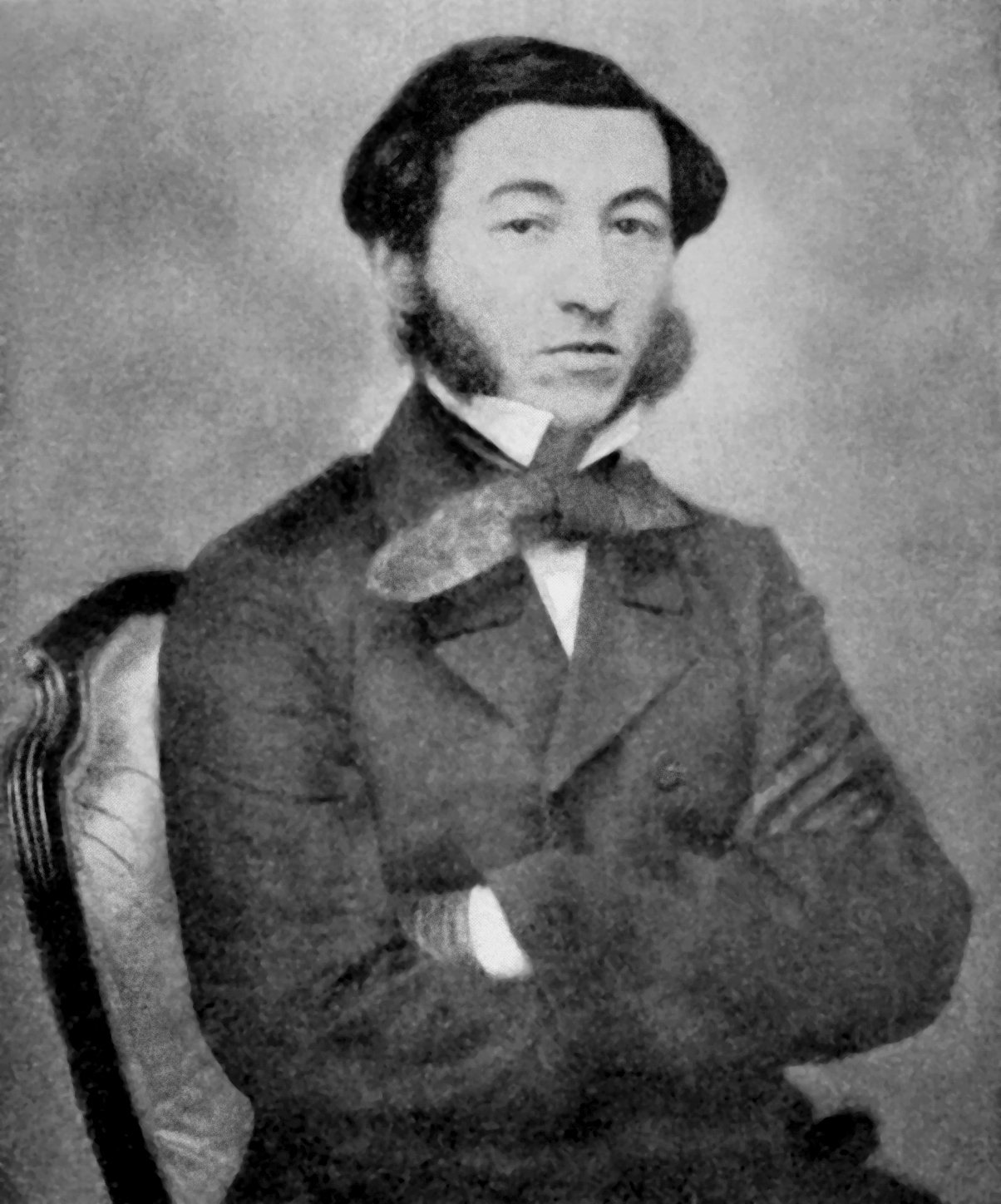
- Born: 14 November [O.S. 2 November] 1829; Nakhichevan-on-Don, Don Host Oblast, Russian Empire
- Died: 12 April [O.S. 31 March] 1866 (aged 36); Kamyshin, Saratov Governorate, Russia
- Resting place: Holy Cross Armenian Church, Rostov-on-Don
- Education: Moscow University (auditing student); Saint Petersburg University (doctorate)
- Occupations: Poet; writer; translator; political activist
- Writing career
- Language: Modern Eastern Armenian
- Years active: 1851–1866
- Genres: Poems; novels; essays; articles
- Subjects: Philosophy; religion; linguistics; political economy; education, literary criticism
- Notable works: "Freedom"; "Mer Hayrenik"
- Movement: Realism

Signature
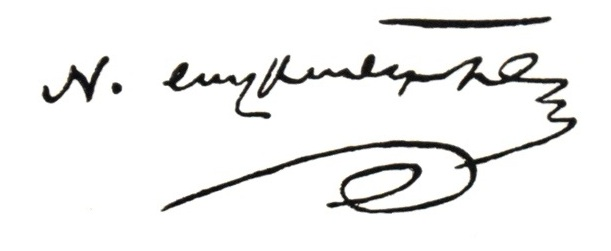

Mikayel Nalbandian (Note: Alternative spellings: Mikael, Nalbandyan, Nalpantian. He was known as Mikayel Nalbandiants (Միքայէլ Նալբանդեանց) during his lifetime. In Russian, he signed his letters in a Russified version of his name: Mikhail Nalbandov (Михаил Налбандов, pre-reform spelling: Михаилъ Налбандовъ). Sometimes anglicized as Michael.) (Armenian: Միքայել Նալբանդյան; 14 November [O.S. 2 November] 1829 – 12 April [O.S. 31 March] 1866) was a Russian Armenian writer, poet, political theorist and revolutionary.

Nalbandian was born in Nakhichevan-on-Don, an Armenian town in southern Russia, and traveled extensively, although he visited Armenia itself only once. A radical intellectual, Nalbandian was an avid advocate of secularism and anti-clericalism, the use of modern Armenian (as opposed to classical Armenian) and a vocal critic of the conservative clergy of the Armenian Apostolic Church. He also espoused anti-Catholicism. Inspired by the Enlightenment and the Italian unification, Nalbandian advocated reform, cultural nationalism and agrarianism among Armenians. In his later years he was influenced by Russian radicals such as Alexander Herzen and Nikolay Chernyshevsky. For his association with them, he was persecuted and died in exile at 37.

A champion of modernism, he is seen as a follower of Khachatur Abovian. In turn, he influenced many others, including the novelist Raffi, Armenian nationalist revolutionaries (especially the Dashnaks), and Armenian Marxists, such as Alexander Miasnikian. Nalbandian was widely revered in Soviet Armenia, while Dashnaks adopted "Mer Hayrenik", based on his poem "The Song of an Italian Girl", as the anthem of the First Republic of Armenia in 1918. It was re-adopted by independent Armenia in 1991. Another poem by Nalbandian, glorifying freedom, has become a celebrated anthem since it was written in 1859.

== Life ==
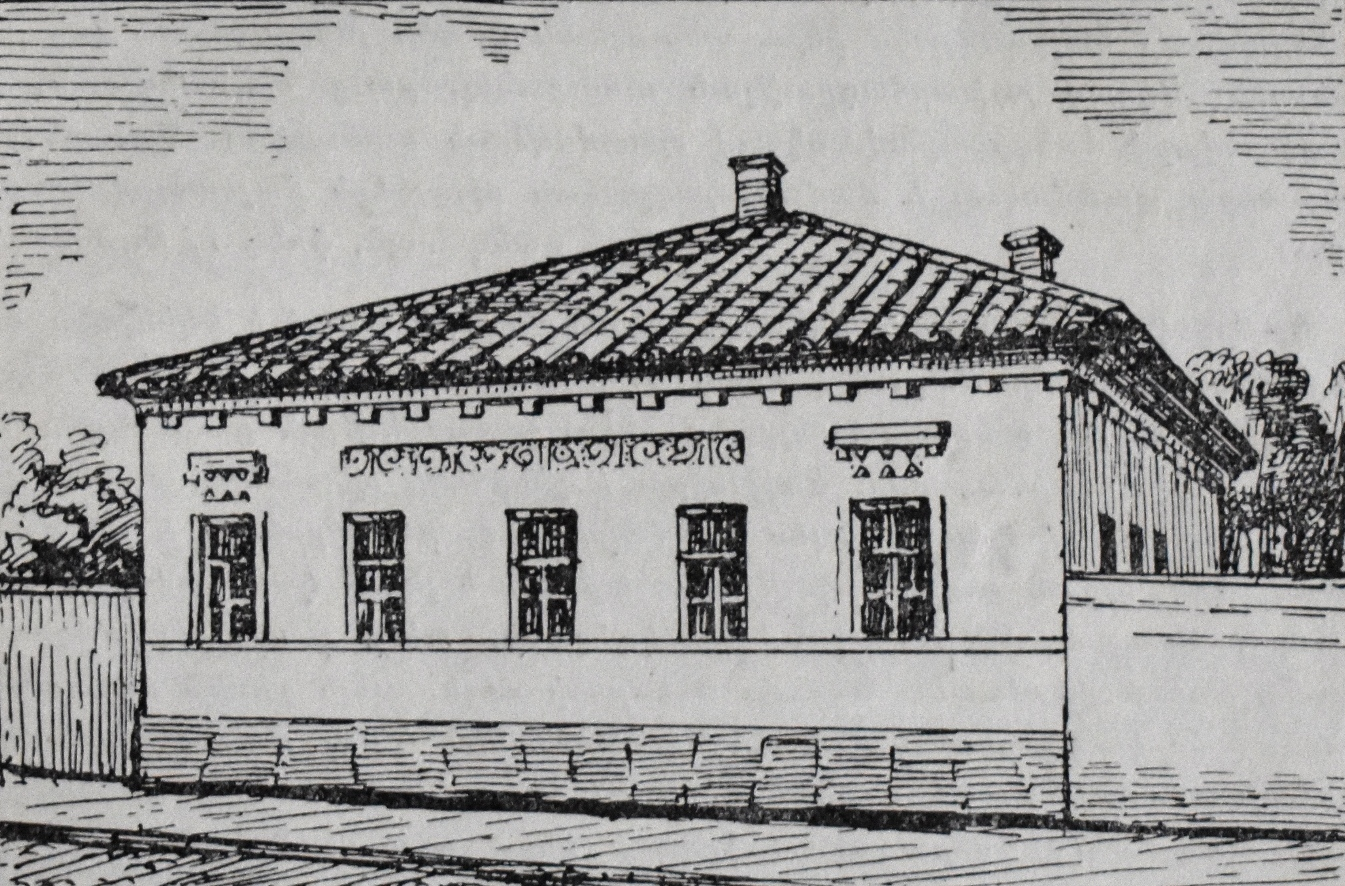
The house of the Nalbandian family in New Nakhichevan

=== Early years ===
Mikayel Nalbandian was born on 14 November (2 November in Old Style), (Note: Nalbandian was more likely born on 26 October (7 November in the New Style) and baptized on 2/14 November. However, the latter date is widely used in scholarly literature as his birthdate.) 1829 in Nakhichevan-on-Don (New Nakhichevan), an Armenian-populated town near Rostov-on-Don founded by Crimean Armenians in 1779, after they were relocated by Catherine the Great. His father, Ghazar (or Lazar, d. 1864), and earlier ancestors were farriers (and/or blacksmiths), from which they got their last name, which originates from Persian nalband. He first studied, from 1837 to 1845, at the private school of Father Gabriel Patkanian, a pioneer of modern Armenian education. He was taught Russian and French and was exposed to Western literature and science. Patkanian's school was shut down by Catholicos Nerses Ashtaraketsi in October 1845. Nerses and Harutiun Khalibian, the pro-clerical mayor of Nakhichevan, believed Patkanian went too far by promoting secular subjects at his school.

From July 1848 to July 1853 Nalbandian worked as the secretary of Archbishop Matteos Vehapetian, the primate of the diocese of New Nakhichevan and Bessarabia, seated in Kishinev, in modern Moldova. During those years he was mostly based in Kishinev, but regularly visited his hometown and Odessa, Kherson, and Crimea for health treatment. During this period, he was known as a dpir, a low rank in the Armenian Church akin to a clerk or deacon. For his liberal writings, he incurred the enmity of the church authorities. Catholicos Nerses developed an enmity towards Nalbandian for his alleged immoral writings. He was forced to flee Kishinev and New Nakhichevan to avoid religious persecution.

=== Moscow ===
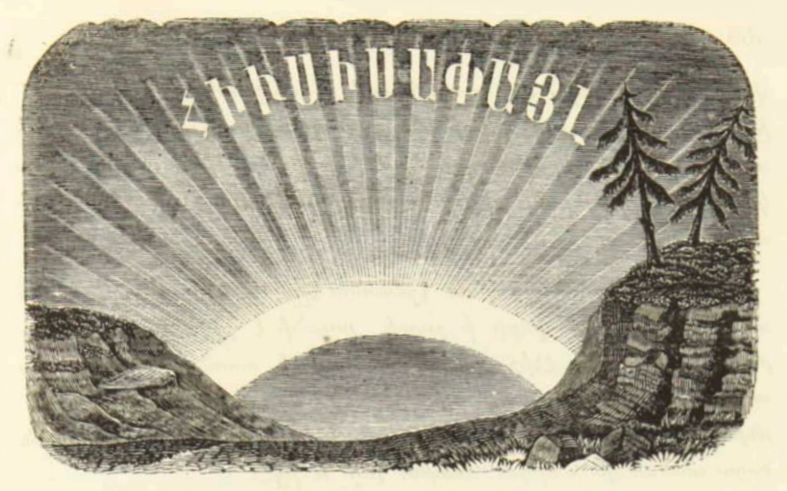
The header of Hyusisapayl, a self-styled journal of national enlightenment and education, which Nalbandian helped to establish and contributed to extensively

Nalbandian thereafter abandoned his plans to become a priest, and moved to Moscow in late July 1853. In October 1853 he began teaching the Armenian language at the Lazarev Institute of Oriental Languages in Moscow, after receiving a certificate from the Saint Petersburg Imperial University. There, he became acquainted with Stepanos Nazarian. At Catholicos Nerses's prompting, Nalbandian was briefly arrested in Moscow in January 1854 for alleged "illegal activities". He was fired from the Lazarev Institute in September 1854. After twice failing to enter as a regular student, Nalbandian attended the Imperial Moscow University from 1854 to 1858 as an auditing student of medicine.

In 1858 he collaborated with Stepanos Nazarian to establish the monthly journal Hyusisapayl (Հիւսիսափայլ, Northern Lights or Aurora Borealis), which was published in Moscow until 1864. It has been characterized as a radical, secular, and anti-clerical journal, which was the earliest public voice of liberalism among Armenians. The name was influenced by the journal Poliarnaia zvezda ("Northern Star"), published by Russian radicals Herzen and Ogarev in London. He left the editorial board of the monthly in the fall of 1859; however, his works continued to be published there. Until his departure, Nalbandian authored and translated most of the articles for Hyusisapayl.

From March to July 1859 he traveled throughout Europe, visiting Warsaw, Paris, London, and several German cities, where he met activists (e.g., Stepan Voskan, editor of Paris-based Arevmutk) and acquired knowledge about the socio-economic and political conditions of the time. In June 1860 he defended his dissertation at the Faculty of Oriental Studies at the Saint Petersburg Imperial University. His dissertation was titled "On the Study of the Armenian Language in Europe and Scientific Significance of Armenian Literature". To become a candidate, he had earlier passed exams in history, theology and the following languages: Russian, Armenian, Georgian, and Turkish.

=== Travels ===
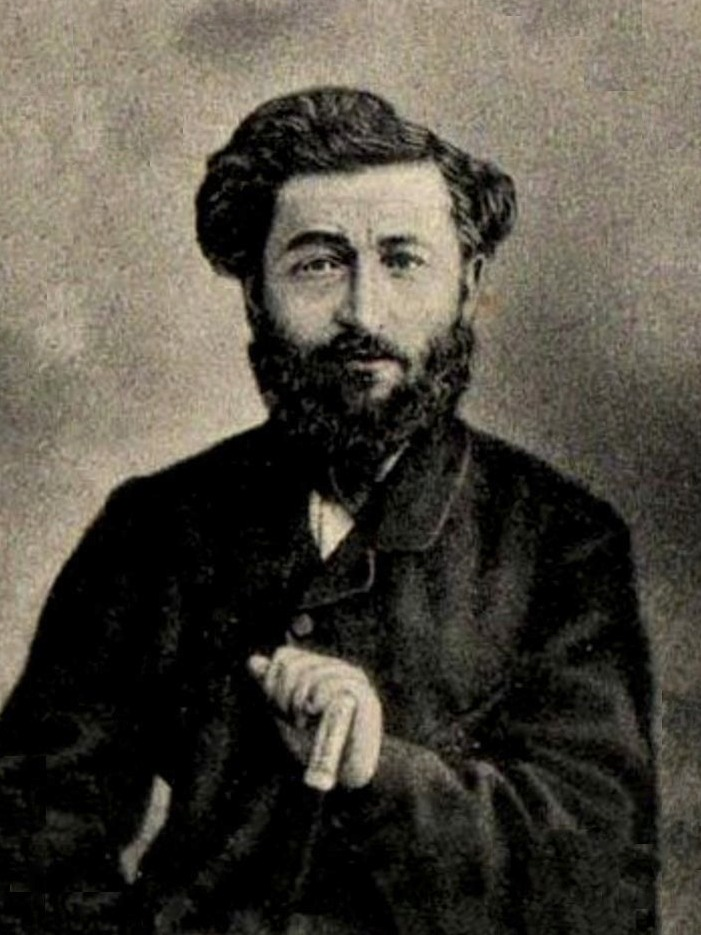
An undated photo of Nalbandian

He subsequently left for Calcutta, India to arrange the transfer of a large amount willed by an Armenian merchant to the Armenian community of New Nakhichevan. In a July 1860 meeting of some 300 community members of New Nakhichevan, he was elected as the representative to travel to India. His travels lasted from August 1860 to May 1862. They had a significant impact on Nalbandian's views. He visited Tiflis—where he met Ghazaros Aghayan and other Armenian intellectuals—Russian (Eastern) Armenia and Constantinople. In his only visit to Russian Armenia, he traveled to Yerevan, Etchmiadzin (the center of the Armenian Church), and the grave of Mesrop Mashtots, the 5th-century inventor of the Armenian alphabet, in Oshakan. In Constantinople he met with Harutiun Svadjian, the editor of Meghu, and other members of the local Armenian intelligentsia.

On his way to London to obtain official permission for his journey, he visited Italy (Messina, Sicily, Naples, Rome, and Genoa), and contacted with independence activists—supporters of Giuseppe Garibaldi, the leader of the Italian unification movement. In London, he was confirmed by the Russian embassy and the British Foreign Office as New Nakhichevan's representative to arrange the transfer of the will from India. He thereafter traveled to Calcutta via Marseille, Alexandria, Suez, Aden, Ceylon, and Madras. After successfully arranging the transfer of the money of Maseh Babajan, Nalbandian left India in September 1861.

=== Arrest and death ===
While in London, he created tight connections with the "London propagandists": Alexander Herzen and Nikolay Ogarev, participated in framing the program of the reformist organization Land and Liberty (Zemlya i volya). With Mikhail Bakunin he searched for means to disseminate Kolokol in southern Russia, the Caucasus, and the Ottoman Empire. In Paris he met with Ivan Turgenev, and published two political works: "Two lines" (Erku togh, 1861) and "Agriculture as the True Way" (Երկրագործութիւնը որպէս ուղիղ ճանապարհ, 1862).

In May 1862 he returned to Petersburg, where he participated in the activities of Land and Liberty along with Nikolay Chernyshevsky and Nikolai Serno-Solovyevich. His contacts with Russian radicals led to his arrest on 14 June 1862 in New Nakhichevan. He was initially taken to Ekaterinoslav, subsequently to Moscow, and eventually to the Peter and Paul Fortress in Petersburg on 27 July 1862. He was held at the Alekseyevskiy ravelin of the fortress with Nikolay Chernyshevsky, Nikolai Serno-Solovyevich, and others. In prison he acquired rheumatism.

He was allowed to read books by the prison administrations. He read encyclopedias, Khachatur Abovian's Wounds of Armenia and made extensive annotations, Henry Thomas Buckle's History of Civilisation in England, Georg Kolb's Handbuch der vergleichenden Statistik, Dmitri Mendeleev's textbook Organic Chemistry, and Alexis de Tocqueville's Democracy in America.

On 10 December 1865 Nalbandian was found guilty by the Governing Senate in the following crimes: being aware of the criminal intentions of the "London propagandists", supporting them in disseminating banned literature in southern Russia among Armenians, and an aspiration to start an anti-government movement.

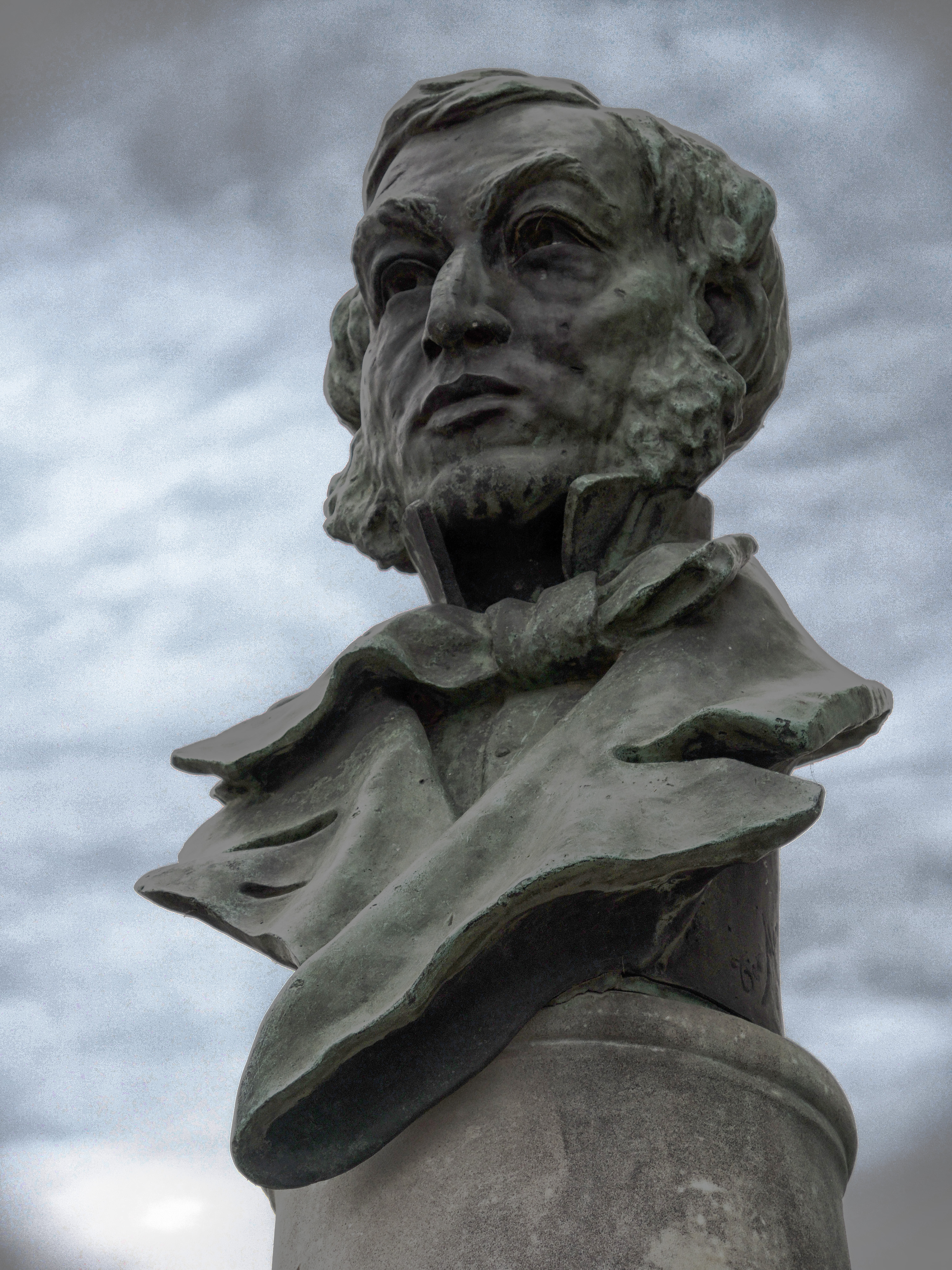
The bust of Nalbandian at his grave at the courtyard of Holy Cross Armenian Church, Rostov-on-Don

From May to late November 1865 Nalbandian was put into virtual house arrest in St. Petersburg. He was then exiled to the city of Kamyshin in the Saratov Governorate. He reached Kamyshin "more dead than alive," in his own words. Having already contracted tuberculosis, he also frequently had a high fever. Nalbandian died on 31 March (12 April in the New Style) in Kamyshin.

In accordance with his wishes, his two brothers took his body to New Nakhichevan. On 13 April they reached New Nakhichevan and took his body to the Armenian Cathedral of St. Gregory the Illuminator. His funeral took place on 14 April; thousands of people attended it. He was buried at the courtyard of the Holy Cross Armenian Church in Rostov-on-Don, located some 5 kilometres (3.1 mi) to the north of New Nakhichevan. His funeral turned into an anti-government demonstration, which led to a year-long investigation by the Russian police. In 1902 the Armenian community of New Nakhichevan erected Nalbandian's bust on his grave.

== Views and philosophy ==
A radical, Nalbandian was an advocate of reform, renewal, and progress. He championed secularism and anti-clericalism. In Soviet historiography, Nalbandian was characterized as a materialist, revolutionary democrat, and a utopian socialist. Bardakjian summarizes his views as follows:

In both his literary and journalistic pieces, Nalbandian emerges as an unrelenting champion of freedom and equality; a fearless opponent of despotism, imperialism, and serfdom; an interpreter of human life from materialistic positions; a tireless propagandist of enlightenment, science, and scientific approach; a believer in agriculture as the key to prosperity and independence; uncompromisingly anti-clerical; and a zealous supporter of Modern Armenian. A large body of literature and evidence, amassed by Soviet Armenian critics, establishes him as a revolutionary democrat.

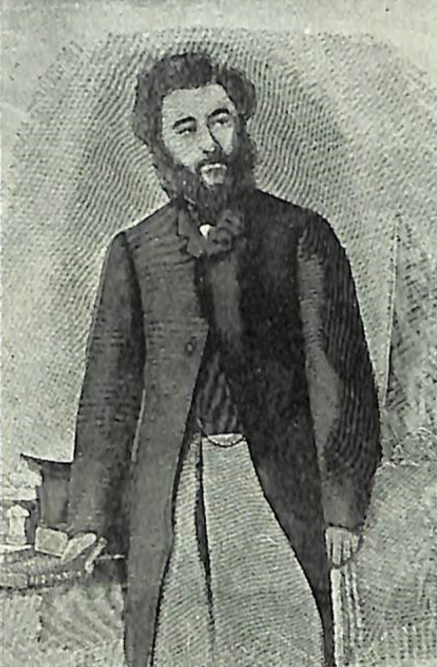
Nalbandian's picture in a 1904 book by the historian Leo

Ronald Grigor Suny notes that Nalbandian was "used and misused by Soviet historians as the Armenian equivalent to the Russian 'enlighteners' of the late 1850s and early 1860s—Herzen, Ogarev, Chernyshevskii, and Dobroliubov." According to Louise Nalbandian, he "became a link between the revolutionary movement in Russia and that of Armenia." According to Suny, although Nalbandian was "influenced by many of the same intellectual currents as the Russian radicals, Nalbandian's interests were almost exclusively contained within the world of the Armenians." He has been described as ideologically a narodnik. Soviet historiography portrayed him as an internationalist, who fought for the liberty of all peoples, especially those of Russia. In 1862 Nalbandian spoke out in support of the North during the American Civil War, which aimed to end slavery.

He believed in the importance of both individual and national freedom. Nalbandian also advocated female education. Nalbandian's outlook was humanistic. In 1859 essay on Alexander von Humboldt, he argued that science should serve humanity. He had an intense interest in how science-based policies could improve human conditions. Soviet historians considered Nalbandian to be a follower of the "anthropological materialism" of Ludwig Feuerbach.

Nalbandian admired many Western European authors, including utopian socialists Robert Owen and Charles Fourier, the anarchist Pierre-Joseph Proudhon, authors Goethe, Friedrich Schiller, Lord Byron, French Lumières Montesquieu, Rousseau, and Voltaire. He especially admired Rousseau for his promotion of democracy, republicanism, anti-clericalism, and defense of civil liberties. In 1865, while in prison, Nalbandian wrote a poem to Rousseau's memory. Nalbandian also praised Shakespeare's plays for their realism and often quoted or referred to Shakespeare in his writings. He greatly appreciated Giuseppe Verdi's works and was particularly amazed by Il trovatore. In his literary and aesthetic views, Nalbandian was also influenced by Aristotle, Nicolas Boileau-Despréaux, Gotthold Ephraim Lessing, Hegel. In August 1863 he authored a critique on Hegel, in which he extensively quoted Chernyshevsky.

=== Religion ===
"We Armenians have lacked secular learning up to the present time; for better or worse, we have had and continue to have only religious learning.... The times have passed when the priests could reinforce whatever direction they chose by apportioning and weighing and measuring out the light of wisdom to the nation."

— from Nalbandian's foreword to his translation (1859) of Eugène Sue's The Wandering Jew.

Although Nalbandian initially planned to become a priest of the Armenian Apostolic Church, he abandoned those plans after learning about the corruption within the church. He became highly critical of the conservative clergy of the Armenian Apostolic Church. He often verbally attacked and criticized high-level clergy, such as Catholicos Nerses Ashtaraketsi and Archbishop Gabriel Aivazovsky. He attacked conservative clerics (and other perceived obscurantist community leaders) for their efforts to stifle secular and Western-style learning in Armenian schools.

In his historical essays he often made positive references to the Reformation. It led to him being called a Protestant and unbeliever by Hovhannes Chamurian (Teroyents), a contemporary conservative cleric. A Constantinople-based conservative journal declared him a heretic. Nalbandian's religious views have been described by Vardan Jaloyan as being essentially deistic and liberal Christian. Although he never self-identified as such, Soviet historians widely called him an atheist.

Nalbandian, along with other secular and, usually, anti-clerical writers such as Raffi, contributed to the secularization of the Armenian public life. Hacikyan et al. note that his anti-clericalism did not mean that he was anti-Christian. In fact, he considered Christianity a means of abolishing despotism and a source of love and freedom. However, he argued that religion is distinct from national identity and cannot be pivotal to human existence. Nalbandian viewed religion as primarily a tool to formulate moral values. He criticized the Armenian Church's claim that it had preserved Armenian identity through centuries of foreign rule. Instead, he argued, that Armenians have assimilated in Christian countries, and the primary cause of perseverance of Armenian identity has been Muslim rule.

==== Anti-Catholicism ====
Nalbandian was highly critical of Catholicism, its anti-Enlightenment and conservative attitudes, and its influence among Armenians. He translated an anti-Catholic novel by Clémence Robert and Eugène Sue's The Wandering Jew (1859). The latter is reformist novel highly critical of the Jesuits. He saw the Armenian Catholic order of the Mekhitarists (based in Venice and Vienna) as followers of "papal morality." He believed that the Pope used the Mekhitarists against Armenians because their translations into Armenian spread Catholicism. He considered them scholastic monks who do not contribute to advancement of Armenians. His attacks on Catholicism "should be understood as part of his struggle to liberate Armenian literature from its medieval, religious roots, which he felt had been revived and nourished by the Mekhitarist fathers. The lack of life and vitality in Armenian writing and its failure to command a wide audience among Armenians were the result of the monopoly of writing in the hands of clerics." He advocated a direct move towards the West—towards the French Enlightenment and the European Revolutions of 1848.

=== Nationalism ===
Nalbandian was a key figure in the formation of secular Armenian nationalism by the mid-19th century. He was Khachatur Abovian's successor as a key figure in the Armenian Enlightenment. His vision of Armenian nationality was distinct from the Armenian religious community. The national identity he advocated was based on the concepts of the sense of belonging to the common people. It would be only possible in case of raising the national consciousness among the ordinary people. He emphasized the widespread use, both in written and oral forms, of the Armenian language. "The heart and soul of the nation can keep their quality and distinctiveness pure only by being fashioned under the influence of the national language," he argued. He reserved an important role to women in instilling national consciousness into their children.

His nationalism has been described as "non-territorial" and cultural, which focused on the people rather than territory. However, he also made references to the Armenian homeland. In a 1861 letter addressed to Harutiun Svadjian, his major Western Armenian ally, he wrote: "Etna and Vesuvius are still smoking"—in reference to the Italian unification—"is there no fire left in the old volcano of Ararat?"

=== Language ===
Nalbandian's native language was the New Nakhichevan dialect, a Western Armenian dialect. He wrote his letters to his brothers in the dialect. In his literary career, however, he mostly used standard vernacular Eastern Armenian. In his early years, he had used classical Armenian (grabar). In his mature years Nalbandian became a staunch advocate of literary Modern Armenian (ashkharhabar), only through which, he believed, could the Armenian people be enlightened. Nalbandian's and other modernizers' (e.g., Raphael Patkanian, Abovian) promotion of Modern Armenian became a primary cause of cultural innovation and educational reform. He defended his insistence of the use of Modern Armenian by citing Dante Alighieri's successful use of Italian, as opposed to Latin.

In 1865, while in prison, he formulated the notion of a "national literature." He aligned with realism ("art as a mirror of reality") and valued such pieces as Abovian's Wounds of Armenia, Sos and Vartiter by Perch Proshian, and Vartan Pasha's Akabi, written in Turkish using the Armenian script. He also authored a modern Armenian rendering of Ghazar Parpetsi's A Letter to Vahan Mamikonian (Թուղթ առ Վահան Մամիկոնեան).

=== Economics ===
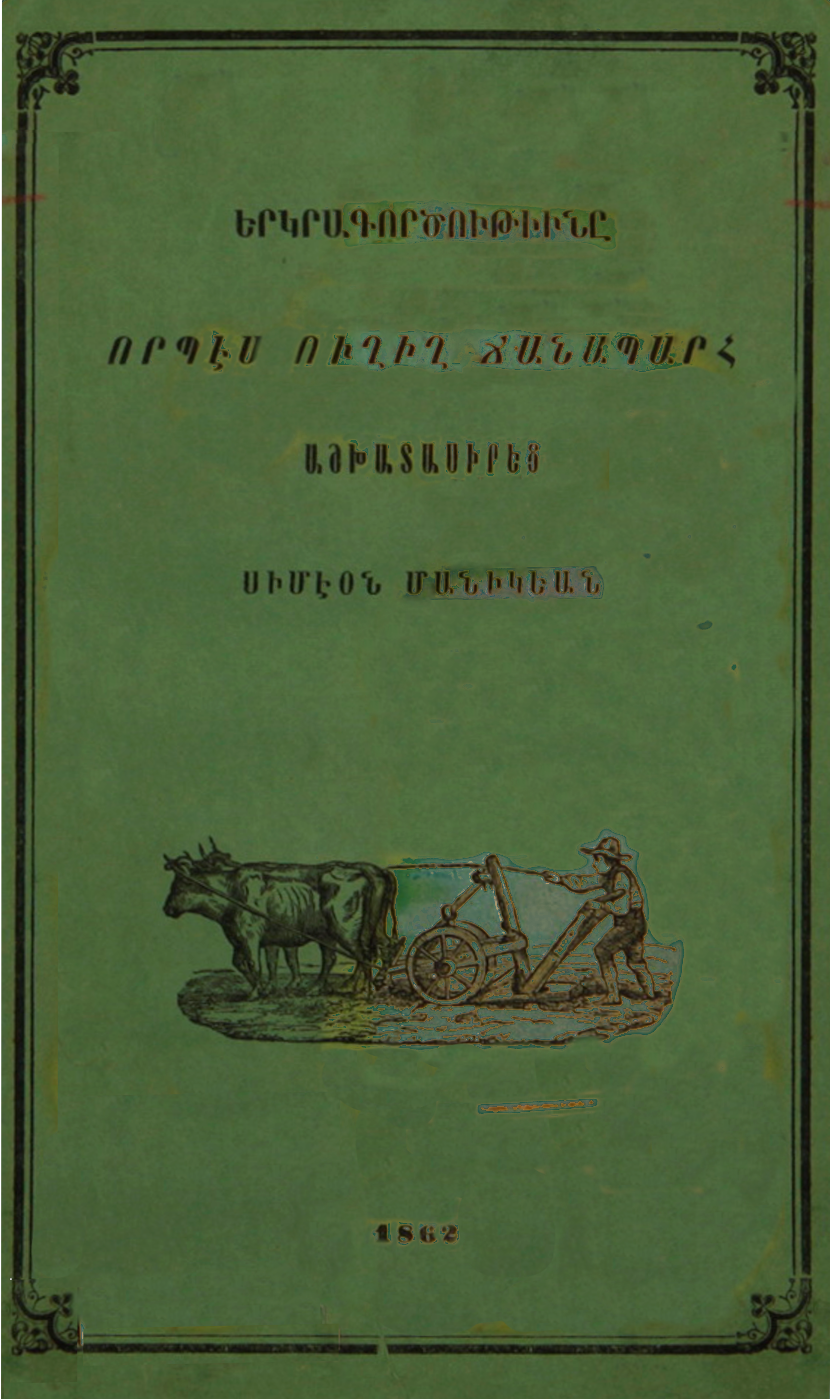
The cover of "Agriculture as the True Way"

Nalbandian stressed that economic freedom is the basis of national freedom. Agriculture was, in his view, the key towards economic freedom and considered the trade capital of Armenian merchants as not contributing to the formation of a national economy among Armenians. Nalbandian's chief work on economics is "Agriculture as the True Way," published in Paris in 1862 under the pseudonym Simeon Manikian. It is considered the first modern Armenian-language political tract or pamphlet. It advocated land reform, namely equal redistribution of land following the Emancipation reform of 1861, which emancipated serfs throughout the Russian Empire. Louise Nalbandian considered it a display of Nalbandian's "socialist viewpoint" and his "conviction that only the equal distribution of land could bring prosperity and happiness to the people." The pamphlet influenced the economic views of both Russian (Eastern) Armenian, and, to a lesser degree, Ottoman (Western) Armenian intellectuals.

His views may have been influenced by the French Physiocrats, who believed that the wealth of nations was derived solely from agriculture. In the Soviet period, his economic views were discussed from a Marxist perspective, especially class struggle, and he was characterized as an anti-capitalist.

== Works ==
Nalbandian's oeuvre consists of poems on patriotism and freedom, novels that expose social ills, essays and articles on national and political issues, economics, philosophy, education, and a series of pieces of literary criticism. He often used pseudonyms, the best known of which is "Koms Emmanuel" (Count Emmanuel). Under that pseudonym, Nalbandian composed short stories, published in Hyusisapayl, that portrayed the Armenian clergy's mysticism, deceitfulness, and ignorance. He often wrote exposés on the clergy, such as Merelahartsuk ("The Necromancer"). His irreverent style was displayed in his satires, memories, literary reviews, historical essays, and poetry. In 1857 he wrote what Vahé Oshagan described as the first ethnographic novel in Armenian literature Minin Khoske, Miusin Harsn ("A Promise to One, A Bride to the Other"). According to Leo, it was the first printed Russian Armenian novel, being printed in Moscow in 1857, a year before Abovian's Wounds of Armenia, printed a year later in Tiflis. Leo considered it a weak work literarily, but gave some credit to its ethnographic scenes.

=== Poetry ===
Nalbandian's first poem, in classical Armenian, was published in January 1851 in the Tiflis-based weekly Ararat, edited by Raphael Patkanian. He is today best remembered popularly for two of his poems: "Freedom/Liberty" (Ազատութիւն, Azatutyun, 1859) and "The Song of an Italian Girl" (Իտալացի աղջկա երգը, 1861). Leo noted in his 1904 book that thanks to these two poems Nalbandian has a glorious reputation. According to Adalian, Nalbandian introduced the concept of political liberty into Armenian letters with these poems.

"Freedom" has become an anthem of liberty and freedom since the 19th century and one of the most popular pieces of poetry in Armenian literature. It may have been influenced by Nikolay Ogarev's poem of the same name. The poem was first published in 1859 in Hyusisapayl as part of Nalbandian's series titled "Memoirs" (Hishatakaran). Harutiun Svadjian, a friend of Nalbandian, first published the poem separately, in his Constantinople-based newspaper Meghu in 1860. Perhaps as early as late 1860s, it was set to music and sung by Armenian youth. Often, it was written on the back of his photograph. The poem has been included in Armenian literature textbooks since the Soviet period. It has been translated into English at least twice, including by Alice Stone Blackwell, and three times into Russian.

"The Song of an Italian Girl", although dated by Nalbandian himself to 1859, was more likely written in 1860–61. It is inspired by the Italian unification movement and the 5th-century Armenian historian Yeghishe's description of Armenian women. The lyrics of the poem were adopted by the government of the First Republic of Armenia (1918–20) for the country's national anthem, "Mer Hayrenik" ("Our Fatherland"), the poem's incipit. The anthem was reinstated by the government of Armenia on 1 July 1991 with some changes.

His other noted poems include "Days of Childhood" (Մանկության օրեր, 1860), "To Apollo" (Ապոլլոնին, 1861), and "Message" (Ուղերձ, 1864). He also translated poems by Alexander Pushkin, Mikhail Lermontov, Heinrich Heine, and Pierre-Jean de Béranger.

== Recognition and influence ==
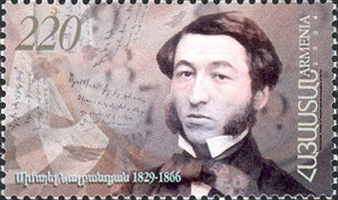
Nalbandian on a 2005 stamp of Armenia

Vahakn Dadrian characterized Nalbandian as the 19th-century apostle of Armenian revolutionism. Ronald Grigor Suny described him as "perhaps the most radical, certainly the most contentious and openly anticlerical of the mid-century Armenian patriots." He was part of Russian Armenian intellectuals of the mid-to-late 19th century that were experiencing their own "amalgamated version of the Reformation and the Enlightenment simultaneously." Hacikyan et al. described him as a revolutionary intellectual and pioneer of the Armenian Renaissance. Christopher J. Walker noted that despite his short life, "his example and his writings remained a vivid inspiration to his people."

In the last years of his life Nalbandian had become a contentious figure, hated by the leadership of the Armenian Church. The "bold, somewhat reckless, and ultimately victimized" Nalbandian was the most outspoken representative of the secular Armenian intelligentsia. Archbishop Matteos Vehapetian, under whom he worked for five years, and Stepanos Nazarian, with whom he founded Hyusisapayl, both had ambivalent views on Nalbandian. Although personally sympathetic to him, they disagreed with his views, considering them extreme. Vehapetian often defended him, despite disagreeing with his views and called him an excellent, moral person.

Nalbandian has been well-regarded by fellow writers. Perch Proshian and Harutiun Svadjian praised his freethought. Ghazaros Aghayan noted that students of the Nersisian School of Tiflis widely read Nalbandian and were influenced by his radicalism. In his 1904, Leo ranked Nalbandian lower than Raphael Patkanian in terms of literary talent, but noted that he had a high reputation among the youth. He attributed Nalbandian's reputation to his poems that were set to music and the fact that Nalbandian wrote about the societal ideals of self-recognition, revival, freedom, and fatherland.

Raffi was heavily influenced by Nalbandian, calling himself "sympathetic to Nalbandian's direction, which is the only true path." He dedicated his first major novel, Salbi (1867), to the memory of Nalbandian. The influence of Nalbandian's views on agriculture (namely, equal distribution of land) are evident in Salbi. Hovhannes Tumanyan and Yeghishe Charents wrote an essay and a poem dedicated to Nalbandian's memory in 1916 and 1929, respectively. Nalbandian's influence was also felt in the Western Armenian world. On the occasion of the first anniversary of Nalbandian's death, the young Constantinopolitan poet and playwright Bedros Tourian wrote the play Darakir i Siberia (Exiled in Siberia), dedicated to Nalbandian's memory.

=== Political influence ===
==== Zeytun uprising of 1862 ====
Nalbandian indirectly influenced the Armenian rebels of Zeitun, a mountainous region in Cilicia, Ottoman Empire that enjoyed some autonomy up to the 19th century. The uprising there took place in 1862. The rebel leaders were in contact with some of the Armenian intellectuals based in Constantinople who had met Nalbandian in 1860–61 and were influenced by Nalbandian's ideas. The intellectuals' organization, named the Benevolent Union, included Tserents, Harutiun Svadjian, Mgrdich Beshiktashlian, Serovbe Takvorian, and Dr. Kaitibian. Nalbandian regularly corresponded with Tagvorian, Kaitibian, and Svadjian. Besides the aim to improve the conditions of the Armenians, they promoted economic development of the Armenians through better agricultural methods. According to Louise Nalbandian, the pronounced "interest in agriculture was no doubt due to the influence of Nalbandian" and that Nalbandian's "political influence was felt in Constantinople by a group of revolutionaries who had direct relations with the Zeitun insurgents."

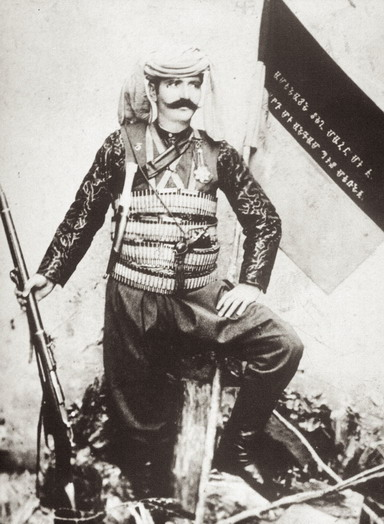
An undated photo of Andranik, a prominent Armenian fedayi. The text on the flag seen in the background is from Nalbandian's poem "The Song of an Italian Girl".

==== Posthumous ====
Nalbandian's political influence has been ubiquitous. He was quickly lionized by liberals, nationalists, and leftists.

In 1879 philologist Tigran Navasardiants was notably arrested for distributing portraits of Nalbandian with the poem "Freedom" in Alexandropol. In mid-1880s an Armenian organization in Tiflis led by Christapor Mikayelian, a member of the populist revolutionary Narodnaya Volya, disseminated Nalbandian's pamphlet on agriculture among the urban poor. Mikayelian went on to become on the co-founders of the Armenian Revolutionary Federation (Dashnaks), a major left-wing nationalist party that led the Armenian national liberation movement in both Russian and Ottoman empires. According to Louise Nalbandian, the founders of the Armenian Revolutionary Federation were the "spiritual descendants" of Nalbandian and other secular nationalist intellectuals such as Khachatur Abovian, Raphael Patkanian, and Raffi. Armenian revolutionaries' use of violence (armed struggle) since the late 1880s against their oppressors, especially Ottomans and Kurds, was also influenced by the writings of Nalbandian, Patkanian and Raffi.

Nalbandian also influenced the Social Democrat Hunchakian Party (Hunchak) and early Armenian Marxists, such as Stepan Shahumian, Alexander Miasnikian, and Bogdan Knuniants. Shahumian attacked Armenian liberals for claiming Nalbandian as their ideological forefather. Miasnikian, who was a distant relative of Nalbandian, offered a Marxist interpretation of Nalbandian as early as in 1910. It was later published as a booklet in Moscow in 1919. According to Miasnikian, Nalbandian was an agrarian and utopian socialist, who "came close to modern materialism," which Miasinikian considered a great achievement. He also called Nalbandian a friend of the Armenian proletariat and peasantry.

=== Soviet period ===
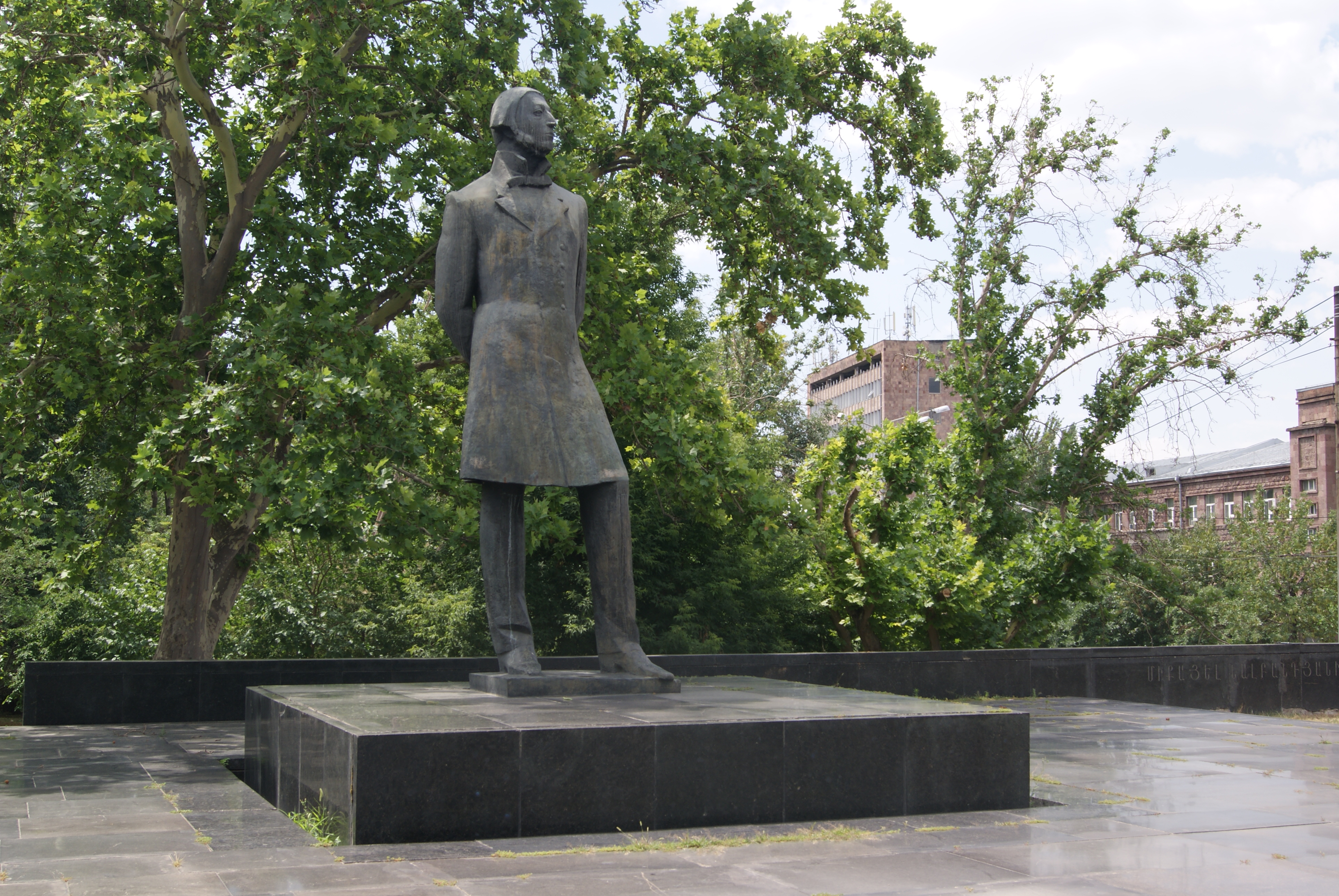
Nalbandian's 1965 statue in Yerevan

Soviet Armenian critics elevated Nalbandian to the status of a visionary for his left-wing and anti-clerical views. Daronian called him the founder of Armenian realism and criticism. Soviet Armenian philologist Aram Inchikian called him "the greatest figure of Armenian social thought of the pre-Marxist period and the precursor of social democracy in our reality." Historian H. Aslanian described him as a "militant materialist, the greatest figure in pre-Marxist materialist thought in Armenian reality, and irreconcilable enemy of all idealistic, reactionary views." Nalbandian was also among the revolutionary writers praised by Anastas Mikoyan in his speech in Yerevan of March 1954, beginning the Khrushchev Thaw in Soviet Armenia. Ashot Hovhannisian, an early Armenian Marxist and the first Education Minister of Soviet Armenia (1920–21), wrote a two volume book entitled Nalbandian and his time (Նալբանդյանը և նրա ժամանակը, 1955–56). In 1979, a scientific conference on Nalbandian's 150th anniversary was held at the Armenian Academy of Sciences.

In 1921, in the first year of Soviet rule, one of the central streets of Yerevan was renamed after Nalbandian. The Soviet Armenian government decreed in 1922 to erect a statue of Nalbandian, along with Abovian, Vahan Terian, Gabriel Sundukian and Bolshevik and Communist figures in Yerevan. A 4.5-metre (15 ft) bronze statue of Nalbandian was eventually unveiled in 1965. A public school in Yerevan was renamed in his honor in 1941. In 1949 the Pedagogical Institute of Leninakan (current Gyumri) was renamed after Nalbandian. In 1950 a village known as Shahriar was renamed Nalbandian in his honor. In Rostov-on-Don, a street has been named for Nalbandian.

== Bibliography ==
Books

- Bardakjian, Kevork B., ed. (2000). A Reference Guide to Modern Armenian Literature, 1500–1920: With an Introductory History. Wayne State University Press. ISBN 9780814327470.
- Panossian, Razmik (2006). The Armenians: From Kings and Priests to Merchants and Commissars. New York: Columbia University Press. ISBN 9780231139267.
- Suny, Ronald Grigor (1993). Looking Toward Ararat: Armenia in Modern History. Indiana University Press. ISBN 9780253207739.
- Khachaturian, Lisa (2011). Cultivating Nationhood in Imperial Russia: The Periodical Press and the Formation of a Modern Armenian Identity. Transaction Publishers. ISBN 9781412813723.
- Nalbandian, Louise (1963). The Armenian Revolutionary Movement. Berkeley, CA: University of California Press.
- Walker, Christopher J. (1990) [1980]. Armenia: The Survival of a Nation (2nd ed.). New York: St. Martin's Press. ISBN 978-0-312-04230-1.
- Inchikian, Aram [in Armenian] (1954). Միքայել Նալբանդյանի կյանքի և գործունեության տարեգրությունը [Chronology of the life and activities of Mikayel Nalbandian] (in Armenian). Yerevan: Armenian SSR Academy of Sciences. Archived from the original on 21 May 2026.
- Sarkisyanz, Manuel [in German] (1975). A Modern History of Transcaucasian Armenia: Social, Cultural, and Political. Udyama Commercial Press.
- Leo (Arakel Babakhanian) (1904). Ռուսահայոց գրականութիւնը [Russian Armenian Literature] (PDF). Venice: S. Lazarus.
- Khachaturian, Ashot B. [in Russian] (1983). М. Л. Налбандян [M. L. Nalbandian] (in Russian). Moscow: Mysl. Archived from the original on 24 February 2022.
- Matossian, Mary Kilbourne (1962). The Impact of Soviet Policies in Armenia. Leiden: E.J. Brill.
- Jrbashian, Edward (1994). Թումանյանը եւ հայ գրականության ավանդույթները [Tumanyan and the traditions of Armenian literature] (in Armenian). Yerevan: Armenian National Academy of Sciences. ISBN 5-8080-0310-5.
- Gabrielyan, Vazgen (2018). Դիտարկումներ գրականության ճանապարհին [Observations on the road to literature] (PDF) (in Armenian). Yerevan: Yerevan State University Publishing House. ISBN 978-5-8084-2265-0.
- Muradyan, Samvel (2021). Հայ նոր գրականության պատմություն․ Ուսումնական ձեռնարկ [History of modern Armenian literature: Educational guide] (PDF) (in Armenian). Vol. 1. Yerevan State University Publishing House. ISBN 978-5-8084-2500-2.

Book chapters

- Adalian, Rouben Paul (2010). Historical Dictionary of Armenia. Lanham, Maryland: Scarecrow Press. ISBN 978-0-8108-7450-3.
- Daronian, Sergei [in Armenian] (1974). "Налбандян Микаэл [Nalbandian Mikael]". Great Soviet Encyclopedia Volume 17. p. 225. online
- Daronian, Sergei [in Armenian] (1982). "Նալբանդյան Միքայել [Nalbandian Mikayel]". Soviet Armenian Encyclopedia Volume 8 (in Armenian). pp. 150–152.
- Oshagan, Vahé (2004). "Modem Armenian Literature and Intellectual History". In Hovannisian, Richard G. (ed.). Armenian People from Ancient to Modern Times, vol. 2. New York: St. Martin’s Press.
- Suny, Ronald Grigor (2004). "Eastern Armenians under Tsarist Rule". In Hovannisian, Richard G. (ed.). Armenian People from Ancient to Modern Times, vol. 2. New York: St. Martin’s Press.
- Hacikyan, Agop Jack; Basmajian, Gabriel; Franchuk, Edward S.; Ouzounian, Nourhan (2005). The Heritage of Armenian Literature: From the eighteenth century to modern times. Detroit: Wayne State University Press. ISBN 9780814332214.
- Movsisyan, Nane A. (2017). "Կրոնական ինքնության փոխակերպման լուսավորական հարացույցը [The Enlightenment Paradigm of Religious Identify Transformation]" (PDF). Հայ փիլիսոփայությունը ազգային ինքնության հարացույցների կառուցարկման ու արդիականացման համատեքստում [Armenian Philosophy in the Context of the Paradigms of National Identity Construction and Modernization] (in Armenian). Yerevan State University Press. pp. 159–190. ISBN 978-5-8084-2240-7.

Scholarly articles

- Gharibjanian, Gevorg [in Armenian] (1979). "Միքայել Նալբանդյանը հայ մարքսիստական մտքի գնահատմամբ (նախահոկտեմբերյան շրջան) [Mikayel Nalbandian through the eyes of Armenian Marxist thought (pre-October Revolution period)]". Patma-Banasirakan Handes (in Armenian). 11 (11): 3–17.
- Petrosian, E. (1954). "Րաֆֆու 60-ական թվականների ստեղծագործությունները [Raffi's works of the 1860s]". Bulletin of the Academy of Sciences of the Armenian SSR: Social Sciences (in Armenian). 8 (8): 64. Archived from the original on 30 May 2016.
- Jrbashian, Edvard [in Armenian] (1983). ""Ուղիղ ճանապարհի" մեծ որոնողը (Մտորումներ Միքայել Նալբանդյանի անհատականության մասին)" (PDF). Banber Erevani Hamalsarani (in Armenian). 2 (50). Yerevan State University: 48–74. Archived from the original (PDF) on 7 January 2019.
- Suvaryan, Yu.; Suvaryan, A. (2012). "Միքայել Նալբանդյանը հանրային կառավարման հիմնախնդիրների մասին [Michael Nalbandyan on Public Administration]". Lraber Hasarakakan Gitutyunneri (in Armenian). 4 (4): 110–119.
- Sargsian, M. G. (1954). "Միքայել Նալբանդյան (Կենսագրություն) [Mikayel Nalbandian (Biography)]". Etchmiadzin (in Armenian). 11 (12). Mother See of Holy Etchmiadzin: 6–17.
- Jrbashian, Edvard [in Armenian] (1958). "Միքայել Նալբանդյանը և արևմտաեվրոպական գրականությունը [Mikael Nalbandian and West-European Literature]". Patma-Banasirakan Handes. 2 (2): 67–96.
- Shmavonian, Sarkis (1983). "Mikayel Nalbandian and Non-Territorial Armenian Nationalism". Armenian Review. 36 (3): 35–56.
