= Anthem of the Armenian Soviet Socialist Republic =

Haykakan Sovetakan Sotsialistakan Hanrapetuthyun orhnerg
English: State Anthem of the Armenian Soviet Socialist Republic
- Հայկական Սովետական Սոցիալիստական Հանրապետություն օրհներգ
- Former regional anthem of the Armenian Soviet Socialist Republic
- Lyrics: Sarmen
- Music: Aram Khachaturian, 1944
- Adopted: 1944; 82 years ago
- Relinquished: 1991; 35 years ago
- Succeeded by: "Mer Hayrenik"

Audio sample
- Official orchestral and choral vocal recording (post-Stalinist lyrics): file; help

1968 official band instrumental recording
Performed by the Brass Band of the Ministry of Defence of the USSR

The State Anthem of the Armenian Soviet Socialist Republic was the national anthem of Armenia when it was a republic of the Soviet Union and known as the Armenian Soviet Socialist Republic. It was used between 1944 and 1991. Its music was composed by Armenian composer Aram Khachaturian, and the lyrics were written by Sarmen. Along with the Anthem of the Estonian SSR, it is one of the only two SSR anthems without an intro.

Upon independence from the Soviet Union in 1991, the newly independent Armenia adopted its previous anthem "Mer Hayrenik" in its place, though there has been occasional debate about restoring the music of the anthem of the Armenian SSR with different lyrics as the national anthem.

== Lyrics ==
=== Post-Stalinist version ===
Armenian original

I
Սովետական ազատ աշխարհ Հայաստան՝
Բազում դարեր դաժան ճամփա դու անցար՝
Քաջ որդիք քո մաքառեցին քեզ համար՝
Որ դառնաս դու մայր հայրենիք հայության։

Կրկներգ․
Փառք քեզ՝ միշտ փառք՝ Սովետական Հայաստան՝
Աշխատասեր՝ ճարտարագործ-շինարար՝
Ժողովրդոց սուրբ դաշինքով անսասան՝
Դու ծաղկում ես և կերտում լույս ապագադ։

II
Լենինն անմահ մեզ հուրն անշեջ պարգեվեց՝
Մեր դեմ շողաց երջանկաբեր այգաբաց՝
Հոկտեմբերը կործանումից մեզ փրկեց
Եվ տվեց մեզ նոր՝ պայծառ կյանք փառապանծ։

Կրկներգ

III
Մեծ Ռուսիան մեզ եղբայրության ձեռք մեկնեց՝
Մենք կերտեցինք ամրակուռ նոր պետություն՝
Լենինյան մեր կուսակցությունն իմաստուն
Հաղթորեն մեզ դեպ կոմունիզմ է տանում։

Կրկներգ

Transliteration

I
Sovetakan azat ashkharh Hayastan,
Bazum darer dazhan champha du antsar,
Qaj vordiq qo maqarretsin qez hamar,
Vor darrnas du mayr Hayreniq hayuthyan.

Krknerg:
Pharrq qez, misht pharrq Sovetakan Hayastan,
Ashkhataser, cartaragortz-shinarar,
Zhoghovrdots surb dashinqov ansasan,
Du tzaghkum yes yev kertum luys apagad.

II
Leninn anmah mez hurn anshej pargevets,
Mer dem shoghats yerjankaber aygabats,
Hoktemberė kortzanumits mez phrkets
Yev tvets mez nor, paytzarr kyanq pharrapantz.

Krknerg

III
Metz Rrusian mez yeghbayruthyan dzerrq meknets,
Menq kertetsinq amrakurr nor petuthyun,
Leninyan mer kusaktsuthyunn imastun,
Haghthoren mez dep komunizm e tanum.

Krknerg

IPA transcription (Note: See Help:IPA/Armenian and Armenian phonology.)

1
[so.ve.t̪a.ˈkan a.ˈzat̪ aʃ.ˈxaɾʰ ha.jas.ˈt̪an |]
[ba.ˈzum d̪a.ˈɾeɾ d̪a.ˈʒan t͡ʃam.ˈpʰa d̪u an.ˈt͡sʰaɾ |]
[kʰad͡ʒ voɾ.ˈd̪ikʰ kʰo ma.kʰa.re.ˈt͡sʰin kʰez ha.ˈmaɾ |]
[voɾ d̪ar.ˈnas d̪u majɾ haj.ɾe.ˈnikʰ ha.ju.ˈt̪ʰjan ǁ]

[kəɾk.ˈneɾɡ]
[pʰarkʰ kʰez | miʃt̪ pʰarkʰ | so.ve.t̪a.ˈkan ha.jas.ˈt̪an |]
[aʃ.xa.t̪a.ˈseɾ | t͡ʃaɾ.t̪a.ɾa.ˈgoɾt͡s ʃi.na.ˈɾaɾ |]
[ʒo.ɣo.vəɾ.ˈd̪ot͡sʰ suɾb d̪a.ʃiŋ.ˈkʰov an.sa.ˈsan |]
[d̪u t͡sʰaɣ.ˈkum jes jev keɾ.ˈt̪um lujs a.pa.ˈgad̪ ǁ]

2
[le.ˈnin.n‿an.ˈmah mez huɾn an.ˈʃed͡ʒ paɾ.ge.ˈvet͡sʰ |]
[meɾ d̪em ʃo.ˈɣat͡sʰ jeɾ.d͡ʒaŋ.ka.ˈbeɾ aj.ga.ˈbat͡sʰ |]
[hok.t̪em.ˈbe.ɾə koɾ.t͡sa.nu.ˈmit͡sʰ mez pʰəɾ.ˈket͡sʰ |]
[jev t̪ə.ˈvet͡sʰ mez noɾ ǀ paj.ˈt͡sar kjaŋkʰ pʰa.ra.ˈpant͡s ǁ]

[kəɾk.ˈneɾɡ]

3
[met͡s rus.ˈjan mez jeɣ.baj.ɾu.ˈt̪ʰjan d͡zerkʰ mek.ˈnet͡sʰ |]
[meŋkʰ keɾ.t̪e.ˈt͡sʰiŋkʰ am.ɾa.ˈkur noɾ pe.t̪u.ˈt̪ʰjun |]
[le.nin.ˈjan meɾ ku.sak.t͡sʰu.ˈt̪ʰjun.n‿i.mas.ˈt̪un |]
[haɣ.t̪ʰo.ˈɾen mez d̪ep ko.mu.ˈniz.m‿e t̪a.ˈnum ǁ]

[kəɾk.ˈneɾɡ]

English translation

I
O free land of Soviet Armenia,
You've traversed many cruel centuries,
Your brave sons have fought for you,
To become the motherland of Armenians.

Chorus:
Be forever glorious, Soviet Armenia,
You are industrious, you have forged buildings.
With the peoples' unshakeable holy alliance:
You flourish and create a bright future.

II
Immortal Lenin gave us an unrelenting fervour,
A dawn of fortune shone upon us,
The October Revolution saved us from destruction
And gave us a new, happy and glorious life.

Chorus

III
Great Russia lent us a fraternal hand,
We've built a strong, new state.
Our Leninist party victoriously
And wisely leads us to communism.

Chorus

=== Original version ===
Armenian original

I
Սովետական ազատ աշխարհ Հայաստան՝
Բազում դարեր դաժան ճամփա դու անցար՝
Քաջ նախնիք մեր մաքառեցին քեզ համար՝
Որ դառնաս դու մայր-Հայրենիք հայության։

Կրկներգ I․
Փառք քեզ՝ միշտ փառք՝ հերոսական Հայաստան՝
Հանճարեղ դու ճարտարագործ-շինարար՝
Ժողովրդոց սուրբ դաշինքով ստալինյան՝
Դու ծաղկում ես և կերտում լույս ապագադ։

II
Լենինն անմահ մեզ հուրն անշեջ պարգևեց՝
Մեր դեմ շողաց երջանկաբեր այգաբաց՝
Ստալինը մեծ՝ կործանումից մեզ փրկեց
Եվ տվեց մեզ նոր՝ ազատ կյանք փառապանծ։

Կրկներգ II․
Փառք քեզ՝ միշտ փառք՝ վերածնված Հայաստան՝
Հանճարեղ դու ճարտարագործ-շինարար՝
Ժողովրդոց սուրբ դաշինքով ստալինյան՝
Դու ծաղկում ես և կերտում լույս ապագադ։

III
Մեծ Ռուսիան մեզ եղբայրության ձեռք մեկնեց՝
Մենք կերտեցինք ամրակուռ՝ նոր պետություն՝
Ոչ մի ոսոխ չի կարող ծնկի բերել
Անսասան ժողովրդին մեր հնագույն։

Կրկներգ III․
Փառք քեզ՝ միշտ փառք՝ Սովետական Հայաստան՝
Հանճարեղ դու ճարտարագործ-շինարար՝
Ժողովրդոց սուրբ դաշինքով ստալինյան՝
Դու ծաղկում ես և կերտում լույս ապագադ։

Transliteration

I
Sovetakan azat ashkharh Hayastan,
Bazum darer dazhan campha du antsar,
Qaj nakhniq mer maqarretsin qez hamar,
Vor darrnas du mayr-Hayreniq hayuthyan.

Krknerg I:
Pharrq qez misht pharrq, herosakan Hayastan,
Hancaregh du cartaragortz-shinarar,
Zhoghovrdots surb dashinqov Stalinyan,
Du tsaghkum es yev kertum luys apagad.

II
Leninn anmah mez hurn anshej pargevets,
Mer dem shoghats yerjankaber aygabats,
Stalinė metz kortzanumits mez pherkets,
Yev tvets mez nor azat kyanq pharrapantz.

Kerknerg II:
Pharrq qez misht pharrq, veratznvatz Hayastan,
Hancaregh du cartaragortz-shinarar,
Zhoghovrdots surb dashinqov Stalinyan,
Du tsaghkum es yev kertum luys apagad.

III
Metz Rrusian mez yeghbayruthyan dzerrq meknets,
Menq kertetsinq amrakurr nor petuthyun,
Voch mi vosokh chi karogh tznki berel
Ansasan zhoghovrdin mer hnaguyn.

Krknerg III․
Pharrq qez misht pharrq, Sovetakan Hayastan,
Hancaregh du cartaragortz-shinarar,
Zhoghovrdots surb dashinqov Stalinyan,
Du tsaghkum es yev kertum luys apagad.

IPA transcription

1
[so.ve.t̪ɑ.ˈkan a.ˈzat̪ aʃ.ˈxaɾʰ ha.jas.ˈt̪an |]
[ba.ˈzum d̪a.ˈɾeɾ d̪a.ˈʒan t͡ʃam.ˈpʰa d̪u an.ˈt͡sʰaɾ |]
[kʰad͡ʒ nax.ˈnikʰ meɾ ma.kʰa.re.ˈt͡sʰin kʰez ha.ˈmaɾ |]
[voɾ d̪ar.ˈnas d̪u majɾ haj.ɾe.ˈnikʰ ha.ju.ˈt̪ʰjan ǁ]

[kəɾk.ˈneɾɡ] 1
[pʰarkʰ kʰez | miʃt̪ pʰarkʰ | he.ɾo.sa.ˈkan ha.jas.ˈt̪an |]
[han.t͡ʃa.ˈɾeɣ d̪u t͡ʃaɾ.t̪a.ɾa.ˈgoɾt͡s ʃi.na.ˈɾaɾ |]
[ʒo.ɣo.vəɾ.ˈd̪ot͡sʰ suɾb d̪a.ʃiŋ.ˈkʰov st̪a.lin.ˈjan |]
[d̪u t͡sʰaɣ.ˈkum jes jev keɾ.ˈt̪um lujs a.pa.ˈgad̪ ǁ]

2
[le.ˈnin.n‿an.ˈmah mez huɾn an.ˈʃed͡ʒ paɾ.ge.ˈvet͡sʰ |]
[meɾ d̪em ʃo.ˈɣat͡sʰ jeɾ.d͡ʒaŋ.ka.ˈbeɾ aj.ga.ˈbat͡sʰ |]
[st̪a.ˈli.nə met͡s | koɾ.t͡sa.nu.ˈmit͡sʰ mez pʰəɾ.ˈket͡sʰ |]
[jev t̪ə.ˈvet͡sʰ mez noɾ | a.ˈzat̪ kjaŋkʰ pʰa.ra.ˈpant͡s ǁ]

[kəɾk.ˈneɾɡ] 2
[pʰarkʰ kʰez | miʃt̪ pʰarkʰ | ve.ɾat͡s.ni.ˈvat͡s ha.jas.ˈt̪an |]
[han.t͡ʃa.ˈɾeɣ d̪u t͡ʃaɾ.t̪a.ɾa.ˈgoɾt͡s ʃi.na.ˈɾaɾ |]
[ʒo.ɣo.vəɾ.ˈd̪ot͡sʰ suɾb d̪a.ʃiŋ.ˈkʰov st̪a.lin.ˈjan |]
[d̪u t͡sʰaɣ.ˈkum jes jev keɾ.ˈt̪um lujs a.pa.ˈgad̪ ǁ]

3
[met͡s rus.ˈjan mez jeɣ.baj.ɾu.ˈt̪ʰjan d͡zerkʰ mek.ˈnet͡sʰ |]
[meŋkʰ keɾ.t̪e.ˈt͡sʰiŋkʰ am.ɾa.ˈkur | noɾ pe.t̪u.ˈt̪ʰjun |]
[vot͡ʃʰ mi vo.ˈsox t͡ʃʰi ka.ˈɾoɣ t͡səŋ.ˈki be.ˈɾel |]
[an.sa.ˈsan ʒo.ɣo.vəɾ.ˈd̪in meɾ hə.na.ˈɡujn ǁ]

[kəɾk.ˈneɾɡ] 3
[pʰarkʰ kʰez | miʃt̪ pʰarkʰ | so.ve.t̪a.ˈkan ha.jas.ˈt̪an |]
[han.t͡ʃa.ˈɾeɣ d̪u t͡ʃaɾ.t̪a.ɾa.ˈgoɾt͡s ʃi.na.ˈɾaɾ |]
[ʒo.ɣo.vəɾ.ˈd̪ot͡sʰ suɾb d̪a.ʃiŋ.ˈkʰov st̪a.lin.ˈjan |]
[d̪u t͡sʰaɣ.ˈkum jes jev keɾ.ˈt̪um lujs a.pa.ˈgad̪ ǁ]

English translation

I
O free land of Soviet Armenia,
You've traversed many cruel centuries,
Our brave ancestors have fought for you,
To become the motherland of Armenians.

Chorus I:
Be forever glorious, hero of Armenia,
You are a brilliant forger of buildings,
With Stalin's holy alliance of the people,
You flourish and create a bright future.

II
Immortal Lenin gave us an unrelenting fervour,
A dawn of fortune shone upon us,
Great Stalin from destruction saved us
And gave us a new, free and glorious life.

Chorus II:
Be forever glorious, reborn Armenia,
You are a brilliant forger of buildings,
With Stalin's holy alliance of the people,
You flourish and create a bright future.

III
Great Russia lent us a fraternal hand,
We've built a strong and new state,
No enemy can bring to its knees
Our ancient unshakeable people.

Chorus III:
Be forever glorious, Soviet Armenia,
You are a brilliant forger of buildings,
With Stalin's holy alliance of the people,
You flourish and create a bright future.

== Restoration attempts ==
The anthem has always maintained simultaneous public support and displeasure in Armenia. There have been attempts to restore the anthem's melody with new lyrics as the new national anthem of Armenia, similar to the case with the national anthem of Russia in 2000 during the early years of the presidency of Vladimir Putin. Some Armenian composers and artists have long disliked the uncomplicated theme of the current national anthem "Mer Hayreniq", and have expressed a desire for a more solemn tune, while others have stated that singing "Mer Hayrenik" itself has carried too much sorrow throughout the 20th and 21st centuries and that a more joyous alternative should be chosen. In 2019, National Assembly vice-speaker Alen Simonyan claimed that most Armenians do not like the current anthem. Eurasianet reported in 2019 that the current anthem remains unpopular with many Armenians, mainly for aesthetic reasons.

In 2005, the issue of changing the national anthem was discussed in government, which culminated in a constitutional referendum on adopting new state symbols within one year (by 6 December 2006). In early 2006, a competition for a new anthem was held by Minister of Culture Hasmik Poghosyan. The competition received 85 entries, and in August the commission shortlisted five, which did not include "Mer Hayrenik" but included a proposal with the music of the anthem of the Armenian SSR and lyrics by Armen Soghomonyan. This proposal won the competition, but the commission members rejected the submitted lyrics, urging local authors to submit better ones. While several Armenian music and arts figures were indifferent to or supportive of the change to the music, the results of the competition were eventually scrapped in October, after strong opposition from the Armenian Revolutionary Federation (or "Dashnaks"), then a member of the ruling coalition, throughout over the selection of a Soviet-era song. The government instead adopted a draft law that would keep "Mer Hayreniq" as the anthem for at least one more year. The adoption of the law was after the 6 December 2006 date set late the year prior as the constitutional deadline for reaffirming the existing state symbol.

In 2012, actor Sos Sargsyan, writer Levon Ananyan and publicist Zori Balayan sent an open letter with 2,208 signatures to the president petitioning to restore the Soviet-era coat of arms designed by painter Martiros Saryan and the anthem composed by Aram Khachaturyan. Ananyan stated, "... this is an issue that’s always important and has to always be raised, it’s the face of our country, our symbols that have to be representative and impressive." Political historian Shushan Khatlamajyan, the widow of the painter who restored Armenia's current coat of arms, opposed the restoration of the anthem, stating that people were trying to return "symbols of a period when they had a good life" and attributed Russia's Soviet-era anthem restoration to "pro-empire aspirations", stating, "... what do we want to achieve by trying to bring back fragments from our past?" while director of the Martin Saryan House-Museum Ruzan Saryan, Martin's granddaughter, supported it, stating, "... viewing the masterpieces by Saryan and Khachaturyan through the prism of ‘totalitarian past’ is medieval prejudice.”

In 2015, Chairman of the Composers' Union of Armenia Aram Satyan criticised the current Armenian anthem's sad impression and stated that the tone of the music should rise and become upbeat in the process. He stated, "In the case of other nations’ anthems we see some grandeur as it rises to the space, and ours on the contrary is directed to the earth… We can restore Aram Khachaturian’s music or use the Hayastan song composed by Gabriel Yeranyan in 2012."

In 2018, the House-Museum of Aram Khachaturian proposed for the national anthem to be changed to one based on the music of that of the Armenian SSR, composed by Khachaturian. This petition was not supported at the time in Armenia, which was dealing with the 2018 Armenian protests and revolution.

In 2019, another suggestion to adopt a national anthem based on the music of the anthem of the Armenian SSR was put forward by vice-speaker of the National Assembly Alen Simonyan. In a Facebook post, he stated that it is "a powerful anthem that meets all the requirements." His comment received support from composer Ara Gevorgyan, who replied, "It is a great hymn and we look forward to the decision to restore it." Simonyan subsequently created a Facebook poll, in which two-thirds of more than 6,500 respondents voted in favour of the change. Minister of Diaspora Babken Ter-Grigoryan responded by stating that he would survey the Armenian diaspora on the potential change. With Armenia's new parliament under Nikol Pashinyan seated just three weeks prior, many among the Armenian public responded by saying it was not a pressing issue at the time. A member of the Armenian Revolutionary Federation again expressed strong opposition to the idea.

=== Proposed text ===
Armenian original

I
Արարատյան սուրբ աշխարհ իմ Հայաստան
Բազում դարեր դաժան ճամփա դու անցար
Նահատակված որդիներիդ սուրբ արյամբ՝
Դու փառապանծ Մայր Հայրենիք Հայության։

Կրկներգ․
Փա՛ռք քեզ միշտ փա՛ռք Նոյի օրրան Հայաստան
Հանճար Բառով արարչագործ-շինարար
Սուրբ Վարդանի օրհնած սրով անսասան՝
Դու ապրում ես հավիտյանս հավիտյան։

II
Քրիստոս Աստծո անմահությամբ կնքված՝
Արքայության դռներն՝ ահա մեր դեմ բաց
Խավարային կապանքներից ազատված՝
Դարերով մեր ինքնությունն է հաստատված։

Կրկներգ

III
Դըրախտային այս սրբազան օրրանում
Մենք կերտեցինք ամրակուռ մի ինքնություն
Մահվան դիմաց՝ միշտ աներեր անկոտրում
Իմացյալ մահվամբ դեպի անմահություն։

Կրկներգ

Transliteration

I
Araratyan surb ashkharh im Hayastan
Bazum darer dazhan campha du antsar
Nahatakvatz ordinerid surb aryamb,
Du pharrapantz Mayr Hayreniq Hayuthyan.

Krknerg:
Pharrq qez misht pharrq Noyi orran Hayastan
Hancar Barrov ararchagortz-shinarar
Surb Vardani orhnatz srov ansasan,
Du aprum yes havityans havityan.

II
Qristos Asttzo anmahuthyamb knqvatz,
Arqayuthyan drrnern aha mer dem bats
Khavarayin kapanqnerits azatvatz,
Darerov mer inqnuthyunn e hastatvatz.

Krknerg

III
Dėrakhtayin ays srbazan orranum
Menq kertetsinq amrakurr mi inqnuthyun
Mahvan dimatz misht anerer ankotrum
Imatsyal mahvamb depi anmahuthyun.

Krknerg

IPA transcription

1
[a.ɾa.ɾat̪.ˈjan suɾb aʃ.ˈxɑɾʰ im ha.jas.ˈt̪an |]
[ba.ˈzum d̪a.ˈɾeɾ d̪a.ˈʒan t͡ʃam.ˈpʰa d̪u an.ˈt͡sʰaɾ |]
[na.ha.t̪ak.ˈvat͡s voɾ.d̪i.ne.ˈɾid̪ suɾb aɾ.ˈjamb |]
[d̪u pʰa.ra.ˈpant͡s majɾ haj.ɾe.ˈnikʰ ha.jut̪ʰ.ˈjan ǁ]

[kəɾk.ˈneɾɡ]
[pʰarkʰ kʰez | miʃt̪ pʰarkʰ | no.ˈji oɾ.ˈɾan ha.jas.ˈt̪an |]
[han.ˈt͡ʃaɾ ba.ˈrov | a.ɾaɾ.t͡ʃʰa.ˈɡoɾt͡s ʃi.na.ˈɾaɾ |]
[suɾb vaɾ.d̪a.ˈni oɾ.hə.ˈnat͡s sɾov an.sa.ˈsan |]
[d̪u a.ˈpɾum jes ha.vi.ˈt̪jans ha.vi.ˈt̪jan ‖]

2
[kʰɾis.t̪os ast̪.ˈt͡so an.ma.hut̪ʰ.ˈjamb kəŋ.kʰə.ˈvat͡s |]
[aɾ.kʰa.ju.ˈt̪ʰjan d̪ər.ˈneɾn | a.ˈha meɾ d̪em bat͡sʰ |]
[xa.va.ɾa.ˈjin ka.paŋkʰ.ne.ˈɾit͡sʰ a.zat̪.ˈvat͡s |]
[d̪a.ɾe.ˈɾov meɾ iŋkʰ.nu.t̪ʰjun.n‿e has.t̪at̪.ˈvat͡s ‖]

[kəɾk.ˈneɾɡ]

3
[d̪ə.ɾax.t̪a.ˈjin ajs səɾ.ba.ˈzan oɾ.ɾa.ˈnum |]
[meŋkʰ keɾ.t̪e.ˈt͡sʰiŋkʰ am.ɾa.ˈkur mi iŋkʰ.nu.ˈt̪ʰjun |]
[maɦ.ˈvan d̪i.ˈmat͡sʰ | miʃt̪ a.ne.ˈɾeɾ | aŋ.kot̪.ˈɾum |]
[i.mat͡sʰ.jal maɦ.ˈvamb d̪e.ˈpi an.ma.hu.t̪ʰjun ‖]

[kəɾk.ˈneɾɡ]

Russian translation

I
Святая земля Арарата, моя Армения,
За множество веков суровый путь ты прошла,
Твои сыновья пролили святую кровь,
Чтоб ты прославилась как мать-родина для армян.

Припев:
Слава тебе, всегда — слава, колыбель Ноя Армения,
Гениальная словом, мастерица-строительница,
Непоколебимая, как меч, благословлённый святым Варданом,
Здравствуй во веки веков!

II
Запечатлевшие бессмертие Христа Бога,
Пред нами открылись врата царства,
Освободившись от оков тьмы,
Наше государство крепло на протяжении веков.

Припев

III
В священной колыбели судьбы
Мы создали крепкое государство,
Перед лицом вечно беспощадной смерти непоколебимое,
Прошедшее путь от смерти к бессмертию!

Припев

English translation

I
Holy Land of Araratian Armenia,
For centuries you've crossed brutal pathways.
By the holy blood of your martyred sons,
You're always a glorious motherland to all Armenians!

Chorus:
Glory to you always, hearth of Noah, Armenia,
In your divine wisdom, in your creative–genius!
By the blessed, steadfast sword of Saint Vardan,
You live on and on, forever and ever.

II
Sealed by immortality of Christ the Lord,
The kingdom's doors are open to us.
Delivered to us from dark yokes,
We've proved our identity for ages.

Chorus

III
In this holy land, where once was a paradise,
We've edified our firm, unbending image,
Facing death with conscious heroism,
Marching through to eternal life.

Chorus
