= Hayrenik =

Hayrenik may refer to:

- Hairenik, Armenian-language publication in Watertown, Massachusetts
- "Mer Hayrenik", the national anthem of Armenia
- Azat Hayrenik or Free Fatherland, an Armenian political party in Artsakh (Karabakh)
