= Gayrabetov Mansion =

Building in Rostov Oblast, Russia

- Особняк Гайрабетовых
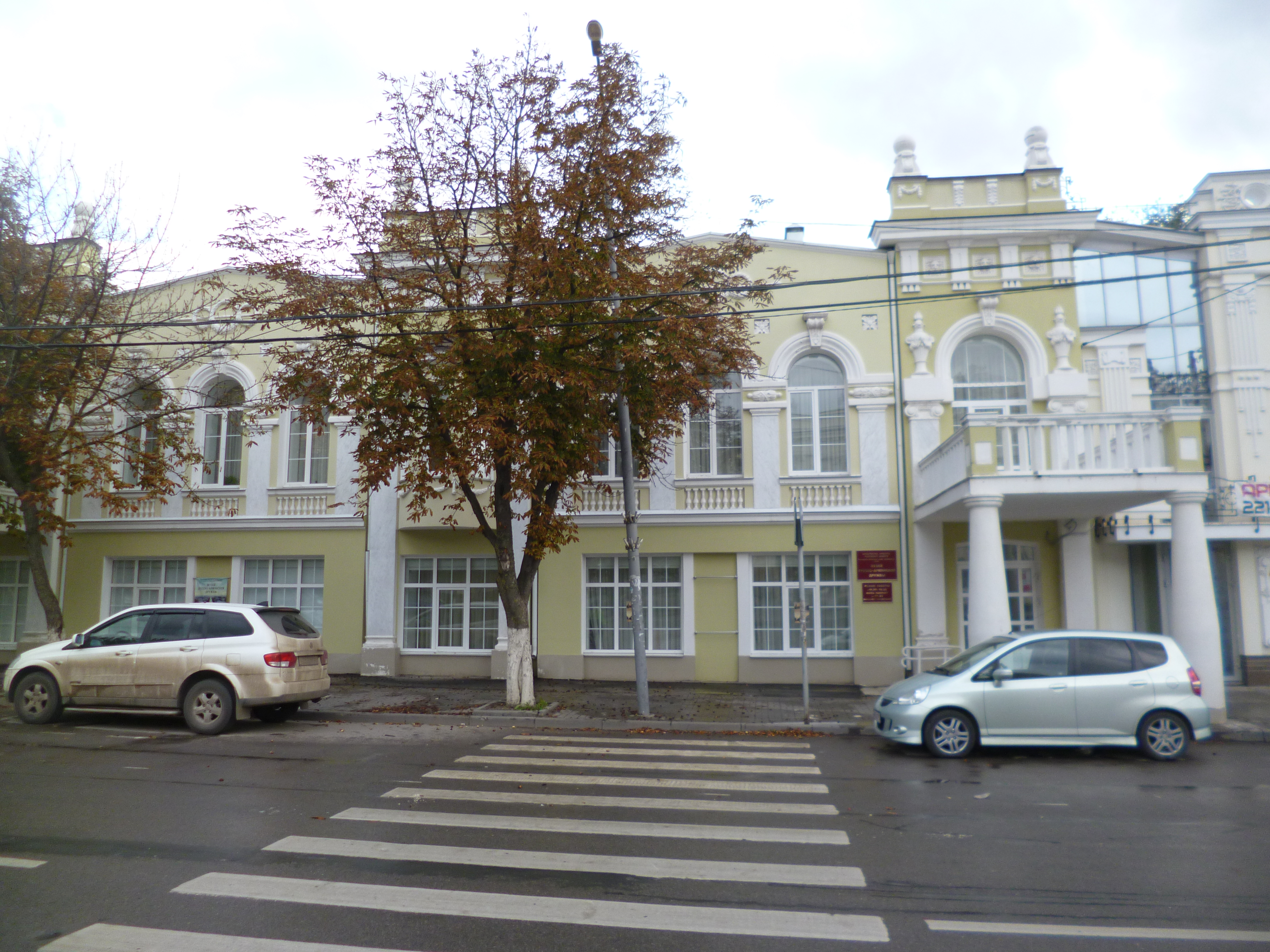
- 47°13′44″N 39°45′54″E
- Location: No 14, Liberty Square, Rostov-on-Don
- Beginning date: 1880
- Completion date: 1880

The Gayrabetov Mansion (Russian: Особняк Гайрабетовых) is a building in Rostov-on-Don, located on Liberty Square. The house was built in 1880. Initially it belonged to the relatives of merchant Karp Gayrabetov. At the beginning of the 20th century, the building was acquired by the manufacturer Mark Iskidarov. Since 2011, the Museum of Russian-Armenian Friendship has been located in the mansion. The Gayrabetov Mansion has the status of an object of cultural heritage of regional significance.

== History ==
The mansion was built in 1880 at the expense of the heirs of merchant Karp Gayrabetov in the city of Nakhichevan-on-Don (now part of the Proletarsky District of Rostov-on-Don). At the beginning of the 20th century, the mansion was acquired by the manufacturer and director of the Nakhichevan City Public Bank, Mark Iskidarov, who reconstructed the building.

In 1920 the building was nationalized. For a time it housed the "Vrubel" Nakhichevan Art School, founded by the writer Marietta Shaginyan and her sister Magdalina. At the end of the 1920s, the ground floor of the mansion housed the Pushkin City Library, and the upper floor housed the Pioneer Club. During the Great Patriotic War, the roof of the building and the facade were partially damaged. In 1947, the building was transferred to the library. In the 1950s, a large balcony-canopy covering the entire width of the sidewalk at the main entrance was dismantled. By the end of the 2000s, the building was in poor condition and needed repair.

In 2007, the Holy Cross Church was returned to the Armenian Apostolic Church. The Museum of Russian-Armenian Friendship, which had previously occupied the church building, was moved to the Gayrabetov Mansion. Renovations to the mansion took place, and were completed in 2011. On 25 November 2011 the Museum of Russian-Armenian Friendship was reopened.

== Architecture and design ==
The two-story brick mansion has an L-shaped configuration in plan. Different styles are combined in the architecture and design of the building's facades. The recessed facades are completed by entablatures and attics.

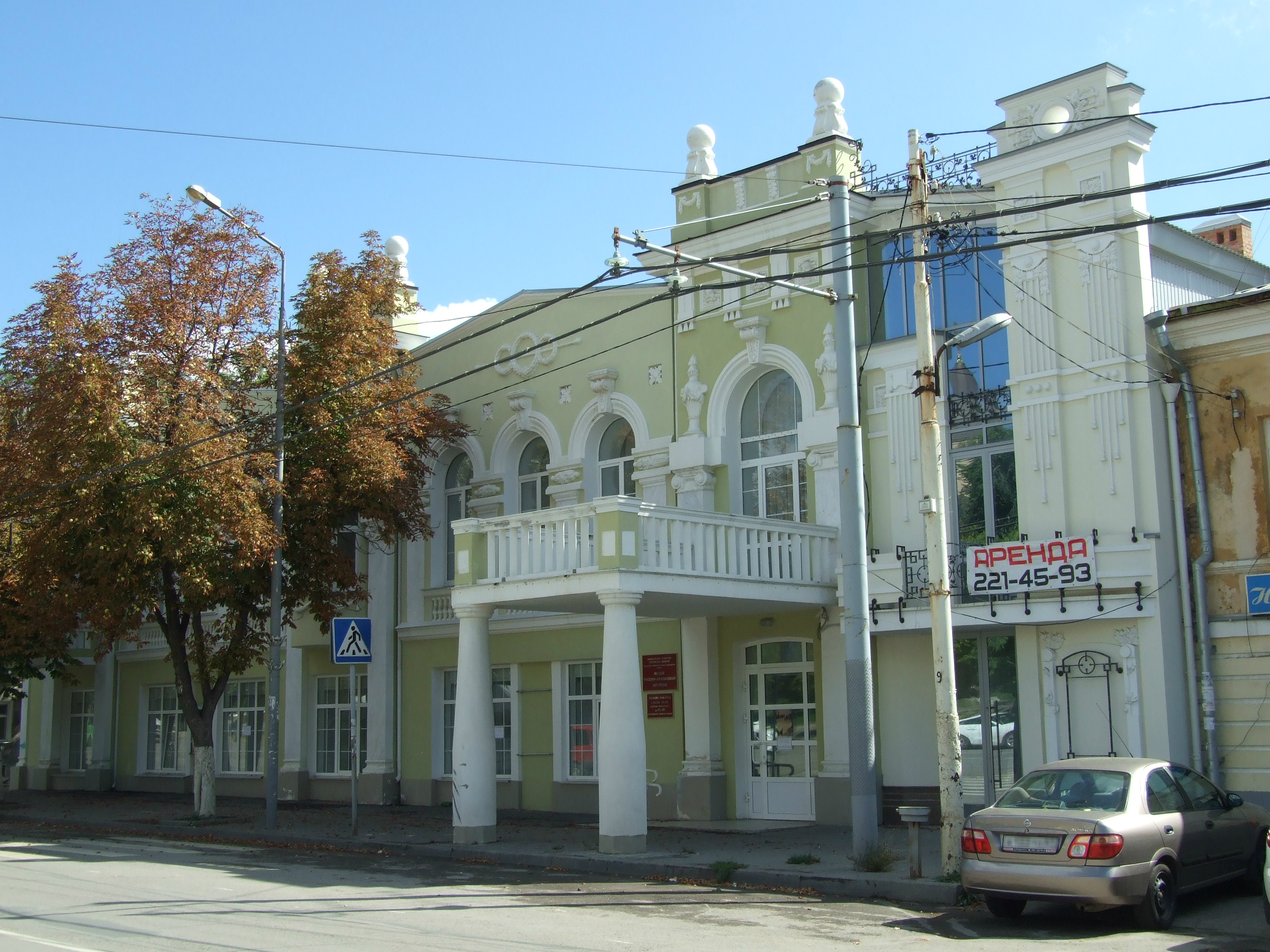

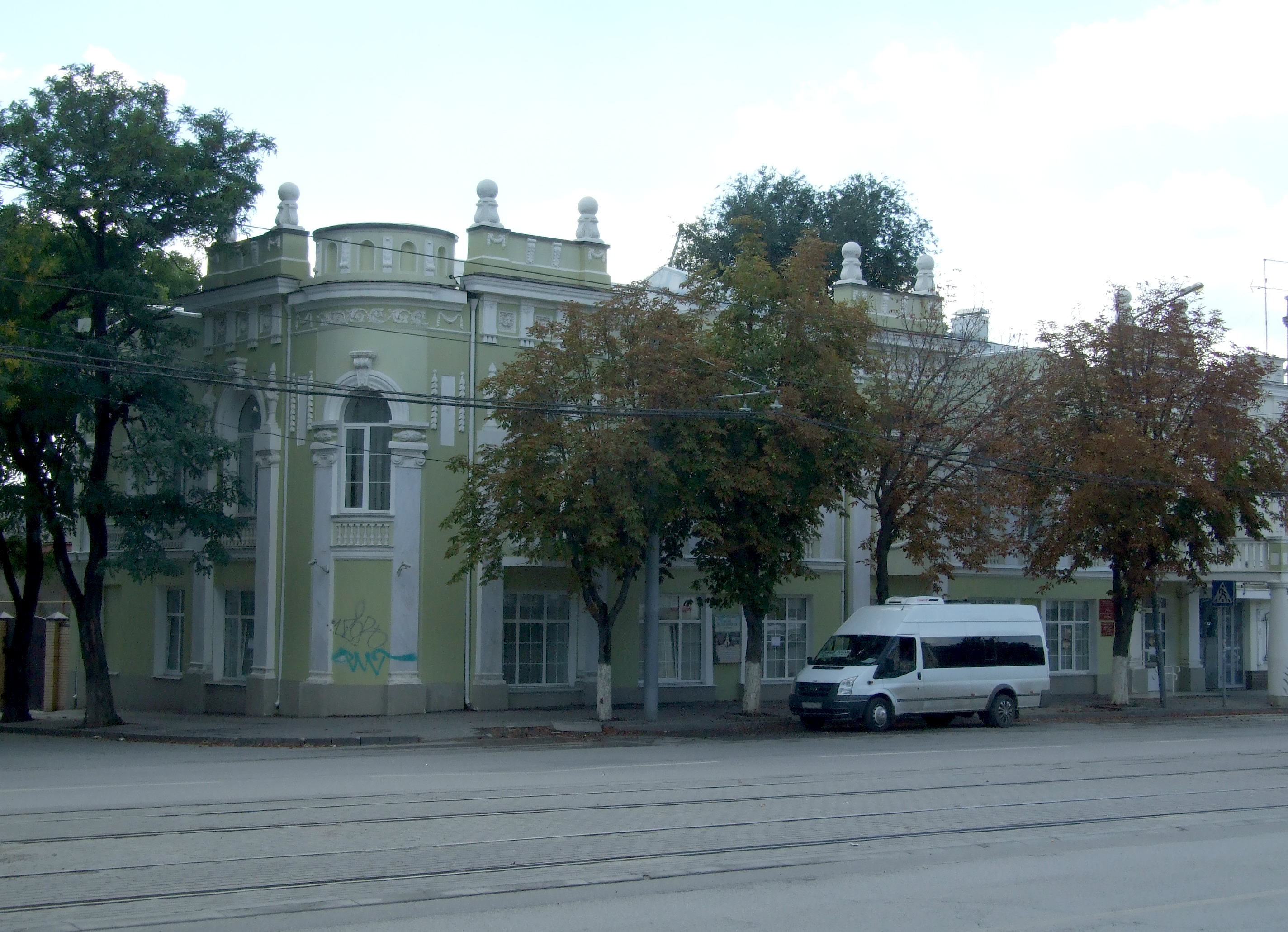
