= Parsegh Ganatchian =

Lebanese-Armenian musician

- Բարսեղ Կանաչեան
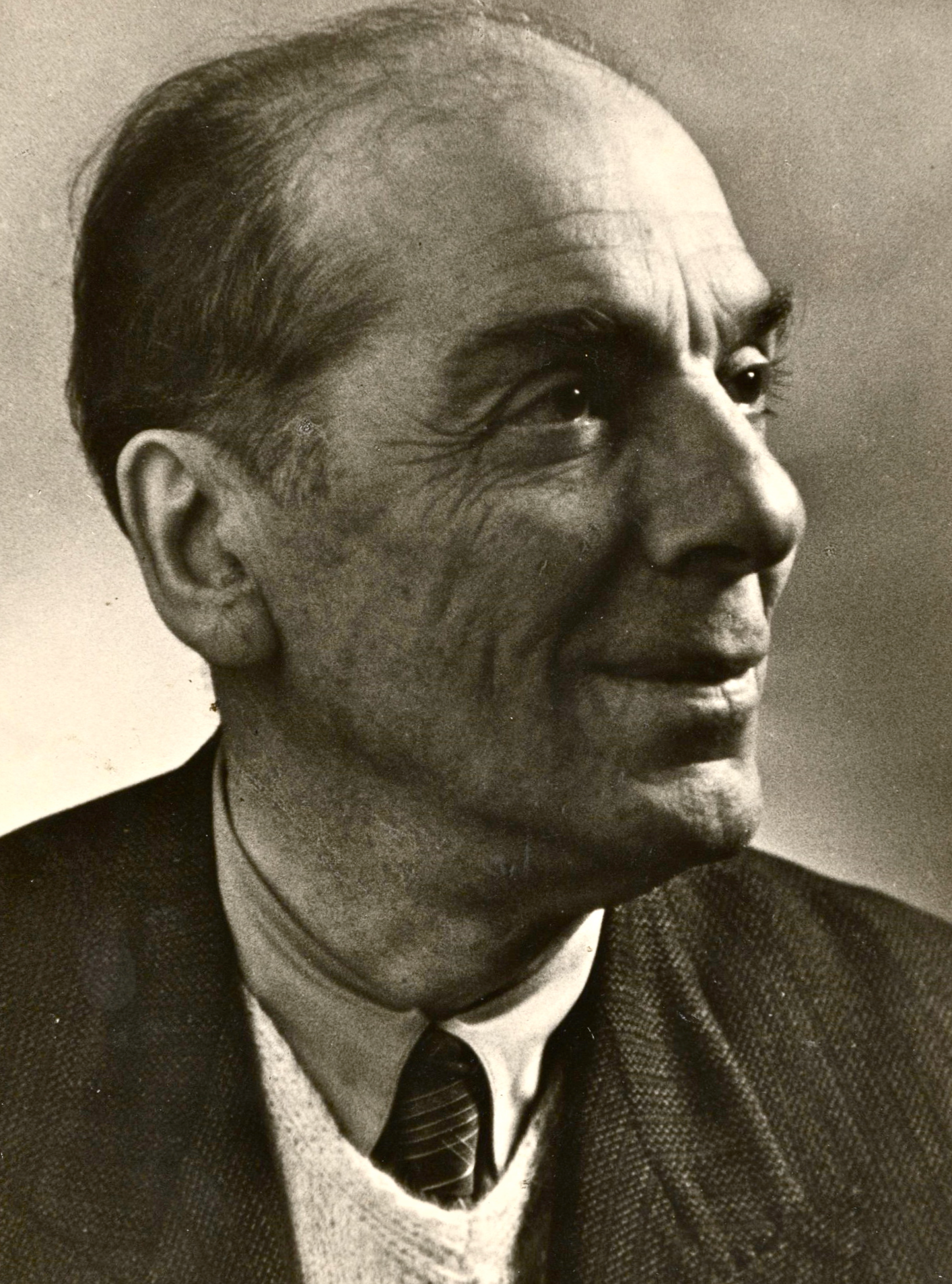
- Born: 17 April 1885; Rodosto, Ottoman Empire (present-day Tekirdağ, Turkey)
- Died: 21 May 1967 (aged 82); Beirut, Lebanon
- Occupations: Composer[[]]; Conductor
- Known for: Arranger of the music of "Mer Hayrenik", the Armenian national anthem

Parsegh Ganatchian (Note: Western Armenian: Բարսեղ Կանաչեան, romanized: Parsegh Ganachʻean; Armenian: Բարսեղ Կանաչյան, romanized: Barsegh Kanachʻyan) (17 April 1885 – 21 May 1967) was an Armenian composer, conductor, and sociocultural activist. He is best-known for his part in arranging the music to Mer Hayrenik (Our Fatherland), the Armenian national anthem. He comes from a modest background; his father was a shoemaker.

== Career ==
Ganatchian was born in Rodosto (present-day Tekirdağ), in the Ottoman Empire. In 1888 his family moved to Constantinople (present-day Istanbul), where he received his primary education in Gedikpaşa Armenian school. Hamidian Massacres forced the family to move to Bulgaria, through Sliven to Varna, where he studied music theory, took lessons in the violin and conducting lessons under the supervision of Natanbeg Amirkhanyan. In 1903, Ganatchian studied playing the piano and harmony in Bucharest, returning to Istanbul in 1908, where he formed the "Knar" wind orchestra (in Armenian «Քնար»). His meeting with Komitas Vardapet in December 1910 was a decisive milestone in his career. Ganatchian also established the "Gusan" Choir, while continuing his education in harmony and conducting.

In 1919, he conducted a concert dedicated to Komitas and his works with 300 singers and musicians. Starting in 1920, Ganatchian continued his musical education in Paris, France, and from 1922 worked in conducting in various Armenian diaspora venues.

In 1928, he moved to Nicosia, Cyprus, where he taught music at the prestigious Melkonian Educational Institute and from 1933 at Neshan Palandjian College (Djemaran) in Beirut, Lebanon. In 1936, he established the "Gusan" Choir, which he directed and conducted personally. The activities of the choir continued until 1961 under his direction in Beirut, Lebanon. Its first concert was in the American University of Beirut Memorial Hall, where 70 male and female singers took part. "Gusan" has had recitals in many venues in Lebanon, Syria and Egypt and its repertoire also included in addition to Armenian national, folkloric and spiritual songs, songs occasionally in other languages including Arabic, Kurdish etc. In 1936, a music association named «Գուսան երաժշտասիրաց միութիւն» was also formed for encouraging the project and developing love of music and its propagation amongst the Armenians.

The Lebanese government awarded him the National Order of the Cedar for promoting friendship between the Armenian and Lebanese peoples. He also received Ordre des Palmes académiques from the French Government.

Ganatchian died on 21 May 1967 in Beirut, Lebanon. The Armenian cultural association Hamazkayin established an arts institute carrying his name in Lebanon.
