= Harutyun Alamdaryan =

- Born: 25 January [O.S. 14 November] 1795; Astrakhan, Russian Empire
- Died: 1834 (aged 38–39); Nakhichevan-on-Don, Russian Empire
- Occupations: Poet and teacher
- Known for: First director of Lazarian Seminary

Harutyun Alamdaryan (Armenian: Յարութիւն Ալամդարեան; (Note: Reformed orthography: Հարություն Ալամդարյան) birth name Gevorg; 25 January [O.S. 14 November] 1795 – 1834, Nor Nakhijevan) was an Armenian poet and teacher.

== Biography ==
In 1813 he was invited to Moscow where he became the first director of Lazarian seminary. From 1824 to 1830, he was the director of Nersisian Armenian school in Tiflis. Being a supporter of Nerses Ashtaraketsi, in 1830 he was exiled to Haghpat Monastery. From 1832 to 1834, he lived in Holy Cross Church, Nakhichevan on Don, where he was killed.

Alamdaryan was the teacher of Khachatur Abovian and Stepanos Nazarian. He was the author of many poems and an Armenian-Russian vocabulary.

== Sources ==
- "Հարություն Ալամդարյան — LitoPedia".
- "Anunner.com - HARUTYUN (GEVorg) ALAMDARYAN".
