= Sarmen =

Soviet Armenian poet (1901–1984)

- Սարմեն
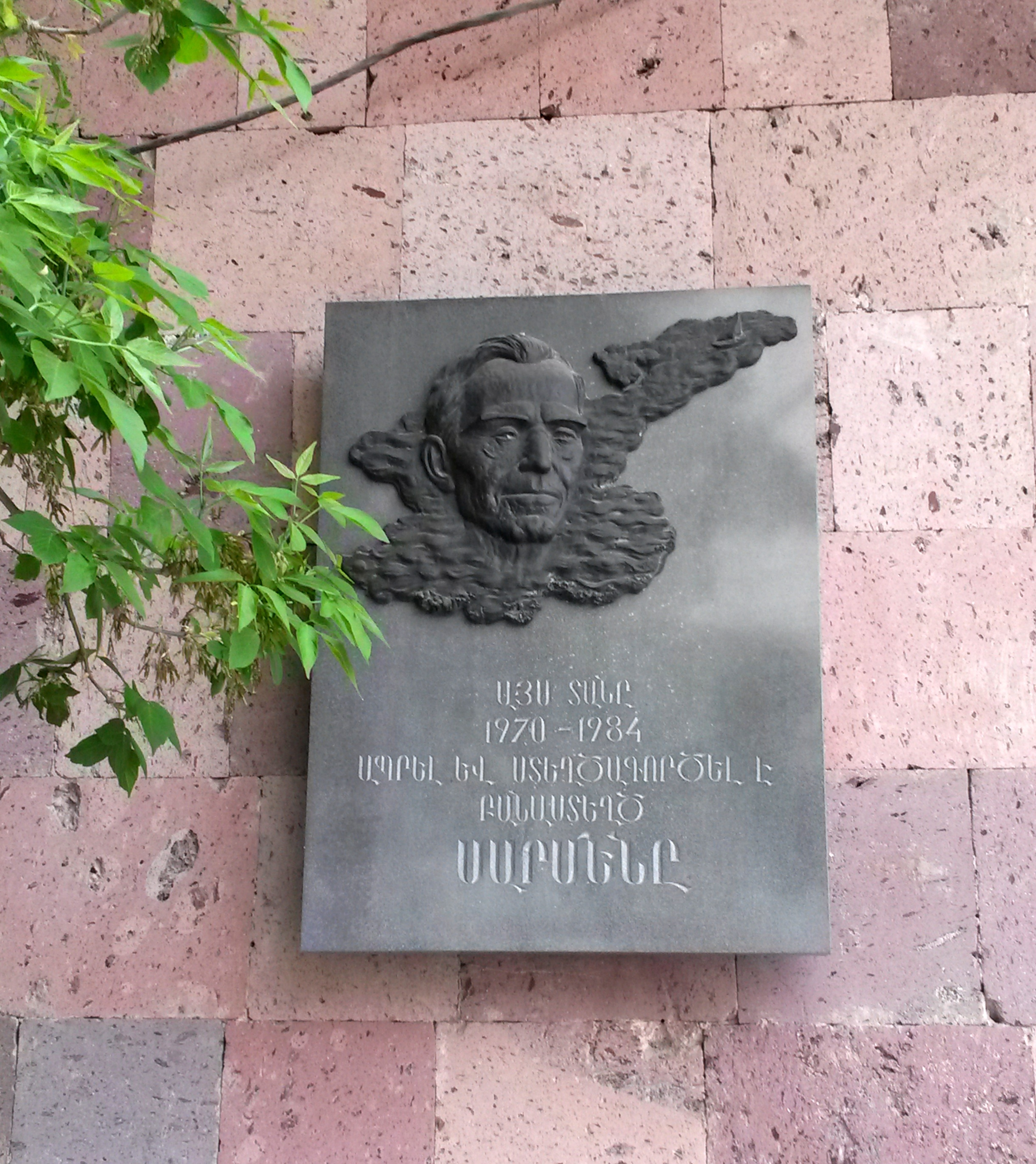
- Sarmen's plaque in Yerevan, Armenia
- Born: Armenak Sarkisyan; March 1, 1901; Pakhvants, Gevaş, Van Province, Ottoman Empire
- Died: February 18, 1984 (aged 82); Yerevan, Armenian SSR, Soviet Union
- Occupations: Poet, writer
- Writing career
- Language: Armenian

Sarmen (Armenian: Սարմեն), pseudonym of Armenak Sarkisyan (Armenian: Արմենակ Սարգսյան; 1 March [O.S. 16 February] 1901 – 18 February 1984) was a Soviet Armenian poet.

He wrote the lyrics to the Anthem of the Armenian Soviet Socialist Republic which remained in use from 1944 to 1991 in the Armenian SSR.

== Early life and education ==
Sarmen was born in Pakhvants village, Western Armenia, in 1901. He lost his parents during the Armenian genocide and spent some time in orphanage. He lived in Gandzak, Tzaghkadzor, Leninakan and Yerevan.

In 1924, Sarmen graduated from Leninakan’s children’s technical school and became a teacher. In 1932, Sarmen graduated from Yerevan State University.

== Career ==
Sarmen started publishing his poems in 1919.

He became a member of the Union of Writers of the USSR in 1934 and a member of the Communist Party of the Soviet Union in 1941. He wrote several collections of poems, such as “The Fields Smile” (1925), “Flight” (1935), “The Land of Songs” (1940), “Motherland” (1944), “Father’s House” (1955), “Lights of Sorrow” (1957), “Armenian Heart” (1960), and “My Dreams” (1969). He also wrote poems for children and translated works from Russian, Georgian, and other languages into Armenian. From 1924 he taught children to read and write, many of whom were orphans with a fate similar to his own

His poetry was characterized by romanticism, patriotism, optimism and an appeal to the traditions of Armenian folk epic. He was the author of the text of the state anthem of the Armenian SSR.

== Honors and awards ==
Sarmen was awarded the title of Honored Cultural Figure of the Armenian SSR in 1967. He also received three orders and several medals for his work, including Order of the Red Star, Order of the Badge of Honour, and the Order of the October Revolution.
