= Stepanos Nazarian =

Armenian-Russian historian and publisher

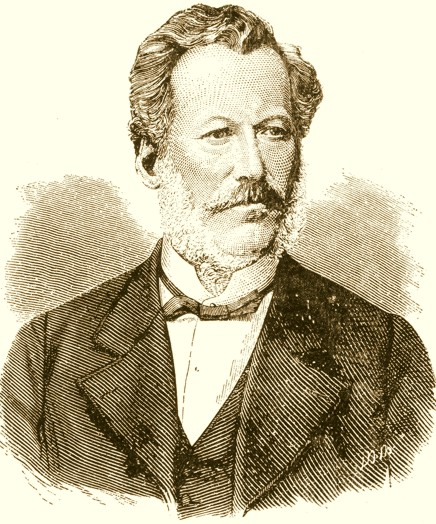
- Stepanos Nazarian
- Born: May 27, 1812; Tiflis, Russian Empire
- Died: May 9, 1879 (aged 66); Moscow, Russian Empire
- Education: University of Tartu
- Occupations: publisher, enlightener, historian of literature and orientalist
- Organization: Lazarev Institute of Oriental Languages

Stepanos Nazarian or Nazariants (Armenian: Ստեփանոս Նազարեան, Russian: Степанос Исаевич Назарян, 27 May [O.S. 15 May] 1812 – 9 May [O.S. 27 April] 1879) was a Russian Armenian publisher, enlightener, literary historian and Orientalist.

== Biography ==
Stepanos Nazarian was born in 1812 into the family of a priest who had moved to Tiflis (modern-day Tbilisi, Georgia, then in the Russian Empire) from Khoy in northwestern Iran. He received his earliest education at home from a local cleric. In 1824, he entered the newly founded Nersisian School, where he was influenced by his teacher Harutiun Alamdarian and his fellow student Khachatur Abovian. He excelled at the Nersisian School and learned Russian, Persian and French in addition to Armenian. With the help of Abovian and the latter's mentor Friedrich Parrot, Nazarian entered the Dorpat gymnasium (in modern-day Tartu, Estonia) in 1833, becoming its first Armenian student. There, he prepared for enrollment in the University of Dorpat, which he entered in 1835. The University of Dorpat served as entry point for German philosophy and Orientalism into Russia and was connected to contemporary programs for socio-economic reform. It became an important center for the education of a new generation of Armenian intellectuals and educators. Nazarian received funding for his education from both the state and private Armenian benefactors. Initially intending to receive an education in medicine, he switched to the faculty of philosophy since he was unable to receive state funding as a medical student. He studied a variety of subjects at the university, focusing on history, philology, Russian, German and classical languages and literature. He graduated from the department of philosophy of the University of Dorpat in 1840.

From 1842 to 1849 he served as head of the Armenian language department of the University of Kazan. He defended his master's thesis in 1846 and received a doctoral degree in 1849 for his dissertation on Ferdowsi's Shahnameh. In 1849 he became a professor of Persian and Arab literature at the Lazarev Institute of Oriental Languages in Moscow.

Under the influence of the European enlightenment movement and the Russian social movement of the 1840s, Nazarian increasingly began writing against the feudal system and its ideology. In the 1850s he became the leader of the Armenian enlightenment movement. Between 1858 and 1864 he published in Moscow the influential magazine Hyusisapayl (Aurora Borealis), that had a great effect on the development of progressive public thought in Armenia. He criticized serfdom and clerical power for the spiritual revival of the Armenian people; however, he refused to classify his actions as part of a broader class struggle. Nazarian advanced the idea of public education in the new enlightenment era as well as the replacement of Classical Armenian (grabar) with the new literary Modern Armenian. He was a supporter of deism and promoted Russian and foreign literature. He translated many of Friedrich Schiller's dramas.
