= Holy Cross Church, Rostov-on-Don =

Church in Russia

Holy Cross Church Սուրբ Խաչ Եկեղեցի
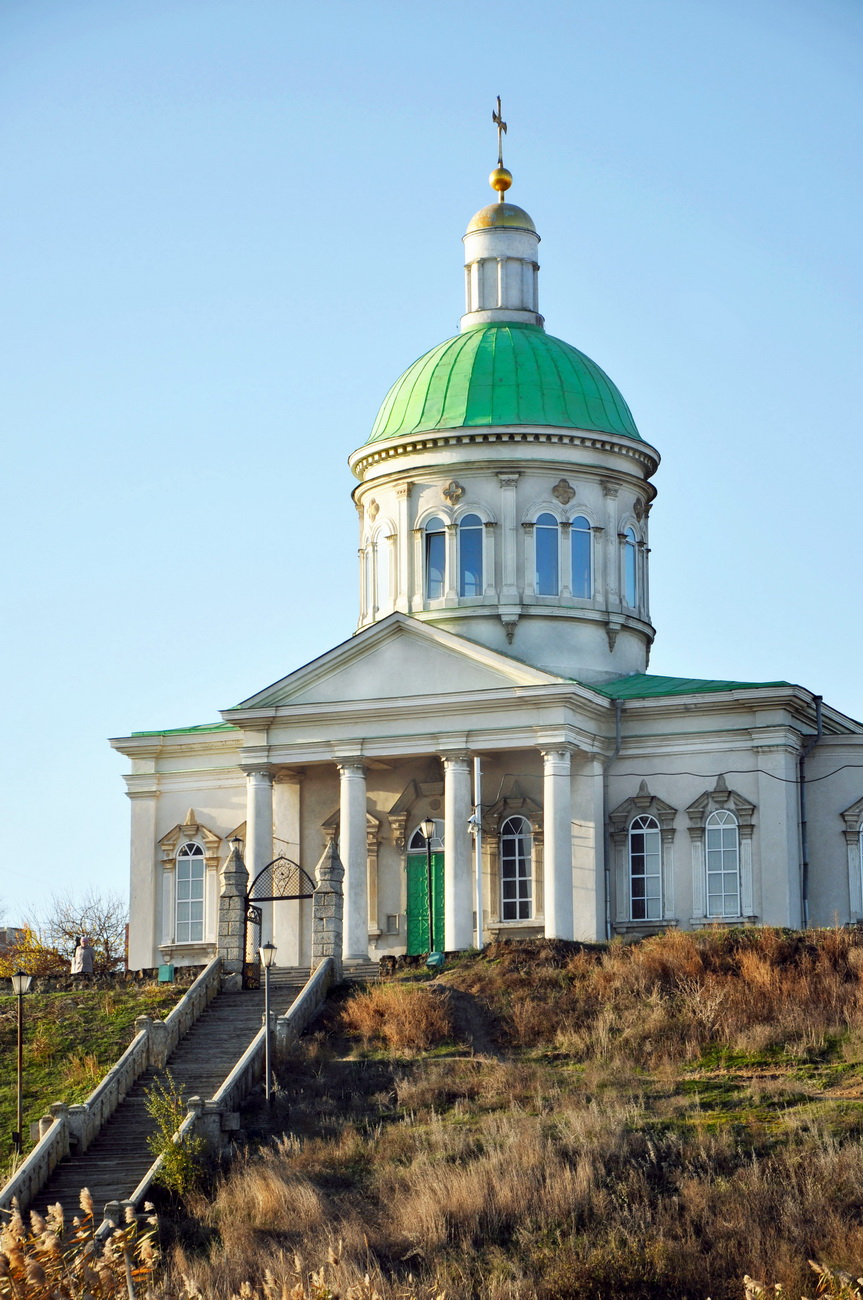
- Holy Cross Church, New Nakhichevan

- Location within Russia

Religion
- Affiliation: Armenian Apostolic Church
- Rite: Armenian

Location
- Location: Nor Nakhichevan, Rostov; Russia
- Coordinates: 47.29056804°N 39.72209662°E

Architecture
- Groundbreaking: 1786
- Completed: 1792

Surp Khach Church (Armenian: Սուրբ Խաչ Եկեղեցի [suɾpʰ χɑtʃʰ], Russian: Церковь Святого Креста, Holy Cross Church) is an 18th-century Armenian church in Nor Nakhichevan. It is the oldest surviving monument in the borders of Rostov-on-Don.

== History ==
The church was built in 1786–1792. In 1972, it was turned into a museum of Russian-Armenian friendship, but was reopened as an Armenian Apostolic Church in 2000.

The church is situated in the modern-day Voroshilovsky (North) rayon, on a high hill near the river. Several famous Armenian people like Harutyun Alamdaryan, Raphael Patkanian and Mikael Nalbandian are buried near the church.

== See also ==
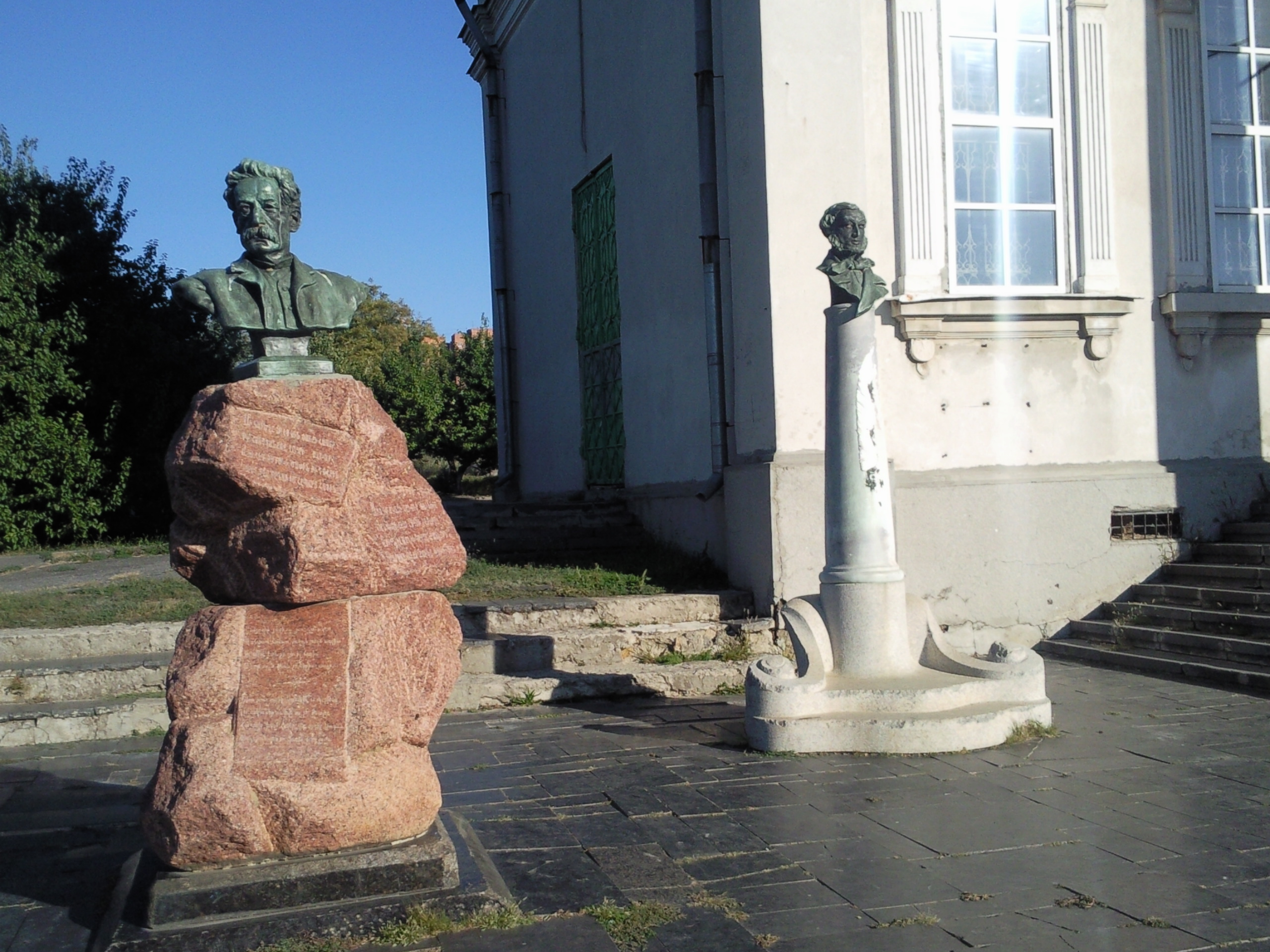
Patkanyan's (left) and Nalbandyan's graves

- Nakhichevan-on-Don
