= Nikolai Serno-Solovyevich =

Russian publicist and revolutionary

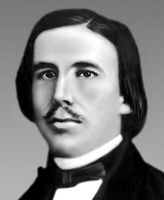
- Born: Николай Александрович Серно-Соловьевич; 13 December 1834; Saint Petersburg, Russian Empire
- Died: 14 February 1866 (aged 31); Irkutsk, Russian Empire
- Occupations: publicist, revolutionary

Nikolai Alexandrovich Serno-Solovyevich (Russian: Никола́й Алекса́ндрович Се́рно-Соловье́вич) (13 December 1834 in Saint Petersburg, Imperial Russia – 14 February 1866 in Irkutsk) was a Russian publicist and revolutionary who was one of the founders of the far-left organisation Zemlya i Volya.

A radical who rejected both the 1861 reforms and capitalism, seeing revolution as the only way forward for Russia, he was a regular correspondent to different publications of the Free Russian Press. A friend of Alexander Hertzen and Nikolai Ogaryov, as well as Nikolai Chernyshevsky, he became a pivotal link between the Saint Petersburg and the London centres of the Russian revolutionary movement. Arrested on 7 July 1862 alongside Chernyshevsky and taken to the Petropavlovskaya Fortress where he remained until 1865, Serno was deported to Siberia and died in 1866 in Irkutsk.
