= Nalbandyan, Armenia =

Village in Armavir, Armenia

Nalbandyan Նալբանդյան
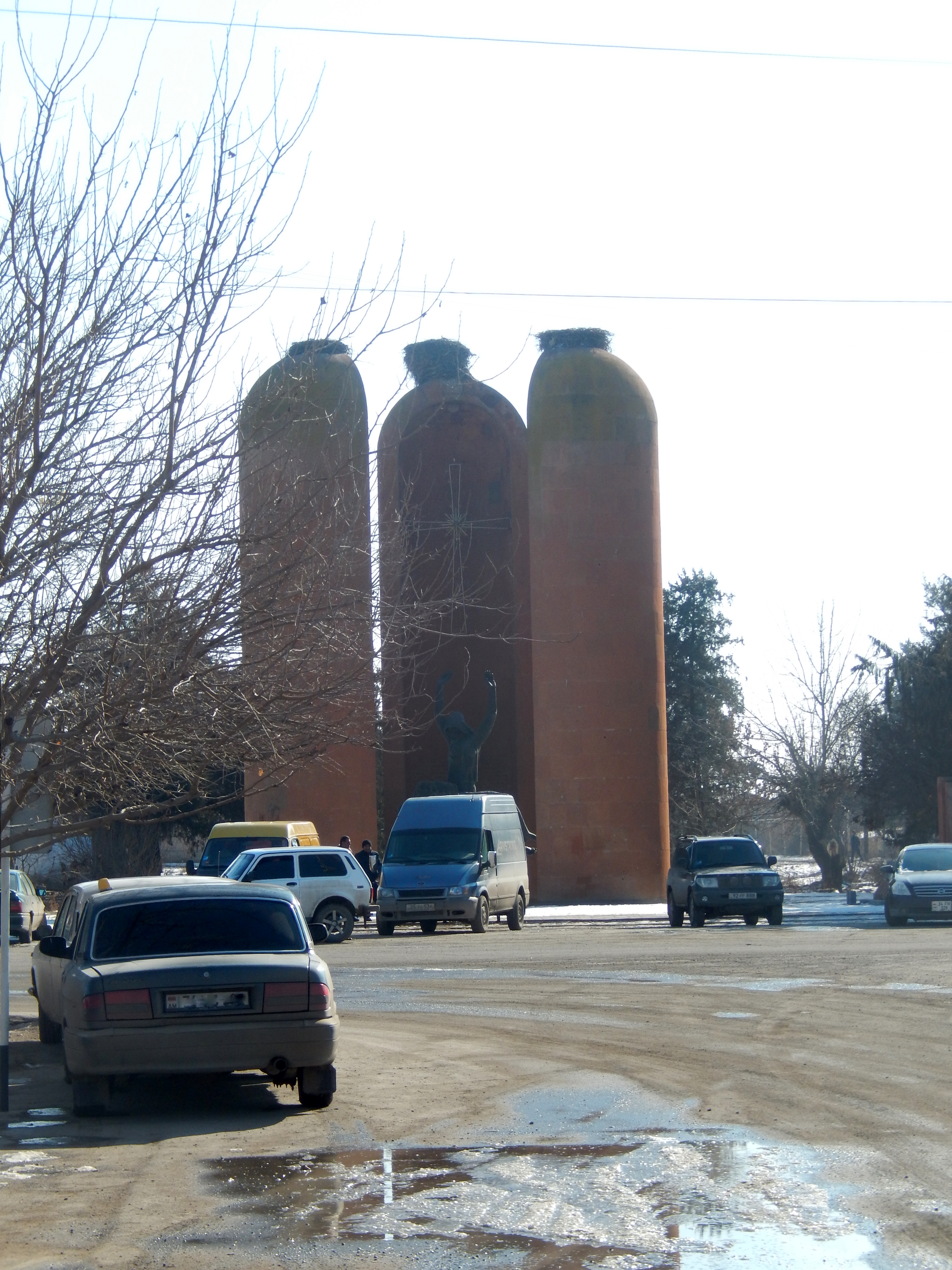
- Monument in Nalbandyan village, 2016

- Location within Armenia
- Coordinates: 40°04′04″N 43°59′08″E
- Country: Armenia
- Province: Armavir

Population (2011)
  - Total: 4,863
- Time zone: UTC+4 ( )
  - Summer (DST): UTC+5 ( )

Nalbandyan (Armenian: Նալբանդյան, also Romanized as Nalbandian; formerly Shahriar) is a village in the Armavir Province of Armenia near the Armenia–Turkey border. It is named after poet Mikael Nalbandian. 20% of the population (around 895 individuals) in Nalbandyan are from the Yazidi minority.
