= Hasmik Poghosyan =

Armenian politician

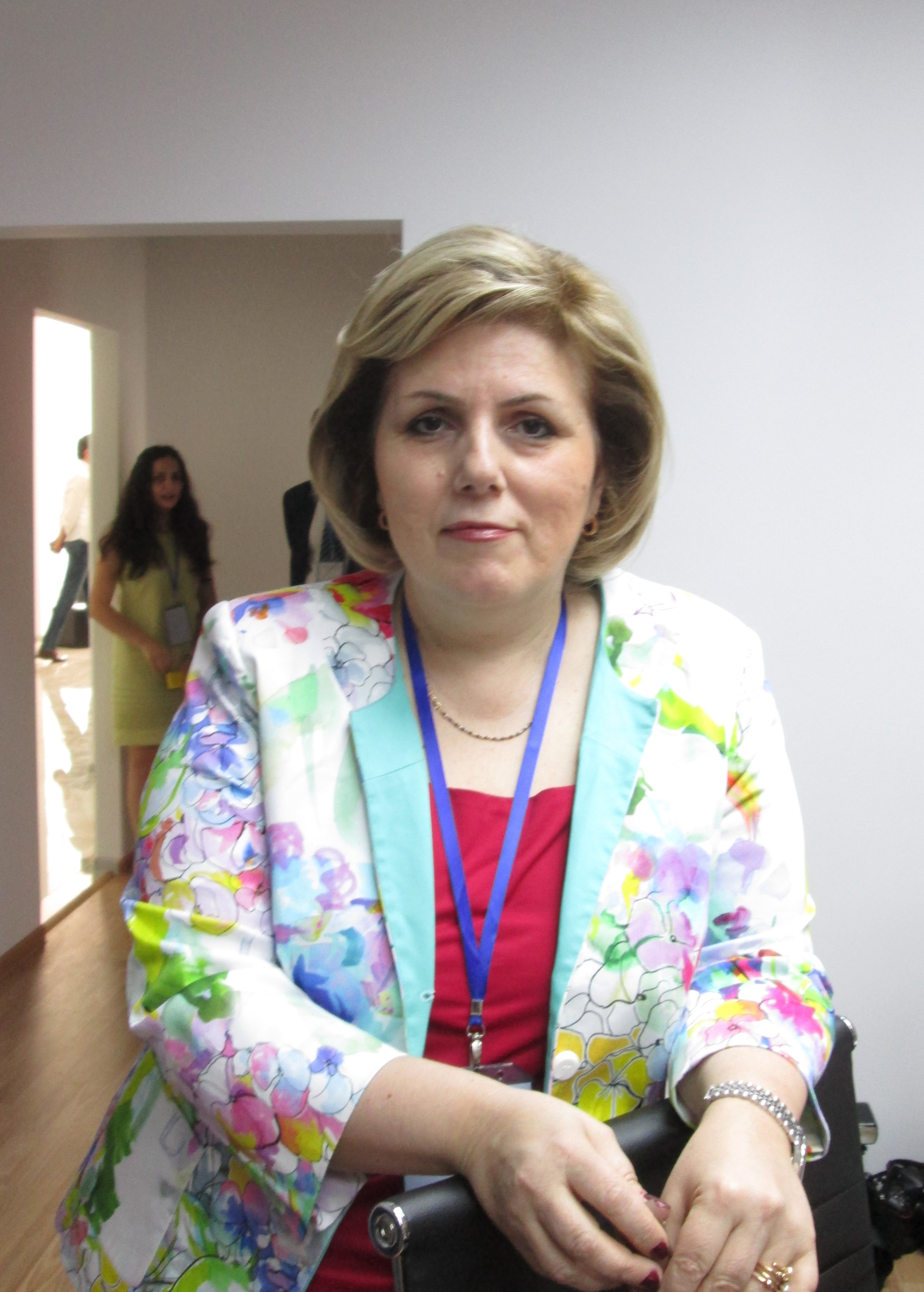
- Born: May 22, 1960 (age 65); Yerevan, Armenia
- Citizenship: Armenian
- Occupations: Armenian state and political figure
- Known for: Minister of Culture of RA (2006-2016)

Hasmik S. Poghosyan (Armenian: Հասմիկ Պողոսյան, May 22, 1960, Yerevan, Armenia), Armenian state and political figure, Minister of Culture of RA (2006-2016).

== Biography ==
Hasmik Poghosyan was born on 22 May 1960 in Yerevan in the family of Armenian historian and politician Stepan Pogosyan. She studied at Yerevan Secondary School after Alexander Pushkin and at Musical School after Sayat-Nova. In 1982 she graduated from Yerevan State University, biology department, from 1982-1985 she pursued her post-graduate studies at the Yerevan State University. From 1983-1993 Hasmik Poghosyan taught biology at the Yerevan Secondary School #182. 1986-2006 Hasmik Poghosyan worked at the Armenian Society of Cultural Relations and Cooperation with Foreign Countries, first as a referent, then - senior referent, head of a department, executive secretary, deputy chairperson and council chairperson. In 2006 she was appointed Minister of Culture and Youth of the RA.

== Awards ==
- Movses Khorenatsi medal (2011)
- The Prime Minister's souvenir (2014)
- 2nd degree medal for the merit of Fatherland (2015)
