= Mer Hayrenik =

National anthem of Armenia

Mer Hayreniq
English: 'Our Fatherland'
- Մեր Հայրենիք
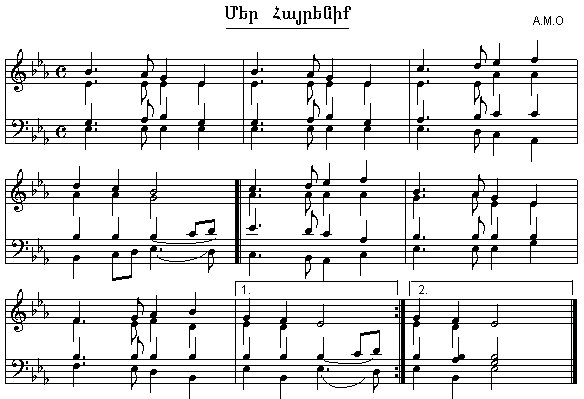
- Music score
- National anthem of Armenia
- Lyrics: Mikael Nalbandian, 1861
- Music: Parsegh Ganatchian, 1918
- Adopted: May 1918, 28; 108 years ago
- Readopted: July 1991, 01; 35 years ago
- Relinquished: March 1922, 12; 104 years ago
- Preceded by: Anthem of the Armenian Soviet Socialist Republic

Audio sample
- Instrumental rendition (single verse) performed by the U.S. Navy Band: file; help

"Our Fatherland" (Note: Armenian: Մեր Հայրենիք Mer Hayreniq) is the national anthem of Armenia. It was arranged by Parsegh Ganatchian; the lyrics were written by Mikayel Nalbandian. First adopted in 1918 as the anthem of the short-lived First Republic of Armenia, it was subsequently banned after the country was invaded by then incorporated into the Soviet Union. Following the dissolution of the Soviet Union and the restoration of sovereignty in 1991, the song was re-adopted as the national anthem, albeit with slightly modified lyrics.

== History ==
=== Composition ===
The lyrics of "Our Fatherland" were derived from "The Song of an Italian Girl" (Armenian: Իտալացի աղջկա երգը Italatsi aghjka yergė), a poem written by Mikael Nalbandian in 1859 and published in 1861. In the early 20th century, the music was composed by Parsegh Ganatchian. Subsequently, both the lyrics (with changes) and music were adopted as the national anthem of the First Republic of Armenia, which briefly existed from 1918 to 1920.

=== Soviet era ===
In November 1920, the Red Army invaded Armenia, in spite of the Treaty of Sèvres – which granted the country international recognition as a sovereign state – having been signed only three months earlier. In 1922, it was absorbed into the Transcaucasian Socialist Federative Soviet Republic (TSFSR), together with Azerbaijan and Georgia, and the TSFSR subsequently became part of the Soviet Union at the end of that same year. As a symbol of Armenian nationalism, the song "Our Fatherland" was outlawed by the Bolshevik authorities. In its place, the Anthem of the Armenian Soviet Socialist Republic was utilized from 1944 onwards. Because of this, "Our Fatherland" took on a new status as a protest song against Soviet rule during this time.

=== Restoration of sovereignty and beyond ===
Following the dissolution of the Soviet Union, the song "Our Fatherland" was reinstated as Armenia's national anthem on 1 July 1991 by the constituent republic's Supreme Soviet. The lyrics are not identical to the 1918 version, however, because several words have been modified. As an intrinsic element of civic education in Armenia, the anthem is one of several national symbols which are featured in classrooms of the country's schools. By dignifying the song in this manner, teachers reckon that this "encourage[s] students to sing the national anthem every day".

A debate of the national anthem was a question in the Armenian Parliament in 2006 and in 2019. The new government had called for the restoration of the Soviet era anthem with newer lyrics in its place.

The Italian violist Marco Misciagna composed the "Introduction and Variations on Mer Hayrenik” for viola solo, and in 2018, he played it during a concert at the Komitas Chamber Music House.

In 2025, changes were made to the law on the anthem: the order of the hymn's stanzas was changed: the second stanza became the third, the third became the fourth, and the fourth became the second.

== Lyrics ==
The lyrics of the national anthem promotes the worthiness of "dying for the freedom" of Armenia. Its discussion of death, however, has led several commentators to complain that the anthem is overly "wimpy" and "gloomy". Specifically, some members of the National Assembly are of the opinion that the song – written at the time of the first fight for independence – does not accurately reflect the present era of triumph and success. However, none of the proposals to replace "Our Fatherland" have come to fruition, as the Armenian Revolutionary Federation (Dashnaktsutyun) – which were part of the coalition government – have so far resisted efforts to change the national anthem, especially proposals to replace it with one based on the music of the anthem of the Armenian SSR.

=== Current version ===
Mer Hayrenik
National Anthem of Armenia with changed words

Armenian original

Armenian script

Մեր Հայրենիք, ազատ անկախ,
Որ ապրել է դարեդար
𝄆 Յուր (Note: Sometimes written as the modern form իր (ir) instead.) որդիքը արդ կանչում են
Ազատ, անկախ Հայաստան։ 𝄇

Ամենայն տեղ մահը մի է
Մարդ մի անգամ պիտ մեռնի,
𝄆 Բայց երանի՝ որ յուր ազգի
Ազատության կը զոհվի։ 𝄇

Ահա եղբայր քեզ մի դրոշ,
Որ իմ ձեռքով գործեցի
𝄆 Գիշերները ես քուն չեղա,
Արտասուքով լվացի։ 𝄇

Նայիր նրան՝ երեք գույնով,
Նվիրական մեր նշան
𝄆 Թող փողփողի թշնամու դեմ
Թող միշտ պանծա Հայաստան։ 𝄇

Latin script

Mer Hayrenik, azat ankakh,
Vor aprel e daredar
𝄆 Yur vordikə ard kanchum en
Azat, ankakh Hayastan. 𝄇

Amenayn tegh mahə mi e
Mard mi angam pit merrni,
𝄆 Bayts yerani, vor yur azgi
Azatutyan kə zohvi. 𝄇

Aha yeghbayr kez mi drosh,
Vor im dzerrkov gortzetsi
𝄆 Gishernerə yes kun chegha,
Artasukov lvatsi. 𝄇

Nayir nran yerek guynov,
Nvirakan mer nshan
𝄆 Togh poghpoghi təshnamu dem
Togh misht pantza Hayastan. 𝄇

IPA transcription (Note: See Help:IPA/Armenian and Armenian phonology.)

[mɛɾ hɑj.ɾɛ.ˈnikʰ | ɑ.ˈzɑt ɑŋ.ˈkɑχ |]
[voɾ ɑp.ˈɾɛl ɛ dɑ.ɾɛ.ˈdɑɾ ‖]
𝄆 [juɾ voɾ.ˈdi.kʰə ɑɾd kɑn.ˈt͡ʃʰum ɛn |]
[ɑ.ˈzɑt ɑŋ.ˈkɑχ hɑ.jɑs.ˈtɑn ‖] 𝄇

[ɑ.mɛ.ˈnɑjn tɛʁ | ˈmɑ.hə mi ɛ ‖]
[mɑɾd mi ɑŋ.ˈgɑm pit mɛr.ˈni |]
𝄆 [bɑjt͡sʰ jɛ.ɾɑ.ˈni | voɾ juɾ ɑz.ˈgi]
[ɑ.zɑ.tu.ˈtʰjɑn kə.zoɦ.ˈvi ‖] 𝄇

[ɑ.ˈhɑ jɛʁ.ˈbɑjɾ | kʰɛz mi də.ˈɾoʃ |]
[voɾ im d͡zɛr.ˈkʰov goɾ.t͡sɛ.ˈt͡sʰi ‖]
𝄆 [gi.ʃɛɾ.ˈnɛ.ɾə jɛs kʰun t͡ʃʰɛ.ˈʁɑ |]
[ɑɾ.tɑ.su.ˈkʰov lə.vɑ.ˈt͡sʰi ‖] 𝄇

[nɑ.ˈjiɾ nə.ˈɾɑn | jɛ.ˈɾɛkʰ guj.ˈnɔv |]
[nə.vi.ɾɑ.ˈkɑn mɛɾ nə.ˈʃɑn ‖]
𝄆 [tʰoʁ pʰoʁ.pʰo.ˈʁi tʰəʃ.nɑ.ˈmu dɛm |]
[tʰoʁ miʃt pɑn.ˈt͡sɑ hɑ.jɑs.ˈtɑn ‖] 𝄇

Literal translation

Our Fatherland, free, independent,
That has lived for centuries,
𝄆 Is now summoning its sons
To the free, independent Armenia. 𝄇

Death is the same everywhere,
A man dies but once,
𝄆 Blessed is the one who dies
For the freedom of his nation. 𝄇

Here is a flag for you my brother,
That I have sewed
𝄆 Over the sleepless nights,
And bathed in my tears. 𝄇

Look at it, tricoloured,
A valuable symbol for us.
𝄆 Let it shine against the enemy.
Let Armenia be glorious forever. 𝄇

=== Original version ===
The national anthem is based on the first, third, fourth and sixth stanzas of Nalbandian's poem "The Song of an Italian Girl". The original text uses Classical spelling, which preceded the Armenian orthography reform.

Armenian original

Armenian script

Մեր հայրենիք, թշուառ, անտէր,
Մեր թշնամուց ոտնակոխ,
Իւր որդիքը արդ կանչում է
Հանել իւր վրէժ, քէն ու ոխ:

Ահա՛, եղբայր, քեզ մի դրoշ,
Որ իմ ձեռքով գործեցի,
Գիշերները ես քուն չեղայ,
Արտասուքով լուացի։

Նայի՛ր նրան, երեք գոյնով,
Նուիրական մեր նշան,
Թո՛ղ փողփողի թշնամու դէմ,
Թող միշտ պանծա Հայաստան։

Ամենայն տեղ մահը մի է,
Մարդ մի անգամ պիտ մեռնի.
Բայց երանի՜, որ իւր ազգի
Ազատութեան կը զոհուի:

Latin script

Mer Hayrenik, təshvarr, anter,
Mer təshnamuts votnakokh,
Iur vordikə ard kanchum e
Hanel iur vrezh, ken u vokh.

Aha, yeghbayr, kez mi drosh,
Vor im dzerrkov gortzetsi,
Gishernerə yes kun chegha,
Artasukov lvatsi.

Nayir nran, yerek guynov,
Nvirakan mer nshan,
Togh poghpoghi təshnamu dem,
Togh misht pantza Hayastan.

Amenayn tegh mahə mi e,
Mard mi angam pit merrni.
Bayts yerani, vor iur azgi
Azatutyan kə zohvi.

Literal translation

Our homeland, miserable, abandoned,
Downtrodden by our foes,
Her sons now calleth,
Ready for revenge, spite and grudge.

Behold, brother, a flag for thee,
That I've sewn with my own hands,
During the sleepness nights,
Bathed in my tears.

Look at it, tricolored,
Our symbol cherished,
Let it shine against the foe,
Let you, Armenia, be glorious forever.

Death is the same everywhere,
Man who dieth but even once.
Blessed is the one who dieth
For the freedom of his land.

== In popular culture ==
The title of the national anthem is used as the name of a television channel for Armenian expatriates residing in Russia. Mer Hayrenik TV is based in the city of Novosibirsk, the administrative centre of both Novosibirsk Oblast and the Siberian Federal District.

== Musical adaptions ==
In 2012, Philip Sheppard with the London Philharmonic Orchestra recorded the Armenian anthem for the 2012 Summer Olympics and the 2012 Summer Paralympics.
