= Louise Nalbandian =

American historian (1926–1974)

Louise Ziazan Nalbandian (12 September 1926 – 2 December 1974) was an American Armenian historian and professor in the History Department at California State University, Fresno from 1964 to 1974. She was the author of The Armenian Revolutionary Movement: The Development of Armenian Political Parties Through the Nineteenth Century.

Nalbandian was born in San Francisco. She completed her doctorate at Stanford University and wrote her thesis on Armenian political parties.

Nalbandian died in a highway accident in 1974 in Stanislaus County, California.
