= Khojivank Pantheon of Tbilisi =

Armenian architectural complex

Armenian Pantheon of Tbilisi
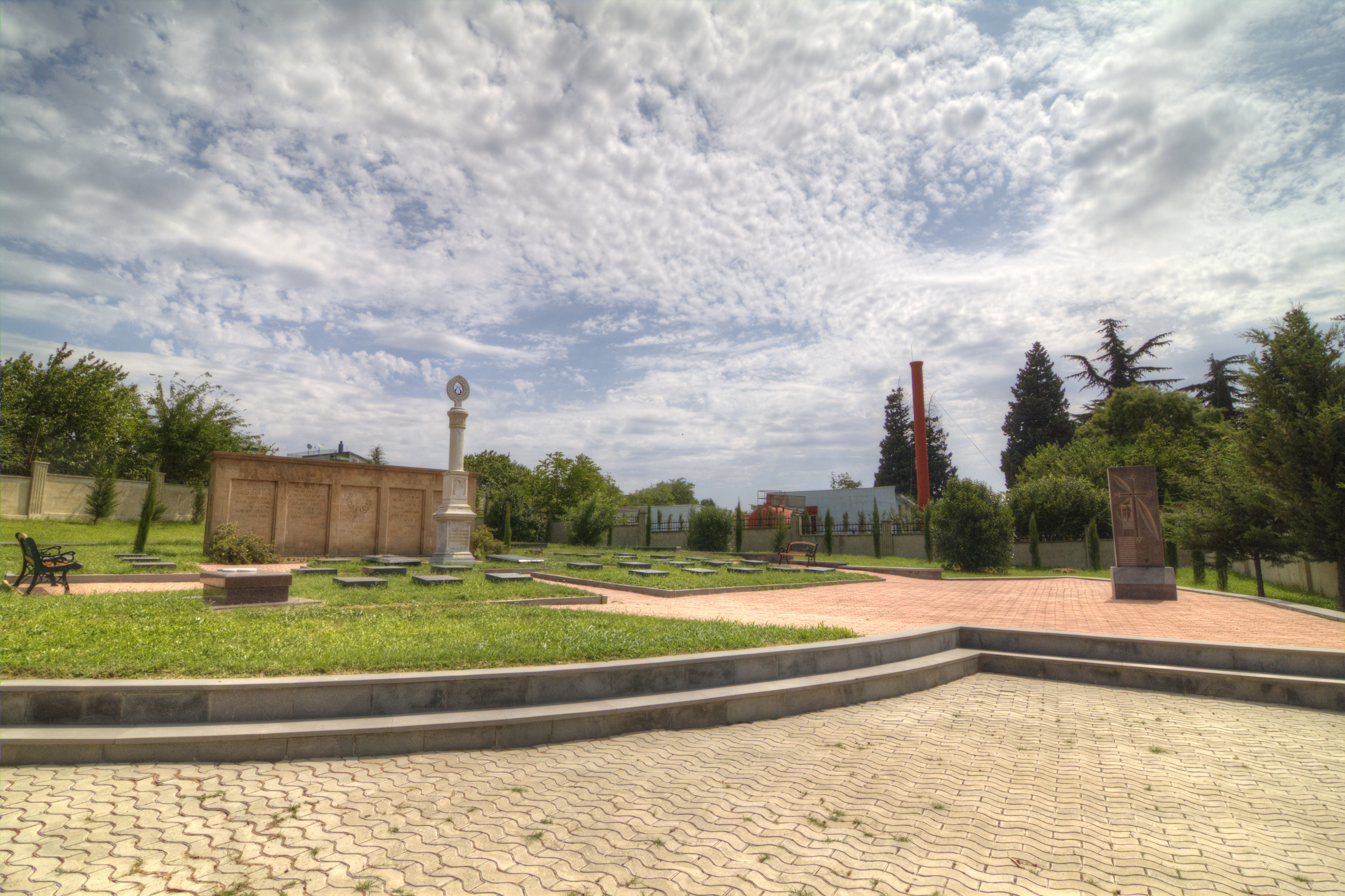
- The main cluster of tombstones remaining at Khojivank, 2011.
- Interactive map of Armenian Pantheon of Tbilisi

Details
- Established: c. 1655
- Location: Tbilisi, Georgia
- Coordinates: 41.698333°N 44.818611°E
- Type: public
- Owned by: Tbilisi Municipality

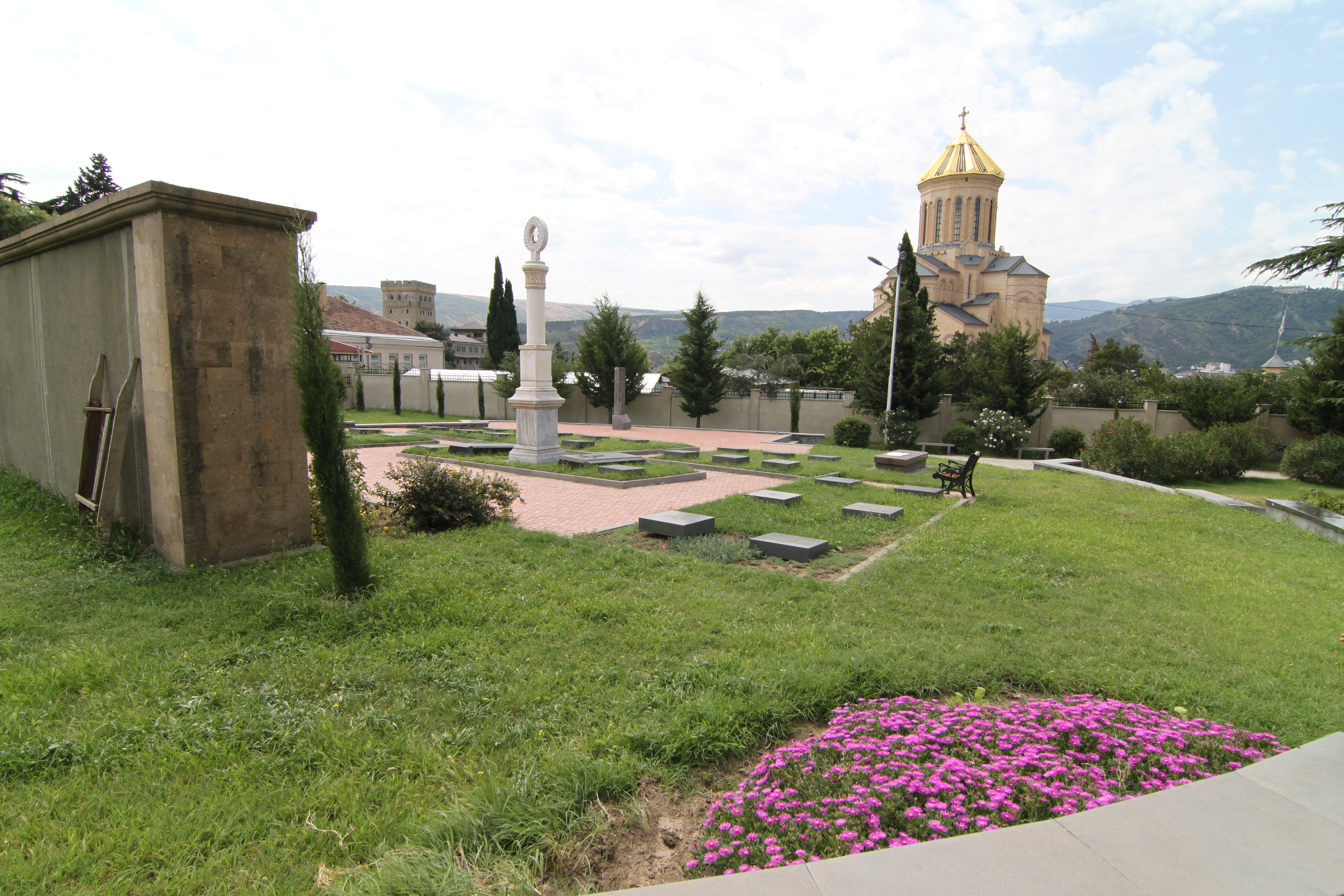
Sameba Cathedral (built on the former grounds of Khojivank) as seen from the Armenian Pantheon

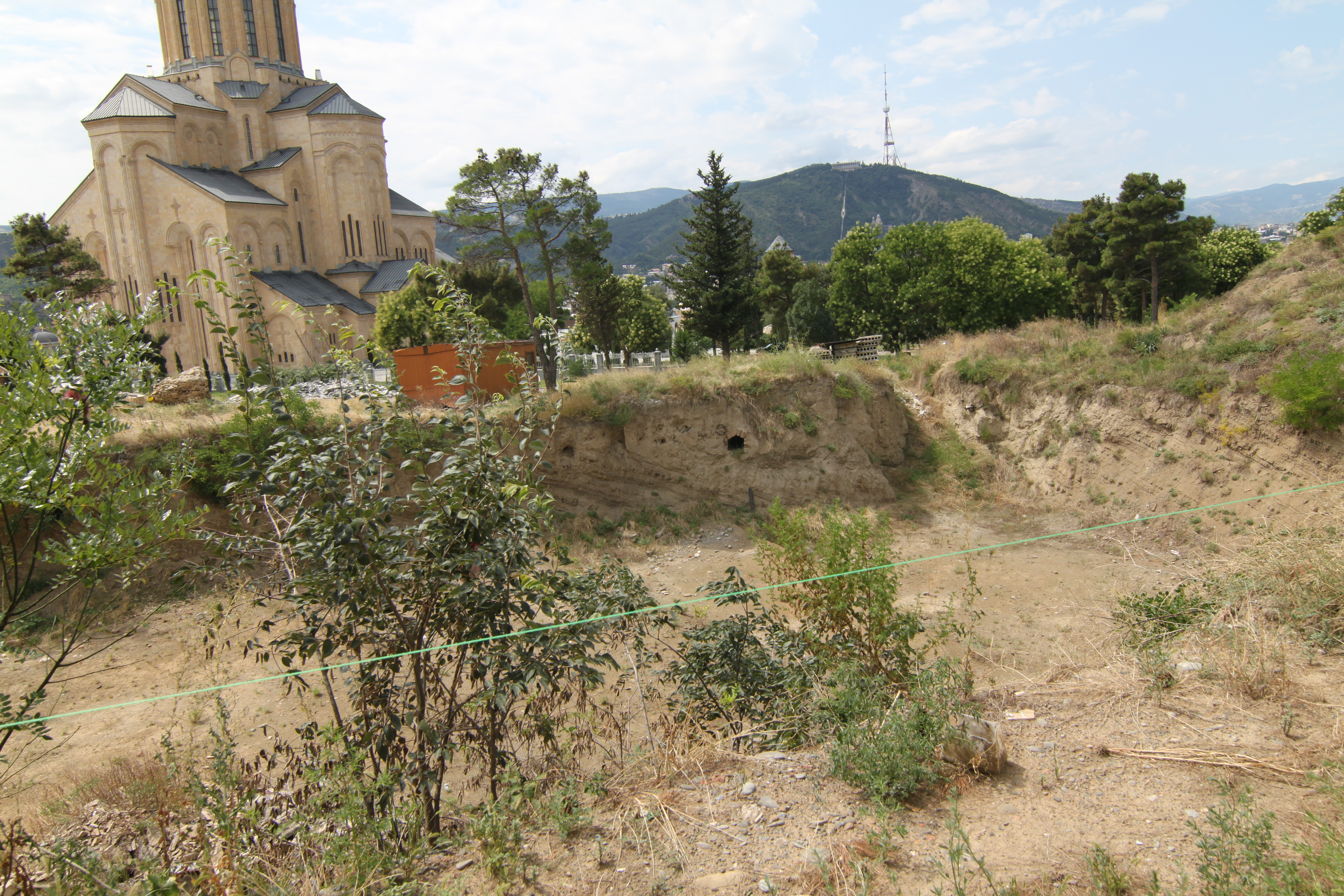
Exposed tombs in an excavated ditch

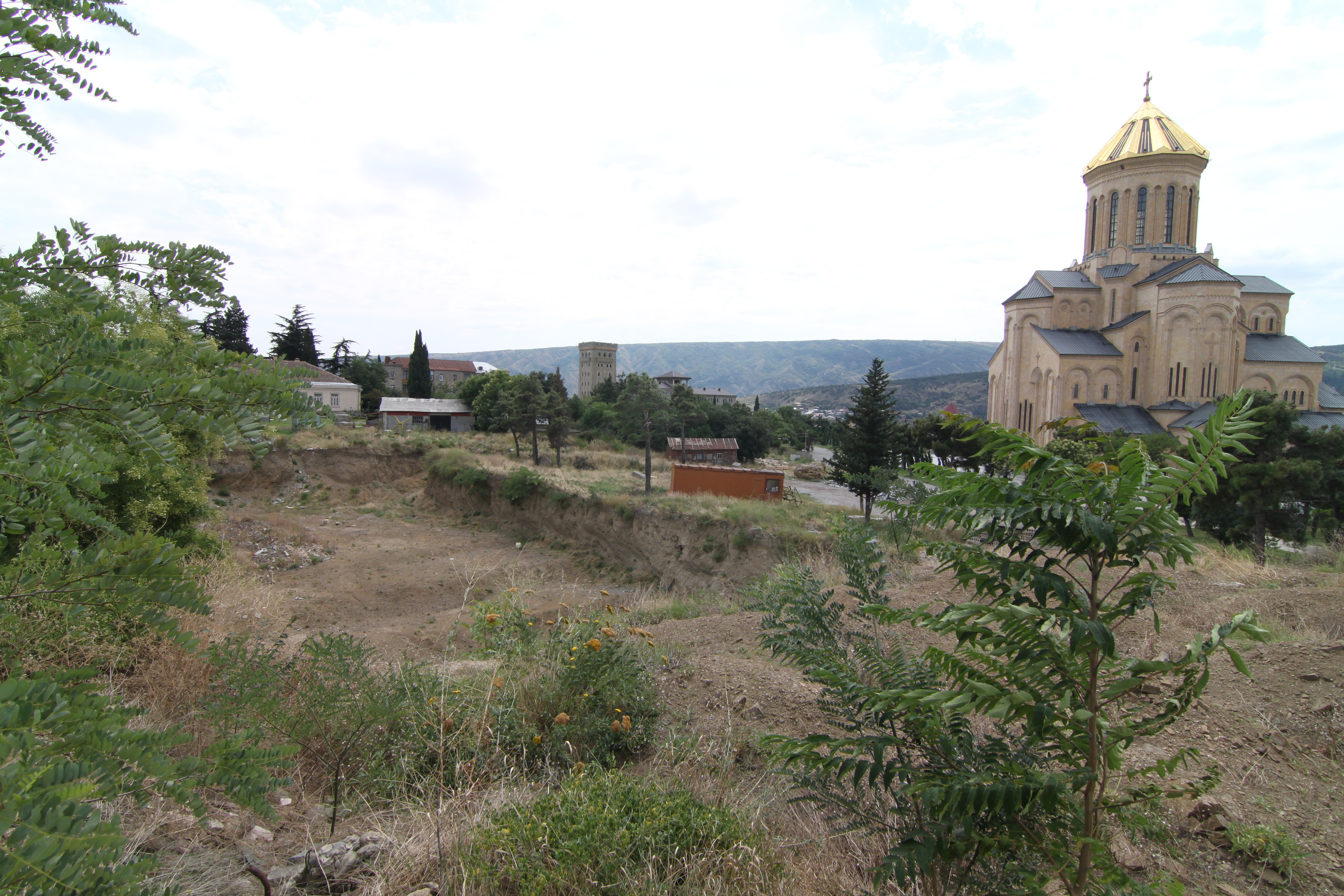
Excavation adjacent to the Pantheon exposing tombs of Khojivank

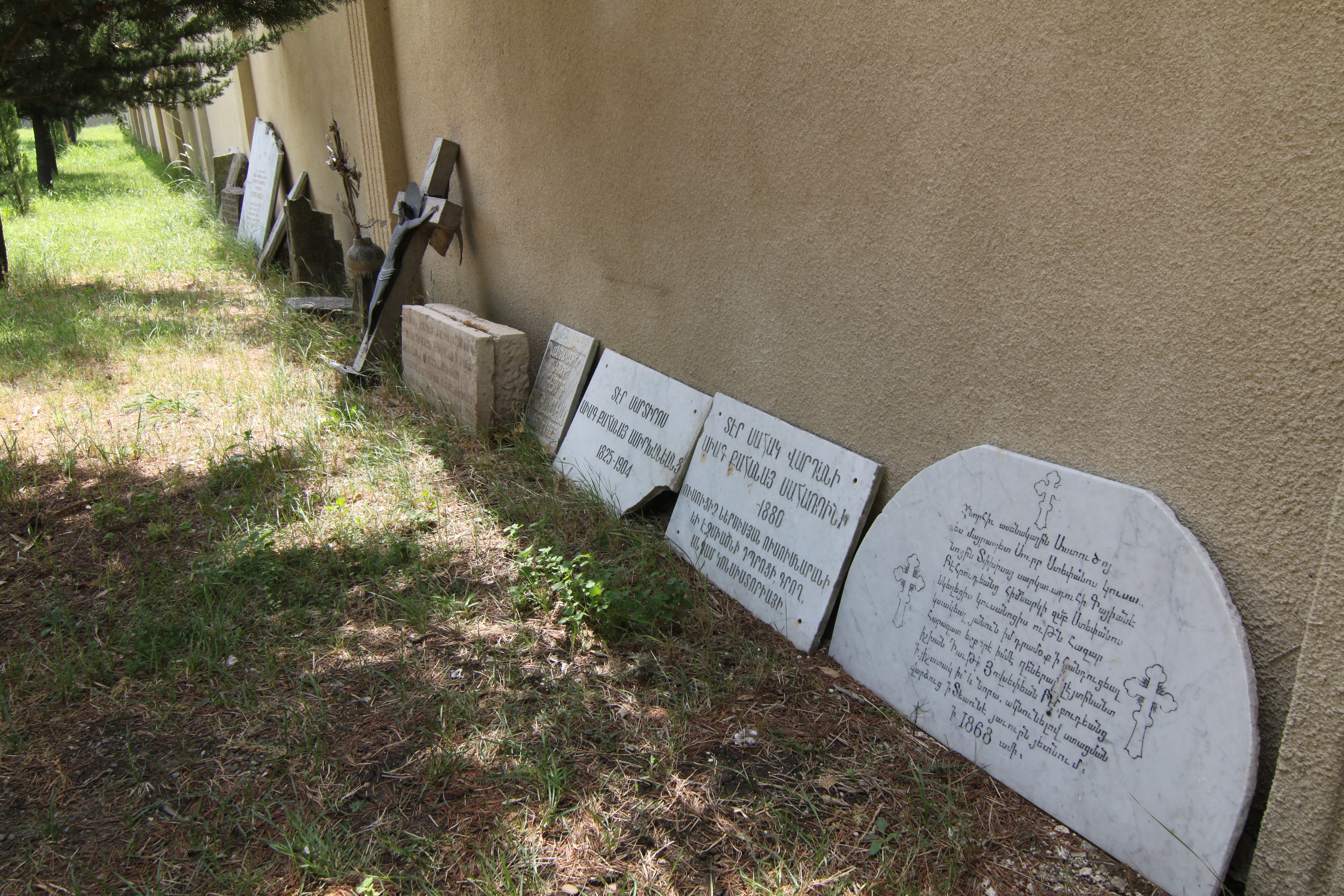
19th century epitaphs preserved in the Pantheon

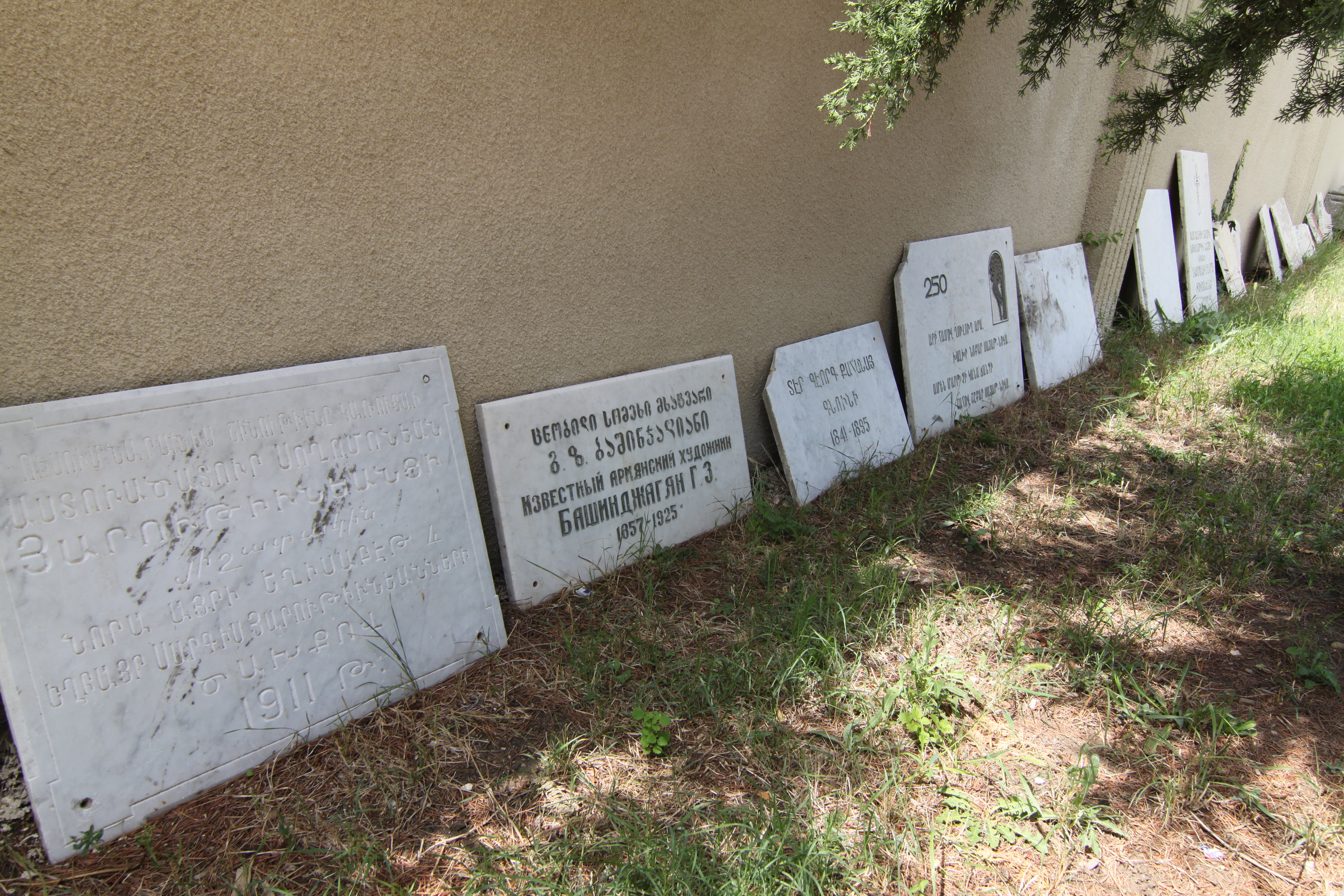
19th and 20th century epitaphs

The Armenian Pantheon of Tbilisi, also known as Khojivank (Georgian: ხოჯივანქი Khojivank'i; Armenian: Խոջիվանք) or Khojavank (Armenian: Խոջավանք), is an architectural complex in north-eastern part of the Avlabari district of Tbilisi, Georgia. It occupies part of the site of the destroyed cemetery of Khojavank and contains the relocated tombstones of some of the notable Armenian writers, artists and public figures that were buried there.

Khojavank formerly consisted of a huge memorial cemetery and the Holy Mother of God Armenian Church (St. Astvatsatsin church). The church and most part of the cemetery was destroyed in 1937, and most of the remaining part of the cemetery was destroyed between 1995 and 2004 during the construction of the Holy Trinity Cathedral of Tbilisi (also known as Sameba Cathedral). The tiny part that remains, together with some relocated gravestones, is preserved as the Armenian Pantheon of Tbilisi.

== Construction and rise ==
The area was given to Armenian Bebut-Bek of Bebutov family in 1612 by Shah Abbas by appropriate diploma. His son Aslan Meliq-Bebut, treasurer of Georgian king Rostom of Kartli enlarged the original cemetery, built pipes for bringing water here, planted a number of trees and in 1655 built St. Astvatsatin church, called Khojivank as a name of the founded, who was called by Georgian king Rostom – Khoja Bebut (Big Bebut). Later the cemetery was called Khojivank too. The building sign preserved and is kept in Historical-Ethnographic Museum of Tbilisi, which says: "In summer of Armenian year of 1104 with the wish of God I, Khoja Bebut and my brother Khatin and my wife Lali built this church of humble Aslan". St. Astvatsatsin church was dedicated to Saint Purple Mother of God, was circled in fence, had beautiful walls and had a blossoming garden beside. Later the diploma of Bebutovs was renewed by Teimuraz II and Heraclius II.

In 1899 a massive boundary wall was built around the cemetery, which by that time had enlarged immensely to become the largest Armenian cemetery in Tbilisi. The number of graves in the period before its destruction reached more than 90,000.

== Destruction of the cemetery ==
By the 1920s burials in Khojivank had almost ceased.

In 1934, on Lavrentiy Beria's order, the church and cemetery started to be destroyed. The St. Astvatsatin church with surrounding church buildings were destroyed, all the chapels and crypts were crushed together with most of graves, whose gravestones and khachkars of rare marble and other stones were reused as building materials in other structures. The Marxism–Leninism Institute building used a great deal of marble from the destruction of Khojivank, as did the Baratashvili ascent, the walkway in front of the Pioneer's Palace, the Institute of the Party halls (the current Georgian parliament) and Lavrentiy Beria's house at 11 Machabeli. The wall bordering School #68 and a water tower built in 1961 was also built of those gravestones. Some stones were used in a stairway in a park on Madaten island, and many other buildings. Special brigades of the People's Commissariat for State Security were seeking for precious items around the cemetery. This continued until 1938, by which time most of the cemetery had been destroyed, and a little part of the graves were saved and generally were moved to Petropavlovskoe cemetery. The gravestones of Hovhannes Tumanyan and Raffi were saved. The area was rebuilt as a park with the preliminary name "26 Commissars Park of Culture and Leisure", but its final name was "Friendship Park", where the walls were built mainly of Armenian gravestones.

On 17 March 1962 the Armenian Pantheon was opened containing about 30 saved gravestones – most of which did not have any human remains beneath them.

In 1994 construction of Holy Trinity Cathedral started inside the park area. At first it was announced to occupy area beside Khojivank, but the size of the new church was huge and it covered a significant part of Khojivank, including the site of the St. Astvatsatsin Armenian Church. During foundation work for the church, bulldozers and excavators dug up the remains of thousands of those who had been interred in the cemetery, and around the future church mounds of skulls and bones were formed. These human remains, mixed with broken tombstones and other debris, were later taken away in trucks to an unknown destination. Most of the remaining graves were removed, most gravestones were removed. Grigoriy Dolukhanov's gravestone was thrown in front of the Armenian theater and left for several years. As a response to Armenian protests the construction temporarily stopped. In June 1997 construction started again.

On 25 December 2002 the first church service was held. On November 23, 2004, the Holy Trinity Cathedral of Tbilisi was officially opened.

In May 2023, rebuilding work at Tbilisi's Mtatsminda district school number 44 revealed that its entrance stairway had been constructed using Armenian gravestones, stones probably taken from the Khojivank cemetery.

== Epigrams ==
The graves in the cemetery had a great number of epigrams and gravestones with short notes, which revealed much about the Armenian population of Tbilisi, families, various heritages and different sides of social life. Among the more famous epigrams were Sayat-Nova's wife's gravestone epigram, which said "456 (1768 y.). In this grave I am – wife of Sayat-Nova Marmar. Bless". Another example was epigram: "Here I am – wife of Ter-David, Archpriest of Mughni church. Who reads remember. Summer 420 (1732y.)". Grigor Artsruni's gravestone, created like a cliff, is lost. Ghazaros Aghayan gravestone with the epigram: "Friend of children Ghazaros Aghayan" is lost too. Some epigrams are preserved thanks to A. Yeremyan, who rewrote and published in Vienna the epigraphs of Khojivank of 19th century end – 20th century start, and some single examples are preserved in the Historical-Ethnographic museum in Tbilisi. Yeremyan wrote, "there were thousands of granite, marble sculptures and stelea, thousands of short and exciting notes, sad poems and quatrains".

== Burials ==
Here are some of the famous Armenians burials:

Name	Date	Occupation
Ghazaros Aghayan	1840–1911	Writer, educator, folklorist, historian, linguist and public figure
Hakob Aghabab	1926	Poet
Isahak Alikhanian	1946	Actor
Grigor Artsruni	1845–1892	"Mshak" newspaper editor
Bagrat Ayvazian	1937	Writer
Ashkharhabek Bebutov		Founder of Khojivank
Vasili Bebutov	1791–1858	General
Nikol Duman	1867–1914	Military leader and member of the Armenian Revolutionary Federation party
Keri	1858–1916	Military commander
Gevorg Hakhverdian	1892	Philologist, doctor, public figure, Sayat-Nova publisher
Hakob Hakobian (poet)	1866–1937	Poet
Naghash Hovnatan	1722	Great fresco artist of his time
Mkrtun Hovnatanyan	1846	
Jivani	1846–1909	Gusan (composer, singer)
Gayane Khachaturian	1942–2009	Painter
Vano Khojabekian	1875–1922	Graphic artist
Alexander Mantashev	1842–1911	Oil magnate, 1st Guild merchant and Speaker of the Tiflis Duma
Olga Maysuryan	1861–1931	Actress
Muratsan	1854–1908	Writer
Nar-Dos	1867–1933	Writer
Stepanos Nersisyan	1807–1884	Painter
Isay Pitoev	1904	Educator and philanthropist
Pertch Proshian	1837–1909	Writer and teacher
Raffi	1835–1888	Novelist and writer
Sos Sosyan	1928–2008	Actor
Gabriel Sundukyan	1825–1912	Writer and playwright, the founder of modern Armenian drama
Nikita Shahnazarian		General-Lieutenant in the Russo-Turkish War (1877–78)
Tserents (Hovsep Shishmanyan)	1822–1888	Writer
Aleksandr Tsaturyan	1865–1917	Poet and translator
Prince Georgi Tumanov	1854–1920	Founder of Georgian theater community and Tiflis College
Prince Mikhail Tumanov	1818–1875	Famous Georgian poet, first Pushkin translator to Georgian
Hovhannes Tumanyan	1869–1923	Poet and writer
Makar Yekmalian	1856–1905	Composer, conductor
Aleksandr Yeritsian	1841–1902	Historian and archeologist
Gevorg Yevangulian	1901	City mayor
Simon Zavarian	1866–1913	One of the founders of the Armenian Revolutionary Federation party
Sargis Darchinian	1947–2013	Archivist, Art-photographer, Author of book («Թիֆլիս. Հայկական ճեպանկարներ» – «Tiflis. Armenian Etudes/Sketches») and articles about Armenians and Houses/Buildings/Edifices (Armenians built, owned or dwelt in) in old Tiflis

Among famous Armenian families buried in Khojivank were

- Bebutov family
- Karaganov family
- Sarajev family
- Kalantarov family
- Kuzanov family
- Amirov family
- Sharoev family
- Agajanov family
- Ter-Davidov family
- Beriev family
- Muradov family
- Ter-Ghevondyan family
- Amiragov family
- Pitoev family
- Tarkhanov family
- Tumanov family
- Argutinsky-Dolgoroukov family (destroyed)

== Gallery ==
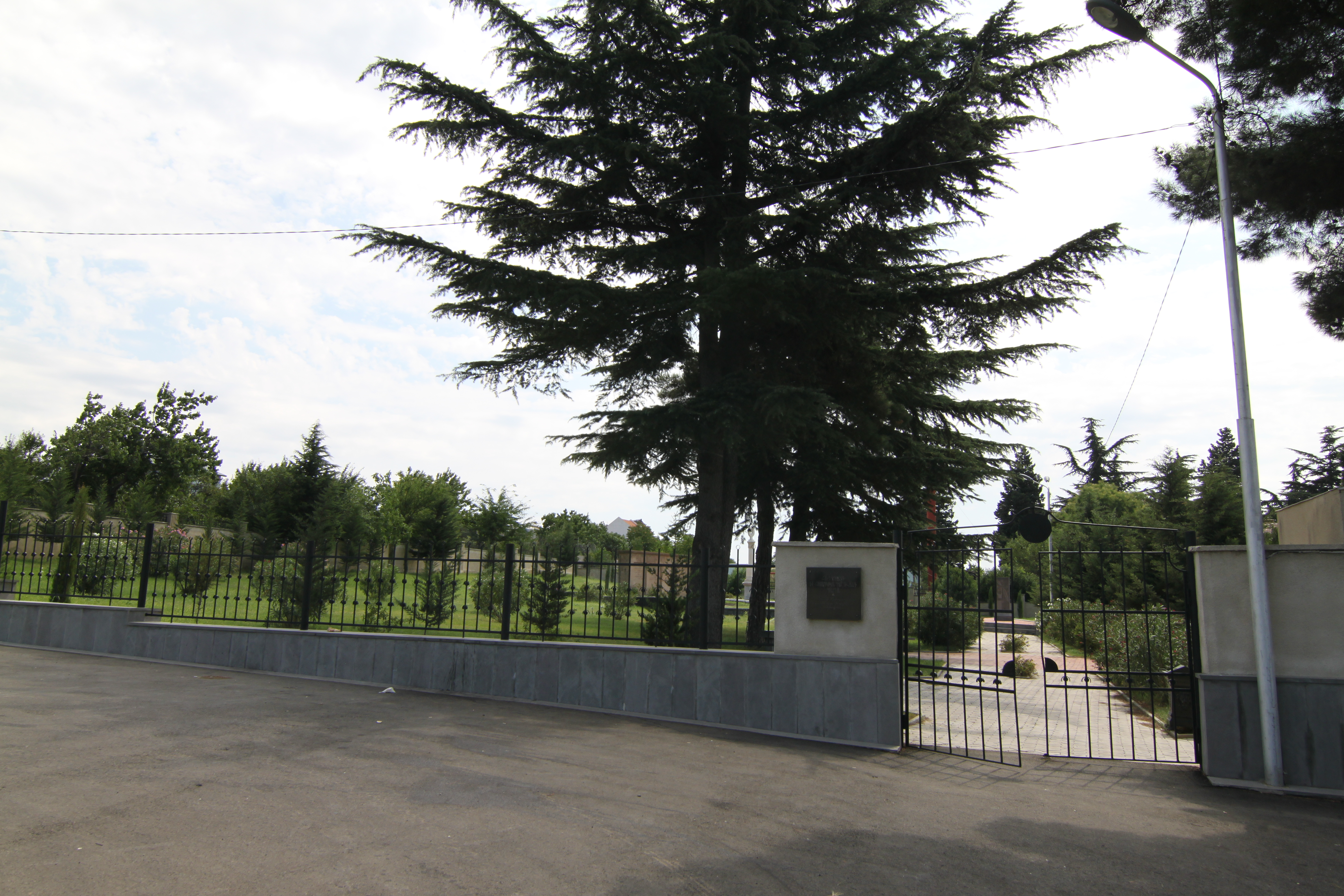
Entrance to the Pantheon

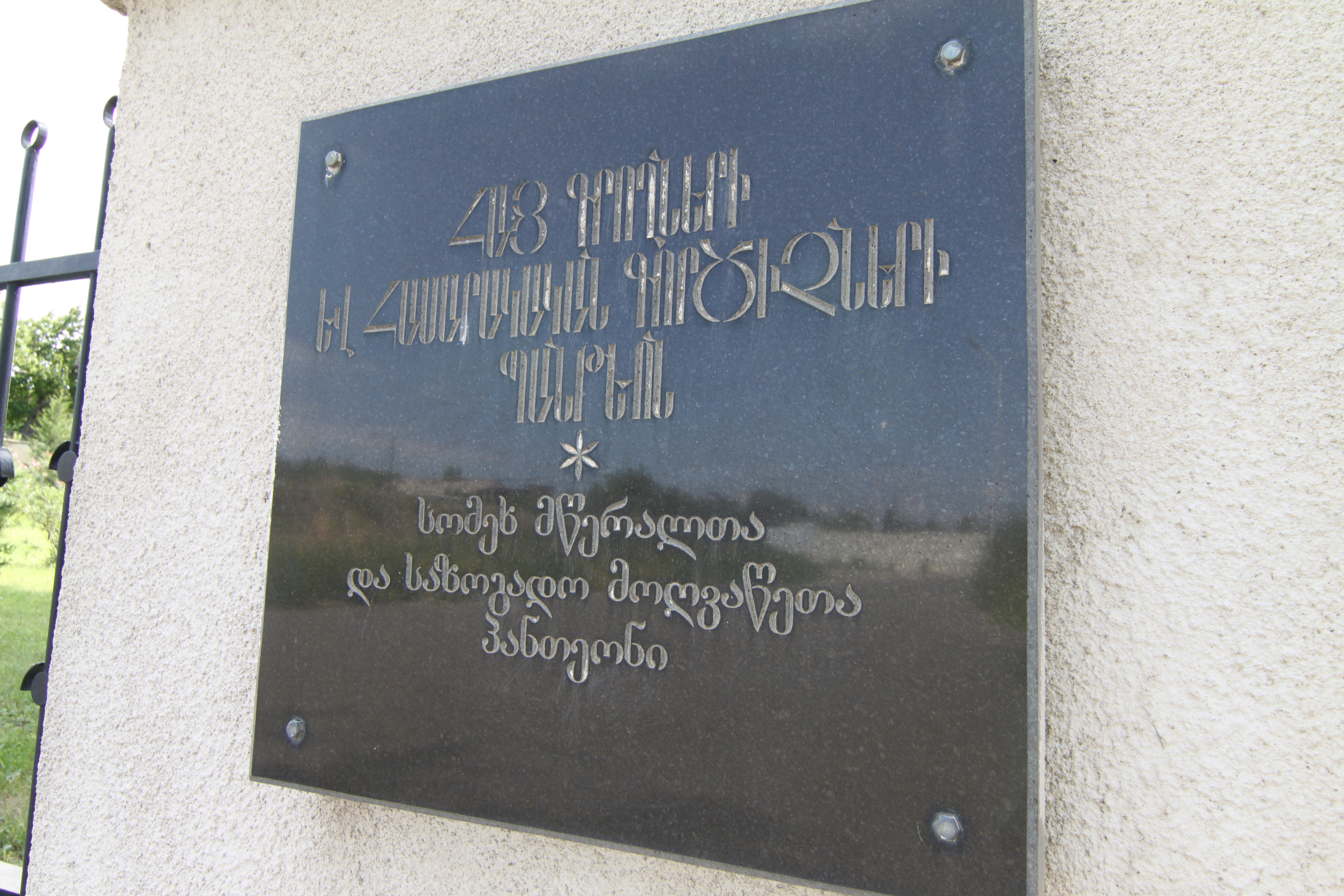
Plaque at entrance

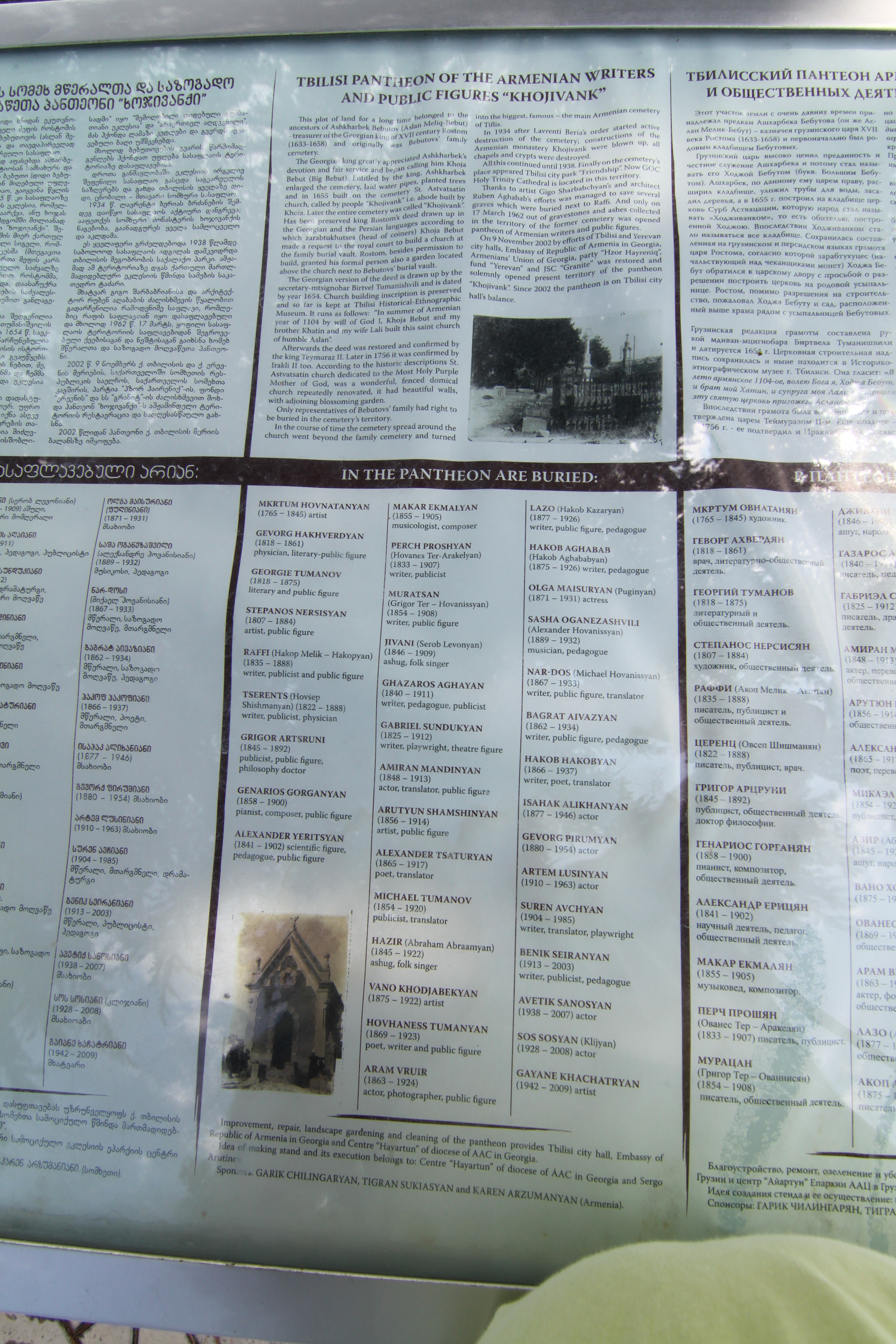
Descriptive plaque inside the Pantheon (in English)

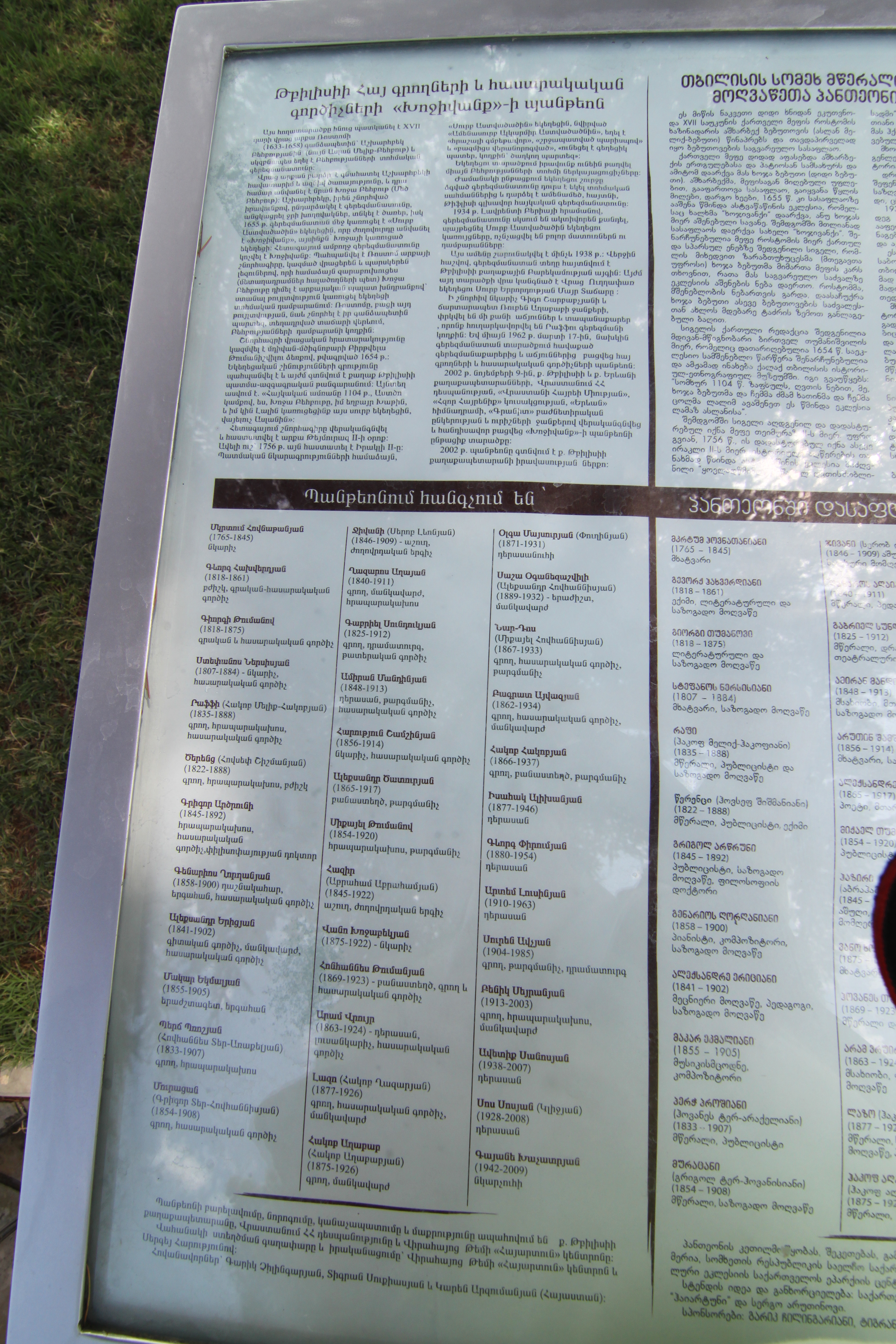
Descriptive plaque in Armenian

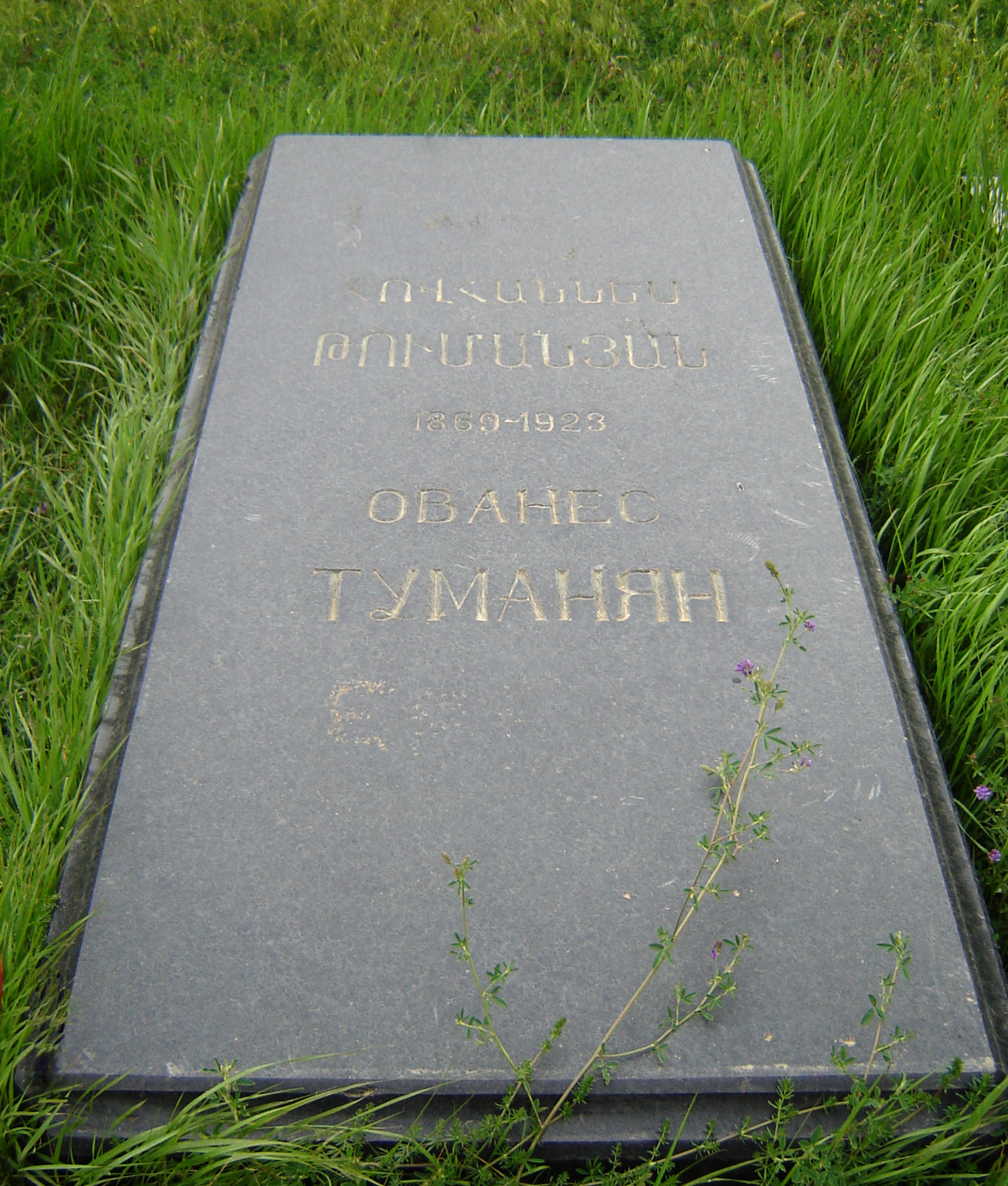
Tombstone of Hovhannes Tumanyan

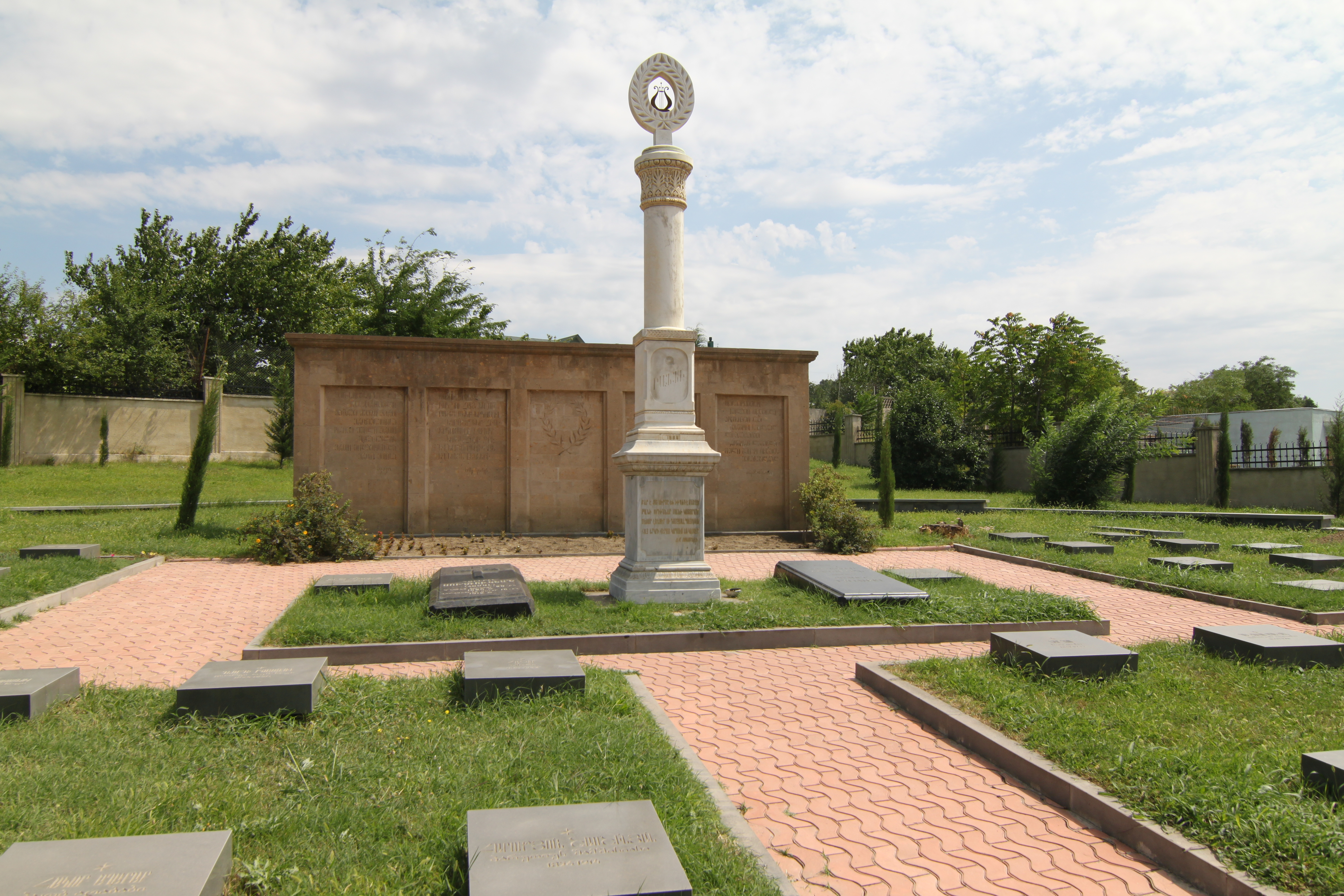
Monument to Raffi

== See also ==
- Komitas Pantheon, similar cemetery in Yerevan, Armenia for burials of great Armenians
- Armenians in Georgia
- Armenians in Tbilisi
- Holy Trinity Cathedral of Tbilisi
- List of cemeteries in Georgia (country)
