= Armenians in Tbilisi =

Total population
- 55,000

Regions with significant populations
- Tbilisi

Languages
- Armenian

Religion
- Armenian Apostolic Church

Related ethnic groups
- Armenians in Georgia

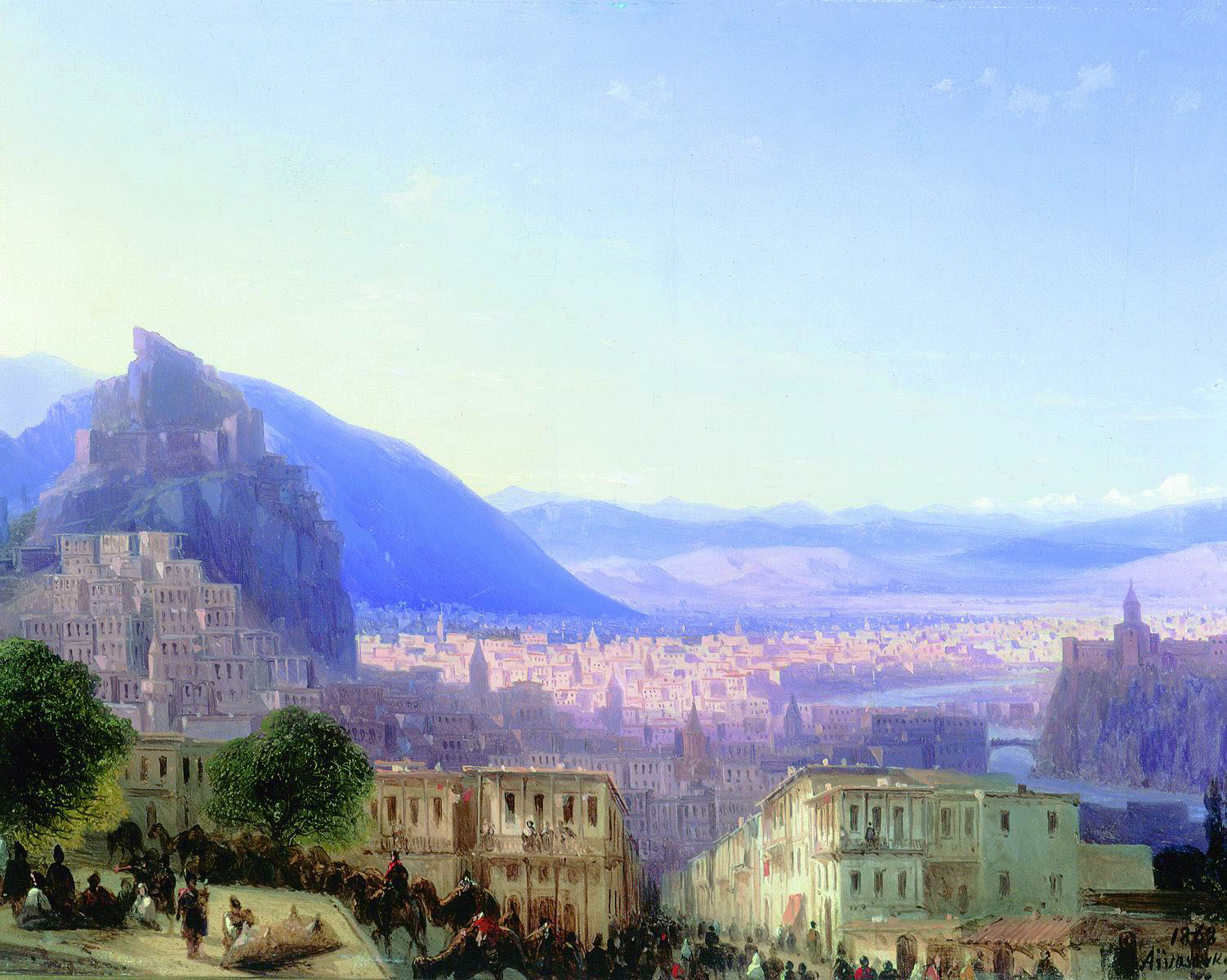
View of Tiflis by a prominent Russian-Armenian artist Ivan Aivazovsky, 1868

Armenians in Tbilisi by years
Year	TOTAL	Armenians	%
1801-3	20,000	14,860	74.3%
1864/65 winter	60,085	28,404	47.3%
1864/65 summer	71,051	31,180	43.9%
1876	104,024	37,610	36.1%
1897	159,590	41,151	36.4%
1916	346,766	149,294	43%
1926	294,044	100,148	34.1%
1939	519,220	137,331	26.4%
1959	694,664	149,258	21.5%
1970	889,020	150,205	16.9%
1979	1,052,734	152,767	14.5%
2002	1,081,679	82,586	7.6%
2014	1,108,717	53,409	4.8%

The Armenians have historically been one of the main ethnic groups in the city of Tbilisi, the capital of Georgia. Currently, they are the largest ethnic minority in Tbilisi at 4.8% of the population. Armenians migrated to the Georgian lands in the Middle Ages, during the Muslim rule of Armenia. They formed the single largest group of city's population in the 19th century. Official Georgian statistics of 2014 put the number of Armenians in Tbilisi at 53,409 people.

Tbilisi or Tiflis (as most Armenians call it) was the center of cultural life of Armenians in the Russian Empire from early 19th century to early 20th century.

== History ==
The Armenian history and contribution to the capital city of Tbilisi (known as Tiflis in Armenian, Russian, Persian, Azerbaijani and Turkish) is significant. After the Russian conquest of the area, Armenians fleeing persecution in the Ottoman Empire and Persia caused a jump in the Armenian population until it reached about 40% of the city total. Many of the mayors and business class were Armenian, and much of the old city was built by Armenians. Until recently the neighborhood of Avlabari and the area across the river were very heavily Armenian, but that has changed a great deal in the last two decades.

An Armenian community has been known to have existed in Tbilisi since at least the 7th century, however a large Armenian community was not formed until the Late Middle Ages. By the late Middle Ages, there were some 24 Armenian churches and monasteries in and around the city. According to Tournefort, Armenians constituted three-quarters of the population of Tiflis in the 18th century, and owned 24 churches.

Under the Russian Empire, the city of Tiflis became the center of Russian rule for the whole viceroyalty of Caucasia. During the 19th century, Tiflis became the center of the Eastern Armenian cultural revival and an Armenian cultural hub second only to Constantinople.

The older Armenian neighborhood of Tbilisi, on both sides of the river between Freedom Square and Avlabari carry Armenian names, including Tumanyan, Abovian, Akopian, Alikhanian, Sundukian, Yerevan, Ararat and Sevan.

The Diocese Church (the Saint Gevorg Church) in Tbilisi where the Armenian primate of Tbilisi sits is very close to the city fortress. In front of the church is the tomb of the 18th-century Armenian–Georgian bard, Sayat-Nova. In Avlabari, the other Armenian Church of Echmiadzin is undergoing renovation and reconstruction. The Armenian Pantheon of Tbilisi has the tombs of many famous Armenians including writers Hovhannes Tumanyan and Raffi.

== Armenian sites ==
=== Churches ===
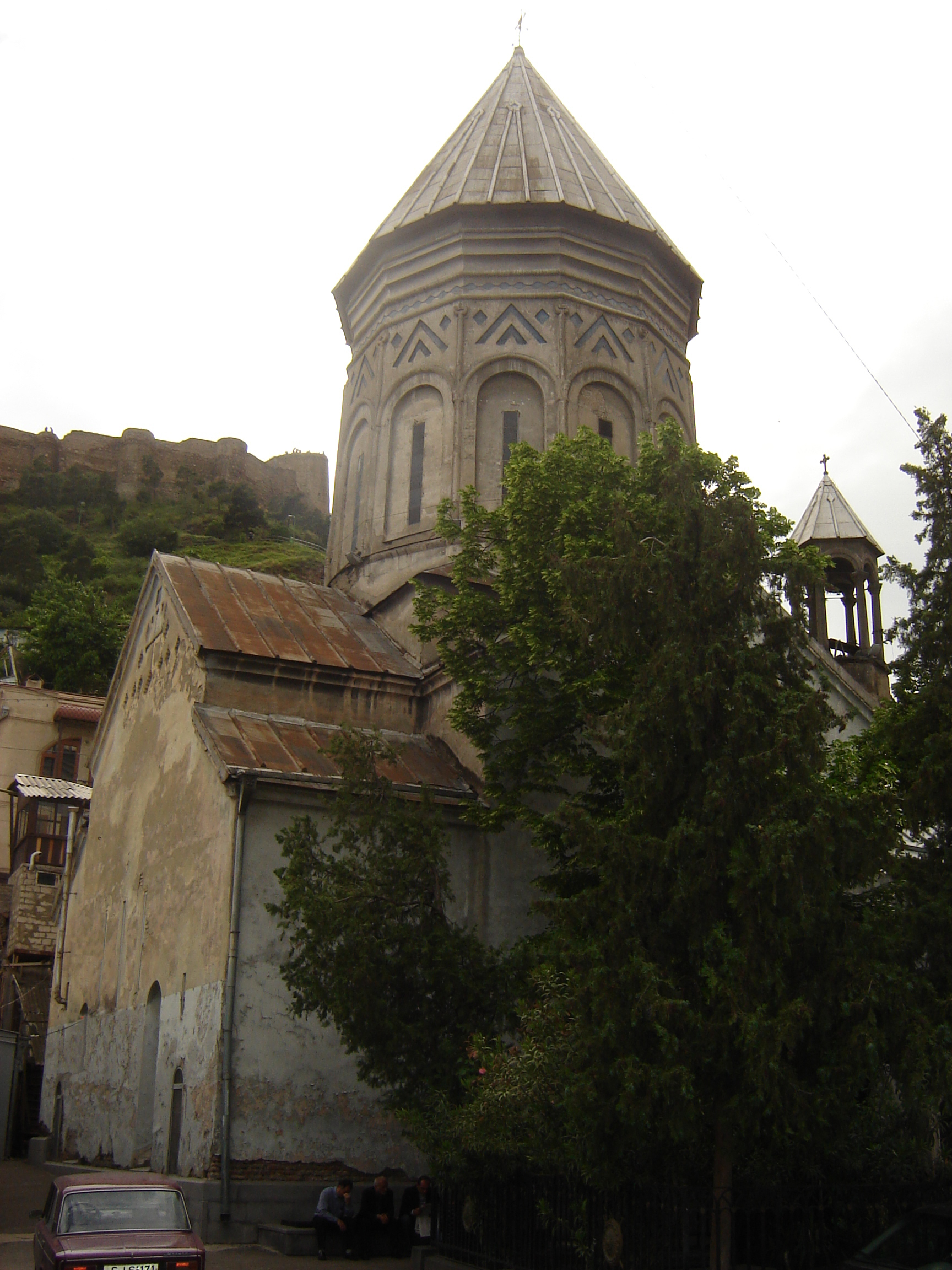
The Cathedral of Saint George

According to Tournefort, Armenians constituted three-quarters of the population of Tiflis in the 18th century, and owned 24 churches. Ten of the churches were destroyed in the 1930s, and as of 1979, fourteen were still standing.

There are still two working Armenian Churches in the city, and an Armenian Theatre. The Armenian Pantheon, where prominent Armenians are buried has the tombs of some of Armenian's favorite personalities ever, including Raffi and Hovhannes Tumanyan. The adjacent Armenian cemetery was taken over by the Georgian Church and their new national cathedral was built upon it. The remaining space in between the Pantheon and the new Georgian cathedral is now the construction site of what appears to be a Georgian Seminary. Again, the Armenian tombs here are being ignored, and human bones are being moved around like dirt.

A number of Armenian churches were confiscated by the Soviet state and then passed to the Georgian Church in the post-Soviet era. According to the United States State Department: "The Roman Catholic and Armenian Apostolic Churches have been unable to secure the return of churches and other facilities closed during the Soviet period, many of which later were given to the Georgian Orthodox Church by the State. The prominent Armenian church in Tbilisi, Norashen, remained closed, as did four other smaller Armenian churches in Tbilisi and one in Akhaltsikhe. In addition, the Roman Catholic and Armenian Apostolic Churches, as with Protestant denominations, have had difficulty obtaining permission to construct new churches due to pressure from the GOC."

=== Petros Adamian Tbilisi State Armenian Drama Theatre ===
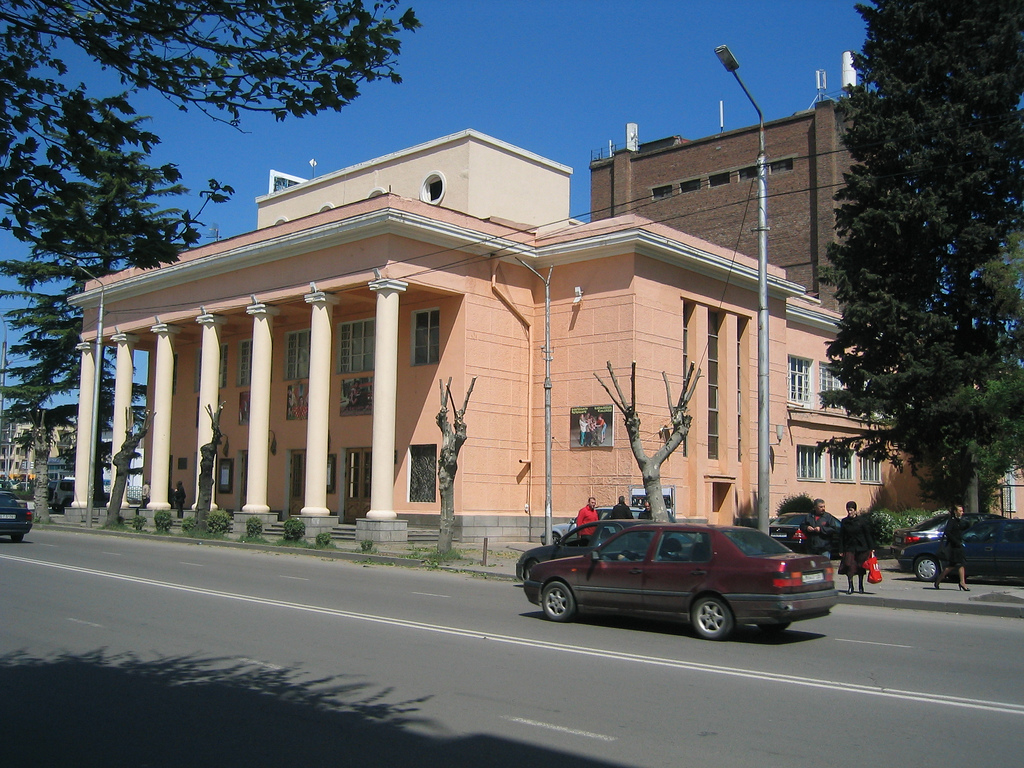
Pedros Adamian Armenian Theatre

Petros Adamian Tbilisi State Armenian Drama Theatre was established in 1858 by the Armenian theatre figure George Chmshkian. The first staging was "Adji Suleyman" performance. From 1922 through 1936 before building of the new current theatre building the theatres name was "Artistic theatre". In 1936 was built a new theatre building which was named Stepan Shahumian Armenian Theatre, after Bolshevik Stepan Shahumian. The first performance was Mkrtich (Nikita) Djanan's performance "Shahname". Here worked Petros Adamian, Siranoush (Merobe Kantarjian), Vahram Papazian, Hovhannes Abelian, Olga Maysourian, Isaac Alikhanian, Mariam Mojorian, Artem and Maria Beroians, Artem Lusinian, Babken Nersesian, Darius Amirbekian, Ashot Kadjvorian, Emma Stepanian, Armenian directors: Arshak Bourdjalian, Leon Kalantar, Stepan Kapanakian, Alexander Abarian, Ferdinand Bzhikian, Hayk Umikian, Mickael Grigorian, Ivan Karapetian, Roman Chaltikian, Roman Matiashvili, Robert Yegian. Music for theatres often was written by Aram Khachaturian, Armen Tigranian, Alexander Spendiarian, and others.

Nowadays Peter Adamian Tbilisi State Armenian Drama Theatre is the main spiritual and public center of Georgian-Armenian community.

=== Freedom Square ===
Once formally known as Paskevich Yerevanski Square, then Lenin Square, it was commonly called Yerevan Square. Ivan Paskevich was a Russian general and was called Paskevich of Yerevan (Yerevanski) in honor of his taking of Yerevan for the Russian Empire. Abutting the north side of Freedom Square is a small open space with a fountain. Buried between the bust of Pushkin and the fountain is the Bolshevik revolutionary Kamo (Simon Ter-Petrossian). His grave has been paved over and is unmarked.

=== Armenian Street Names ===
The heavily Armenian old neighborhoods of Tbilisi still have many Armenian street names, though some have been changed over time. Leselidze Street was once called Armenian Bazaar Street.

=== Vera cemetery ===
Vera cemetery was used by local Armenians before the Soviet takeover. Now it is used by Georgians.

== Notable Armenians from Tbilisi ==
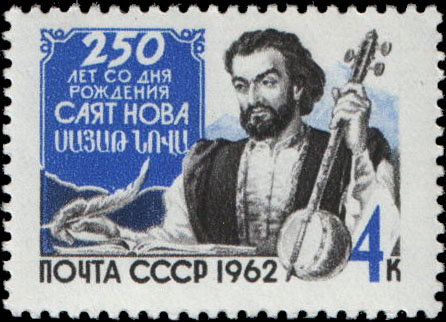
Sayat Nova

=== Pre-Revolution ===
- Sayat-Nova (1712–1795), poet, musician and ashik who had compositions in a number of languages
- Vasili Bebutov (1791–1858), Russian-Armenian general, a descendant of a Georgian-Armenian noble house of Bebutashvili/Bebutov
- Stepanos Nazarian (1812–1879), publisher, enlightener, historian of literature and orientalist
- Gabriel Sundukian (1825–1912), outstanding playwright, the founder of modern Armenian drama
- Mikhail Loris-Melikov (1826–1888), Russian-Armenian statesman, General of the Cavalry, and Adjutant General of H. I. M. Retinue
- Nar-Dos (1867–1933), writer
- Mariam Vardanian (1864–1941), political activist and revolutionary in the Russian Empire. She was one of the founders of the Social Democrat Hunchakian Party
- Hovhannes Tumanyan (1869–1923), the greatest Armenian poet and writer
- Nikol Aghbalian (1875–1947), public figure and historian of literature, 1919–1920 he was the Minister of Education and Culture of the First Republic of Armenia
- Alexander Khatisyan (1874–1945), politician and a journalist, mayor of Tbilisi (1910–1917) and Prime Minister of the First Republic of Armenia (1919–1920)
- Christophor Araratov (1876–1937), major-general
- Sophie Areshian (1881–1971), revolutionary and fedayi

=== Soviet era ===
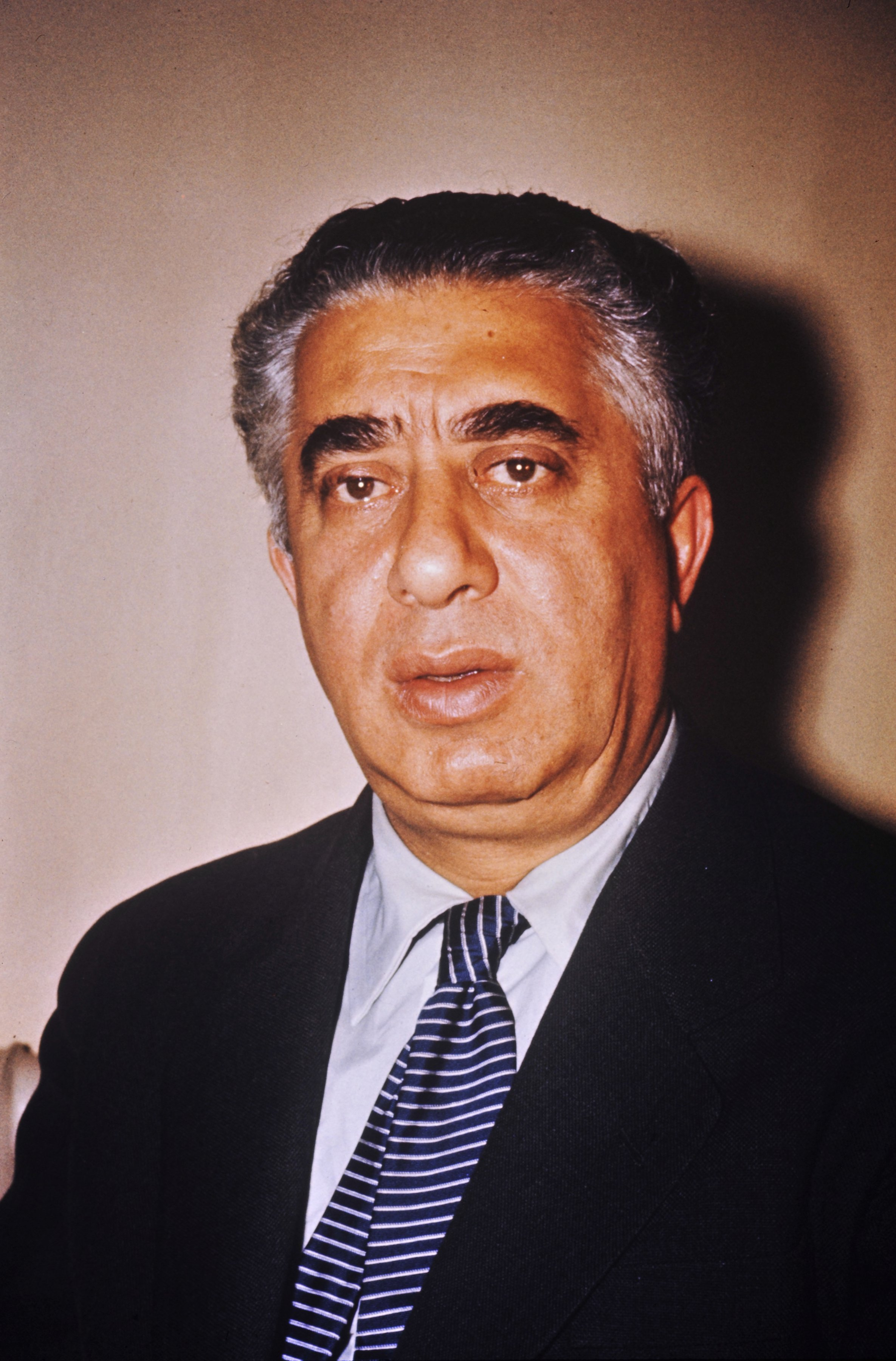
Aram Khachaturian

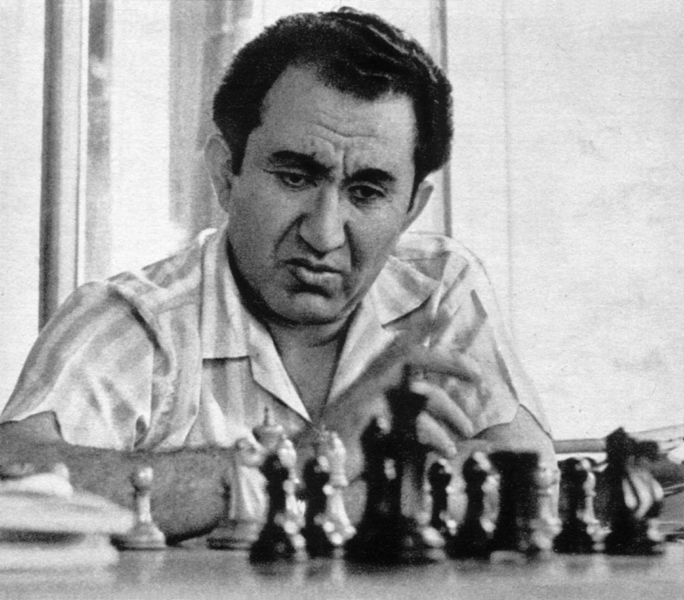
Tigran Petrosian

- Stepan Shahumyan (1878–1918), Bolshevik politician and revolutionary active throughout the Caucasus
- Tovmas Nazarbekian (1885–1931), general
- Sargis Barkhudaryan (1887–1973), Armenian composer, pianist and educator
- Rouben Mamoulian (1897–1987), Armenian-American film and theatre director.
- Gevorg Grigoryan (Giotto) (1897-1976), Armenian painter
- Yervand Kochar (1899–1979), prominent Armenian sculptor and artist
- Aram Khachaturian (1903–1978), prominent Soviet Armenian composer
- Alexander Melik-Pashayev (1905–1964), conductor
- Dmitriy Nalbandyan (1906–1993), painter
- Suren Yeremyan (1908–1992), historian and cartographer
- Rafayel Israyelian (1908–1973), Armenian architect and designer
- Artem Alikhanian (1908–1975), Soviet Armenian physicist, one of the founders and first director of the Yerevan Physics Institute
- Viktor Hambardzumyan (1908–1996), famous Soviet Armenian scientist, and one of the founders of theoretical astrophysics
- Edward Keonjian (1909–1999), prominent engineer, an early leader in the field of low-power electronics, the father of microelectronics
- Genrikh Kasparyan (1910–1995), considered to have been one of the greatest composers of chess endgame studies
- Konstantine Hovhannisyan (born 1911), professor, architect and archaeologist
- Sebastian Shaumyan (1916–2007), Soviet-Armenian and American theoretician of linguistics and an outspoken adherent of structuralist analysis
- Karen Ter-Martirosian (1922–2005), Russian theoretical physics scientist
- Sergei Parajanov (1924–1990), film director and artist
- Rafael Chimishkyan (born 1929), former weightlifter and Olympic champion who competed for the Soviet Union
- Tigran Petrosian (1929–1984), Soviet-Armenian grandmaster, and World Chess Champion from 1963 to 1969
- Evgeny Abramyan (born 1930), Soviet/Armenian physicist, Professor, Doctor of Engineering Sciences, Winner of USSR State Prize, one of the founders of several research directions in the Soviet and Russian nuclear technology
- Abel Aganbegyan (born 1932), leading Soviet and Russian economist
- Samvel Gasparov (born 1938), Soviet/Russian film director and short story writer
- Arkady Ter-Tadevosyan (Komandos) (1939–2021), military leader of the Armenian forces during the First Nagorno-Karabakh War
- Leonid Azkaldian (1942–1992), physicist, hero of the First Nagorno-Karabakh War
- Gayane Khachaturian (1942–2009), painter and graphic artist

=== Post-Soviet ===
- Sergei Movsesian (born 1978), chess Grandmaster
- Anna Kasyan (born 1981), French-based opera singer

== See also ==
- Armenians in Abkhazia
- Armenians in Samtskhe-Javakheti
- Armenians in Georgia
- Armenian National Council of Tiflis
