= Tserents =

Armenian writer

Tserents or Dzerents
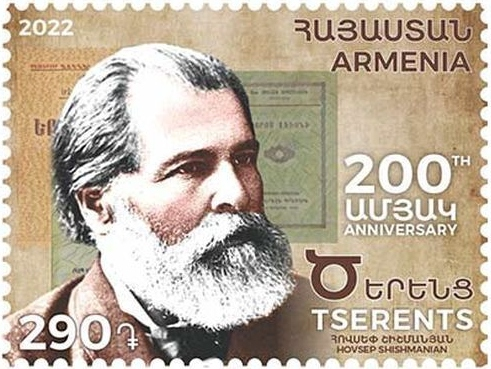
- Tserents on a 2022 stamp of Armenia
- Born: 16 September 1822; Constantinople
- Died: 1 February 1888 (aged 65); Tiflis, Russian Empire (present-day Tbilisi, Georgia)
- Occupations: writer, doctor

Tserents (Armenian: Ծերենց, born Hovsep Shishmanian, (Armenian: Յովսէփ Շիշմանեան; September 16 (28), 1822 – February 1 (13), 1888) was a prominent Armenian writer.

== Biography ==
Tserents/Dzerents studied at Venice, at the San Lazzaro degli Armeni of the Mekhitarist Order between 1831 and 1837 and continued his education in Paris (1848–1853). He returned to Constantinople in 1853 and lived for several years in Cyprus, working as a teacher and a scientist. Among with his daughter he moved to Tiflis in 1878, and worked as a teacher in the Nersisyan Armenian gymnasium. During that period as a doctor he visited Van, Alashkert, Basean and other towns of Western Armenia.

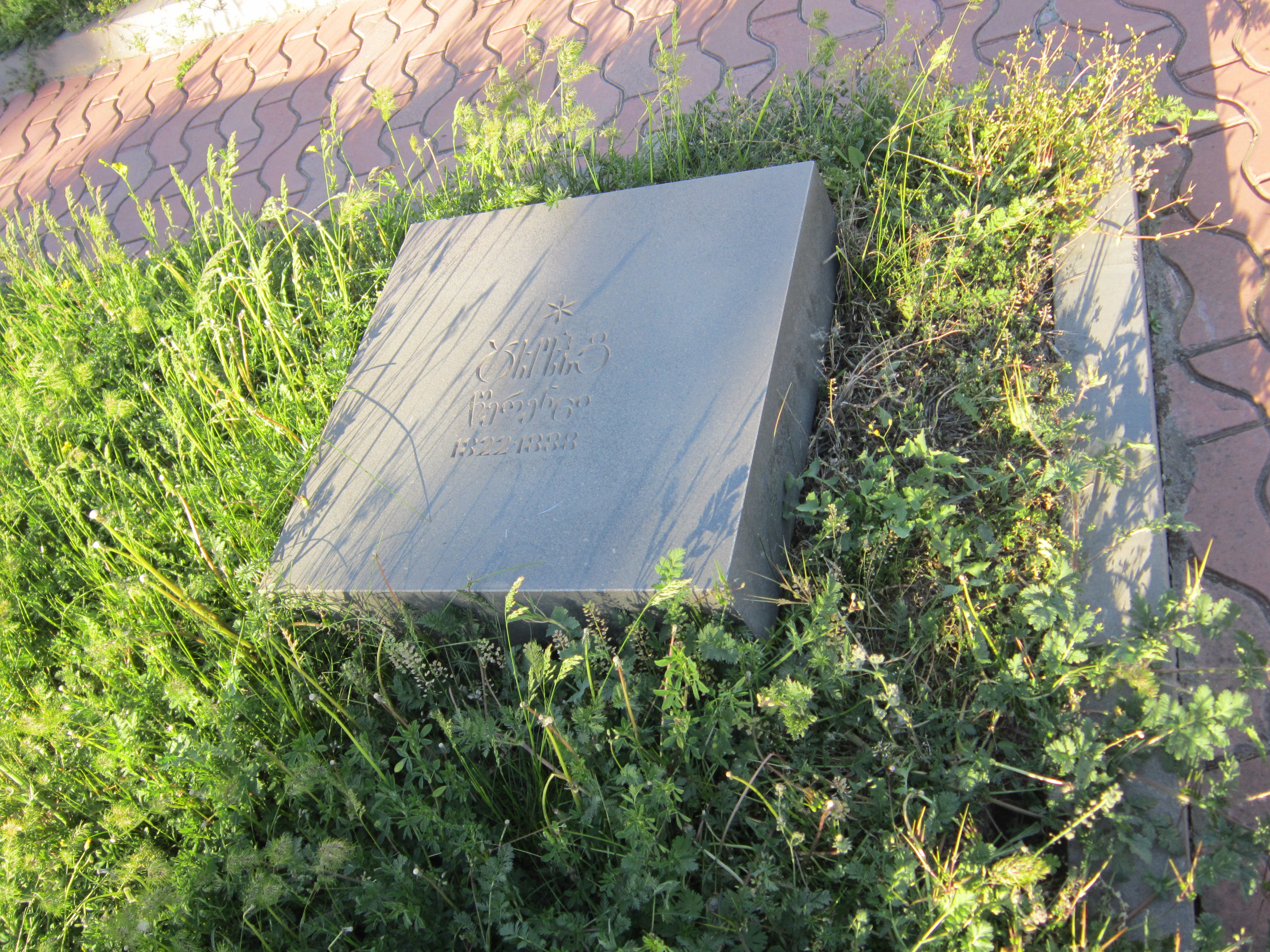
The tombstone of Dzerents in Khojivank

He is buried at the Armenian Pantheon of Tbilisi.

== Works ==
Together with Raffi, Tserents was the founder of the Armenian historical novel. The novel Thoros of Levon (1877) was dedicated to the tragic events in the history of the Armenian Kingdom of Cilicia in the 12th century. His best known novel, The Travails of the 9th Century (1879), reflects the liberation struggle of the Armenian people against the Abbasid Caliphate in the 9th century. Tserents' novel Theodoros Rshtuni (1881) is about the historic struggle of the 7th century for a strong centralized state.
