= Nersisian School =

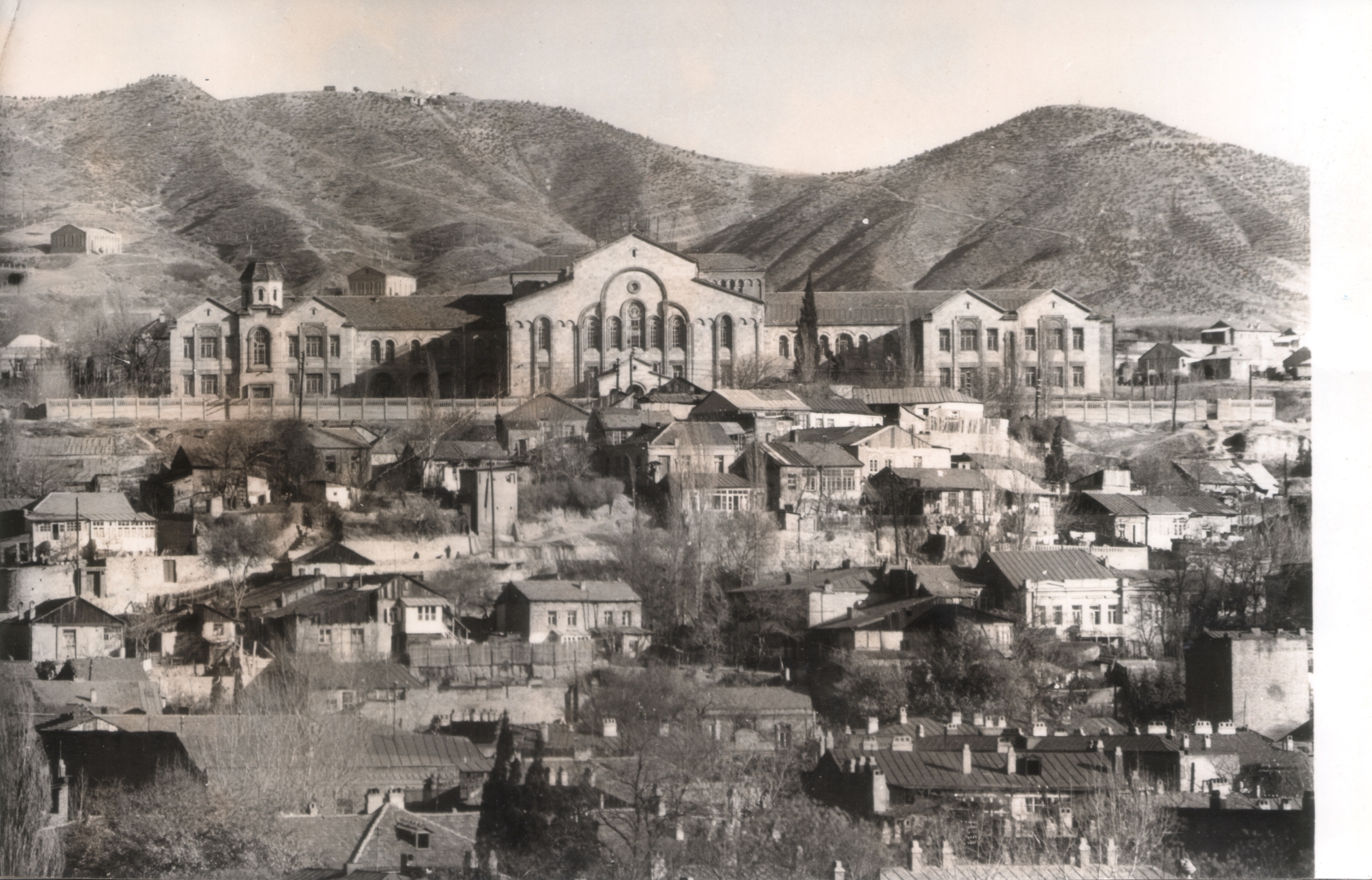
- 1824-1905: Soldatskiy Bazar Square; Tiflis, Tiflis Governorate; Russian Empire

Information
- Religious affiliation: Armenian Apostolic
- Opened: 1824
- Founder: Catholicos Nerses V
- Closed: 1924
- Grades: 3
- Gender: Male
- Enrollment: 80
- Language: Armenian

Nersisian School (Armenian: Ներսիսեան դպրոց, Nersisian Dprots; Georgian: ნერსისიანის სემინარია, Nersisyanis seminaria; Russian: Нерсесяновское училище, romanized: Nersisyanovskoye učilišče) was an Armenian higher education institution in the city of Tiflis, then Russian Empire (now Tbilisi, Georgia). It operated exactly for one century, from 1824 to 1924. It was founded by Bishop Nerses V Ashtaraketsi, Armenian primate of the diocese of Georgia (later Catholicos of All Armenians Nerses V), after whom it was named.

== History ==
In the 19th century Tiflis (Tbilisi) was a major Armenian cultural center with a large Armenian population. Numerous Armenian schools, various publications, drama associations and societies, charities and nonprofit organizations functioned in the city. The Nersisian School officially opened in 1824 and throughout its existence it had a unique role in Eastern Armenian education.

In 1905, the school was destroyed in a bombing. Afterward, Alexander Mantashev solved all the school's financial problems with the designing and building of the school by a Russian-Armenian military architect Nikita Lazarev. The façade of the building was built of an orange stone from the Tsater (Lori) and Karahunj (Zangezur) villages. Alexander Mantashev spent 370,000 rubles (444 kg/gold) during the construction of the new building. In front of the school stood statues of Nerses Ashtaraketsi and Alexander Mantashev.

== Notable alumni ==
The following is the list of notable alumni of the Nersisian School with the year of graduation in parentheses:

- Khachatur Abovian (born 1826), writer
- Perch Proshyan (born 1856), writer
- Derenik Demirchian (born 1898), writer and novelist
- Karo Halabyan (born 1917), architect
- Yervand Kochar (born 1918), sculptor
- Anastas Mikoyan, Soviet statesman
- Soghomon Tehlirian, assassin of Talaat Pasha, one of the main perpetrators of the Armenian Genocide
- Arshak Ter-Gukasov, Russian Armenian military commander
- Hayk Bzhishkyan, military commander
- Gabriel Sundukian, writer and playwright
- Nikol Aghbalian, historian
- Artashes Abeghyan, philologist, historian and politician

Not graduated

- Ghazaros Aghayan, writer, educator and folklorist (1853–1854)
- Hovhannes Tumanyan, writer (1883–1887)

== See also ==
- Armenians in Tbilisi
- Education in Armenia
  - Gevorgian Seminary
  - Vaskenian Theological Academy
- Education in Georgia
