= Perch Proshian =

Armenian writer and educator

Perch Proshyan
- Պերճ Պռոշյան
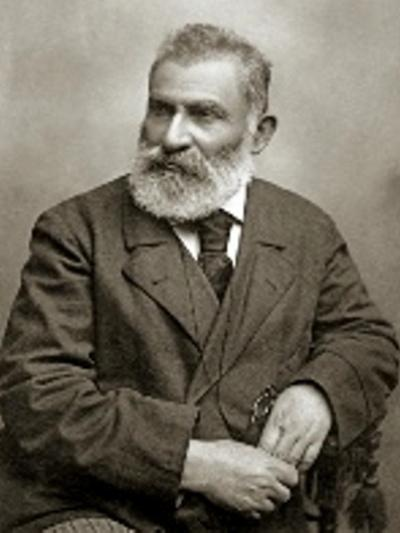
- Born: Hovhannes Ter-Arakelian; 15 June 1837; Ashtarak, Erivan Governorate, Russian Empire (present-day Ashtarak, Armenia)
- Died: 23 November 1907 (aged 70); Baku, Baku Governorate, Russian Empire
- Resting place: Armenian Pantheon of Tbilisi
- Education: Nersisian School
- Occupations: writer, educator
- Writing career
- Language: Armenian

Perch Proshyan (Armenian: Պերճ Պռօշեան, (Note: Reformed orthography: Պերճ Պռոշյան. Also Proshyan.) born Hovhannes Ter-Arakelian; 15 June [O.S. 3 June] 1837 – 23 November 1907) was an Armenian writer and educator.

== Biography ==
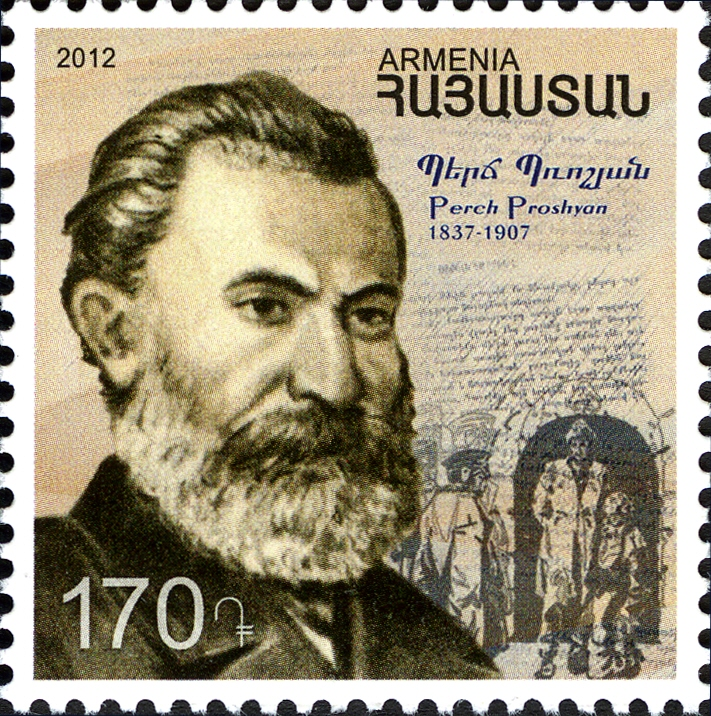
Perch Proshian on a 2012 Armenian stamp

Proshian was born in a tailor's family in Ashtarak. He received his primary education at his hometown's parish school, at the monastic school of Mughni (1849–52), and, briefly, at state schools in Erivan (Yerevan). In 1856, he graduated from the Nersisian School of Tiflis (Tbilisi), where, according to Sergey Sarinian, his patriotic-democratic views formed under the influence of educator Petros Shanshian. After studying for one year at Tiflis's state gymnasium, Proshian returned to Ashtarak in 1857 and was appointed inspector of the parish school. He also acted as the secretary of a local church official.

In 1859, Proshian went to Tiflis, where he taught a preparatory class at the Nersisian School. He actively participated in the founding of the Armenian professional theater and in the establishment of girls' schools in Tiflis, Shusha, Agulis, Astrakhan and elsewhere. He worked as a teacher in different parts of the South Caucasus and drafted school charters. In 1879, he was invited to Ejmiatsin and was appointed inspector of the Armenian parochial schools run by the Church dioceses of Yerevan and Kars. He held this position until 1881. He translated an Armenian gospel from Classical into vernacular Armenian, for which Catholicos Kevork IV awarded him with the title of Master of Theology. In 1887, he returned to Tiflis. He died in Baku and was buried in the Khojivank Armenian Cemetery.

== Literary activities ==
Proshian's first literary work was published in 1859. His notable works include the play Aghasi (1863), written on the theme of Khachatur Abovian's novel Wounds of Armenia; the patriotic historical novels Krvatsaghik (Apple of discord, 1878), Skizbn yerkants (The beginning of birth pangs, 1892); the romance Sos yev Varditer (proper names, 1860); and the realist social novels Hatsi khndire (The bread problem, 1880) and Tsetser (Moths, 1889). He also translated foreign-language works into Armenian, including Charles Dickens's David Copperfield, Leo Tolstoy's Childhood and Boyhood, and Eliza Orzeszkowa's Przygoda Jasia. His collected works were published in seven volumes in 1962–64.

== Museum ==
The Perch Proshian House-Museum was founded in Ashtarak in 1948. The museum exhibits more than 2,000 objects. The museum underwent renovation in 2008.

== See also ==
- Armenian literature
- Armenians in Tbilisi
- Nersisyan School
