= Nerses V =

His Holiness Nerses V Supreme Patriarch and Catholicos of All Armenians
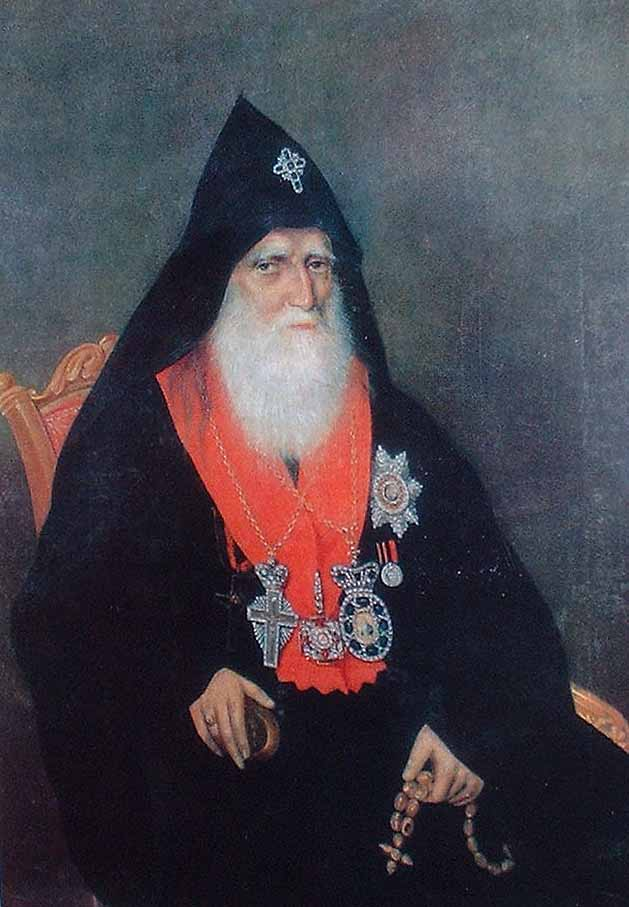
- Nerses V Ashtaraketsi, by H. Hovnatanian.
- Church: Armenian Apostolic Church
- See: Mother See of Holy Etchmiadzin
- Installed: 1843
- Term ended: 1857
- Predecessor: John VIII
- Successor: Matthew I

Personal details
- Born: Toros Harutyuni Shahazizyan; 1770 Ashtarak, Erivan Khanate, Iran
- Died: February 13, 1857 (age 86) Etchmiadzin, Erivan Governorate, Russian Empire
- Buried: Etchmiadzin Cathedral
- Denomination: Armenian Apostolic Church

Nerses V of Ashtarak (Armenian: Ներսէս Ե Աշտարակեցի, romanized: Nerses Ashtarakets’i, Armenian pronunciation: [nɛɾˈsɛs ɑʃtɑɾɑkɛˈt͡sʰi]; 1770 – February 13, 1857) served as the Catholicos of the Armenian Apostolic Church between 1843 and 1857. Previously, he served as the leader of the Diocese of Georgia from 1811 to 1830 and as the leader of the Diocese of Bessarabia and Nor Nakhichevan from 1830 to 1843.

Nerses V is buried near Mother Cathedral of Holy Etchmiadzin.

== Early life ==
Nerses V born in 1770 in the village of the Ashtarak, in Armenian family. He was the son of a priest, Ter-Harutyun Shahazizyan. His mother, Susambar, was an Armenian from Byurakan village. From the age of 8 he studied at the Gevorgyan Theological Seminary in Etchmiadzin. In 1791, he was ordained as a deacon, In 1794, he received the rank of Archimandrite.

== Gallery ==
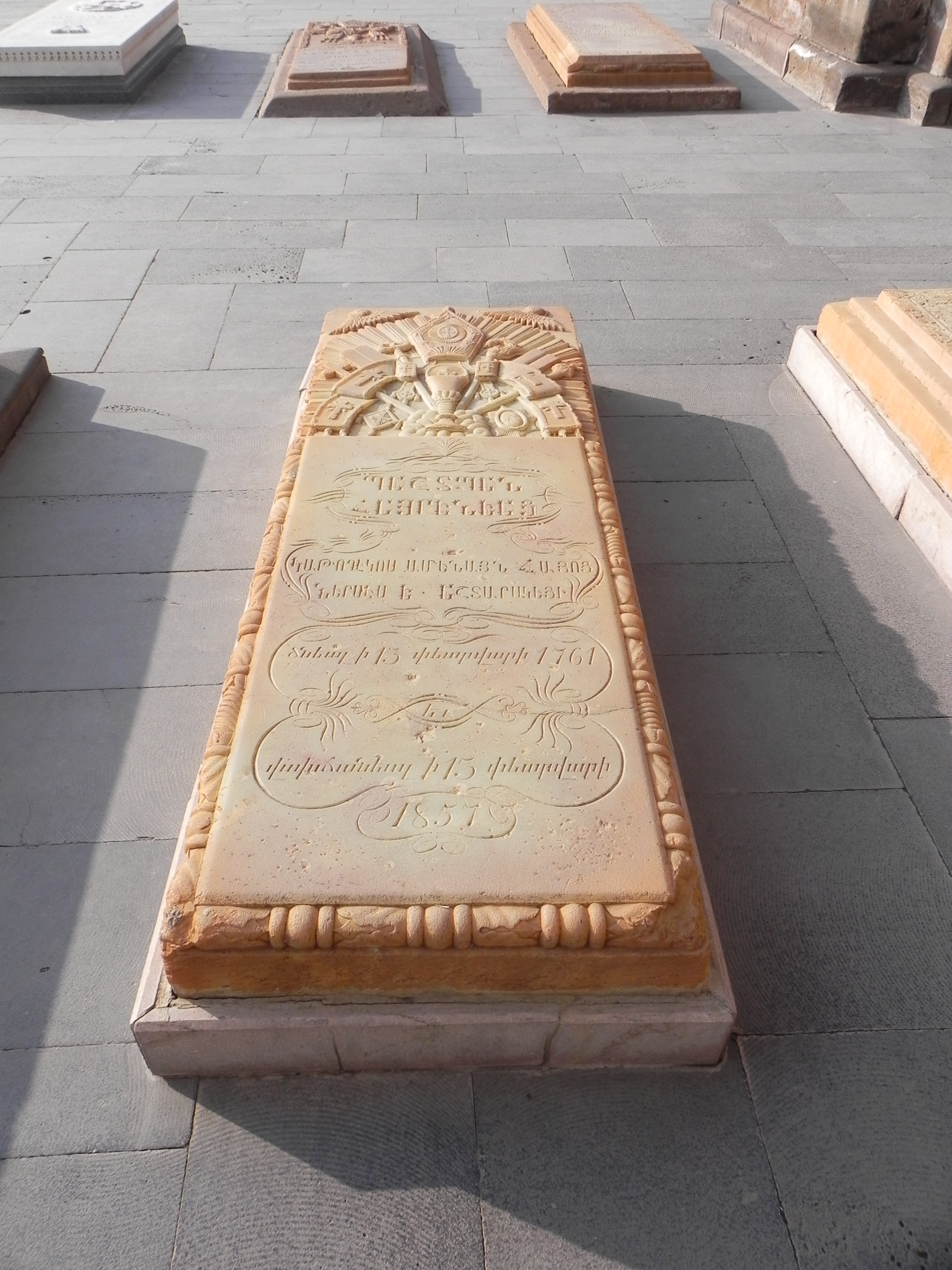
Tombstone of Nerses V near Mother Cathedral of Holy Etchmiadzin

== Awards ==
- Order of St. Andrew
- Order of Saint Alexander Nevsky

== See also ==
- Nersisyan School, was founded by Nerses Ashtaraketsi in 1824

| Preceded by John VIII of Armenia | Catholicoi of the Mother See of Holy Echmiadzin and All Armenians; 1843–1857 | Succeeded by Matthew I of Armenia |
