= Holy Trinity Cathedral of Tbilisi =

Orthodox Christian cathedral in Tbilisi, Georgia

Coordinates: 41°41′51″N 44°49′0″E

- თბილისის წმინდა სამების საკათედრო ტაძარი
- Holy Trinity Cathedral

Religion
- Affiliation: Georgian Orthodox Church
- Leadership: Shio III of Georgia
- Year consecrated: 2004

Location
- Location: Tbilisi, Georgia
- Interactive map of Holy Trinity Cathedral of Tbilisi

Architecture
- Architect: Archil Mindiashvili
- Style: Georgian cross-dome
- Groundbreaking: 1995
- Completed: 2004

Specifications
- Length: 70.4 m
- Width: 64.7 m
- Interior area: 3,000 m^{2} (interior); 3,200 m^{2} (exterior-stairs)
- Height (max): 86.1 m

The Holy Trinity Cathedral of Tbilisi (Georgian: თბილისის წმინდა სამების საკათედრო ტაძარი Tbilisis tsminda samebis sakatedro tadzari), commonly known as Sameba (Georgian: სამების ლავრა for Trinity), is the main cathedral of the Georgian Orthodox Church located in Tbilisi, the capital of Georgia. Constructed between 1995 and 2004, it is the third-tallest Eastern Orthodox cathedral in the world and one of the largest religious buildings in the world by total area. Sameba is a synthesis of traditional styles dominating the Georgian church architecture at various stages in history and has some Byzantine undertones.

== History and construction ==
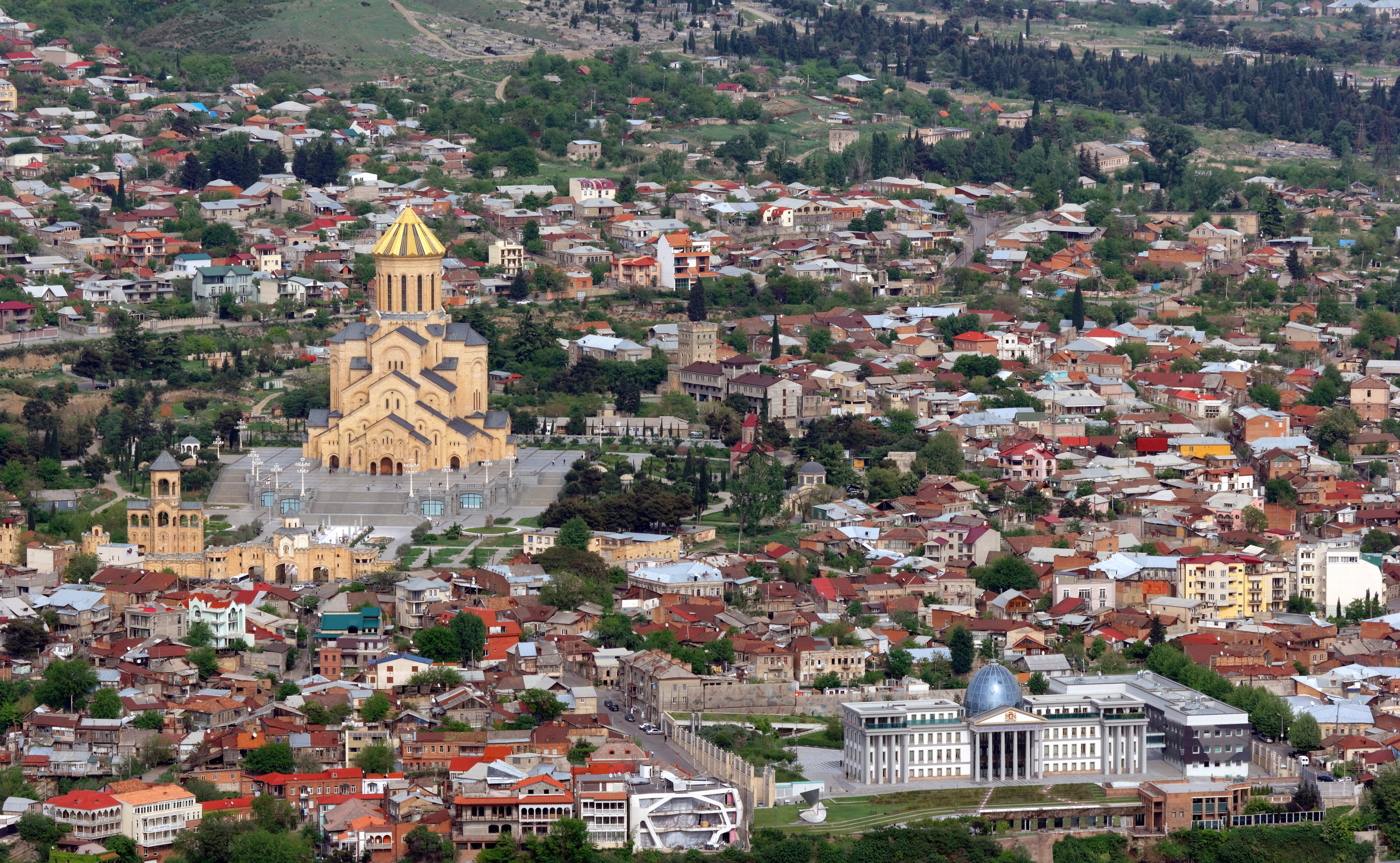
Sameba seen in the Elia neighbourhood along with the Ceremonial Palace of Georgia

The idea to build a new cathedral to commemorate 1,500 years of the autocephaly of the Georgian Orthodox Church and 2,000 years from the birth of Jesus emerged as early as 1989, a crucial year for the national awakening of the then-Soviet Republic of Georgia. In May 1989, the Georgian Orthodox Church and the authorities of Tbilisi announced an international contest for the "Holy Trinity Cathedral" project. No winner was chosen at the first round of the contest when more than a hundred projects were submitted. Finally, the design by architect Archil Mindiashvili won the contest. The subsequent turbulent years of civil unrest in Georgia deferred this grandiose plan for six years, and it was not until 23 November 1995, that the foundation of the new cathedral was laid.

The construction of the cathedral was proclaimed as a "symbol of the Georgian national and spiritual revival" and was sponsored mostly by anonymous donations from several businessmen and common citizens. On 23 November 2004, on St. George's Day, the cathedral was consecrated by Catholicos Patriarch of Georgia Ilia II and high-ranking representatives of fellow Orthodox Churches of the world. The ceremony was also attended by leaders of other religious and confessional communities in Georgia as well as by political leaders.

At least part of the site chosen for the new cathedral complex included land within what had once been an old Armenian cemetery called Khojavank. The cemetery once had an Armenian church that was destroyed during the Soviet period by the orders of Lavrenti Beria. Most of the cemetery's gravestones and monuments were also destroyed and the cemetery was turned into a recreational park. However, the cemetery still contained many of its graves when construction of the Sameba Cathedral commenced. The cemetery was treated with a "scandalous lack of respect" according to one author, after bones and gravestones appeared scattered all over the construction site.

== Architecture ==
Dome of the cathedral

The Sameba Cathedral is erected on the Elia Hill, which rises above the left bank of the Kura River (Mtkvari) in the historic neighborhood of Avlabari in Old Tbilisi.

Designed in a traditional Georgian style but with a greater vertical emphasis, and "regarded as an eyesore by many people, it is equally venerated by as many others". The cathedral has a cruciform plan with a dome over a crossing resting on eight columns. At the same time, the parameters of the dome is independent from the apses, imparting a more monumental look to the dome and the cathedral in general. The dome is surmounted by a 7.5-meter-tall (25 ft) gilded gold cross.

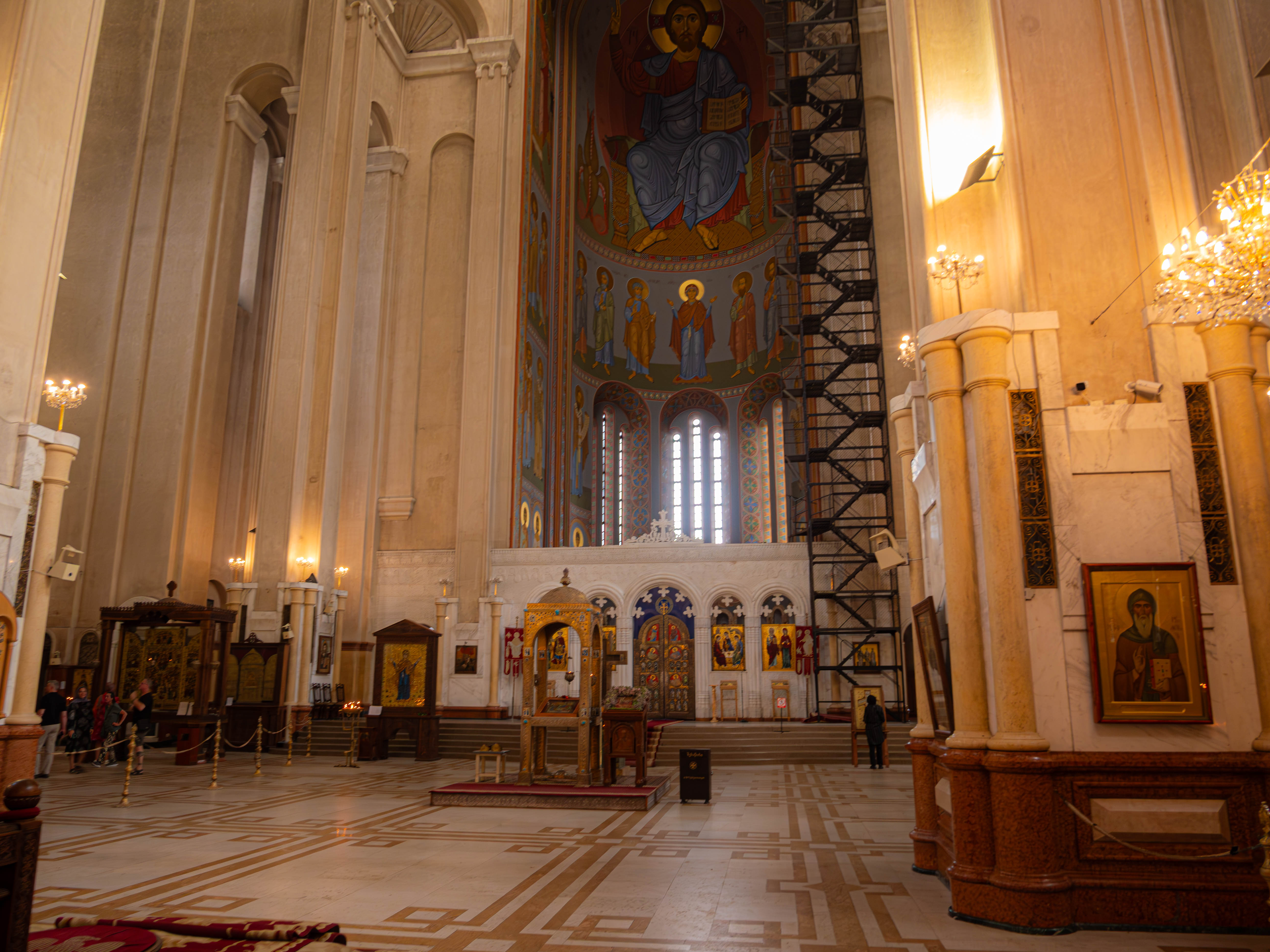
Cathedral interior

The cathedral consists of nine chapels (chapels of the Archangels, John the Baptist, Saint Nino, Saint George, Saint Nicholas, the Twelve Apostles, and All Saints); five of them are situated in a large, underground compartment. The cathedral mainly consists of two parts — above-ground and underground sections. The overall height from the zero level to the top of the cross is 86.1 metres (the cross itself is 7.5 metres tall). The underground section of the Lavra has two floors. The foundation of the cathedral is at a depth of 14.07 metres, and the floor of the lower level is at 13.07 metres (plus 1 metre for the foundation). According to these measurements, the total height of the Holy Trinity Cathedral is 100.17 metres (86.10 + 14.07). The cathedral's length is 70.45 metres, and its width is 64.68 metres. The total area of the cathedral is approximately 5,000 square metres.

Natural materials are used for construction. The floor is made of marble tiles and the altar will also be decorated with mosaic. The painting of the murals is being executed by a group of artists guided by Amiran Goglidze.

The Sameba complex, the construction of which is already completed, consists of the main cathedral church, a free-standing bell-tower, the residence of the Patriarch, a monastery, a clerical seminary and theological academy, several workshops, places for rest, etc.

== Historic events ==
Sameba Cathedral at dusk

In early January 2024, the discovery of an icon featuring Saint Matrona of Moscow, a Russian Orthodox saint, blessing Stalin sparked uproar. The presence of Stalin on an icon has been described as unusual by theologians. The icon featuring Stalin has been donated by members of the conservative Alliance of Patriots of Georgia. On 10 January, the icon featuring Stalin was defaced with blue paint, in an incident that drew press attention, and subsequent protests.

== See also ==
- Tbilisi Sioni Cathedral
- List of tallest church buildings
- List of largest Eastern Orthodox church buildings
