= Gayane Khachaturian =

Georgian-Armenian painter and graphic artist (1942–2009)

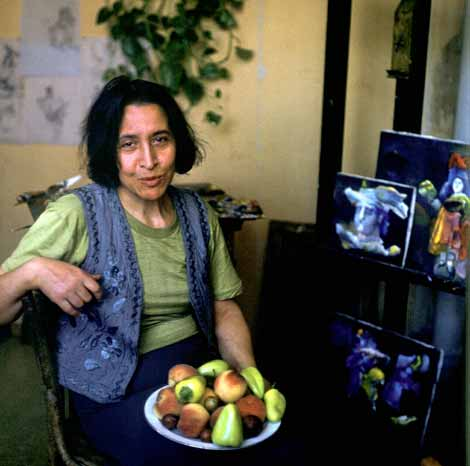
- Gayane Khachaturian
- Born: (Armenian: Գայանե Խաչատրյան); May 9, 1942; Tbilisi
- Died: May 1, 2009 (aged 66)
- Education: Nikoladze Art School, Secondary School of Working Youth
- Known for: Painter and graphic artist

Gayane Khachaturian (Armenian: Գայանե Խաչատրյան, Georgian: გაიანე ხაჩატურიანი) (May 9, 1942 – May 1, 2009) was a Georgian-Armenian painter and graphic artist.

== Biography ==
Gayane Khachaturian was born into an Armenian family in Tbilisi, capital of Georgia, and studied art at the Nikoladze Art School. She became seriously involved in the art scene after graduating from the Secondary School of Working Youth in 1960. She met Sergei Parajanov in 1967 at Elene Akhvlediani's house and they maintained a close friendship which lasted until his death. Some of Khachaturian’s works are permanently exhibited at the Yerevan Museum of Modern Art, the National Gallery of Armenia, Sergei Parajanov Museum in Yerevan as well as are in a number of private collections, including those owned by Valerie Khanukaev, Bagrat Nikogosyan, and Artashes Aleksanyan. When she was alive, her tiny studio on Bakinskaya Street had become a tourist attraction. According to Russian art critic Vitaly Patsyukov, "Khachaturian is among those pioneers of new artistic consciousness who draw into their focus all phenomenal aspects of European 'actual view' and the radical sensuousness and natural freedom of plastic gesture."

Khachaturian died on May 1, 2009, and is buried in the Armenian Pantheon of Tbilisi (Khojivank).

== Exhibitions ==
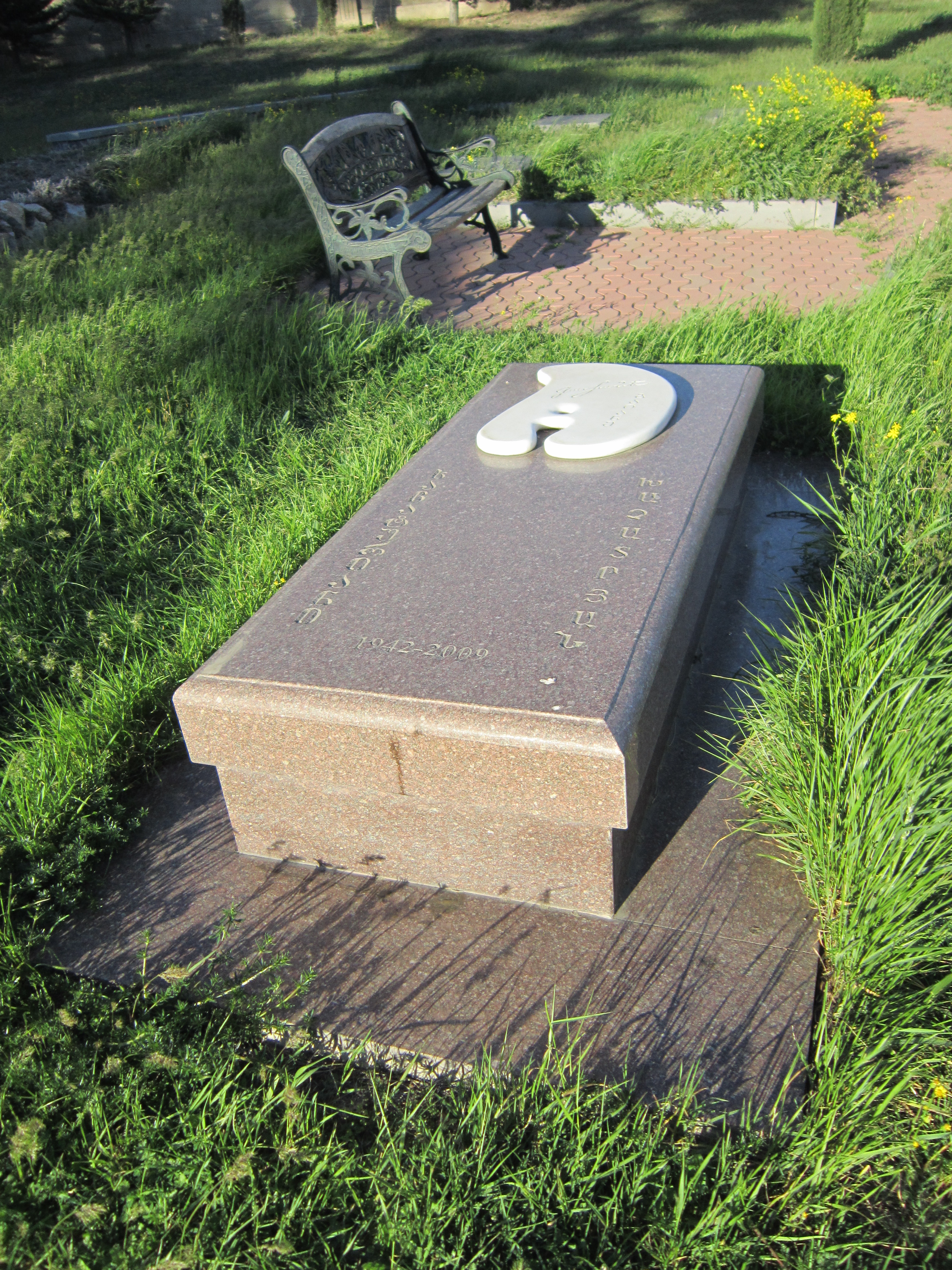
The tombstone of Gayane Khachaturian in Khojivank

Gayane Khachaturian's first informal solo exhibition was at the Skvoznyachok Café in Yerevan in 1967 by the invitation of Sergei Parajanov. Since then her work began to appear in various shows and exhibitions:

- 1970 — National Gallery of Georgia, Tbilisi, Group exhibition
- 1971 — House of Painters, Yerevan, Solo exhibition
- 1972 — House of Actors, named after A.Khorava in Tbilisi
- 1978 — Calouste Gulbenkian Museum in Portugal, Lisbon
- 1979 — Calouste Gulbenkian Foundation, Paris — Lyon — Marseille
- 1979 — Calouste Gulbenkian Foundation, Beirut
- 1987 — "Days of Armenian Culture" in Venice
- 1995 — "Contemporary Armenian Art," Paris — Metz — Poitiers — Pontivy, Solo exhibition
- 1995 — "The Paths of Armenia," Palace of Youth, Paris
- 1996 — National Gallery of Armenia, Yerevan, Group exhibition of Georgian and Armenian artists
- 2001 — "I Am Gayane from Tiflis," Nashchokin House Gallery, Moscow
- 2009 — "Painting — Film," with Andrei Tarkovsky and Sergei Parajanov, National Center for Contemporary Arts, Moscow
- 2009 — Armenian Pavilion, 53rd International Art Exhibition of the Venice Biennale
- 2010 — "In Memoriam of Gayane Khachaturian" National Gallery of Armenia, Yerevan

== Quotes ==
"On January 9, arrived Mikhail Vartanov. Parajanov's most devoted friend, an amazing man..."

== Films ==
Gayane Khachaturian appears in Mikhail Vartanov's documentary film Parajanov: The Last Spring
