= Alexander Tsaturyan =

Armenian poet

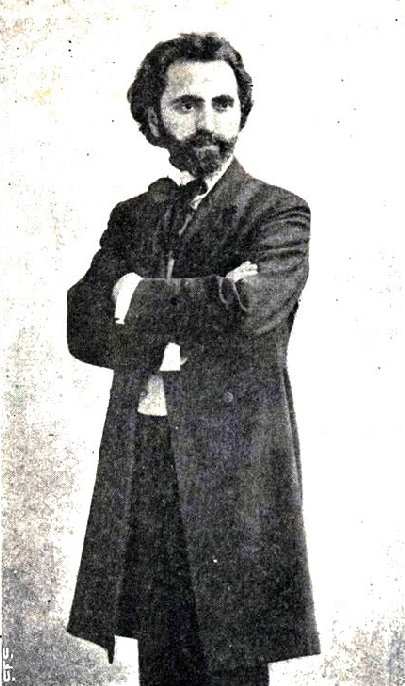
- Born: March 28, 1865; Zakatala, Zakatali Okrug, Russian Empire
- Died: March 17, 1917 (aged 51); Tiflis,
- Occupations: poet and translator

Alexander Tsaturyan (Armenian: Ալեքսանդր Ծատուրյան; March 28, 1865, in Zakatala – March 31, 1917, in Tiflis) was an Armenian poet and translator.

== Biography ==
Alexander Tsaturyan was born in Zakatala on April 11, 1865. He came from a poor family and received his education at a local church-parish school and a three-year district school. Later in life, he moved to Moscow and spent most of his life there. Tsaturyan started writing at a young age and was first published in 1885. His first collection of poems was released in 1891.

In addition to his original works, Tsaturyan was also a translator of Russian and European poets, publishing two volumes of poetic translations titled “Russian Poets” in 1905.

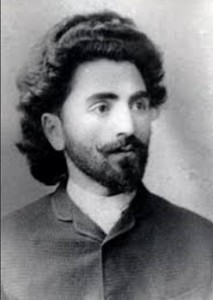
Portrait of Alexander Tsaturyan

== Works ==
Tsaturyan depicted the labor, suffering and dreams of his native people (cycle “From Songs of Suffering”, 1893), the struggle of workers against oppressors (“Lullaby of a Worker”, 1910). In the collection of satirical poems “Jokes of the Pen” (1901), Tsaturyan ridiculed the vices of the rich and churchmen. Many of Tsaturyan’s poems became folk songs. He died on March 31, 1917, in Tbilisi and was buried in Tbilisi at the Khojivank Pantheon.
