= Nar-Dos =

Armenian writer

Nar-Dos Նար-Դոս
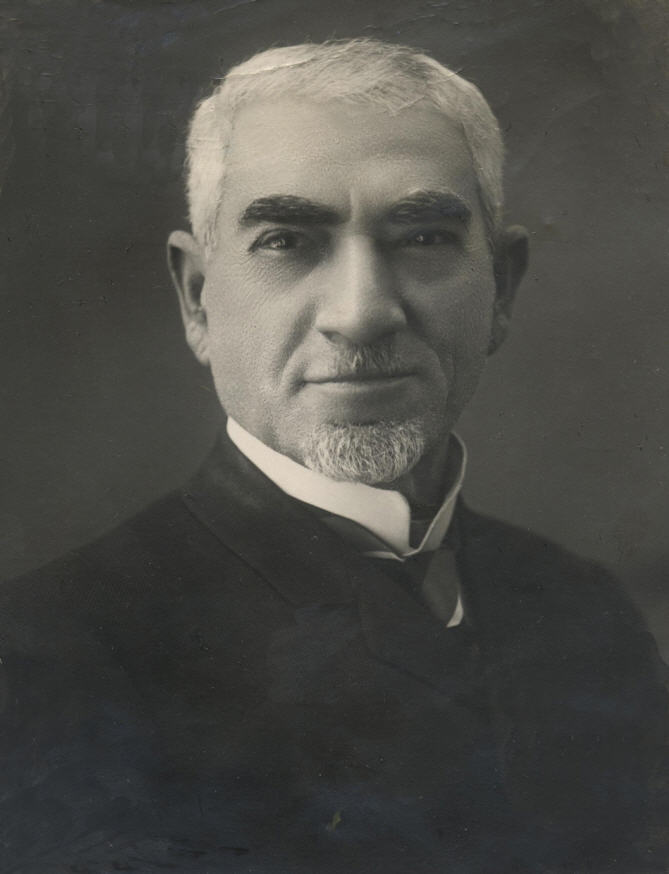
- Born: March 1, 1867; Tiflis, Tiflis Governorate, Russian Empire
- Died: July 13, 1933 (aged 66); Tiflis, Transcaucasian SFSR, Soviet Union
- Occupation: Writer

Mikayel Hovhannisian (Armenian: Միքայել Հովհաննիսյան; March 1, 1867 – July 13, 1933), known by the pen name Nar-Dos (Armenian: Նար-Դոս), was an Armenian writer.

== Biography ==
Nar-Dos was born Mikayel Hovhannisian to a wool seller's family in Tiflis, Russian Empire in 1867. He started his education in a parochial school of St Karapet Church, and continued at Nikolaev Municipal School. He later entered Khon Seminary in Kutaisi, which he did not finish because of its impoverished conditions, and returned to Tiflis. He was engaged in the profession of a locksmith at Mikayelian craft school where he met Armenian poet Alexander Tsaturyan.

A year later Nar-Dos left Mikayelian craft school and started practicing journalism. In 1890–1906 he was the responsible secretary of the periodical Nor Dar (A New Century). He worked as a secretary and proofreader at the journal Aghbyur-Taraz (Source of Fashion) in 1903, and for the newspaper Surhandak (Courier) from 1913–1918.

Nar-Dos began writing in the 1880s starting with poems, some of which were published in Araks in St Petersburg, and the "Sokhak Hayastani" (The Nightingale of Armenia) poetry collections. He also wrote stories, satirical articles and plays. Under the influence of Gabriel Sundukian, Nar-Dos composed the plays "Mayin's Complaint" ("Մայինի գանգատը"), “Honey and flies” («Մեղր և ճանճեր») (1886), and “Brother” («Եղբայր») (1887).

Under the pen name of Mikho-Ohan he published “Tchshmarit barekamy” («Ճշմարիտ բարեկամը»), “Nune” («Նունե»)(1886), («Բարերար և որդեգիր») (1888), “Knkush larer” («Քնքուշ լարեր») (1887), and “Zazunyan” («Զազունյան») (1890) in the newspaper Nor dar.

In the stories and novels of his first period he mainly describes urban life, focusing on certain social groups (“Our District” («Մեր թաղը»), "Hopop" (1890), "Hogun vra hasav" ("Հոգուն վրա հասավ") (1889), "Anna Saroyan" ("Աննա Սարոյան") (1888)). One of the famous stories of this period is “Me and Him” («Ես և նա»), written in 1889.

After 1890 a new period began in Nar-Dos' creative work. Well-known works of this time include “The Killed Dove” («Սպանված աղավնին») (1898), in which the author depicts the tragedy of an Armenian woman, “Struggle” («Պայքար») (1911), and “The Death” («Մահը») (reedited in 1912).

Nar-Dos died in 1933 in Tbilisi. He is buried at the Khojivank Armenian cemetery.

== Additional Reading ==
- A. J. Hacikyan; Gabriel Basmajian; Edward S. Franchuk; Nourhan Ouzounian, eds. (2005). The Heritage of Armenian Literature: From the eighteenth century to modern times. Vol. 3. Detroit: Wayne State University Press. pp. 602–608. ISBN 9780814330234.
