= Nikol Aghbalian =

Armenian journalist

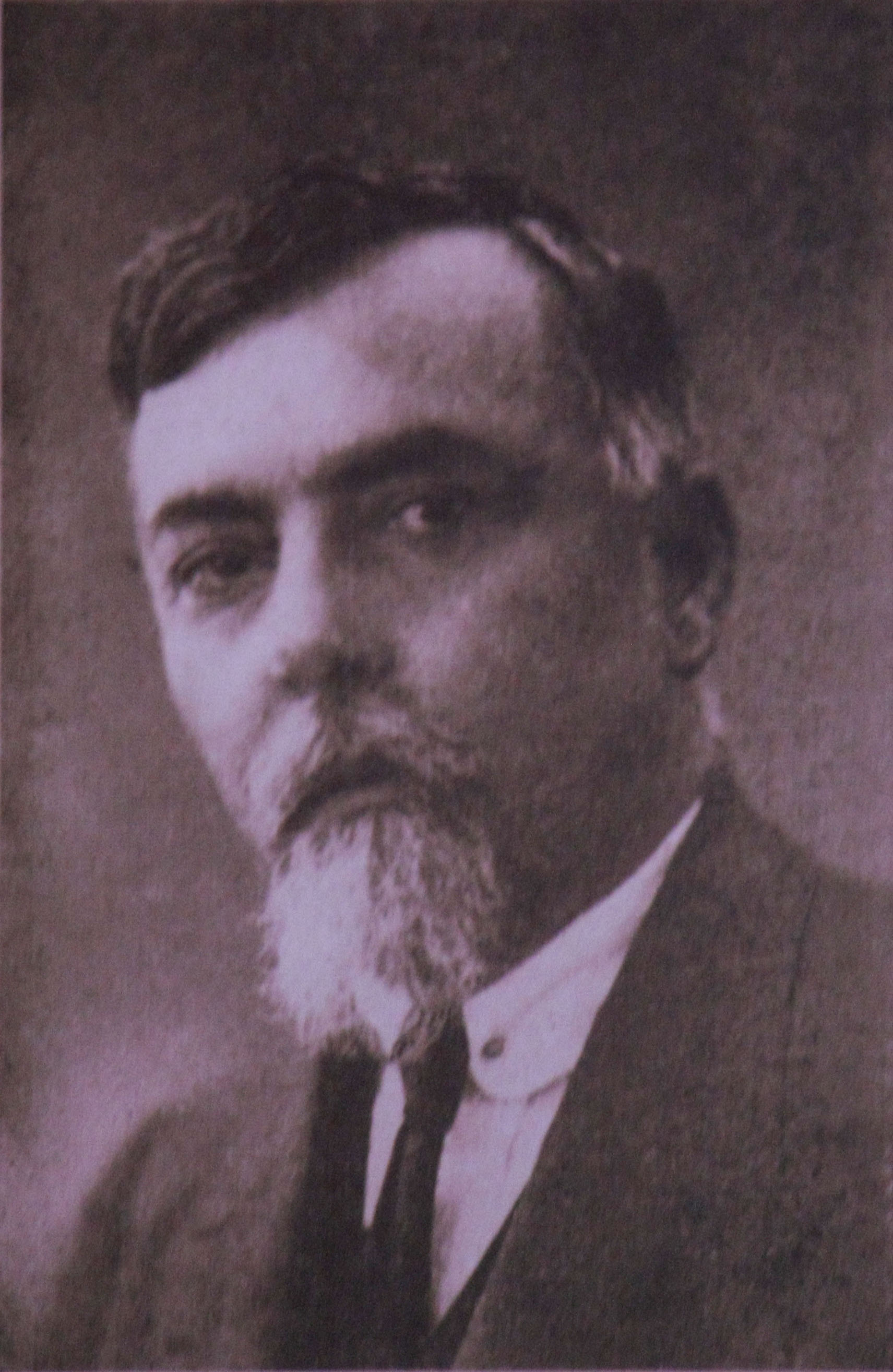
- Nikol Aghbalian portrait
- Born: 1875; Tiflis, Tiflis Governorate, Russian Empire (now Tbilisi, Georgia)
- Died: 1947 (aged 71–72); Beirut, Lebanon
- Education: Moscow State University Lausanne Sorbonne
- Occupations: public figure and historian of literature
- Known for: editor of Horizon paper.

Nikol Poghosi Aghbalian (Armenian: Նիկոլ Պողոսի Աղբալյան; 1875, Tiflis – 1947, Beirut) was an Armenian public figure and historian of literature, the editor of Horizon paper.

Aghbalian was born in 1873 in Tbilisi. His primary education was in Tbilisi's Nersisyan school, followed by a seminary education. He studied at Moscow State University, then in Lausanne and Sorbonne, worked as a teacher in Agulis, Shusha and Tiflis, and headed the Armenian National college in Iran. In 1914 he returned to Russian Armenia and participated in the National Bureau, working with the survivors of Armenian genocide. In 1918-1920 he was a member of Parliament, and in 1919-1920 was appointed Minister of Education and Culture of the First Republic of Armenia.

Armenian-American historian Richard G. Hovannisian describes Nikol Aghbalian in the second volume of The Republic of Armenia:

… Nikol Aghbalian was a gregarious intellectual and pedagogue whose restless disposition led him in many directions, including literary criticism, linguistics, and revolutionary journalism. Enthralled with the cultural vivacity of his people, Aghbalian, who had directed schools in Egypt, Persia, and various localities in Transcaucasia, took hold of the Ministry of Public Enlightenment and Culture with passionate enthusiasm.

Agbalian worked at the Hammer, Horizon, Balcony, Journal Amsorya and other periodicals. After the establishment of Soviet power in 1921, Aghbalian was imprisoned and subsequently emigrated to Egypt where he misspent the money of the Armenian Community and organised in 1928 the failed assassination of the chief of the community who had held him accountable - assaulting a prelate in the process who had come to his rescue. [Topouzian, H. Kh. Padmutyun Ekiptosi Hayots Karouti (1805-1952) [History of the Armenian Community of Egypt]. Academy of Sciences of SSR Armenia (1978): 258-259]. He was imprisoned with his accomplices in 1933 [Condamnation announced in AREV on 04.09.1933] and thereafter banished from Egypt. He then migrated to Lebanon, where he directed the Nshan Palanjian seminarium in Beirut. A soon as 1930 he published his credo overruling the rule of law of any country with his party's constitution and explaining his mode of action and crime in Egypt: 'If yesterday you were a simple soldier or squad leader, and today you become a government minister, you do not cease being a Dashnaktsakan who is subject to the [ARF’s] Constitution and Bylaws. And if Dashnaktsoutiun notices that in your new position you are attempting to think and work as a non-Dashnaktsakan, it will mercilessly unseat you, without regard to your fame or your position' ["Mtatzumner [Thoughts]” in DROSHAK 1929–30] .

Aghbalian died in 1947 in Beirut. Since 1991 there has been a "Nikol Abghalian" student union. Aghbalian secondary school No. 19 is named after him.

== Works ==
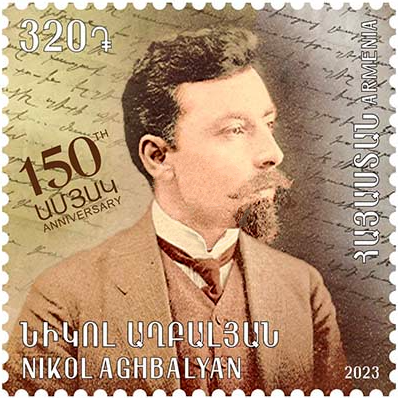
Aghbalyan on a 2023 stamp of Armenia

"Banaseri Memorandum" (1937–38) "Grakam critical Works" (1959)

- History of Armenian Literature, Beirut, 1947
- With Sayat-Nova, 1966.

== Sources ==
- The Armenian People from Ancient to Modern Times, by Richard G. Hovannisian, 1997, p. 329
- Lazian K., Demker hai azadakragan sharjoumen, Cairo, 1949, pp. 265–284.
- Concise Armenian Encyclopedia, Ed. by acad. K. Khudaverdyan, Yerevan, 1990, Vol. 1, p. 130.
