= Bebutov =

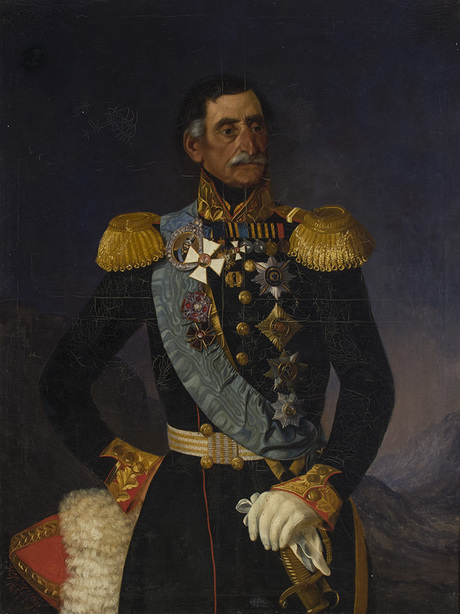
Portrait of Prince Vasili Osipovich Bebutov

The House of Bebutov (Armenian: Բեհբութեան, romanized: Behbut’ean, Russian: Бебутовы, Bebutovy) was a Georgian and Russian noble family of Armenian ethnicity which played an important role in the economical and social life of the city of Tiflis (Tbilisi) throughout the 17th and 18th century, and later served in the military of the Russian Empire in the 19th century.

== History ==
The family is known from the early 17th century when they migrated from Armenia to Georgia, and settled down in Tiflis, where they were known as Bebutashvili. By the mid-17th century, they had emerged as one of the wealthiest mercantile families in the kingdom of Kartli. In the 18th century, they served as ethnarchs of the Armenians of Tbilisi (with the title of melik-mamasakhlisi), and later also as Grand Masters of the Hunt (mishkarbash) at the Georgian court. In 1783, King Heraclius II of Georgia elevated the family to the title of Princes Bebutov and included it in the list of Georgian nobility attached to the Treaty of Georgievsk with the Russian Empire. After Russian annexation of Kartli-Kakheti (1801), the Bebutov family was received among the princely nobility (knyaz) of the empire in 1826.

== See also ==
- Vasili Bebutov
