= Motal (cheese) =

Armenian traditional cheese

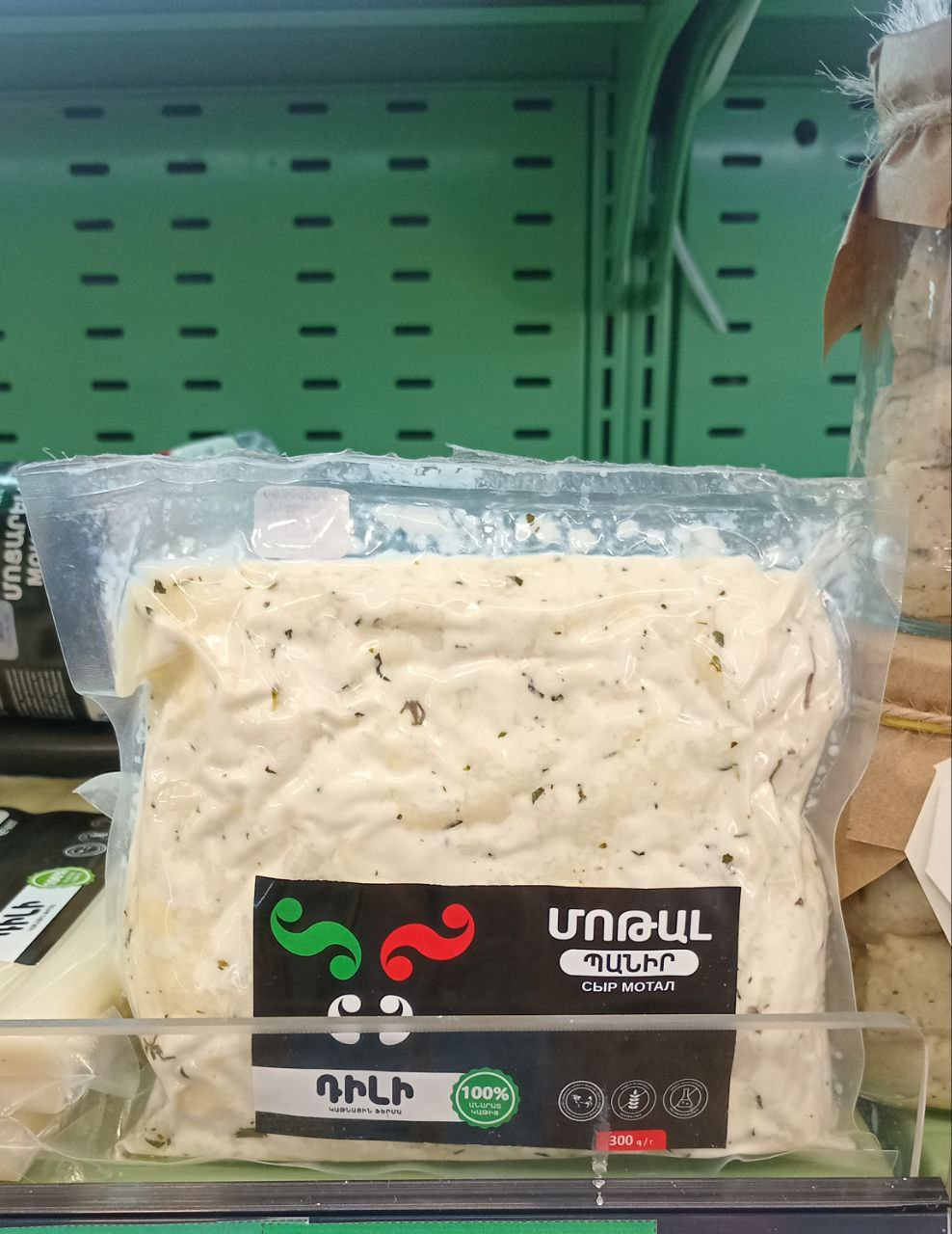
- Motal cheese on a store shelf in Yerevan
- Country of origin: Armenia
- Region: Syunik, Artsakh
- Source of milk: Sheep's, goat's
- Texture: Soft
- Fat content: 30–40%
- Aging time: 3–4 months

Motal (Armenian: մոթալ, Armenian pronunciation: [mɔˈtʰɑl]) is a traditional Armenian brined cheese, typically made from sheep's milk or a mixture of sheep's and goat's milk. It is characterized by its aging process in tik (Armenian: տիկ), which are leather containers made from sheep or goat hides. Motal is regarded as one of the highest-quality cheeses, comparable to French Roquefort and Italian Parmesan.

== Characteristics ==
Motal is a fatty, crumbly white cheese with no rind or external coating. During production, aromatic herbs—most commonly wild thyme—may be added to the curd, giving the cheese its distinctive aroma. The aging process lasts three to four months in cool environments.

The finished cheese typically takes the form of irregularly shaped masses weighing between 20 and 25 kilograms. In industrially produced versions, fat content ranges from 30% to 40%.

== Production ==
Traditionally, Motal is made from whole sheep's milk or a mixture of sheep's and goat's milk. In some cases, partially skimmed milk with added curd is used. The process begins with the production of a basic farmer's cheese (ktor panir), which is then crumbled, packed tightly into a tki, and left to mature.

In some farms and state-run factories, Motal may also be produced from off-grade cheeses or fragments of other brined cheeses. In these cases, the cheese is not aged in tki but instead stored in barrels.

== Distribution and consumption ==
Historically, Motal has been especially common in the regions of Syunik and Artsakh. In rural areas, it was traditionally stored in tki or clay vessels. Motal is typically consumed fresh—wrapped in Armenian lavash flatbread and served with herbs such as basil, green onions, and garlic.

== In literature ==
Motal is mentioned in the first chapter of the historical novel Wounds of Armenia by Armenian author Khachatur Abovian:

Կարասներով կողակ, կճճներով պանիր ու ղավուրմա, աքաշներով զոխ, բոխ, ողորմակոթ, բղղներով եղ ու կարագ, մոթալներով պանիր,— ծո՜վ, ի՞նչ տուն։ Խաչատուր Աբովյան, Վերք Հայաստանի ― Գլուխ առաջին

[Jugs of wine, clay pots of cheese and khavurma, bundles of dried fruits and herbs, cords of onions and garlic, chunks of butter and motal cheese — oh! what more does a home need?]

— Khachatur Abovyan, Wounds of Armenia — Chapter One (1858)

== Current status ==
In 2005, Slow Food created a project around Motal after being approached by Ruslan Torosyan. The project aimed to get local farmers involved in preserving the tradition and work towards selling a product globally. However, by 2016 the Slow Food project for Motal had ended.

According to international organizations focused on traditional food products, Motal has been listed in the Ark of Taste as a product at risk of disappearing. Today, it is produced in limited quantities and is recognized as one of the authentic cheeses of Armenia.
