= Karabakh dialect =

Dialect of Eastern Armenian

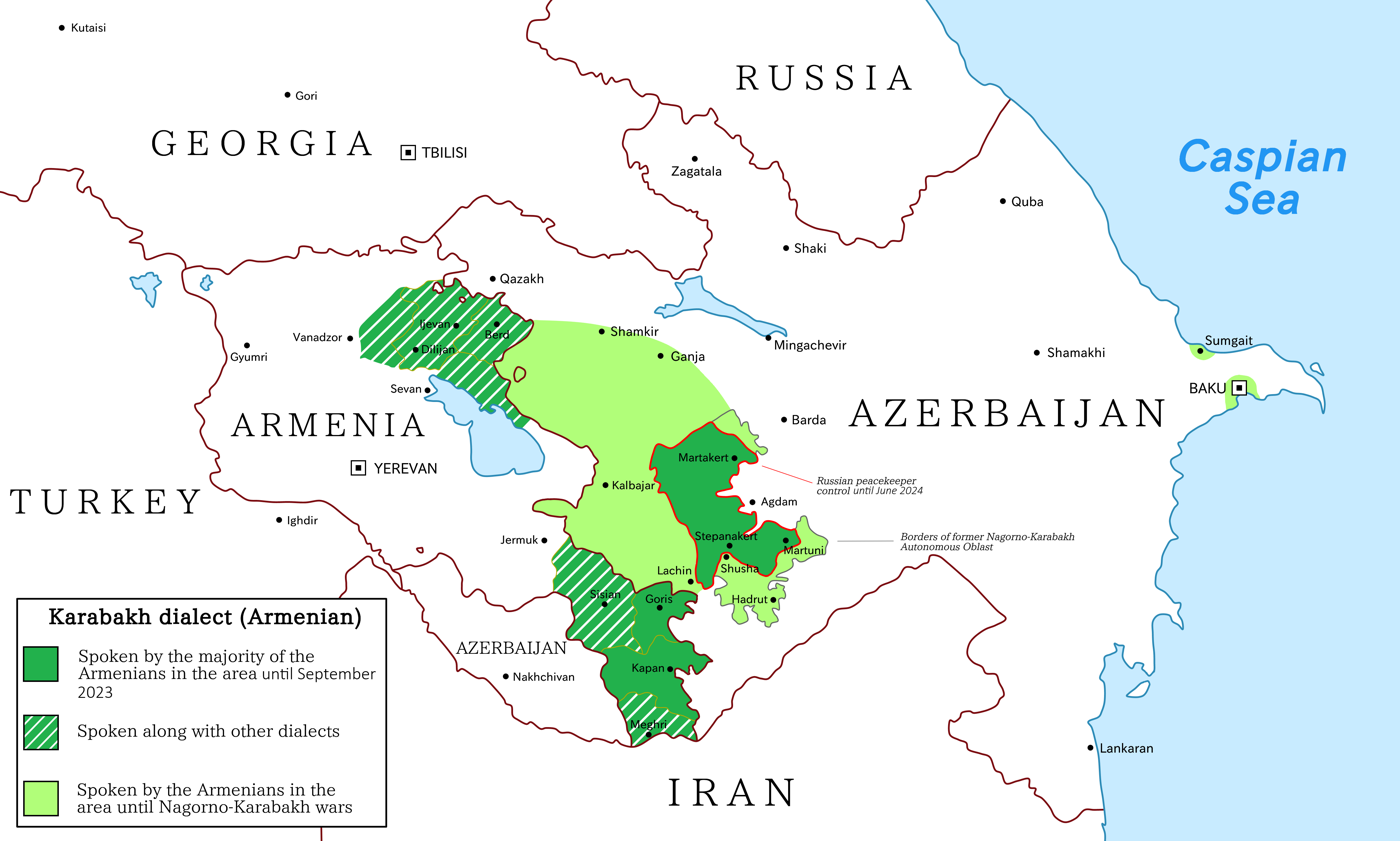
Situation of the dialect just prior to the Flight of Nagorno-Karabakh Armenians

The Karabakh dialect (Armenian: Ղարաբաղի բարբառ, Ġarabaġi barbař), also known as the Artsakh dialect (Արցախի բարբառ, Arc'axi barbař) is an Eastern Armenian dialect with a unique phonetic and syntactic structure. It was mainly spoken in the region of Nagorno-Karabakh prior to the 2023 Flight of Nagorno-Karabakh Armenians. Today, it is spoken in parts of southern and northeastern Armenia, as well as by the refugees of Nagorno-Karabakh who since 2023 have settled in various cities and villages throughout Armenia.

The dialect was spoken by most Armenians living in Soviet Azerbaijan, particularly in the cities of Baku and Kirovabad (Ganja, Gandzak). As the first Nagorno-Karabakh War escalated, Armenians of Azerbaijan were forced to leave their homes. Today, most of Armenians immigrants and refugees from Azerbaijan live in Armenia and Russia, where along with standard Armenian and Russian, the Karabakh dialect is sometimes spoken.

The dialect is considered to be one of the most widely spoken Armenian dialects. No accurate information on the number of speakers is available. The population of the Nagorno-Karabakh Republic was around 141,400, according to the 2010 data. An estimated 150,000 diaspora Armenians are originally from Karabakh.

== History ==
According to Strabo (Geographica, Book XI, chapter 4), in the 1st century BC, the population of Armenia, up to Kura River, spoke Armenian.

The 8th century Armenian historian Stepanos Syunetsi was the first one to mention the local dialect of Artsakh. In his «Բառք եղերականք» (Words of Tragedy), he wrote about the dialect of զԱրցախային meaning "of Artsakh", the historical Armenian name of Karabakh. According to the prominent linguist Hrachia Adjarian, Armenian dialects, including the Karabakh dialect started to develop in the 12th century. Adjarian argues that the damping of b, ɡ, d, dz, dʒ (բ, գ, դ, ձ, ջ) and their transformation to p, k, t, ts, tʃ (պ, տ, կ, ծ, ճ) took place before the invasion of Turkic people to the Armenian Highlands. In 1711 Karabakh dialect is mentioned by Johann Joachim Schröder.

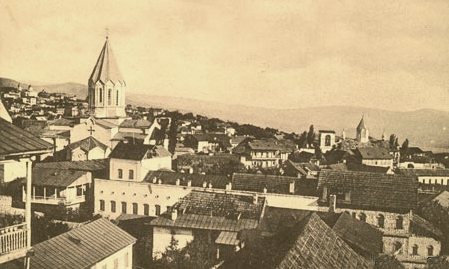
Shusha was the main center of Karabakh before the 1920 massacre and expulsion of the local Armenians by the Azerbaijani forces.

In his 1909 book Classification des dialectes arméniens, Adjarian claims that the Karabakh dialect occupied the largest area of the Armenian dialects. According to Adjarian, it was spoken in the cities of Shusha, Elisabethpol (now Ganja), Nukha (now Shaki), Baku, Derbent, Agstafa, Dilijan, Karaklis (now Vanadzor), Kazak, Lori, Karadagh, Lilava quarter of Tabriz (Iran), Burdur and Ödemiş (in Turkey).

Nagorno-Karabakh (nagorno means "mountainous" in Russian, comes from the Soviet-era name of the region, now used by the Western academia for political purposes of neutrality) has been historically populated by Armenians. Since the late Middle Ages, Turkic tribes migrated to the region and by the 19th century it was populated by both Armenians and partially by Azerbaijanis (called "Caucasian Tatars" at the time). After the Russian Revolution of 1917, Karabakh was disputed by independent Armenia and Azerbaijan with none of them completely controlling the claimed area. Karabakh was taken over by the Bolsheviks in 1920 and included in Soviet Azerbaijan in 1923.

Until the late 1980s, most Armenians living in Soviet Azerbaijan spoke the Karabakh dialect. The Karabakh (75% Armenian-populated before the conflict) was officially under jurisdiction of Azerbaijan and was known as Nagorno-Karabakh Autonomous Oblast (NKAO). Besides Karabakh, many Armenians resided in the cities such as Baku, Kirovabad, Sumgait. In the late 1980s, Baku alone had an Armenian population of over 200,000. They were mainly from Karabakh and many of them spoke the dialect, although Russian as the main language of multicultural Baku, including Armenians of Baku.

In 1988, with the relaxation of the Soviet Union under Mikhail Gorbachev and his policies of perestroika and glasnost, the Armenians demanded the unification of NKAO with Soviet Armenia. The mass movement started in mid-February 1988 and on February 20, 1988, the regional council issued a request to transfer the region to Soviet Armenia. Few days later the Sumgait pogrom took place, leaving dozens of Armenian civilians dead and thousands being forced to leave. This event is credited with unofficially starting the first Nagorno-Karabakh War. The clashes escalated to a full-scale war by 1992. Most Armenians of Azerbaijan and Azerbaijanis of Armenia were forced to leave. The war ended in May 1994 with the Armenian forces establishing de facto control of Nagorno-Karabakh and several Azerbaijani districts surrounding the former NKAO. From 1991-2023, the area was de facto under the control of the Nagorno-Karabakh Republic, but recognized de jure as part of Azerbaijan by the international community.

== Today ==
Today, practically no Armenians remain in Nagorno-Karabakh as a result of the 2023 Azerbaijani offensive; however, the dialect is still spoken by refugees living in Armenia and abroad. In the Republic of Armenia, the dialect is spoken natively in the Syunik Province by the majority of the population, except the city of Sisian and the surrounding villages, where the Yerevan dialect dominates.

The Karabakh dialect is also spoken in northern and northeastern Armenia, but it has been influenced by the other local dialects of Armenian. In Lori, it is spoken in the eastern part: the Pambak area. In Tavush, the Karabakh dialect is spoken along with the dominant Yerevan dialect. The Chambarak area of the Gegharkunik province is home to Karabakh dialect speakers, too.

== Dialectal features ==
The Karabakh dialect is very easy to differentiate from standard Eastern Armenian due to its unique phonetics. Unlike the Yerevan dialect (spoken by the majority of Armenians in the Republic of Armenia), the stress falls earlier in the word. Its speakers are "clearly recognizable." Besides including a great amount of Classical Armenian words, many word forms in the Karabakh dialect come directly from the Proto-Indo-European language. The Armenian Highland had been under foreign domination (Arabic, Turkic, Persian, Russian) for centuries and the Karabakh dialect, similar to other Armenian dialects, includes a significant number of foreign words and phrases. Azerbaijani, Persian and Russian had the biggest influence on this dialect.

=== Palatalization ===
The Karabakh dialect is among few Armenian dialects (others being Van and Khoy-urmia) with acute palatalization. Also known as palatization, palatalization refers to a way of pronouncing a consonant, in which part of the tongue is moved close to the hard palate, which softens that consonant. A consonant pronounced this way is called a palatalized consonant.

=== Unique sounds ===
The Karabakh dialect features unique vowels and consonants that make it phonetically distinct in comparison with literary Armenian language and many of other Armenian dialects. These sounds do not have corresponding letters in the Armenian alphabet.

List of unique vowels, expressed with the help of analogous Latin, Latin-derived and Cyrillic characters:

æ (ä): similar to a in English words maps, cap, or gap. Example: կեալ (meaning to come).

œ (ö): similar to oe in the word Goethe in German. Example: քըթէօլ (meaning spoon).

y (ü): similar to u English words mute or mule. Example: պիւլլիւր (meaning round).

List of unique consonants, expressed with the help of analogous Latin, Latin-derived and Cyrillic characters:

ɕ similar to Russian щ. Example: եշʲի (meaning see).

ɡʲ similar to Russian sound г with the Russian soft sign, or sound g in English word go but with the Russian soft sign. Example: կնէգʲ (meaning woman).

kʲʰ similar to Armenian sound ք or English sound q with the Russian soft sign. Example: խոխեքʲ (meaning children).

=== Lexicon ===
source: Armenian Wikibooks: Հայերեն բարբառներ/Արցախ

| Karabakh dialect | Yerevan dialect | Standard Eastern Armenian | Translation |
|---|---|---|---|
| հի՞նչ hinč | ի՞նչ inč | | what? |
| հո՞ւնց hunts | ո՞նց vonts | ինչպե՞ս inčpes | how? |
| հո՞ւ hu | ով ov | | who? |
| հո՞ւր hür | ում um | | whom? |
| շտե՞ղ šteğ | որտե՞ղ vorteğ | | where? |
| հունց ը՞ս hunts əs | ո՞նց ես vonts es | ինչպե՞ս ես inčpes es | how are you? |
| շտեղանս կյամ šteğans käm | որտեղից ես գալիս vorteğits es galis | | where are you coming from? |
| շտեղս քի՞նում šteğs kinüm | ո՞ւր ես գնում ur es gnum | | where are you going? |
| գյու՛դըմ չըմ güdəm čəm, hingidam | չգիտեմ čegitem | | I don't know |
| տի ti | էտ et | դա da | that |
| լոխ lox | սաղ sağ | բոլոր bolor | all |

| Karabakh dialect | Yerevan dialect | Standard Eastern Armenian | Translation |
|---|---|---|---|
| պեն pen | բան ban | | thing |
| խոխա xoxa | երեխա yerexa | | kid |
| դեդո dedo | պապիկ papik | | grandpa |
| բաբո babo | տատիկ tatik | | grandma |
| կնեգ kneg | կնիկ knik | կին kin | wife |
| տոռնը tořnə | դուռ duř | | door |
| լղար lğar | նիհար nihar | | skinny |
| քաչալ kačal | | ճաղատ čağat | bald |
| դյուզ düz | ճիշտ čišt | | right |
| հընգեր hənger | ընկեր ənker | | friend |
| հանցու վեր hantsu ver | որպեսզի vorpeszi | | so that |

== External media ==
Video

- Հավաքական արժեքներ - Արցախյան բարբառ [Collective Values - Artsakh dialect]. Public Radio Television of Artsakh (in Armenian) – via YouTube.

Music

- Armenoids - Karabagh. 2007 – via YouTube.
- Tim De Beatz (Artyom Hakobyan) - Alo, Alo. 2011 – via YouTube.: a pop song in Karabakh dialect that became a hit in Armenia in 2011

Unicode

- "Revised: Proposal to encode three Armenian superscript characters" (PDF).
