= Yerevan dialect =

Dialect of Armenian spoken in Yerevan

Yerevan
- Erevan, Araratian
- Երևանի բարբառ Yerevani barbar, Արարատյան բարբառ Araratyan barbar
- Native to: Armenia
- Region: Yerevan and surrounding villages
- Ethnicity: Armenians
- Native speakers: (275,000 cited 1989)
- Language family: Indo-European: Armenian; Eastern; Yerevan
- Writing system: Armenian alphabet

Language codes
- ISO 639-3: (included in Western Armenian hyw)
- Glottolog: erev1240
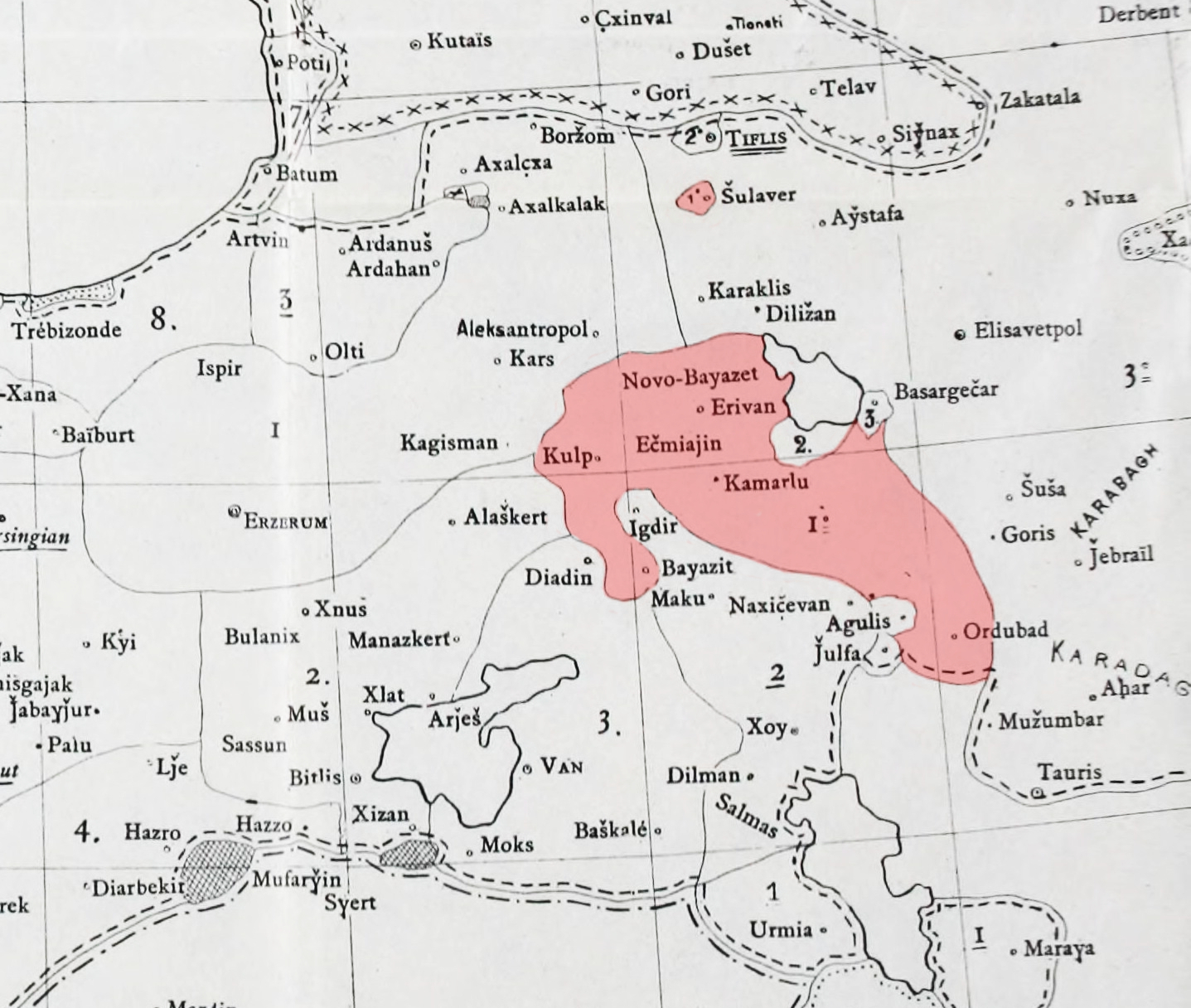
- The spread of the Yerevan dialect according to Hrachia Adjarian's Classification des dialectes arméniens, 1909

The Yerevan dialect (Armenian: Երևանի բարբառ, romanized: Yerevani barbar’) is an Eastern Armenian dialect spoken in and around Yerevan. It served as the basis for modern Eastern Armenian, one of the two standardized forms of Modern Armenian. Classical Armenian (Grabar) words, as well as native Armenian words which are not attested in Classical Armenian, compose a significant part of the Yerevan dialect's vocabulary. Throughout history, the dialect has been influenced by several languages, especially Russian and Persian, and loan words have significant presence in it today. It is the most widespread Armenian dialect today.

Historically, it was known as the Araratian dialect (Արարատյան բարբառ, Araratyan barbar’), referring to the Ararat plain where it is mainly spoken. In the 19th century, efforts were made to create a modern literary Armenian language. In 1841, the prominent Armenian writer Khachatur Abovian completed his novel Wounds of Armenia, which was written in the Yerevan dialect. The importance of the dialect grew in 1918, when Yerevan became the capital of the First Republic of Armenia. The Eastern Armenian language and the Yerevan dialect have been heavily influenced by the Russian language.

Today, the Yerevan dialect, which is the basis of colloquial Eastern Armenian, is spoken by nearly all native residents of Yerevan. In addition, virtually all dialects in Armenia, Republic of Artsakh and Georgia's Samtskhe-Javakheti region are influenced by the standardized form of the Yerevan dialect through the educational system. Most of the recent Armenian immigrants who have migrated to foreign countries since the late 1980s speak the Yerevan dialect.

== History ==
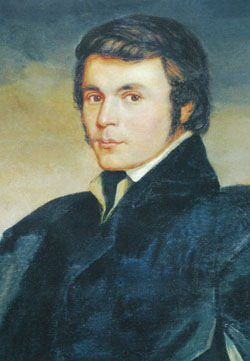
Khachatur Abovian is the founder of the modern Eastern Armenian literary language

The Yerevan dialect first appears in writing in the 13th century, in the writings of Vardan Bardzaberdtsi. The 17th-century Armenian merchant from Nakhichevan, Zakaria Aguletsi (c. 1630–1691), who kept a diary, also wrote in the Yerevan dialect, though with some influence of his local dialect. Some of the first written sources for the Araratian dialect are Arhest hamaroghut’yan (Art of arithmetic), published in Marseille in 1675, and Parzabanut’yun (Simplification), published in Venice in 1687.

The historical dialect spoken in Yerevan was usually referred to as Araratian, because Yerevan is located in the Ararat plain. The Araratian dialect was widespread, with rich vocabulary and pronunciation similar to Classical Armenian. These factors gave the dialect of the future Armenian capital a special status. It was used as a basis for the literary Eastern Armenian language. According to Gevorg Jahukyan, the Araratian dialect gained a dominant position due to geographic, historical, linguistic reasons and was used for inter-dialectal communication.

Khachatur Abovian, who is considered the founder of the modern Eastern Armenian literary language, wrote in the Araratian dialect as he was born in Kanaker, a village near Yerevan (now a district of the city). Abovian's famous 1841 novel Wounds of Armenia is the first recognized work in modern Eastern Armenian. Other authors contributed to the making of the Araratian dialect into a literary vernacular, such as Mesrop Taghiadian (1803–1858), and alumni of Lazaryan School, Nersisyan School, and several Shusha schools, including Gevorg Akhverdian (1818-1861), Kerovbe (1833–1889) and Raphael Patkanian (1830–1892), but it is widely acknowledged that the Araratian dialect was "made perfect" by Khachatur Abovian.

=== Area spoken ===
According to prominent Armenian linguist Hrachia Adjarian's Classification des dialectes arméniens, in early 20th century the Yerevan dialect was spoken chiefly in the towns of Yerevan, Nork, Kanaker, Ejmiatsin, Oshakan and Ashtarak. Adjarian points out the fact that the Yerevan dialect was also spoken in the Havlabar district of Tiflis (Tbilisi) and in the Iranian city of Tabriz.

According to linguist Ararat Gharibyan, the dialect was also spoken in the Vayots Dzor, Nor Bayazet, Lori and Spitak districts and formerly in Surmalu and Kaghzvan. Haykanush Mesropyan claims that Lori is the largest region where the Araratian dialect is spoken. The Araratian dialect was not and is not homogeneous but has sub-dialects that can be distinguished locally within the dialect area. The Yerevan sub-dialect of the Araratian dialect was chiefly spoken in the neighborhoods and villages of Kanaker, Arinj, Jrvezh, Nork and Kond. Yerevan's Nork district, which was a separate village until the 1920s, was considered the cradle of the Yerevan dialect.

The Araratian dialect has been relatively stable throughout the history, although the dialect had some influence in Lori (from Karabakh and Tiflis) and Gavar (from Mush). Bayazet variant usually considered a sub-dialect, although some linguists argued it was a distinct dialect.

== Modern ==
Today, the Yerevan dialect is the main component foundation of standard spoken Eastern Armenian. It is now more of a sociolect as it has lost the previous geographic limits and has been "fixed" by the standard Eastern Armenian. The Yerevan dialect now has some differences from the original Araratian dialect; in particular, it has been "cleaned" from other dialectal and foreign (Persian, Arabic, Turkish, and Russian) loan words.

The almost 160-year Russian and Soviet rule of Eastern Armenia (1828–1917, 1920–1991) had left its influence on the colloquial Armenian language. In everyday life, many Russian, Persian, Turkish, Arabic, and other loan words are used. During the Soviet era, the Moscow-based authorities encouraged the Soviet Armenian elite to "free Armenian from Arabic, Turkish and Persian influences." By the late Soviet period in Armenia, Russian was "widespread and derivatives were formed from Russian using native affixes", meanwhile Russian also served as a medium through which European terms entered into Armenian.

According to Razmik Markossian, in 1989, the Araratian dialect was spoken in 162 villages and 5 cities with the total of 275,000 speakers outside of Yerevan.

There is a tendency of increased significance of the Yerevan dialect within Armenia. Generally, Armenian television channels use the Yerevan dialect instead of the standard Armenian, especially in their entertaining shows, which causes them to be criticized by linguists.

In Yerevan, the local dialect is seen as superior compared to provincial dialects. Even if the provincial dialect words are much closer to standard Eastern Armenian, they are seen as "village language".

== Dialectal features ==
The chart below presents the pronunciation of the words "this way", "that way" and "other way" in standard Eastern Armenian, Yerevan dialect and Karin dialect as spoken in Armenia's second largest city Gyumri.

| Dialect | this way | that way | other way |
|---|---|---|---|
| Standard Eastern Armenian | այսպես ayspes | այդպես aydpes | այնպես aynpes |
| Yerevan dialect | ըսենց əsents | ըտենց ətents | ընենց ənents |
| Karin dialect (Gyumri) | ըսպես əspes | ըդպես ədpes | ընպես ənpes |

=== Conversion 'e' to 'a', 'che' to 'chi' ===
The word 'is' in standard Armenian is 'է' [ɛ]; in the dialect it is mostly said 'ա' [ɑ].

"This house is big"

Standard: Այս տունը մեծ է ays tunə mets e
Yerevan: Էս տունը մեծ ա es tunə mets a

The standard word for 'չէ' [tʃʰɛ], "is not", is pronounced 'չի' [tʃʰi].

"This house is not big"

Standard: Այս տունը մեծ չէ ays tunə mets če
Yerevan: Էս տունը մեծ չի es tunə mets či

=== Phonetics ===
The Yerevan dialect pronunciation is similar to that of Classical Armenian. It has three degrees of consonants:

| բ [b] | — | պ [p] | — | փ [pʰ] |
| դ [d] | — | տ [t] | — | թ [tʰ] |
| գ [ɡ] | — | կ [k] | — | ք [kʰ] |
| ձ [dz] | — | ծ [ts] | — | ց [tsʰ] |
| ջ [dʒ] | — | ճ [tʃ] | — | չ [tʃʰ] |

=== Conversion of simultaneous converb ending from -is to -uts ===
Armenian grammar has a standard simultaneous converb (համակատար դերբայ) form for every verb, the formation of which is realised by adding -is to the end of an infinitive – for example, in standard Armenian, Parel (Պարել) becomes Parelis (Պարելիս). However, in the Yerevan dialect this form is very commonly altered to one which is identical (but not semantically) to the ablative form of the nominalized infinitive. Thus, "Don't eat whilst dancing" "Mi ker parelis" «Մի՜ կեր պարելիս» becomes "Mi ker pareluts'" «Մի՜ կեր պարելուց».

== Lexicon ==
=== Foreign influence ===
Russian

Since 1828, when Yerevan was captured by the Russian forces, Eastern Armenian have seen great influx of Russian words into colloquial Armenian. Today, "some Armenian words are never heard in spoken Armenian, the Russian equivalent being used instead." Russian words are often pronounced as they are in Russian, but with stress on the last syllable as in Armenian.

Some of the most common ones are listed below.

- marshutka 'minibus' from marshrutka (маршрутка) is used alongside the Armenian yertughayin (երթուղային)
- svetafor (светофор) for 'traffic lights', although lusatsuyts (լուսացույց) is used more often
- klubnika (клубника) strawberry, although in recent years yelak (ելակ) is used more often
- galuboy (голубой) for 'gay' from Russian word originally meaning 'sky blue'
- bomzh (Без Определённого Места Жительства (without defined place of residence), БОМЖ) for 'homeless'
- divan (диван) for 'couch, sofa'
- ment (мент) derogatory term for a 'policeman'
- privet (привет) greeting often used by teenagers
- plan (план) for 'marijuana'
- vabshe (вообще, vo-obshche) for 'generally'

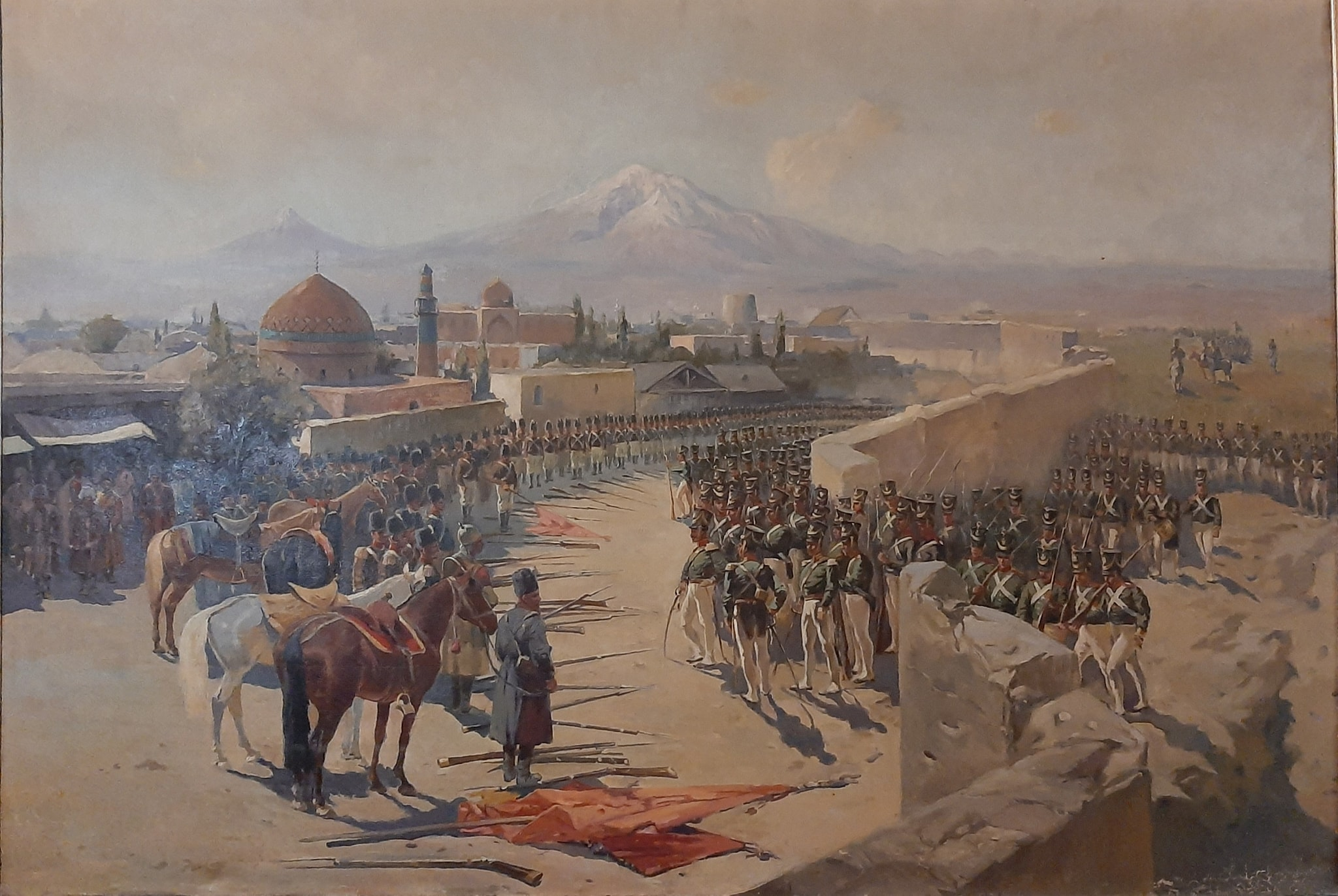
Yerevan Fortress siege in 1827 by the Russian forces marked the transition of Persian rule to Russian rule of Yerevan

Persian

For centuries, the current territory of the Republic of Armenia was part of the Persian empire. From the 18th century to 1828, the Erivan khanate occupied the city of Yerevan and its surrounding areas. As a result of long-time Persian control, today Persian words still have considerable presence in both literary and colloquial languages.

- չաղ čağ (fat) from چاق čağ
- քյաչալ k'yačal (bald) from کچل k'ačal
- հայաթ hayat' (yard) from حیاط hayat'
- դորջար dordjar (Four-wheel drive) from dhord jar (four-two in backgammon)
- քուչա k'ucha (yard) from كوچه kucheh (street)

Other

Other languages also have some influence on the spoken Armenian. Below are some foreign words commonly used in Yerevan.

| Word | Meaning | Original word | Meaning | Language | |
|---|---|---|---|---|---|
| արաղ aragh | vodka | عرق ʿáraq | sweat, perspiration | Arabic | the word 'vodka' is also frequently used |
| բոզ boz | whore, slut | ბოზი bozi | whore | Georgian | see Armenian profanity |
| զիբիլ zibil | trash, rubbish | زبل zibl | dung, manure, waste | Arabic | also used in Persian and Azerbaijani |
| ղզիկ ghzik | feminine boy, coward | qız [ɡɯz] | girl | Azeri | |
| մերսի mersi | thank you | merci [mɛʁ.si] | thank you | French | brought to Armenia by the repatriates in 1946–1948 |
| միտինգ miting | demonstration | meeting | an assembly of persons | English | via Russian 'митинг' |
| չենջ chenj | exchange office | change | to transform | English | used since 1990s, when first exchange offices appeared in the city |
| ջեբ jeb | pocket | جيب jayb | pocket | Arabic | very common in the region, also used in Albanian, Azeri, Bulgarian, Georgian, Greek, Hungarian, Serbo-Croatian, Persian, Turkish |
| սաղ sagh | all, whole, living/alive | sağ | right (direction), living/alive | Turkish or Azeri | |
| քեշ փող k'esh p'ogh | cash money | cash | physical form of currency | English | used since the 2000s |
