= Gevorg Bashinjaghian =

Armenian painter (1857–1925)

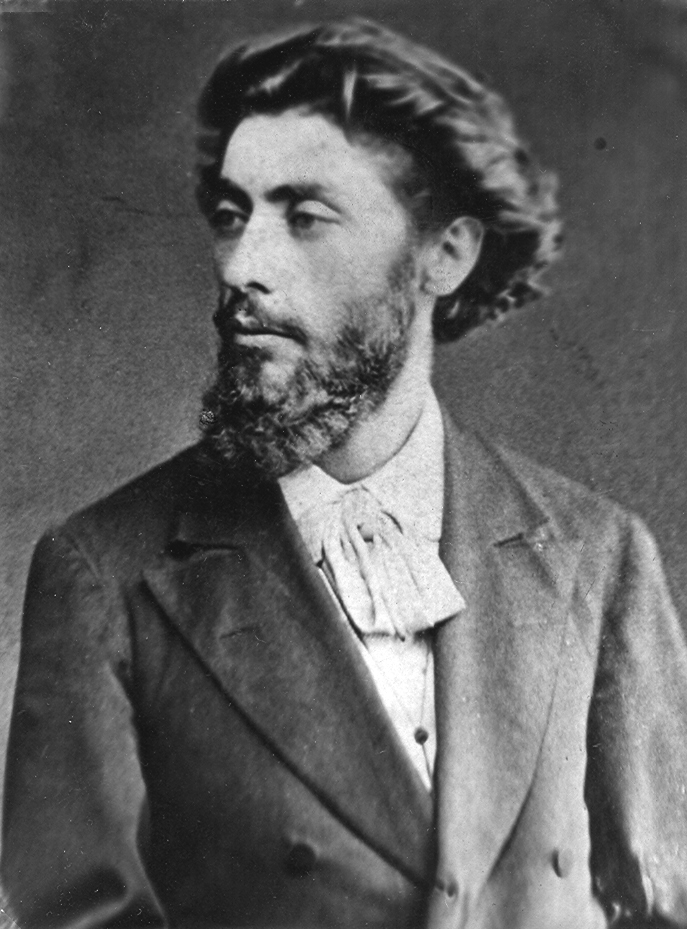
- Born: 16 September 1857; Signakh (Sighnaghi), Signakh Uyezd, Tiflis Governorate, Russian Empire
- Died: 4 October 1925 (aged 68); Tiflis, Georgian SSR, Soviet Union
- Education: Imperial Academy of Arts
- Known for: Landscape painting
- Movement: Realism

Gevorg Bashinjaghian (Armenian: Գէորգ Բաշինջաղեան; 16 September [O.S. 28 September] 1857 – 4 October 1925) was an Armenian painter who had significant influence on Armenian landscape painting.

== Life ==
Bashinjaghian was born to Armenian parents on 16 September 1857 in a small town of Sighnaghi in eastern Georgian province of Kakheti, part of the Russian Empire at the time. His father, Zakar, died in 1872 during a trip to Persia, when he was 15. After finishing the local school, he was admitted to the Arts School. In 1878, Bashinjaghian moved to the Russian capital St. Petersburg, where he became a student at the Imperial Academy of Arts a year later. Mikhail Clodt was one of his teachers. He graduated from the Academy in 1883, also winning a silver medal for his Birch Grove.

He returned to his hometown Sighnaghi the same year and soon started to travel throughout the Caucasus: Lake Sevan, Yerevan, Ashtarak and the holy capital of the Armenian Church - Ejmiatsin, Georgia and the Northern Caucasus, which caused the artist to make a row of canvas of the local landscapes. During the next year, Bashinjaghian visited Italy and Switzerland, where he learnt about the classic European art and also saw the Alps. He later wrote that "the Alps are beautiful, but they cannot win your heart if you have seen the Caucasus."

He returned to Russia and settled in Tiflis, the largest city of the Caucasus and the cultural center of Armenians of Russia. In 1890s Bashinjaghian had exhibitions in Moscow, Odessa, St. Petersburg and Novocherkassk. In 1897, he created a series of oil painting of Ani, the medieval Armenian capital of thousand churches. From 1899 to 1901, Bashinjaghian lived in Paris with his wife Ashkhen Katanian and their three children. In France, he made a trip throughout the country and produced over 30 paintings. In 1923 Bashinjaghian became a member of the Armenian Artists' Society.

Bashinjaghian died on 4 October 1925 in Tiflis and was buried at the side of Sayat-Nova's tomb in the backyard of Saint George Cathedral.

Exhibitions of Bashinjaghian's works were held in Yerevan, Moscow St. Petersburg and Riga, many of them in 1957–1958, in memory of the 100th anniversary of his birth. A street in Yerevan is named after him.

== Works ==
Bashinjaghian's best known works include Birch Grove (1883), Alazani Valley (1902), Ararat (1912). All are in the National Gallery of Armenia in Yerevan. His other works are located in Art Museum of Georgia, Museum of Oriental Art (Moscow), and the Tretyakov Gallery in Moscow.

== Gallery ==
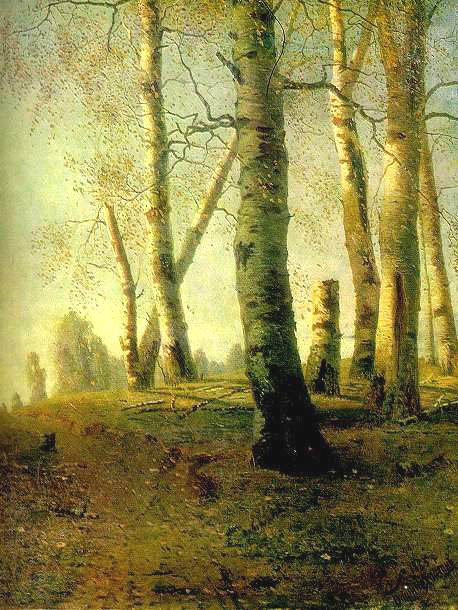
Birch Grove

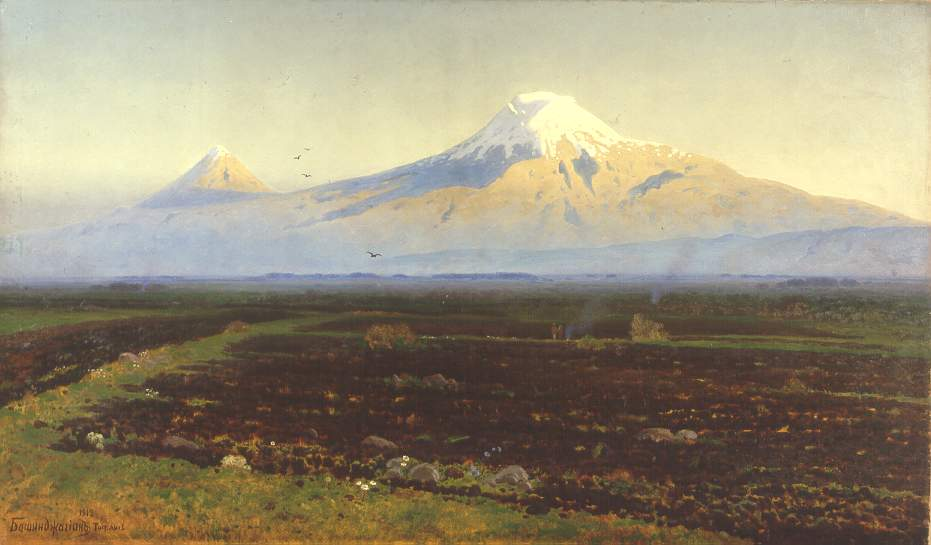
Ararat

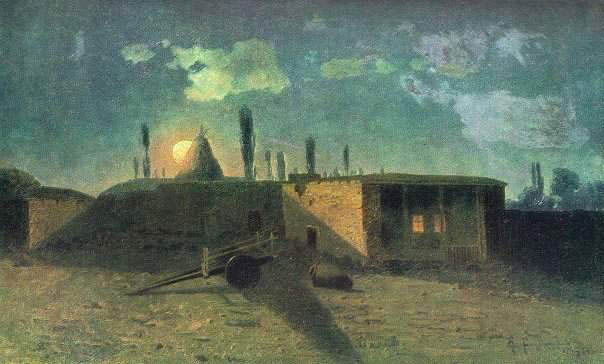
Khachatur Abovian's house in Kanaker

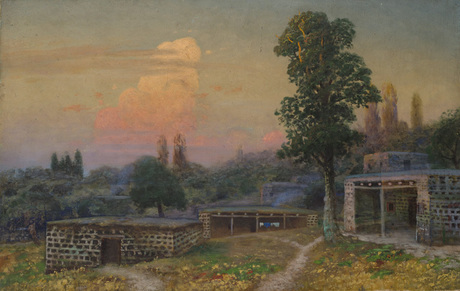
Armenian Village at Sunrise

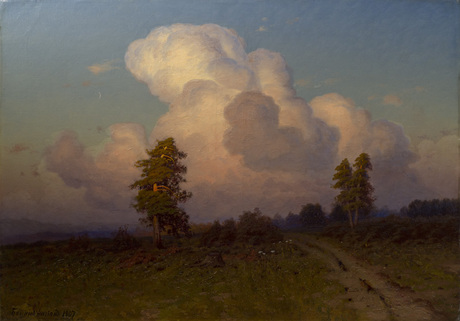
Landscape with Pines

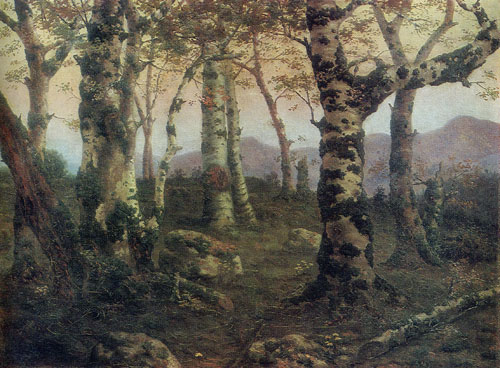
Untitled landscape

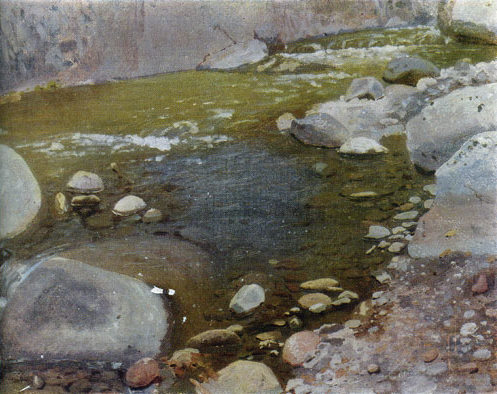
Stones in the Argichi River

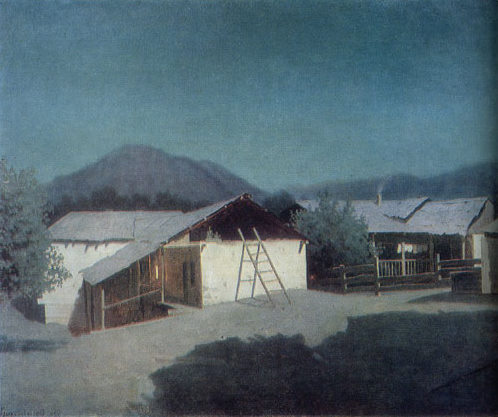
View in the Countryside

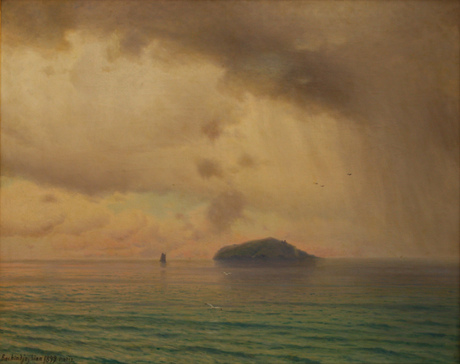
Rainy Day at Lake Sevan

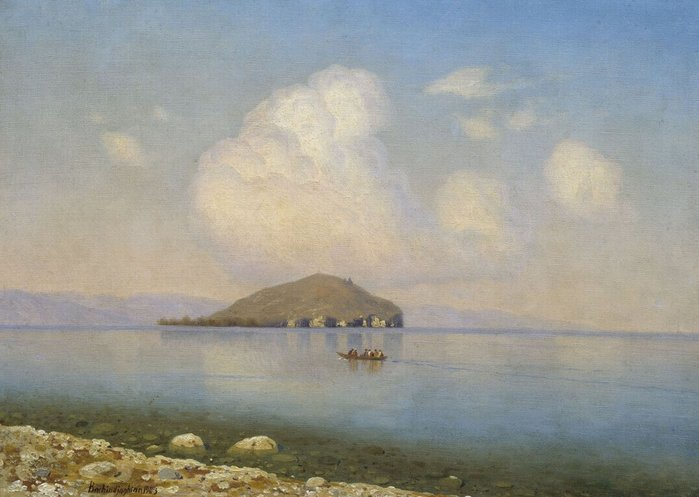
Sunny Day at Lake Sevan
