= Saint Hakob Church of Kanaker =

Church in Yerevan, Armenia

Saint Hakob Church Սուրբ Հակոբ Եկեղեցի
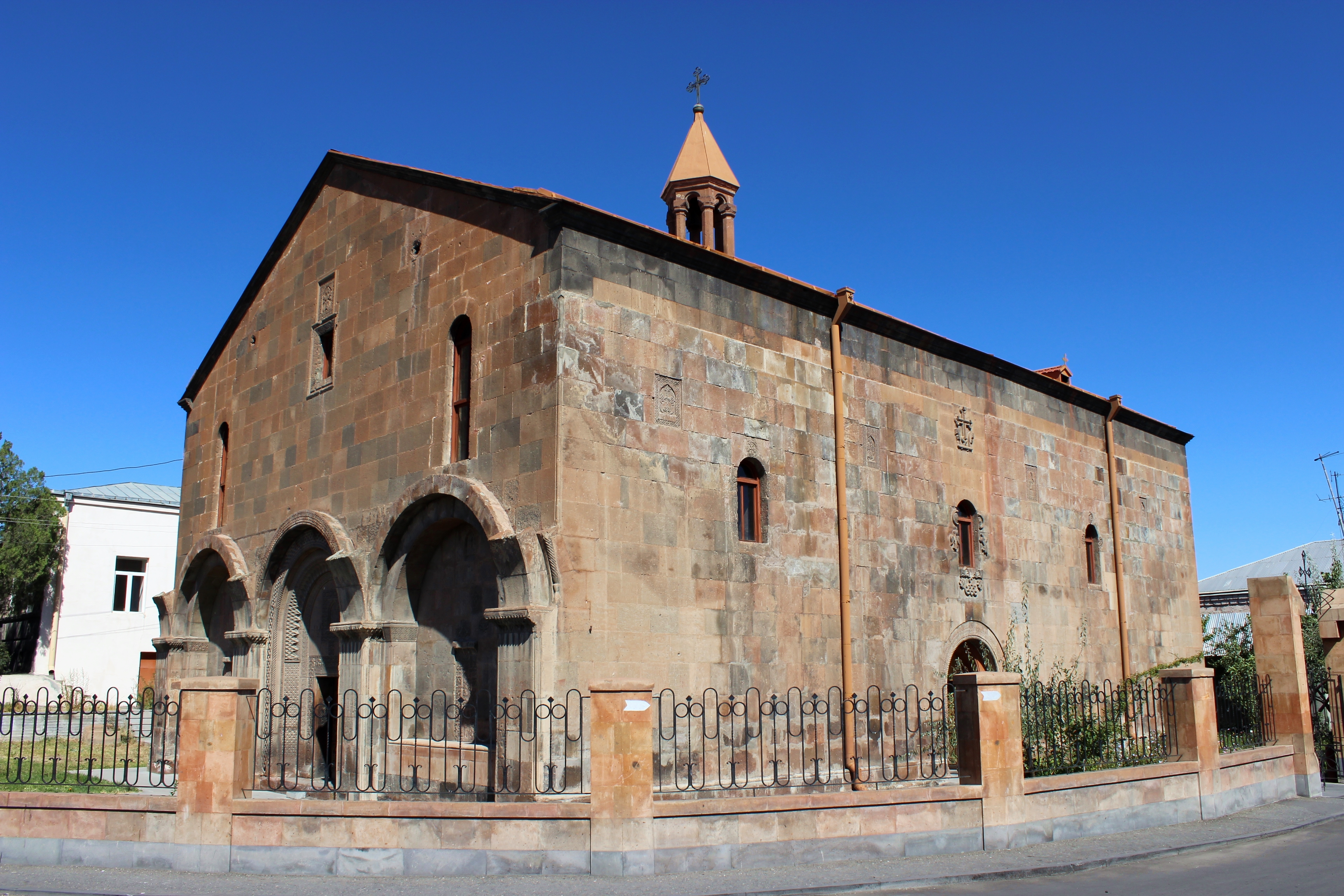
- Saint Hakob Church, September 2014.

- Location within Armenia

Religion
- Affiliation: Armenian Apostolic Church
- District: Kanaker-Zeytun District
- Region: Yerevan
- Ecclesiastical or organisational status: Church
- Status: Active

Location
- Location: 20/1 Kanaker 6th street, Kanaker-Zeytun Yerevan, Armenia
- Territory: Armenia
- Coordinates: 40.220341°N 44.534964°E

Architecture
- Type: Three-nave basilica without dome
- Style: Armenian
- Completed: 1679 (reconstructed)

Surp Hakob Church (Armenian: Սուրբ Հակոբ Եկեղեցի; also, Saint Jacob of Nisibis) is located in the Kanaker-Zeytun District within the city limits of Yerevan, the capital of Armenia. Its sister-church, Surp Astvatsatsin (also, Holy Mother of God Church, built in 1695), is located upon a hilltop to the northwest within sight of the Church of S. Hakob.

== History ==
After the destruction of the original church by the 1679 Yerevan earthquake, S. Hakob was reconstructed through the donations of Hakobjan, a wealthy resident of Tbilisi. While serving as a seat of the bishop in 1868, the churchyard housed the diocesan school named after St. Sahak Partev, under the administration of Mesrop Archimandrite Smbatyants. During the Soviet period, the church was locked and converted into a storehouse. It resumed functioning once again in 1990.

== Architecture ==
The Church of S. Hakob is a three-nave basilica with no dome, but has a single cupola that sits off-center upon the gable roof. There are entrances to the interior at the southern and western walls. An elaborately carved entrance adorns the western façade, where there are khachkars dated 1504, 1571 and 1621 affixed to the wall. The interior of the structure contains a number of murals depicting saints that have been applied to the two pairs of columns and walls. The main altar is located at the eastern interior wall where there are adjacent sacristies.

To the southwest of the church is a gate from 1887 with some decoration that can be seen at the top.

== Gallery ==
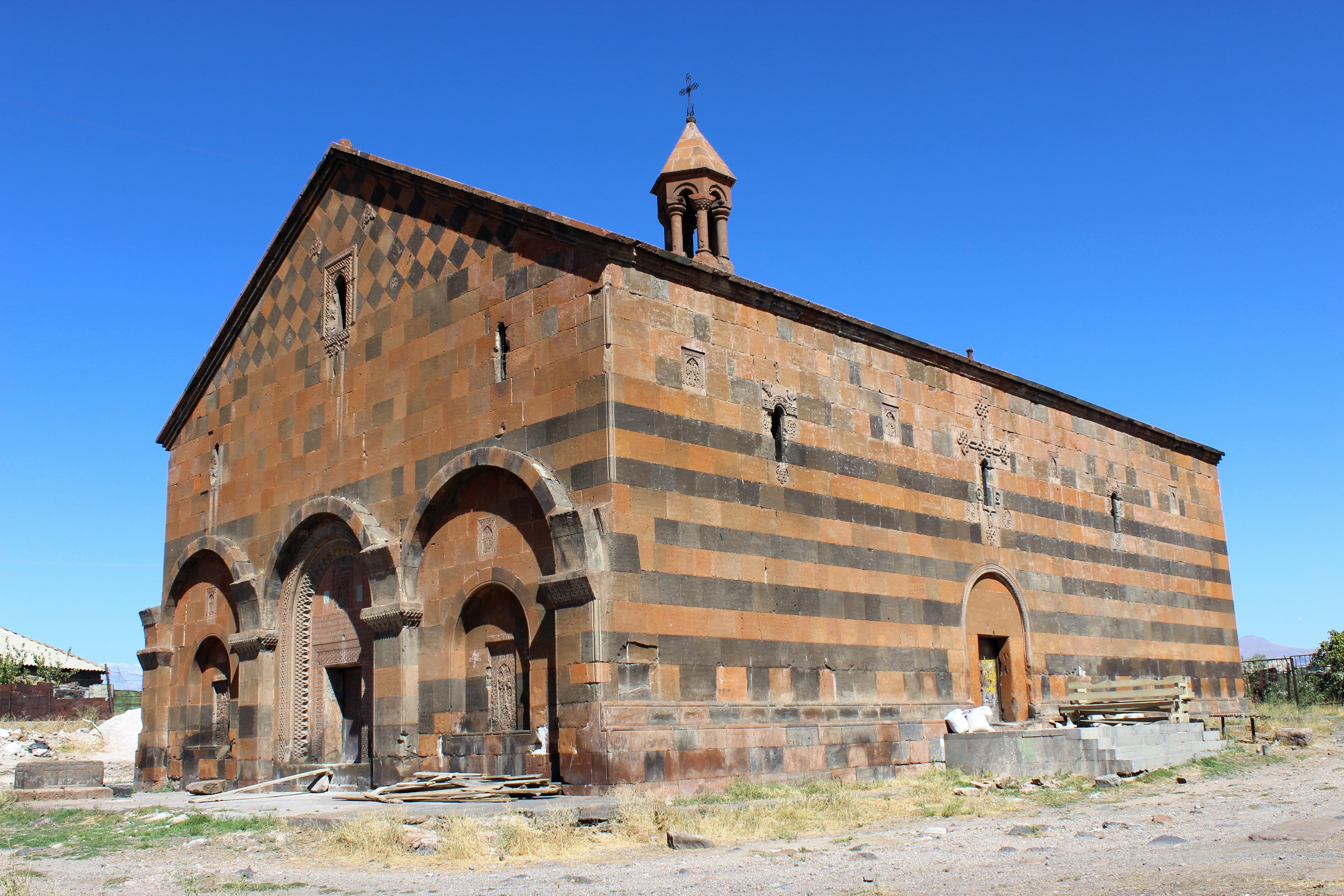
The nearby sister-church, S. Astvatsatsin (Holy Mother of God, 1695)

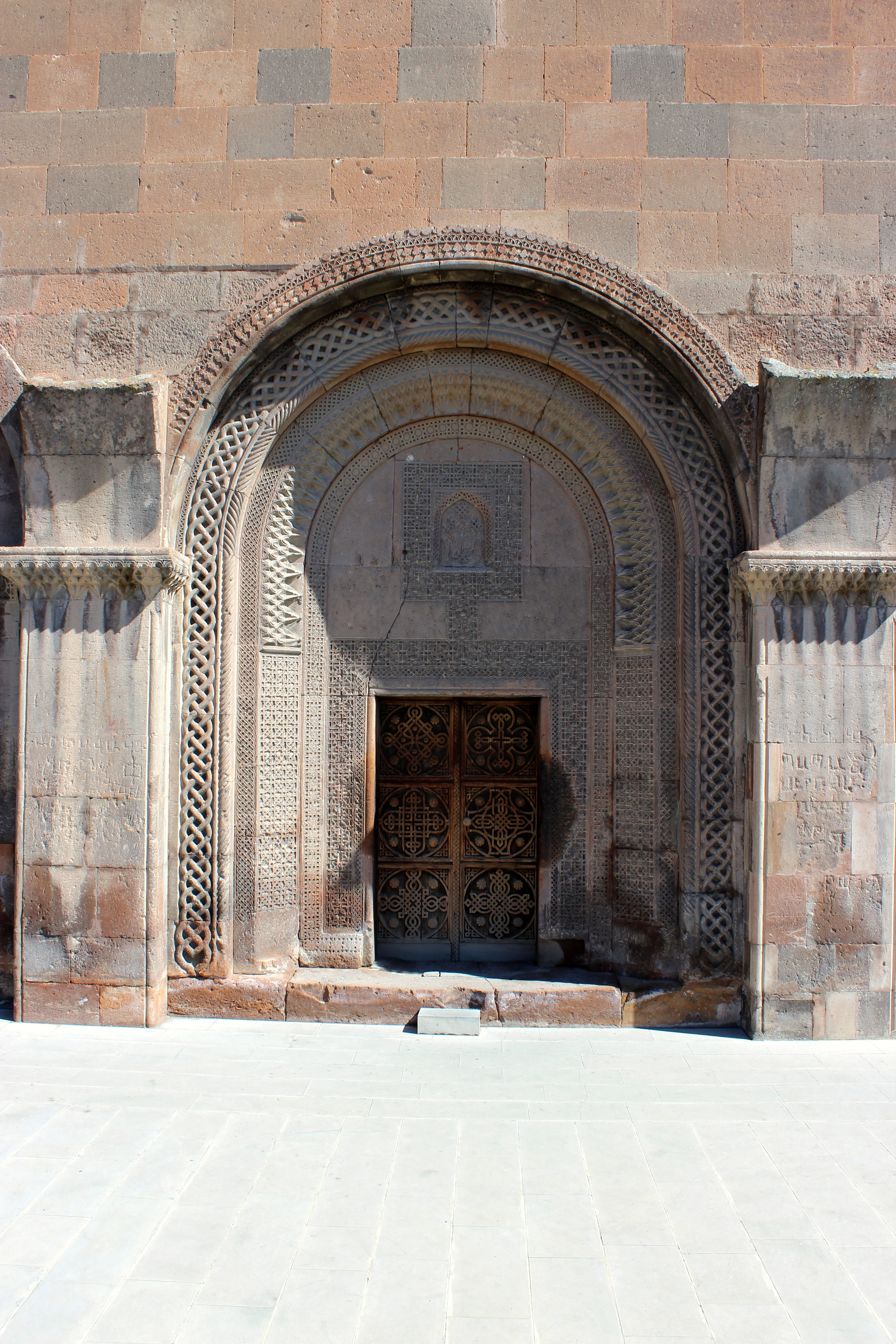
Western portal to the church

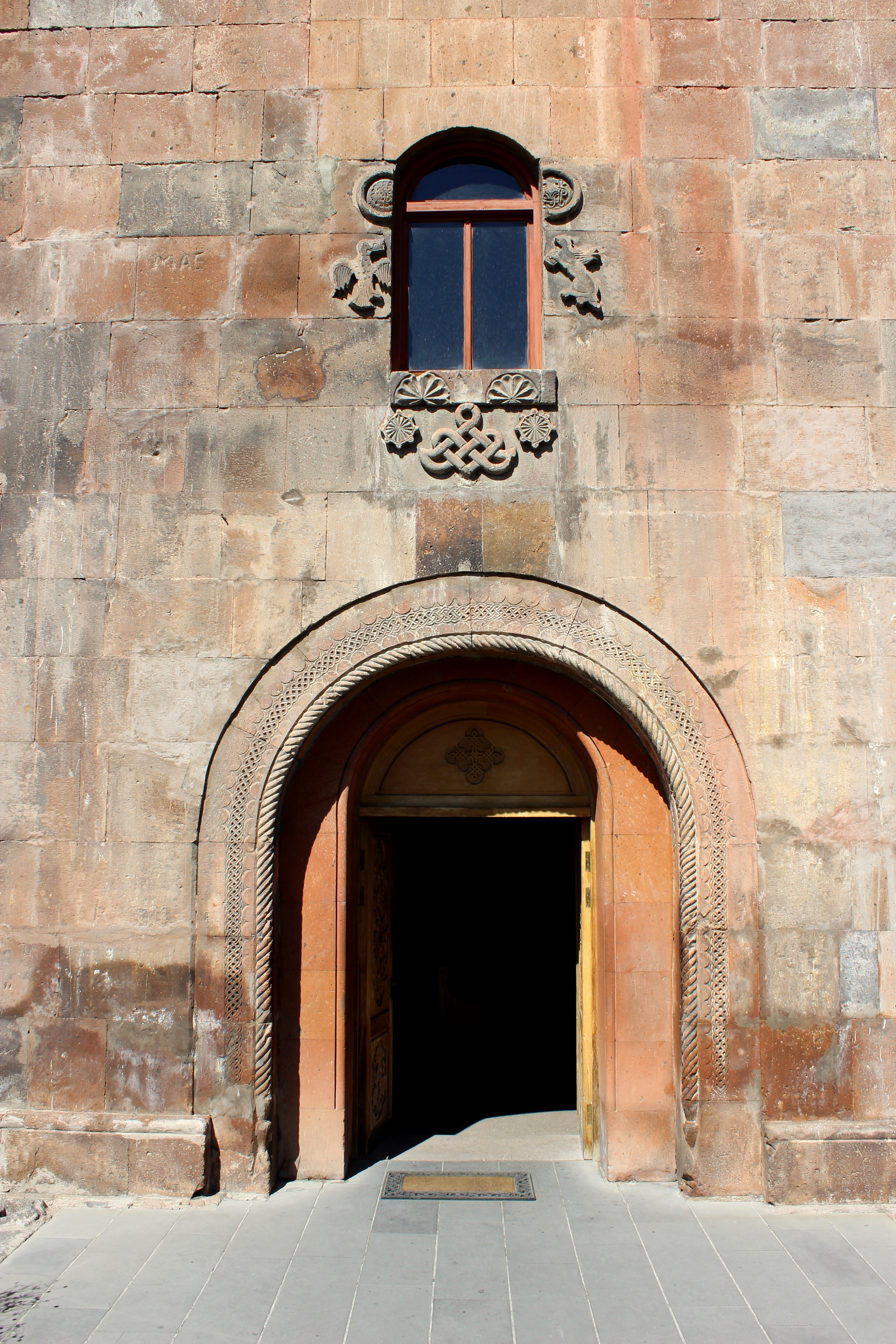
Southern portal to the church

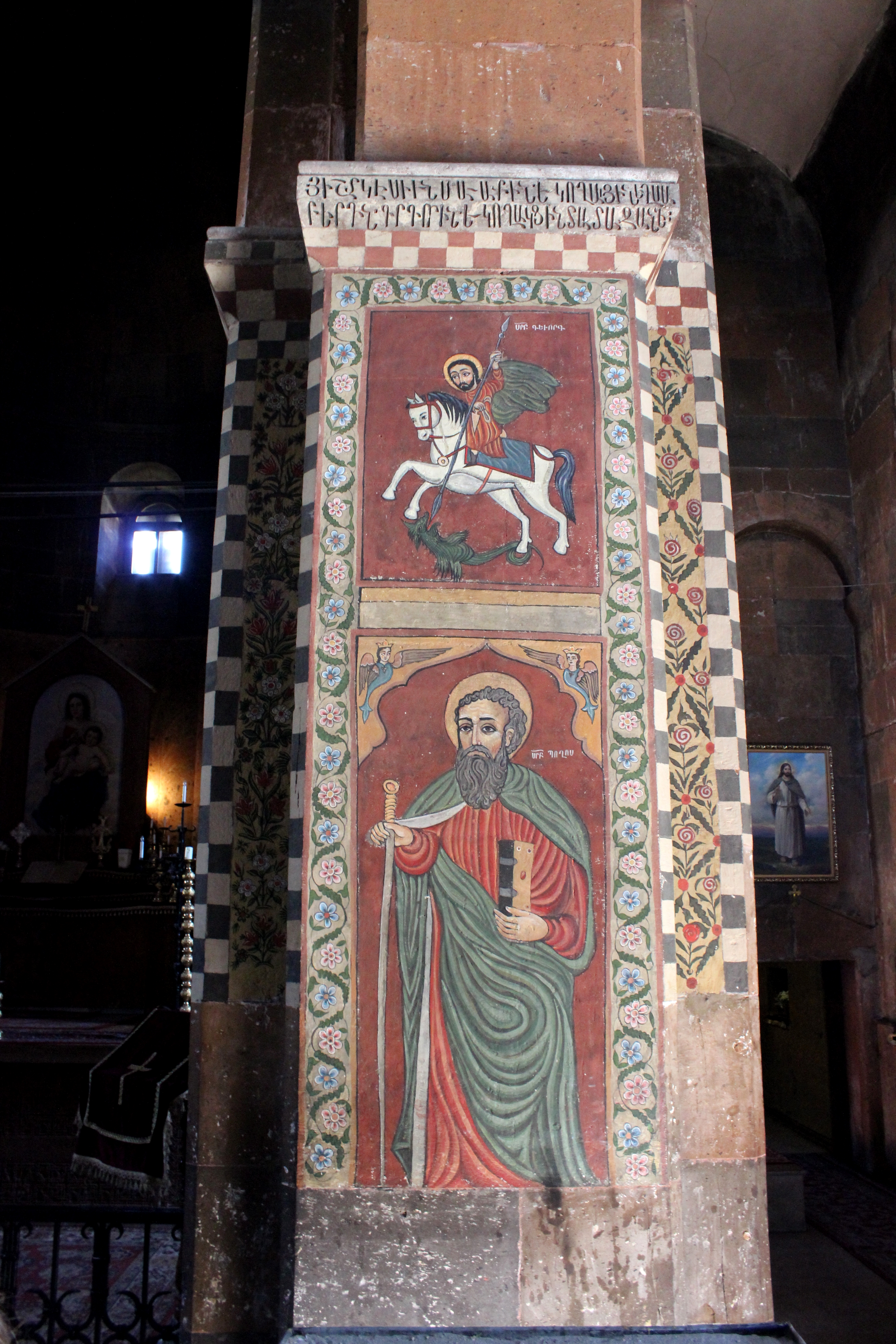
Interior mural depicting Saints George (top) and Paul (bottom)

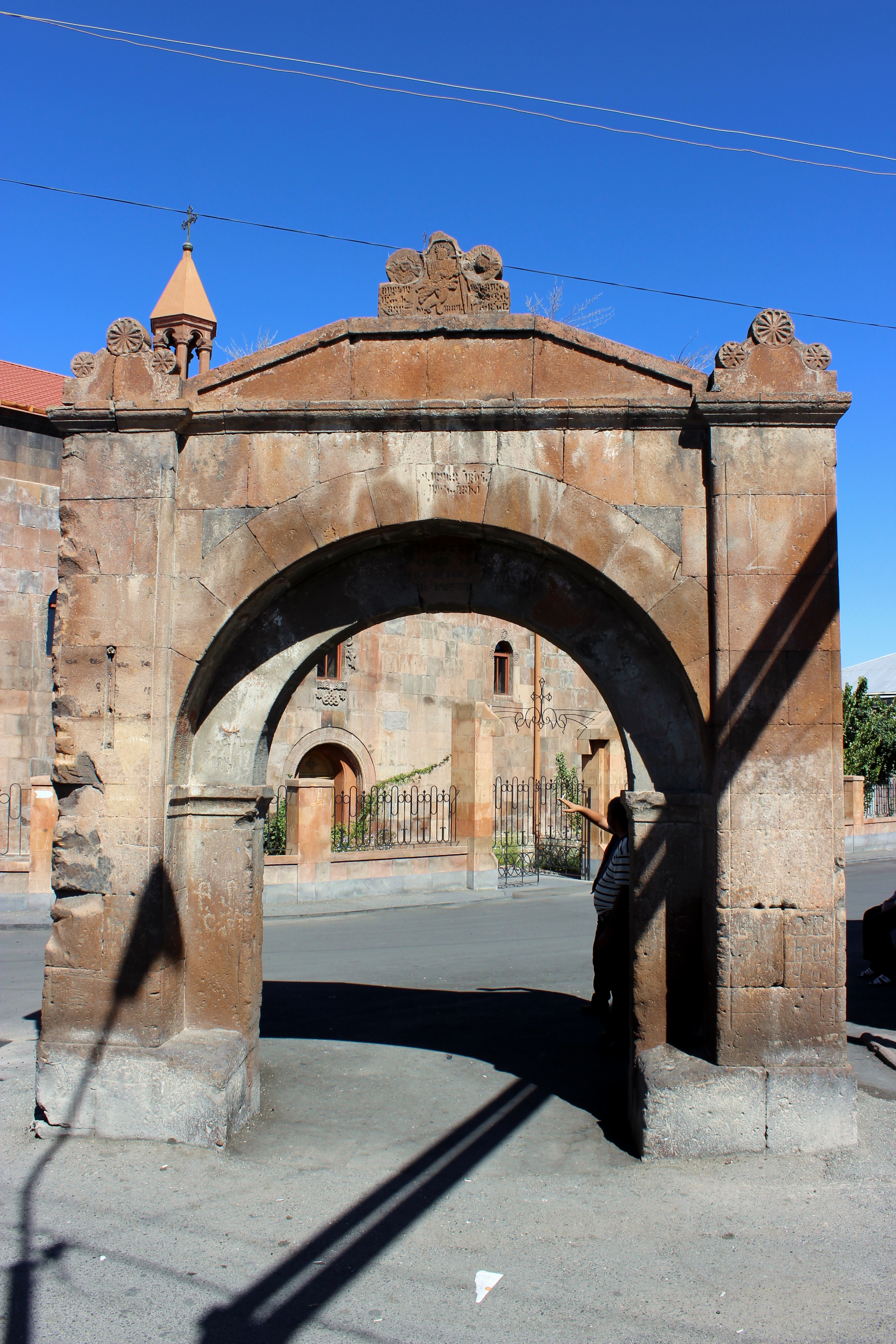
Gate of 1887

== See also ==
- List of churches in Yerevan
