= Journey to Ararat =

2011 film directed by Riho Västrik

- Film poster
- Estonian: Teekond Araratile
- Directed by: Riho Västrik
- Written by: Riho Västrik
- Produced by: Riho Västrik
- Cinematography: Joosep Matjus, Riho Västrik
- Edited by: Enn Säde, Liina Triškina-Vanhatalo
- Music by: Sven Grünberg
- Distributed by: Vesilind
- Release date: December 13, 2011
- Running time: 68 minutes
- Languages: Estonian, Armenian, Russian, Turkish, Kurdish

Journey to Ararat (Estonian: Teekond Araratile) is a 2011 Estonian documentary film directed, written, and produced by Riho Västrik. In the film, Västrik travels to Armenia and Turkey with Estonian scholar Erki Tammiksaar to retrace the footsteps of Baltic German explorer Friedrich Parrot and Armenian writer Khachatur Abovian on their historic ascent of Mount Ararat in 1829. The film derives its name from Parrot's account of his expedition, Journey to Ararat (German: Reise zum Ararat). It was screened at the Golden Apricot International Film Festival in Yerevan in 2013.
