= Wounds of Armenia =

1858 novel by Khachatur Abovian

- Cover of the 1959 edition
- Author: Khachatur Abovian
- Language: Eastern Armenian
- Genre: Historical novel
- Publication date: 1858

Wounds of Armenia (Armenian: Վերք Հայաստանի, romanized: Verk’ Hayastani) (Note: Traditional orthography: Վէրք Հայաստանի) is an 1841 historical novel by Khachatur Abovian. Written in the Araratian (Yerevan) dialect, Wounds of Armenia is considered Abovian's masterpiece. It is Abovian's debut novel, the first Armenian novel (Note: Mesrop Taghiadian published the novels Vep Vardgisi (1846) and Vep Varsenkan (1847) in Classical Armenian prior to the publication of Wounds of Armenia, although Abovian wrote the novel earlier, in 1841.) and the first modern Eastern Armenian literary work. Thanks to Wounds of Armenia, Abovian is acknowledged as the founder of the modern Eastern Armenian language.

It was first published in 1858 in Tiflis, which was the cultural center of Russian Armenians before the Russian Civil War, ten years after Abovian's disappearance.

== Name ==
The book's full title is Wounds of Armenia: Lamentation of a Patriot (Վերք Հայաստանի. ողբ հայրենասիրի).

== Background ==
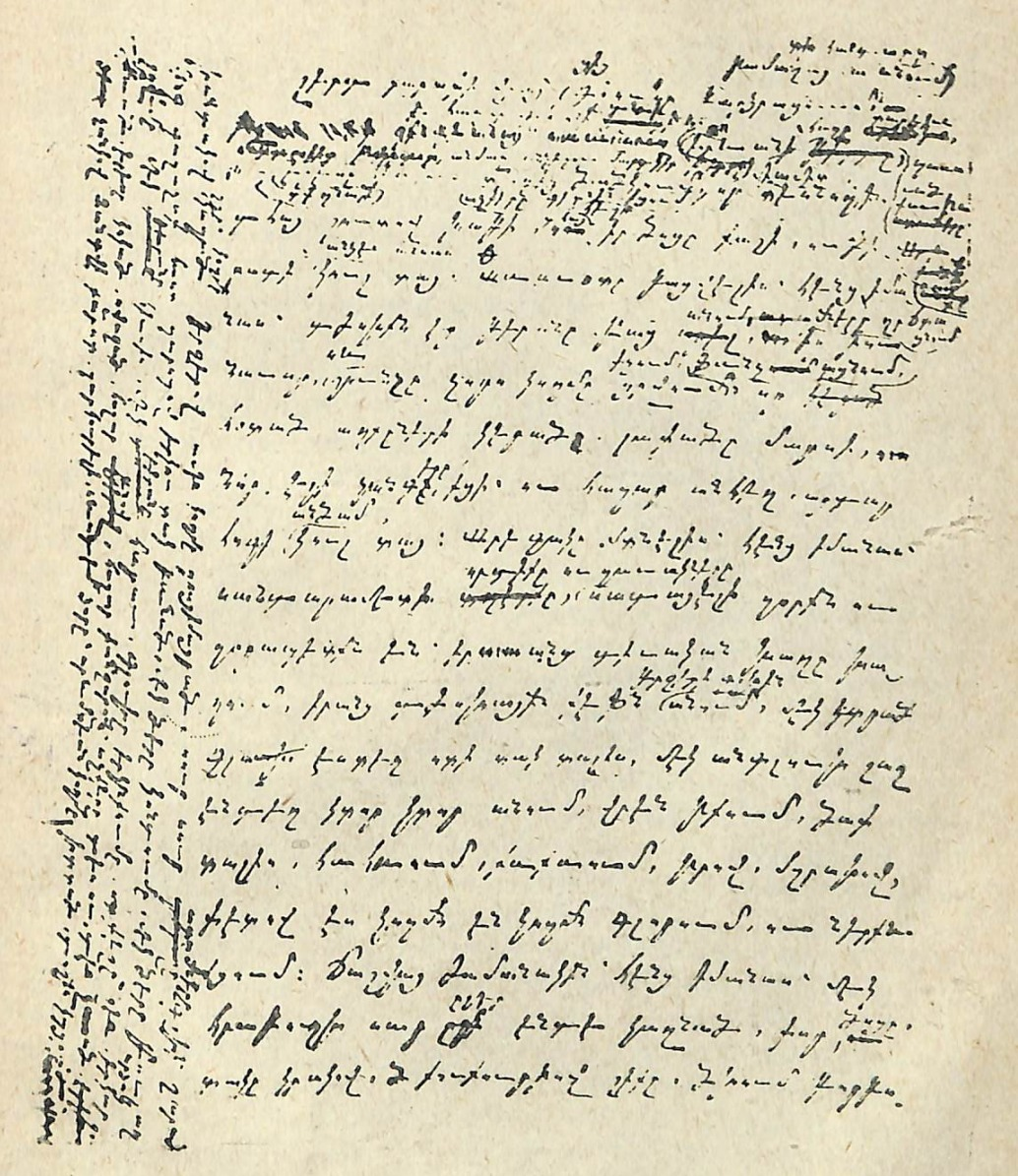
A page from Abovian's manuscript of the novel

Khachatur Abovian was born in Kanaker, a small village near Yerevan in 1809 which was part of Qajar Iran at the time. In 1827, Yerevan was captured by the Russians. From 1830 to 1836, Abovian studied at the Imperial University of Dorpat (nowadays in Tartu, Estonia). Abovian wrote the book in 1841.

== Plot ==
The story which Abovian named Wounds of Armenia is based on an incident which happened in his hometown Kanaker during the Russo-Persian War of 1826–1828.

A young Armenian girl named Taguhi is kidnapped by soldiers of Hossein Khan Sardar, the head of the Erivan Khanate. Aghasi, who is the main hero, kills the Sardar's men and saves her. The Persian governor's brother Hassan decides to punish Aghasi and thus destroys a number of Armenian towns.

== Evaluation ==
The 2005 book The Heritage of Armenian Literature by Agop Jack Hacikyan et al. argues that "though symbolic, the incident [central to the plot], was sufficiently potent to arouse sentiments of patriotism, national pride, and dignity". The authors then note that "the book, reads like a poem, in which the author, like a son, is having an honest, forthright talk with the people, in their own Kanaker dialect". They claim "its message is direct and strong: an appeal from the bottom of the heart".

== Publications and translations ==
The novel was first published in 1858 in Tiflis (modern-day Tbilisi, Georgia). It was later published during the Soviet era (1948, 1959, 1975) and in independent Armenia (2005, 2009). Since now the novel had 16 publications in Armenian in separate books.

The novel was translated for the first time into Russian (by Sergey Shervinsky). In 1948, the Russian translated edition was published in both in Yerevan and Moscow and later republished in 1955, 1971 and 1977 in Yerevan. In 1978 and 2005 it was published in Moscow.

In 2005, Vahé Baladouni translated the preface of Abovian's novel into English. It was published in Yerevan by the Museum of Literature and Art. (ISBN 9993060607, OCLC 76872486)

The novel has also been published in Latvian (1960), Lithuanian (1980) and Romanian (2015).

== See also ==
- Modern Armenian
- Classical Armenian
- Yerevan dialect
