= Riho Västrik =

Estonian filmmaker, producer, screenwriter, journalist, and historian

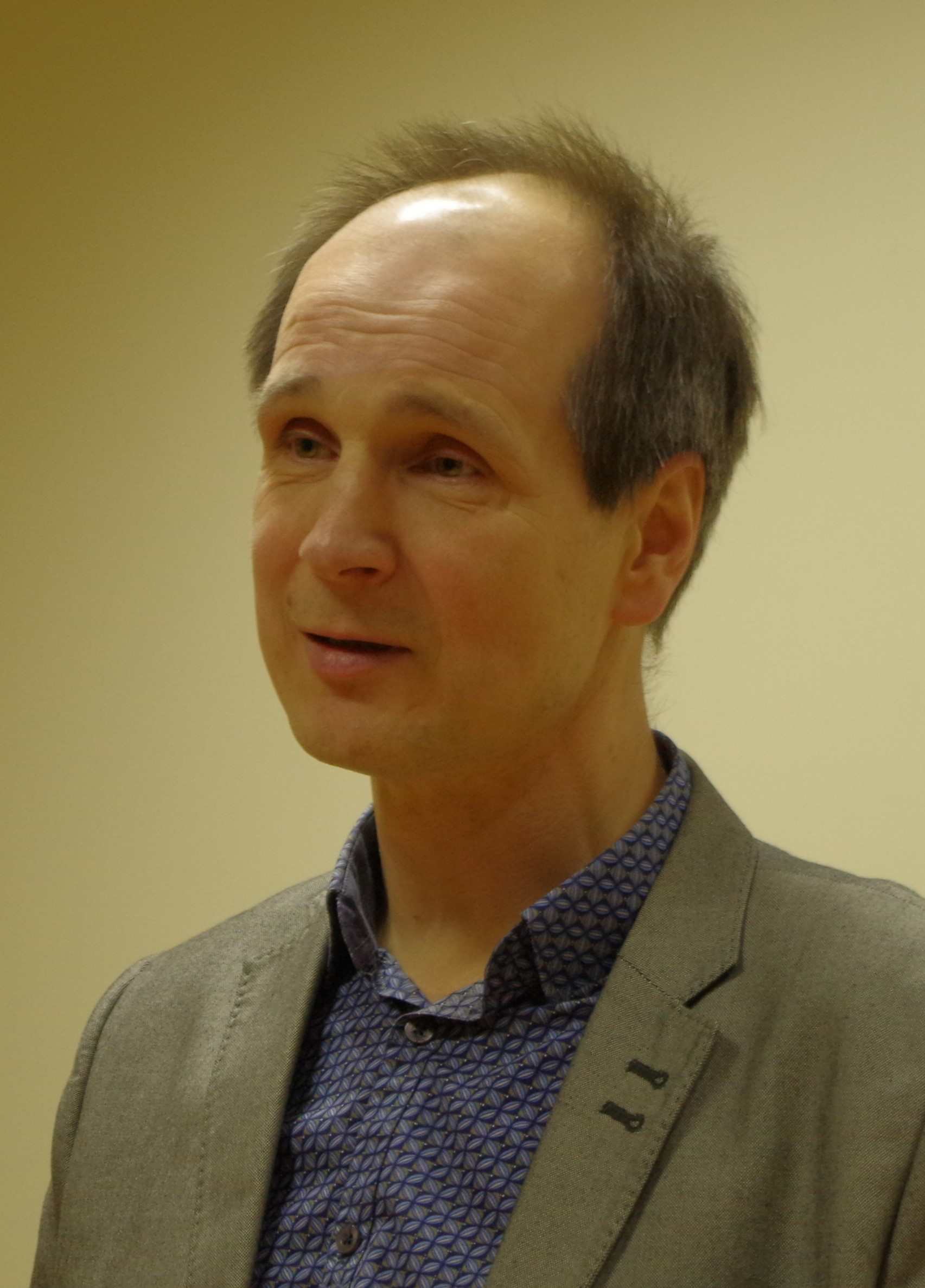
- Riho Västrik, February 2016
- Born: August 4, 1965 (age 61); Abja-Paluoja, then part of Estonian SSR, Soviet Union
- Education: University of Tartu
- Occupations: Filmmaker, producer
- Years active: 1987–present
- Website: http://vesilind.ee/

Riho Västrik (born August 4, 1965) is an Estonian filmmaker, producer, screenwriter, journalist, and historian.

== Biography ==
Between 1988 and 2000, Västrik studied at the University of Tartu, where he received his bachelor's degree in history and journalism. He earned his master's degree in Film Arts at the Baltic Film and Media School in Tallinn, where he has worked as an associate professor in film since 2009. From 1987 to 1990, Västrik was an actor in Tallinn's VAT Theater and, from 1990 to 1993, he worked on the editorial board of Estonian Radio. He was the chief editor of the news department for the Estonian television network RTV from 1993 to 1995. From 1997 to 2001, he worked as a news broadcaster for Eesti Televisioon. In 1996, he founded the Vesilind production company in Tallinn and has served as its managing director ever since.

Västrik's documentary films focus on exploration in post-Soviet Eurasia, particularly in Siberia, the Far North, and Central Asia. He has collaborated with Russian, Latvian, Lithuanian, Finnish, and German filmmakers. His collaborations with Russian filmmaker and scientist Vasily Sarana began with his work on Alexander von Middendorff's explorations of the Taymyr Peninsula and have won many awards. Produced by Västrik, Sarana's film The Return of the Musk Ox won the Laurel Branch National Award for the Best Popular Science Film in Russia in 2008.

In 1998, Västrik participated in the first Estonian expedition to the Himalayas. In 2011, he participated in the reburial of Hermann Walter, a member of Eduard Toll's Arctic expedition team, on Kotelny Island in the Laptev Sea. That same year, Västrik directed the documentary film Journey to Ararat on Friedrich Parrot and Khachatur Abovian's 1829 expedition to Mount Ararat. It was screened at the Golden Apricot International Film Festival in the Armenian capital Yerevan in 2013.

== Filmography ==
=== Director and Producer ===
- Forty Years Later (1998)
- Estonians on the Summit of America (1998)
- Cho-Oyu (1998)
- Snow Leopard (1999)
- Lenin - Man and Mountain (2001)
- The Warlord (2004)
- In the Footsteps of Middendorff (2006)
- The Otepää Gonne (2008)
- Saint George (2009)
- The Lake and the City (2010)
- The Life of a Coastal Fisherman (2011)
- Journey to Ararat (2011)
- Man with the Top Hat (2012)
- The Burden of a Fire (2013)
- Landscape Patterns (2014)
- Bonus Track (2016)

=== Producer ===
- Master Hunter: Portrait of Mati Hõbemägi (2004)
- Songs of Coastal Meadows (2005)
- Last Man Standing (2005)
- Karula National Park (2005)
- Time (2008)
- The Return of the Musk Ox (2008)
- Summer of a Newspaper Kid (2008)
- How to Dance with Bears (2008)
- Amateurs (2008)
- Unlucky Talisman (2009)
- The Drum (2009)
- Old Man and the Moose (2009)
- Journey to the Source of the Lena (2010)
- Delta (2011)
- The Pigeons (2012)
- Tallinn City Symphony (2012)
- Estonian Nature: Alam-Pedja (2013)
- The House Guard (2015)
- Life on the Mother River (2015)
- Woman and the Glacier (2016)
- Come Back Free (2016)
- A Fragile World (2016)
