= Modern Armenian =

Modern vernacular form of the Armenian language

Modern Armenian (Armenian: աշխարհաբար, ashkharhabar or ašxarhabar, literally the "secular/lay language") is the modern vernacular (vulgar) form of the Armenian language. Although it first appeared in the 14th century, it was not until the 18-19th centuries that it became the dominant form of written Armenian, as opposed to Classical Armenian (grabar or the "language of the book"). It has two standardized forms: Western Armenian and Eastern Armenian, mostly spoken—in the 19th century—in the Ottoman and Russian empires, respectively.

The first novel written in Modern Armenian is Khachatur Abovian's Wounds of Armenia, first published posthumously in 1858. Besides Abovian, other prominent advocates of the use of Modern Armenian were Mikayel Nalbandian and Raphael Patkanian. Pataknian's father, Gabriel, published Ararat, the first Modern Armenian periodical in the Russian-controlled Caucasus.
