= Khachatur Abovian =

Armenian polymath and writer (1809–1848?)

- Խաչատուր Աբովյան
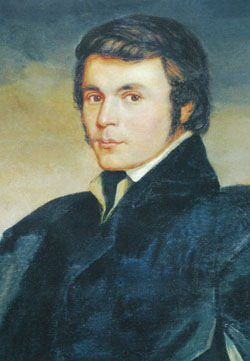
- Portrait by Ludwig von Maydell (1831)
- Born: 15 October 1809; Kanaker, Erivan Khanate, Qajar Iran (modern-day Yerevan, Armenia)
- Disappeared: 14 April 1848 (aged 38)
- Occupations: novelist, playwright, teacher, poet, philosopher
- Spouse: Emilia Looze (m. 1839)
- Children: 2
- Writing career
- Citizenship: Russian Empire
- Education: Imperial University of Dorpat
- Language: Armenian
- Period: Romanticism
- Notable work: Wounds of Armenia

Khachatur Abovian (Armenian: Խաչատուր Աբովյան, romanized: Khach’atur Abovyan; 15 October [O.S. 3 October] 1809 – disappeared 14 April [O.S. 2 April] 1848) was an Armenian polymath, educator, scientist, philosopher, writer, poet and an advocate of modernization. He mysteriously vanished in 1848 and was eventually presumed dead. Reputed as the father of modern Armenian literature, he is best remembered for his novel Wounds of Armenia. Written in 1841 and published posthumously in 1858, it was the first novel published in the Modern Armenian language, based on the Yerevan dialect instead of Classical Armenian.

Abovian was far ahead of his time and virtually none of his works were published during his lifetime. Only after the establishment of the Armenian SSR was Abovian accorded recognition and stature. Abovian is regarded as one of the foremost figures not just in Armenian literature, but Armenian history at large. Abovian's influence on Western Armenian literature was not as strong as it was on Eastern Armenian, particularly in its formative years.

== Early life and career ==
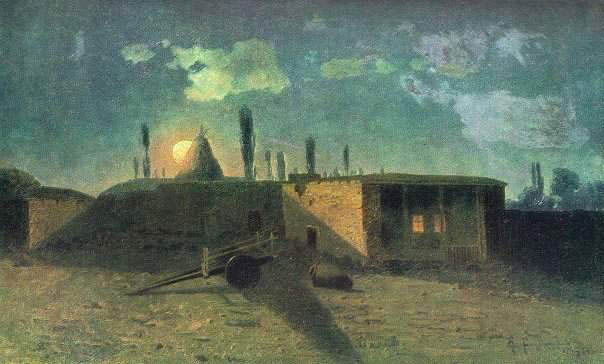
Painting in 1884 by Gevorg Bashinjaghian of the house where Abovian was born

Abovian was born in 1809 in the village of Kanaker, then part of Qajar Iran, and now a district of Yerevan, Armenia. Abovian's family were descendants of the Beglaryan melik family in Gulistan, one of five Armenian families who ruled around the current-day region of Nagorno-Karabakh. The Abovian family held the position of tanuter (a hereditary lordship) in Kanaker; Abovian's uncle was the last tanuter of Kanaker. His aunt was the wife of Sahak Aghamalian, the last melik of Yerevan at the time of the Russian annexation in 1828. His social origins and descent imbued him at an early age with a sense of responsibility to his people. He was born six years after his parents, Avetik and Takuhi, married. He had a brother, Karapet, who died at the age of three.

At age 10, Abovian was taken by his father to Echmiadzin to study for the priesthood. He dropped out after five years and moved to Tiflis in 1822 to study Armenian studies and languages at the Nersisyan School under the guidance of Harutiun Alamdarian. Abovian graduated in 1826 and began preparing to move to Venice to further his education. However, the outbreak of the Russo-Persian War (1826–28) curtailed his plans. For the following three years he taught briefly at Sanahin and then worked for Catholicos Yeprem of Armenia as his clerk and translator. While working for the Catholicos, the twenty-year-old Abovian met many notable foreigners, including the diplomat and playwright Alexander Griboyedov, who was stuck in Echmiadzin en route to Tabriz in September 1828. Griboyedov's weekly Tifliskiye Vedemosti became the first paper to publish an article on Abovian.

== Conquest of Ararat ==
The turning point in Abovian's life was the arrival of Friedrich Parrot in Armenia in September 1829, a professor of physics from the Imperial University of Dorpat in Livonia (in present-day Tartu, Estonia). Parrot traveled to Armenia to climb Mount Ararat to conduct geological studies and required a local guide and a translator for the expedition. The Catholicos assigned Abovian to these tasks. With Abovian's assistance, Parrot became the first explorer in modern times to reach the summit of Mount Ararat. The project received full approval from the emperor Nicholas I, who provided the expedition with a military escort.

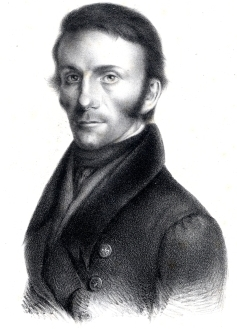
Abovian's mentor Friedrich Parrot

Abovian and Parrot crossed the Arax River into the district of Surmalu and headed to the Armenian village of Akhuri situated on the northern slope of Ararat 4,000 feet (1,200 m) above sea level. Following the advice of Harutiun Alamdarian of Tiflis, they set up base camp at the Monastery of St. Hakob some 2,400 feet (730 m) higher, at an elevation of 6,375 feet (1,943 m). Abovian was one of the last travelers to visit Akhuri and the monastery before a disastrous earthquake completely buried both in May 1840. Their first attempt to climb the mountain, using the northeast slope, failed as a result of lack of warm clothing.

Six days later, on the advice of Stepan Khojiants, the village chief of Akhuri, the ascent was attempted from the northwest side. After reaching an elevation of 16,028 feet (4,885 m), they turned back because they did not reach the summit before sundown. They reached the summit on their third attempt at 3:15 p.m. on 9 October 1829. Abovian dug a hole in the ice and erected a wooden cross facing north. Abovian picked up a chunk of ice from the summit and carried it down with him in a bottle, considering the water holy. On 8 November, Parrot and Abovian climbed up Lesser Ararat. Years later, in 1845, the German mineralogist Otto Wilhelm Hermann von Abich climbed Ararat with Abovian. Abovian's third and last ascent of Ararat was with the Englishman Henry Danby Seymour in 1846.

== The Dorpat years ==
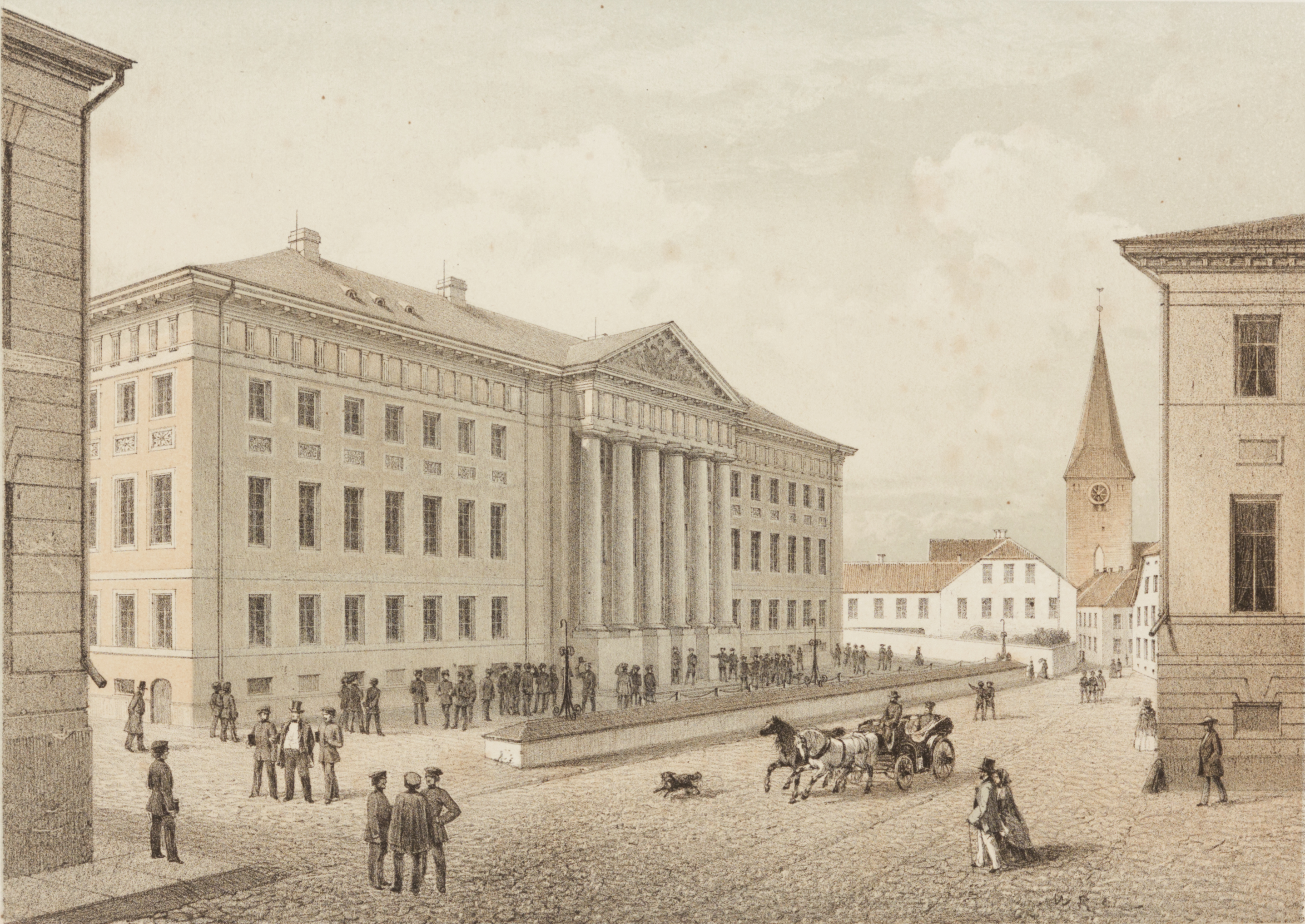
Imperial University of Dorpat in the mid-19th century

Impressed with Abovian's thirst for knowledge, Parrot arranged for a Russian state scholarship for Abovian to study at the Imperial University of Dorpat in 1830. He entered the university directly without additional preparation and studied in the Faculty of Philosophy of the Philological-Historical Department from 3 September 1830 to 18 January 1836. The years in Dorpat (present-day Tartu, Estonia) were very fruitful for Abovian who studied social and natural sciences, European literature and philosophy, and mastered German, Russian, French and Latin. At this time Abovian fell under the influence of German Romanticism. In addition, Abovian established numerous contacts with European intellectuals of the time. At the university he became friends with the sons of Nikolay Karamzin who studied with him. In 1834 Abovian visited his cousin Maria (daughter of melik Sahak Aghamalian) in Saint Petersburg, who then married to the Georgian prince Alexander. Prior to graduation, Abovian learned that his mother Takuhi had died.

== Return to Armenia ==
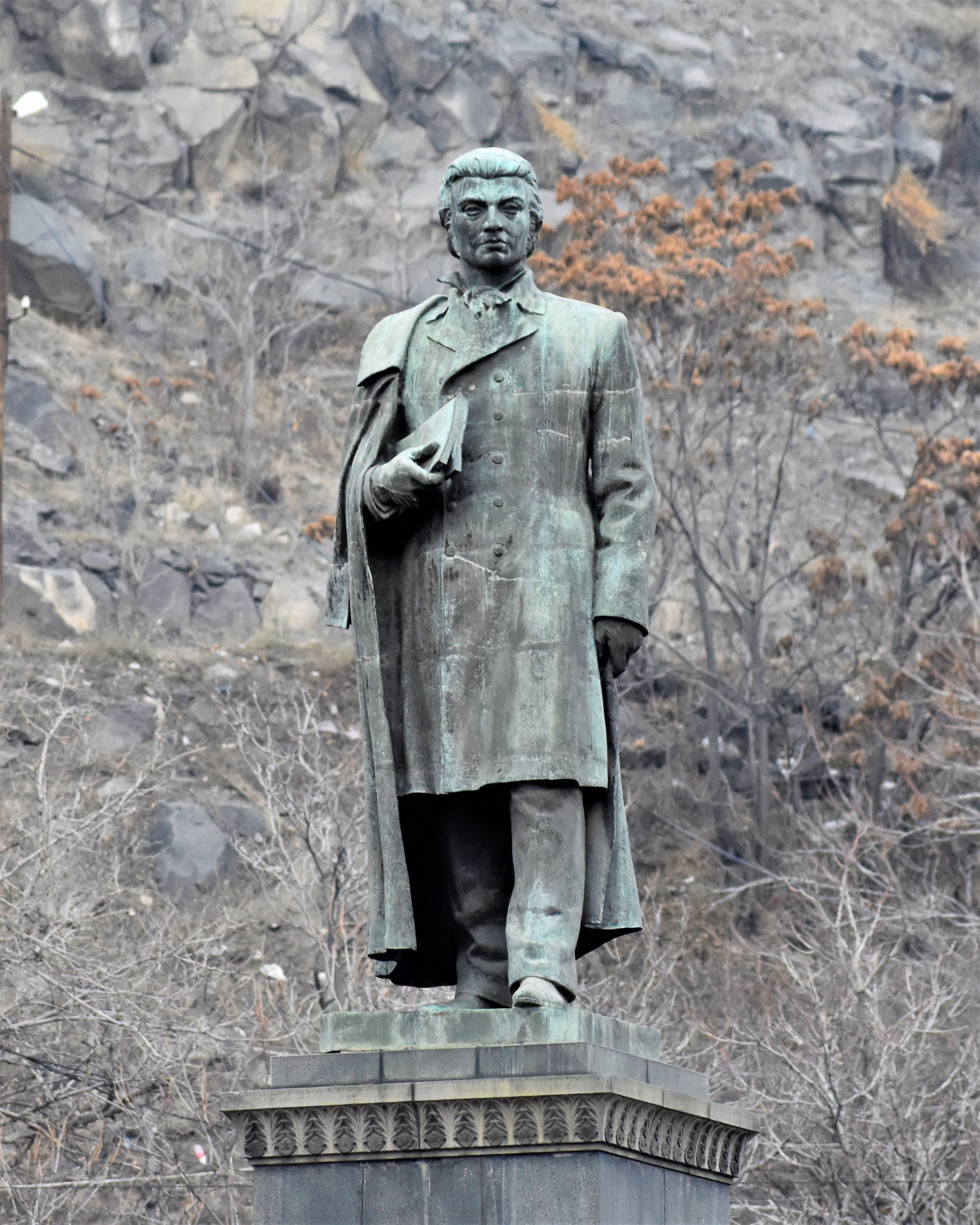
Abovian's 1950 statue in Yerevan

In 1836 he returned home anxious to embark on a mission of enlightenment. Abovian's efforts were thwarted as he faced a growing and hostile reaction from the Armenian clergy as well as Tsarist officials, largely stemming from his opposition to dogmatism and formalism in the school system. Abovian was appointed as the supervisor of the Tiflis uyezd school and married a German woman named Emilia Looze (died 1870) in 1839. In 1840 he was approached by English traveller Anne Lister, who was visiting Tiflis with her partner Ann Walker. She hoped that Abovian would guide her on another expedition to Mount Ararat which ultimately did not occur. He was dismissed from the school in 1843 and was transferred to the subdivisional uyezd school in Yerevan where he encountered apathy and antagonism from his colleagues and the clergy.

In the summer of the same year, Abovian was visited by two German travellers. A Bavarian professor, Moritz Wagner, from the Ludwig-Maximilians-Universität München, arrived in May and toured the Lake Sevan region with Abovian and thereafter corresponded with him on a regular basis. In July Abovian also accompanied Wagner on the first recorded ascent of Mount Aragats in Armenia.

In August, Abovian escorted the German Baron August von Haxthausen around the province. They visited the Abovian family home in Kanaker and attended a service at the Blue Mosque. They also visited a Yazidi encampment where they met the chief Timur Aga and exchanged pleasantries with a rider from Count Paskevich's guard. He became a trusted friend of the Yazidi community in Armenia, and when the chief returned with lavish gifts from a banquet in Tiflis organised by the viceroy of the Caucasus Mikhail Semyonovich Vorontsov in 1844, he organised a tribal feast and Abovian was invited to attend. In 1845 he applied for a position at the Catholicate of Echmiadzin but was not accepted. The following year, he became a contributor to Vorontsov's weekly newspaper, Kavkaz, for which Abovian wrote three articles.

== Disappearance ==
On 14 April 1848, Abovian left his home for an early morning walk, and was never seen again; his disappearance remains unresolved. His wife Emilia did not report him missing for a month. Their children, Vardan (1840–1896) and Zarmandukht (later known as Adelaide; 1843–1909), were ages eight and five, respectively, at the time of the disappearance.

Numerous theories have been proposed attempting to explain his disappearance: that he committed suicide, was murdered by his Persian or Turkish enemies, or arrested and exiled to Siberia by the Special Corps of Gendarmes, among others. Given his love for his children and their young age, the theory that Abovian committed suicide is generally disregarded. Writer Axel Bakunts put forward the theory that Abovian was in Western Europe engulfed in the Revolutions of 1848.

== Writings ==
Abovian wrote novels, stories, descriptions, plays, scientific and artistic compositions, verses and fables. He was the first Armenian writer to compose literature for children.

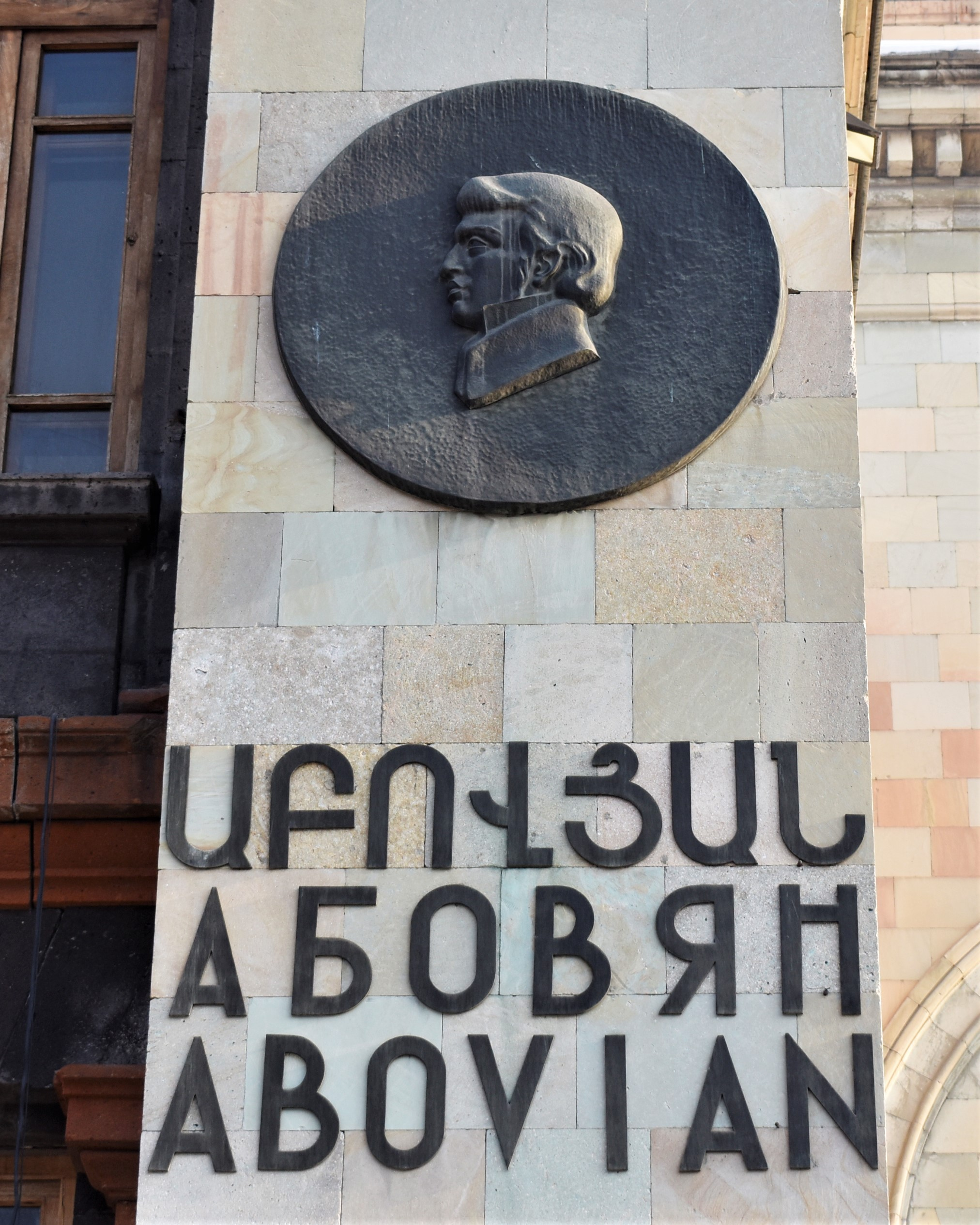
A plaque of Abovian near Yerevan's Republic Square, on Abovyan Street

=== Wounds of Armenia ===
The historical novel Wounds of Armenia (written in 1841, first published in 1858) was the first Armenian secular novel dedicated to the fate of the Armenian people and its struggle for liberation in the period of Russo-Persian war of 1826–1828. The novel dealt with the suffering of Armenians under Persian occupation. The basic concept of the novel was the assertion of feelings of national merit, patriotism and hatred of oppressors. These themes had a profound influence over wide layers of Armenian society. The hero, Aghasi, personifies the freedom-loving national spirit and its will to fight against the foreign conquerors. "Give away your life, but never give away your native lands" is his motto. The story begins with an abduction of an Armenian girl by a band of thugs sent by the Persian sardar that triggers an uprising led by Aghasi.

Abovian saw in strengthening of the friendship of Russian and Armenian peoples a guarantee of the national, political and cultural revival of his native lands. However, when Abovian wrote the novel he was already disillusioned with Tsarist policies in Armenia, particularly with the implementation of Polozhenie (Statute) in 1836 which greatly reduced the political power of the Armenian Catholicos and the abolishment of the Armenian Oblast in 1840. In the novel, elements of romanticism and realism are interlaced while the narration is supplanted by lyrical retreats.

=== Other works ===
Abovian's poetry was filled with satire best expressed in The Wine Jug, in which he criticised Russian bureaucracy. Leisure Entertainment was adapted by Abovian from notes he took in public gatherings. The work is a collection of fables in verse that chastise vice, injustice and moral degeneration. He wrote scientific and artistic non-fiction works such as the Discovery of America and Book of Stories. Abovian translated to the Armenian language the works of Homer, Goethe, Friedrich Schiller, Nikolay Karamzin, I. A. Krylov and others. He continued promoting secular and comprehensive (mental, moral, working, physical) training, school accessibility, free education for the indigent and equal education of boys and girls. Pedagogical compositions of Abovian include the book for reading Introduction to Education (1838), a textbook of Russian grammar and an Armenian-language novel History of Tigran, or a Moral Manual for Armenian Children (printed in 1941). He was the first Armenian to study scientific ethnography: the way of life and customs of the peasants of the native settlements around Kanaker, inhabitants of Yerevan, and gathered and studied Armenian and Kurdish folklore.

== Legacy ==
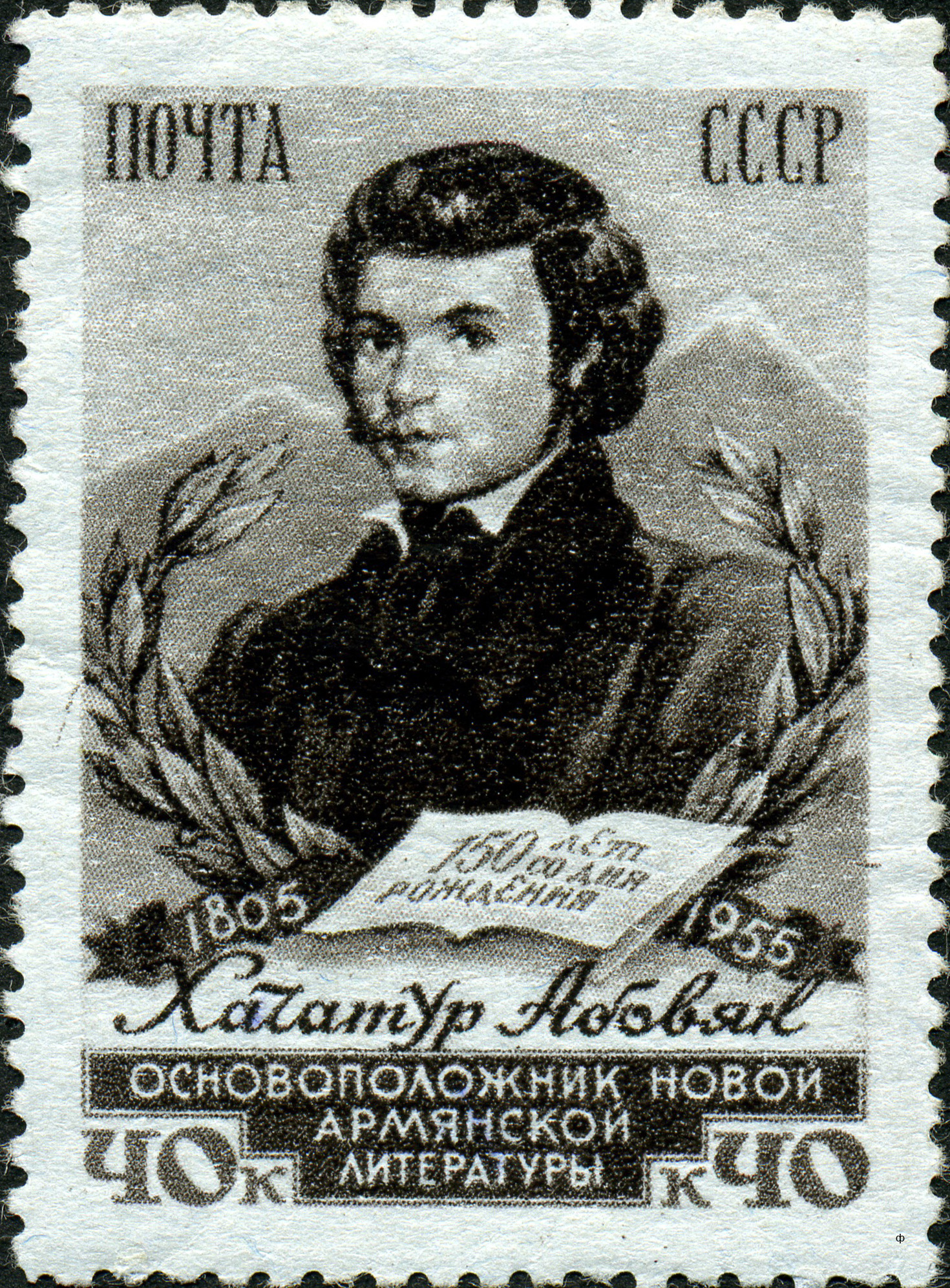
Khachatur Abovian on a 1956 Soviet stamp

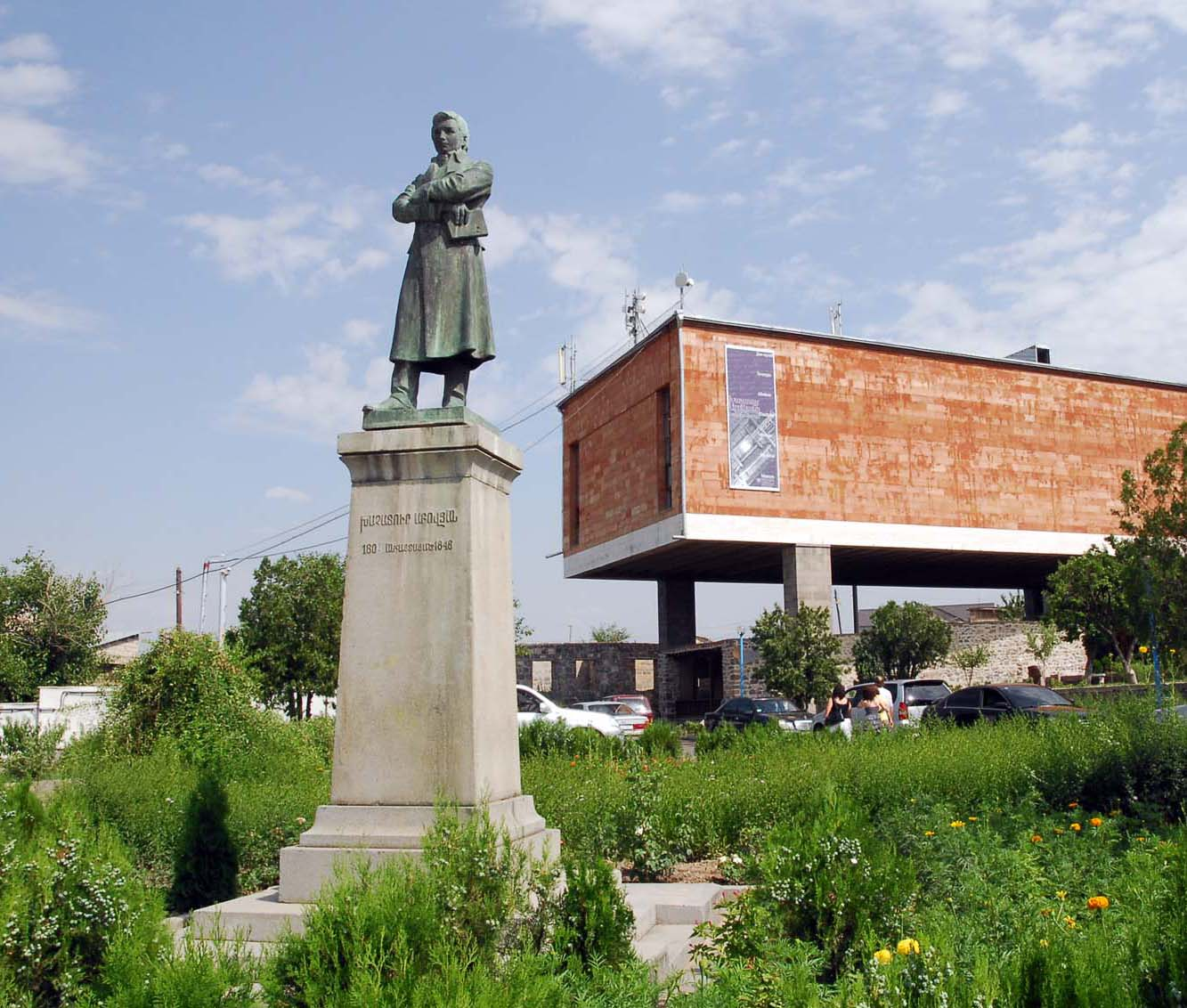
Abovian's statue near his childhood home in his native village of Kanaker, nowadays part of the capital Yerevan

Abovian's life is well remembered in Armenia. During the era of Soviet Armenia, his pro-Russia stance was emphasized. Kevork Bardakjian argues that, while there is much reason for the praise of Abovian, his veneration was carried to extremes, especially during the Soviet years, leaving many worthy contemporaries in the shadow of the chosen 'fathers' or 'masters.' Abovian's work had little influence on Western Armenian literature, particularly in its formative years. Bardakjian also suggests that the extent of the influence of Abovian's work, much of which was published decades after his death, is still open to debate. Bardakjian writes that Abovian cannot be regarded as the father of modern Armenian literature, but that he merits recognition as the founder of modern Eastern Armenian literature for his novel Wounds of Armenia.

Abovian was influenced by the progressive pedagogical views of Jean-Jacques Rousseau and Johann Heinrich Pestalozzi. Ara Baliozian wrote:

[Abovian] believed that every person, even the lowest, has inherent powers capable of development. These liberal views, together with his persistent efforts to reform the education system, alienated him from the Armenian establishment—the clergy and the wealthy merchants: an alliance that has always been on the side of reaction rather than progress. As a result, he may have committed suicide, or, as a thinker impossible to muzzle, he may have been secretly assassinated by agents of the Czar.

During the Soviet era, several schools, streets, boulevards and parks were named after the writer. The village of Elar, located 10 kilometres (6.2 mi) northeast of Yerevan, was named after him on October 12, 1961. The decision followed an earlier suggestion to rename the community made by Anastas Mikoyan during his 1954 visit to Armenia. As the village's population grew, Abovyan was formally accorded city status in 1963. Abovian's home in Kanaker was turned into a house-museum in 1939, and many of his original writings are preserved there. The work that the writer accomplished in the field of education was honored. Yerevan's State Pedagogical Institute was named after him. On 28 February 1964, a medal was named in his honour (Abovyani anvan medal) which was awarded to schoolteachers who showed exceptional abilities in teaching and education.

=== Portrait ===
Abovian's portrait is one of the most exceptional exhibits of the Museum of Literature and Arts after Charents. It is an oil painting with a size of 20.5 centimetres (8.1 in) by 27.5 centimetres (10.8 in). In 1938 Abovian's grandsons brought it to the museum. When Abovian's son Vardan returned to the Caucasus, he found the painting in a badly deteriorated condition. But by Vardan's request Armenian painter Gevorg Bashinjagyan restored the portrait. He cut worn-out edges, glued it to a hard paper and then filled the cracks with corresponding colours. The painter of the portrait was Ludwig von Maydell, from Dorpat University. He painted it in the fall of 1830, when Abovian was only 20 or 21 years old. This portrait is the only painting of Abovian made during his lifetime.

=== Statues ===
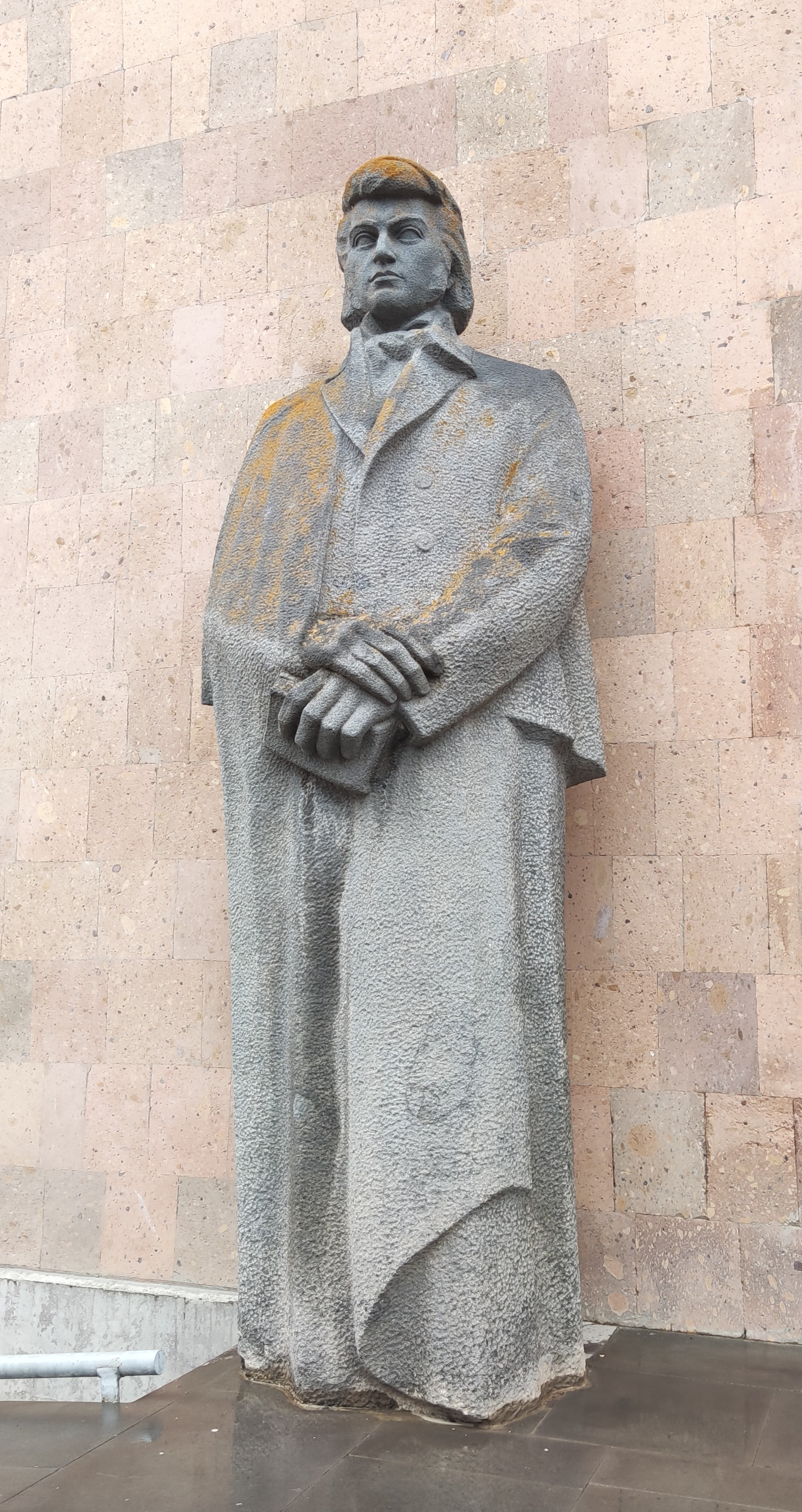
A statue of Abovian in Dilijan

Two prominent statues of Abovian stand in Yerevan. The concept of the first statue dates back to 1908 when a number of Armenian intellectuals in Russian Armenia decided to commemorate the 60th anniversary of Abovian's disappearance and raise funds for a statue. These included Alexander Shirvanzade, Hovhannes Tumanyan and Gevorg Bashinjagyan. By 1910 they had collected enough funds to order the statue. It was designed by M. Grigoryan and sculpted by Andreas Ter-Manukyan in Paris between 1910 and 1913. The statue is 4.5 metres (15 ft) high and made of bronze on a granite pedestal. As a result of a misunderstanding the statue was only delivered to Yerevan in 1925 and first erected on Abovian Street by the site of the Moscow Cinema in 1933 and then moved to the children's park on the banks of the Hrazdan River. In 1964, it found its permanent home by the Abovian house-museum in Kanaker. The second statue of Abovian in Yerevan was erected in Abovian square in 1950. The 9-metre (30 ft) high bronze statue was designed by Gevorg Tamanian (son of Alexander Tamanian) and sculpted by Suren Stepanyan.

=== Film ===
Between 1948 and 1984, five documentary films were produced in the Armenian SSR about the life and work of Abovian. In 2011, the documentary film Journey to Ararat on Parrot and Abovian's expedition to Mount Ararat was produced in Estonia by filmmaker Riho Västrik. It was screened at the Golden Apricot International Film Festival in Yerevan in 2013.

== See also ==
- List of people who disappeared

== Selected bibliography ==
=== Prose ===
Novels

- Wounds of Armenia, or Lamentation of the Patriot (Tiflis 1858)
- History of Tigran, or a Moral Manual for Armenian Children (1941)

Non-fiction

- Introduction to Education (Tiflis 1838)
- Collection of Algebra Exercises (1868)
- New Theoretical and Practical Russian Grammar for Armenians (1839)

Other

- Unpublished Works (Tiflis 1904)
- Unpublished Letters (Vienna 1929)

Stories

- The Turkish Girl (Yerevan 1941)

=== Poetry ===
- The Wine Jug (Tiflis 1912)
- Folk Songs (Yerevan 1939)
- Poems (Yerevan 1941)
- Poetry for Children (Yerevan 1941)

Fables

- Leisure Entertainment (Tiflis 1864, includes the play Feodora)
- Fables (Yerevan 1941)
