= Kanaker =

- Location within Armenia
- Coordinates: 40°13′12″N 44°32′18″E
- Country: Armenia
- Marz (Province): Yerevan
- District: Kanaker-Zeytun
- Time zone: UTC+4 ( )
  - Summer (DST): UTC+5 ( )

Kanaker (Armenian: Քանաքեռ; also Romanized as K’anak’err, Kenaker, Kanaker, and Qanaqer) was a village in Armenia to the north-east of the capital Yerevan. With the urban development of Yerevan in the 20th century, the village was gradually absorbed by the capital, thus becoming part of the Kanaker-Zeytun District.

Notable natives of Kanaker include the writer and educator Khachatur Abovian.

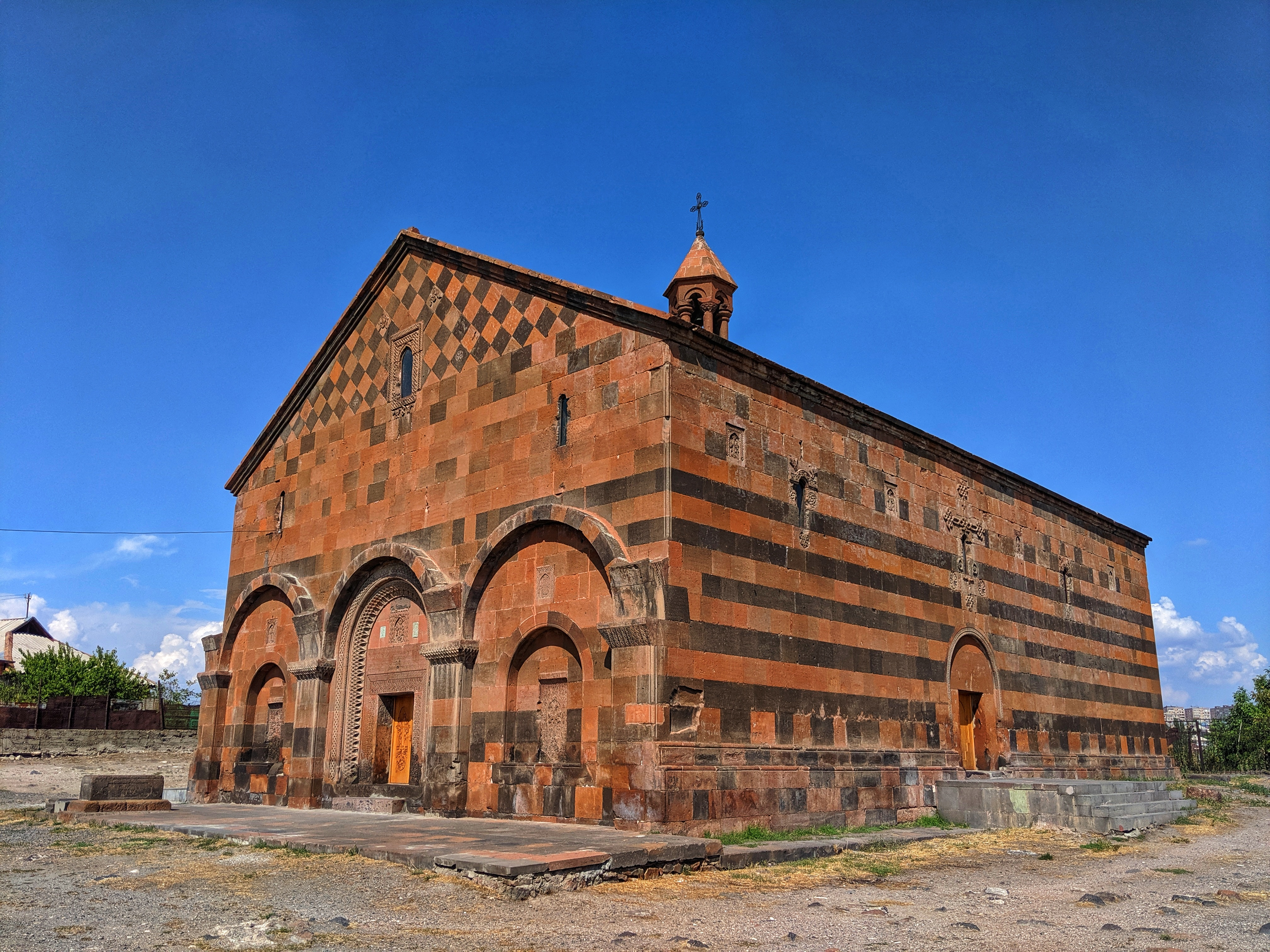
The Holy Mother of God Church

The town was home to many churches that were severely damaged during the earthquake of 1679. The oldest church of Kanaker is Saint Jacob Church (Surp Hakop) rebuilt in 1679 after the earthquake. Holy Mother of God Church (Surp Astvatsatsin) on a hilltop to the northwest was built in 1695. The Russian Orthodox Church of the Intercession of the Holy Mother of God was built in Kanaker in 1912.

Kanaker played a key role in the Russian siege of Yerevan in 1827.

== Education ==
The Chinese-Armenian Friendship School is in Kanaker.
