= Saint Astvatsatsin Church =

Saint or Surp Astvatsatsin Church may refer to:

- St. Astvatsatsin Church (Voskepar), Armenia
- Church of Saint Astvatsatsin, Darashamb, Iran
- Chugureti St. Astvatsatsin, an Armenian church in Old Tbilisi, Georgia
- Krtsanis Tsiranavor Surp Astvatsatsin, an Armenian church in Old Tbilisi, Georgia
- Surb Astvatsatsin Church of Areni, Areni, Armenia
- Surp Astvatsatsin Church of Karbi, a church in Aragatsotn, Armenia
- Vahramashen Surp Astvatsatsin, a church on Mount Aragats, Aragatsotn, Armenia
- Zoravor Surp Astvatsatsin Church, a church in Yerevan, Armenia
- Kamsarakan S. Astvatsatsin Church, a church next to the Cathedral of Talin, Aragatsotn, Armenia
- Surb Astvatsatsin Church, a church in the Noravank monastery complex in Vayots Dzor, Armenia
- Surp Astvatsatsin, a church in the abandoned village of Shenik, Aragatsotn, Armenia
- Surb Astvatsatsin or Karmravor Church, a church in Ashtarak, Aragatsotn, Armenia
- Saint Astvatsatsin Church (Ramis), Ramis, Azerbaijan

== See also ==
- Church of the Holy Mother of God (disambiguation)
- St. Astvatsatsin Monastery (disambiguation)
