= St Gregory's Church =

St. Gregory's Church, Church of St Gregory, or variants thereof, may refer to:

== Armenia ==
- St. Gregory Church in Haghartsin Monastery
- Saint Gregory the Illuminator Cathedral, Yerevan
- Saint Gregory the Illuminator Church, Yerevan (destroyed)

== Azerbaijan ==
- Saint Gregory the Illuminator's Church, Baku

== Georgia ==
- Saint Gregory the Illuminator Church, Tbilisi (destroyed)

== Malta ==
- Il-Knisja ta' Santa Katerina l-Antika, known as Ta' San Girgor, in Żejtun.

== Italy ==
- San Gregorio Armeno, Naples

== Singapore ==
- Armenian Church, Singapore (dedicated to St. Gregory the Illuminator)

== United States ==
- St. Gregory the Great Church, Danbury, Connecticut
- Church of St. Gregory the Great (New York City)
- St. Gregory's Church (St. Nazianz, Wisconsin)

== United Kingdom ==
=== England ===
- St Gregory's Church, Bedale
- St Gregory's Church, Cheltenham, Gloucestershire
- St Gregory's Church, Heckingham, Norfolk
- St Gregory's Minster, Kirkdale, North Yorkshire
- St Gregory by St Paul's, City of London (destroyed)
- St Gregory's Church, Longton, Staffordshire
- St Patrick's Church, Preston Patrick, Cumbria (formerly St Gregory's)
- Church of St Gregory, Stoke St Gregory, Somerset
- Church of St Gregory, Weare, Somerset
- St Gregory's Church, Vale of Lune, Cumbria

=== Scotland ===
- St. Gregory's Church, Preshome

== See also ==
- St. Gregory's Abbey, Three Rivers, Michigan, United States
- Saint Gregory the Great Parish Church (disambiguation)
- Saint Gregory the Illuminator Church (disambiguation)
