= Saint Gregory the Great Parish Church =

Saint Gregory the Great Parish Church may refer to:

- Saint Gregory the Great Parish Church in Indang, Cavite, Philippines.
- Saint Gregory the Great Parish Church in Majayjay, Laguna, Philippines.
- Saint Gregory the Great Parish Church in Manhattan, New York, United States.
- Saint Gregory the Great Church in Danbury, Connecticut.
- Saint Gregory the Great Church in Cheltenham, Gloucestershire, England.

== See also ==
- St Gregory's Church (disambiguation)
- Saint Gregory the Great
