= Saint George's Church, Tbilisi =

Church building in Tbilisi, Georgia

Saint George's Church
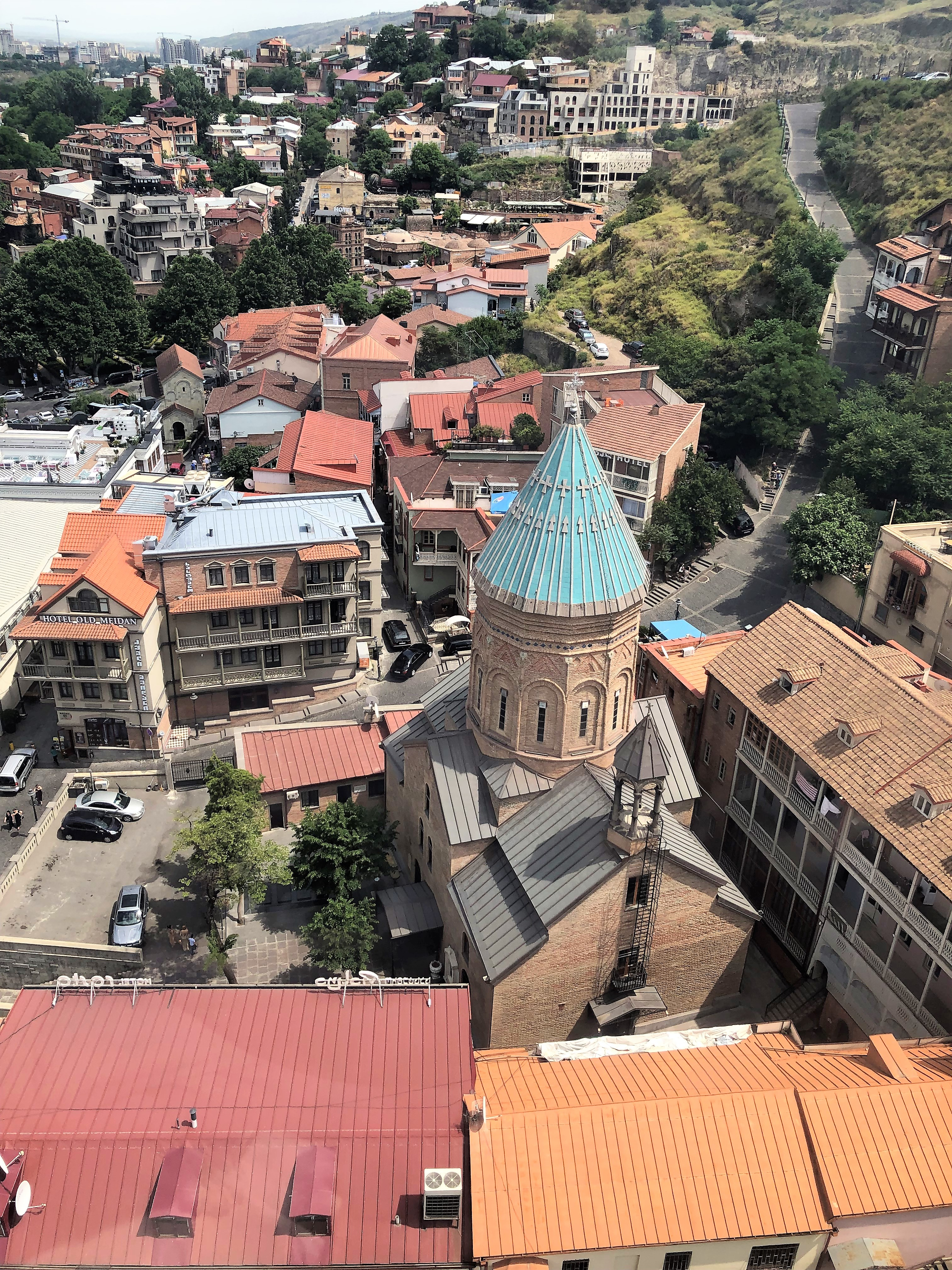
- The church in 2019

Religion
- Affiliation: Armenian Apostolic Church
- Status: Active

Location
- Location: 5 Samghebro Street, Tbilisi, Georgia
- Interactive map of Saint George's Church
- Coordinates: 41.6892°N 44.8089°E

Architecture
- Style: Armenian
- Completed: 1251 or earlier

Saint George's Church (Armenian: Սուրբ Գևորգ եկեղեցի, Surb Gevorg yekeghetsi; Georgian: სურფგევორქი, sur′pgevork′i) is a 13th-century Armenian church in the old city of Tbilisi, Georgia. It is one of the two functioning Armenian churches in Tbilisi and is the cathedral of the Georgian Diocese of the Armenian Apostolic Church. It is located in the south-western corner of Vakhtang Gorgasali Square (Meidani) and is overlooked by the ruins of Narikala fortress.

== History ==
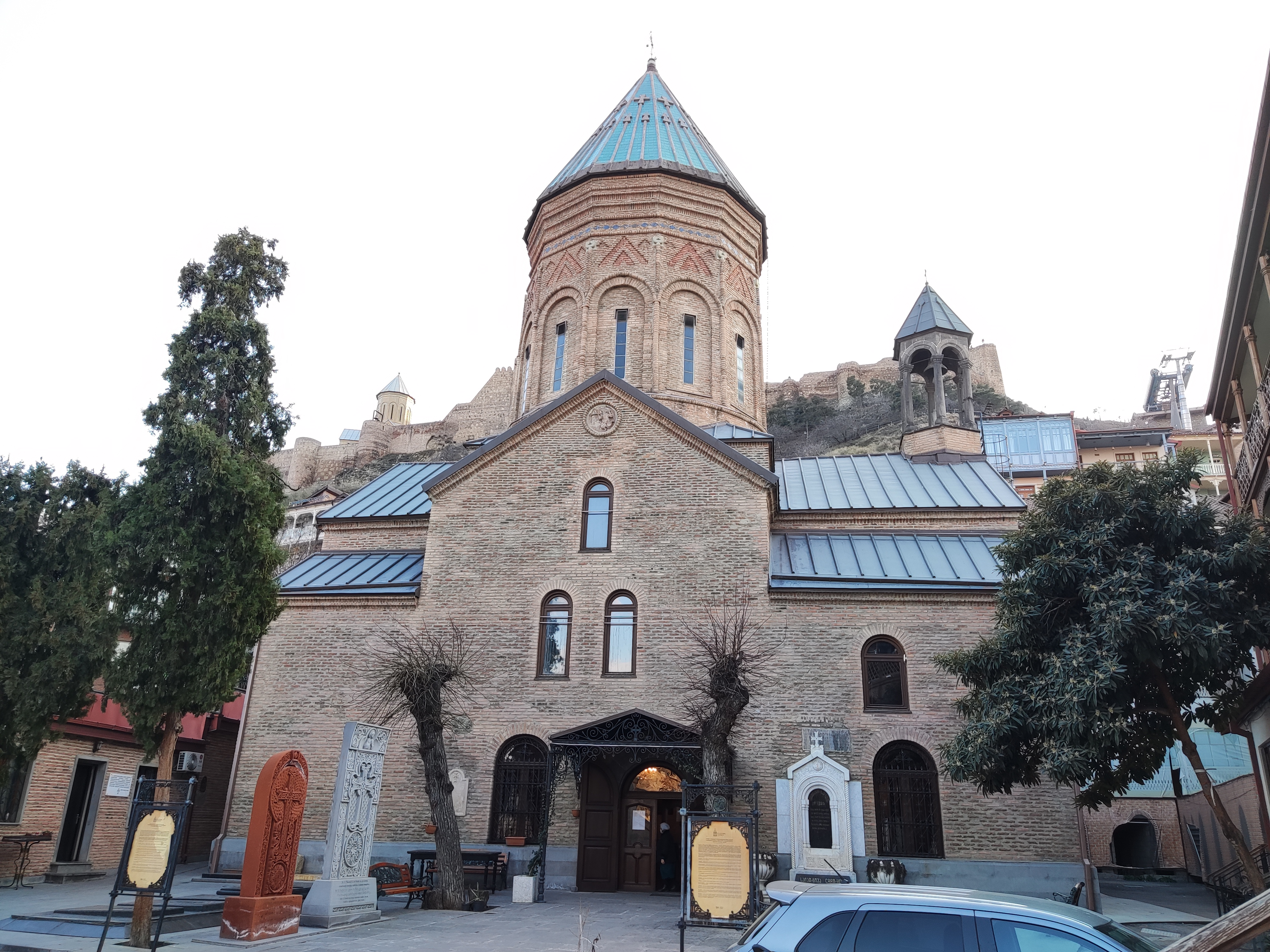
The church and its courtyard

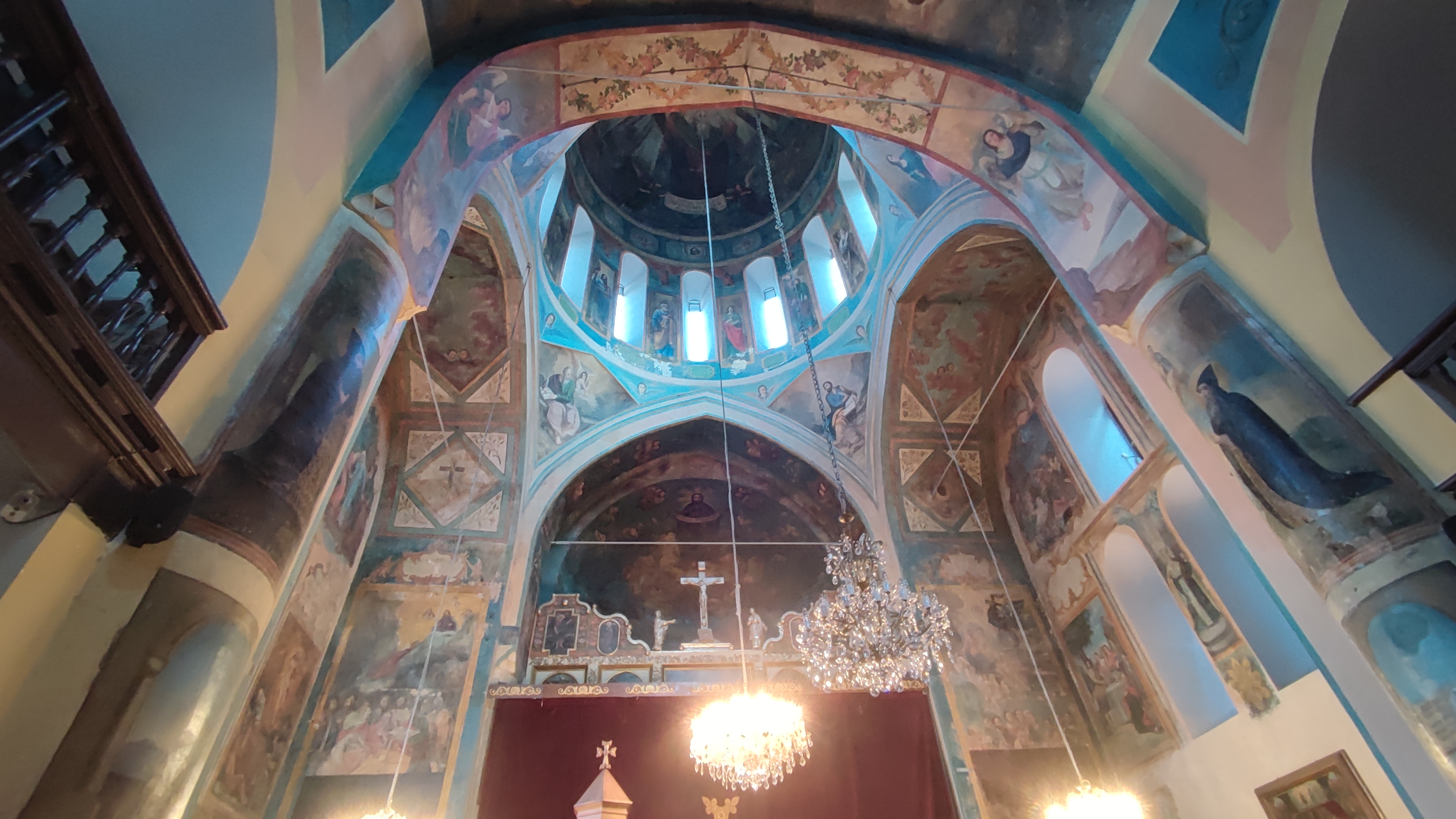
The church's interior

According to the Tbilisi municipality website, the area where the church is located used to belong to the prison district during the Middle Ages, hence the occasional Georgian name, Tsikhisdidi (tsikhe = prison, didi = big).

According to Armenian historians Hovsep Orbeli and Levon Melikset-Bek, the church was founded in 1251. The date was proposed based on an Arabic inscription on a khachkar over the western door of the churchyard. According to 13th century chronicler Hovhannes Erznkatsi, the church was built by Prince Umek of Karin (Erzurum). According to Jean-Michel Thierry, Umek was a wealthy merchant who settled in Tiflis, and married Princess Mama Vahtangian, the daughter of Hasan Jalal Vahtangian, Grand Prince of Khachen (ruled 1214–61). However, the Diocese of the Armenian Apostolic Church in Georgia website claims that the church existed long before the 13th century and that Erznkatsi refers to the church being rebuilt and not being built by Umek. According to the Armenian Diocese, the church may have been founded as early as 631.

The church was given to the Persian garrison by Safavid Shah Abbas I of Persia in 1616 and returned to the Armenian community in 1748 by King Heraclius II of Georgia. It was burnt when Persians sacked Tbilisi in 1795. The church was thoroughly restored in the 17th century, and then again in 1832 and 1881.

It became the seat of the Georgian Diocese of the Armenian Apostolic Church after the Vank Cathedral was demolished by Soviet authorities in the 1930s.

Renovation works were carried out in 1977–78 to enhance its foundations and protect them from moisture, and its entire roof was replaced with new metal sheets. Additionally, six previously unseen frescoes were discovered and restored.

The most recent renovation of the church began in 2012. Initiated and financed by Russian-Armenian businessman Ruben Vardanian, the renovation was supported by donations of philanthropists Albert Avdolyan, Sergey Sarkisov and Rusudan Makhashvili, Danil Khachaturov, former Georgian Prime Minister Bidzina Ivanishvili, and others. Some $3.5 million was spent on its renovation, which was completed in 2015. The church was reconsecrated on October 31, 2015, by Catholicos Karekin II, the head of the Armenian Church. The ceremony was attended by Armenian President Serzh Sargsyan and Ivanishvili.

In February 2019 a video surfaced online showing three ethnic Azerbaijanis, one of them burning the flag of Armenia (but more similar to the flag of Colombia) in front of the church. An Armenian diocese spokesperson said the incident had occurred months earlier.

== Architecture and frescoes ==
The church is built on a traditional plan of a partitioned, open cross with a rectangular perimeter. Like most of the churches in Tbilisi, it is built in brick. The outer walls of the church are covered with stucco.

Late 18th-century paintings by Hovnatan Hovnatanian decorate the church's interior. Between 1922 and 1923, Gevorg Bashinjaghian decorated the church's internal walls, the altar, and the walls in front of it, creating four large murals: Jesus in the Garden of Gethsemane, The Repentance of Judas, Jesus and the Boatmen, Harvest time.

== Burials ==
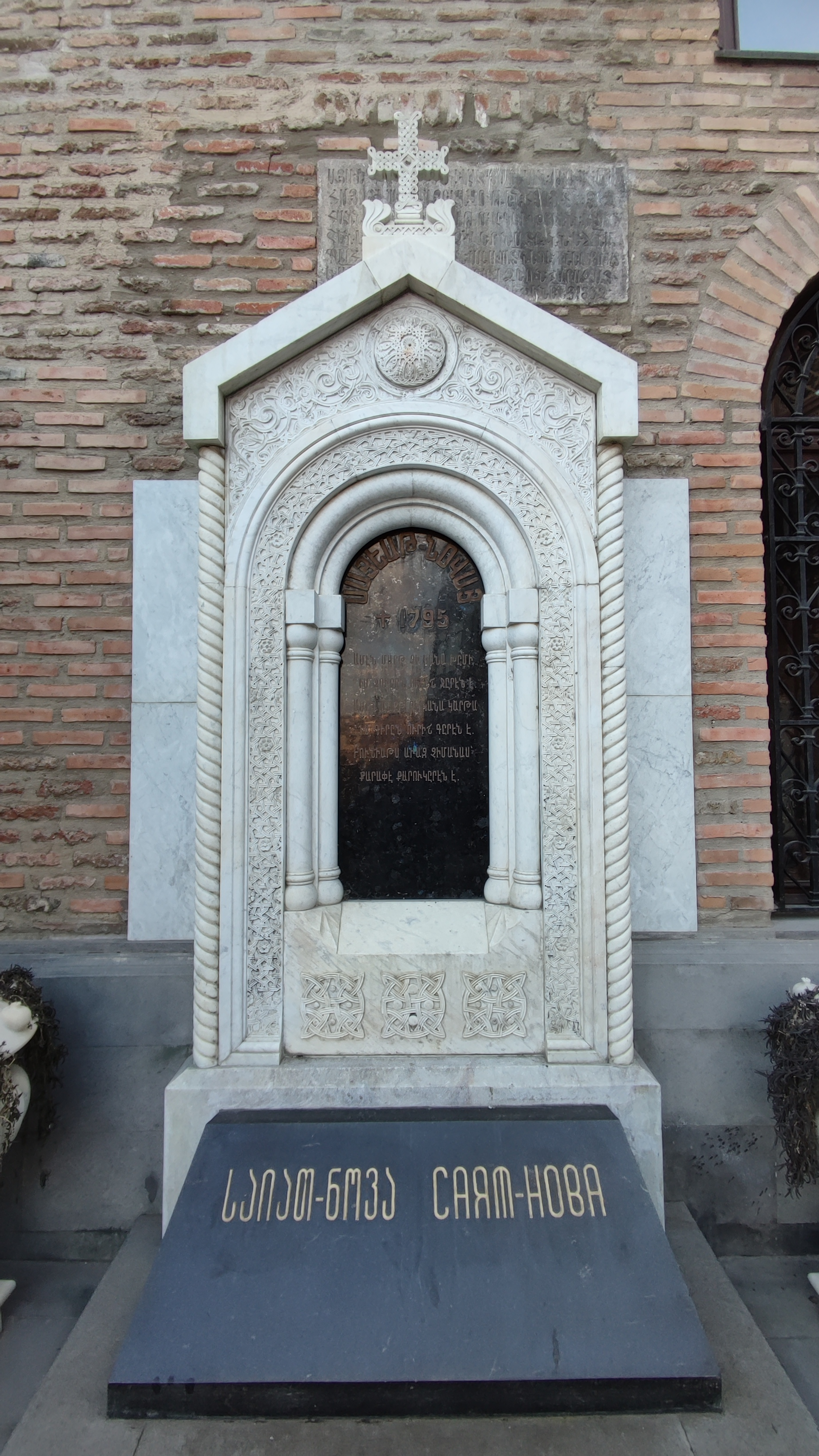
Sayat-Nova's tomb-memorial

The following people are buried at the church courtyard:

- Sayat-Nova (d. 1795), poet and musician
- Gevorg Bashinjaghian (d. 1925), painter

Including the following Russian generals of Armenian origin:

- Beybut Shelkovnikov (d. 1878)
- Ivan (Hovhannes) Lazarev (d. 1879)
- Arshak Ter-Gukasov (d. 1881)
- Mikhail Loris-Melikov (d. 1888)

== Gallery ==
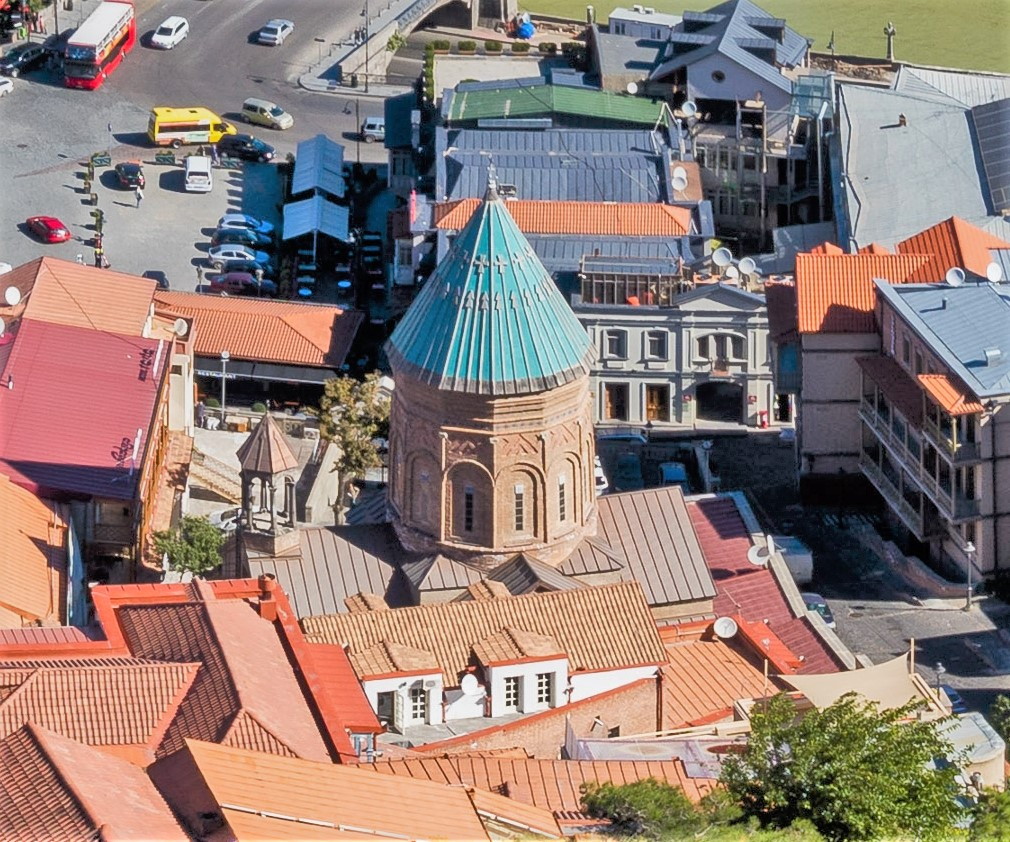
As seen from Narikala

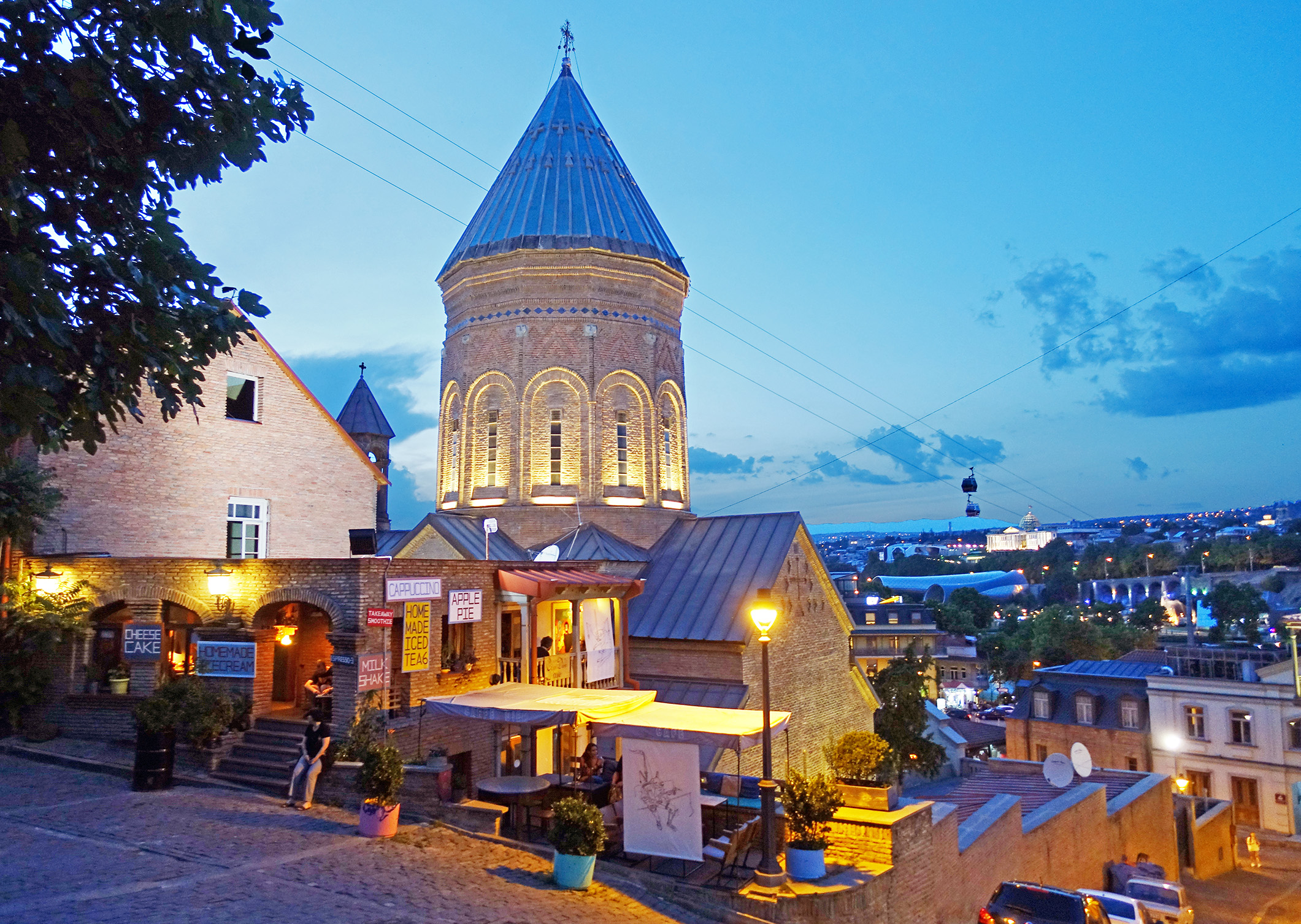

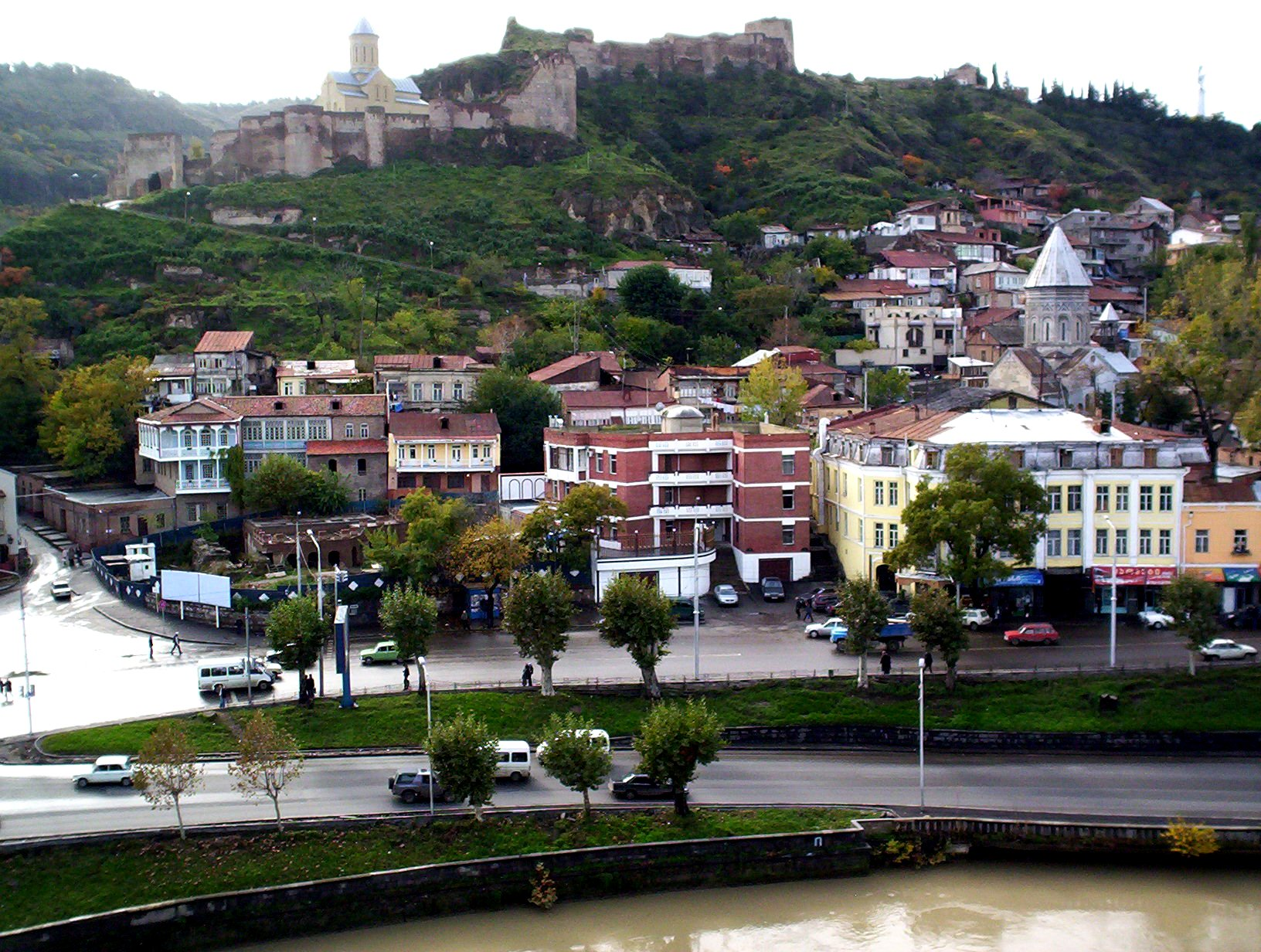
View of the church (middle right) and the Narikala fortress

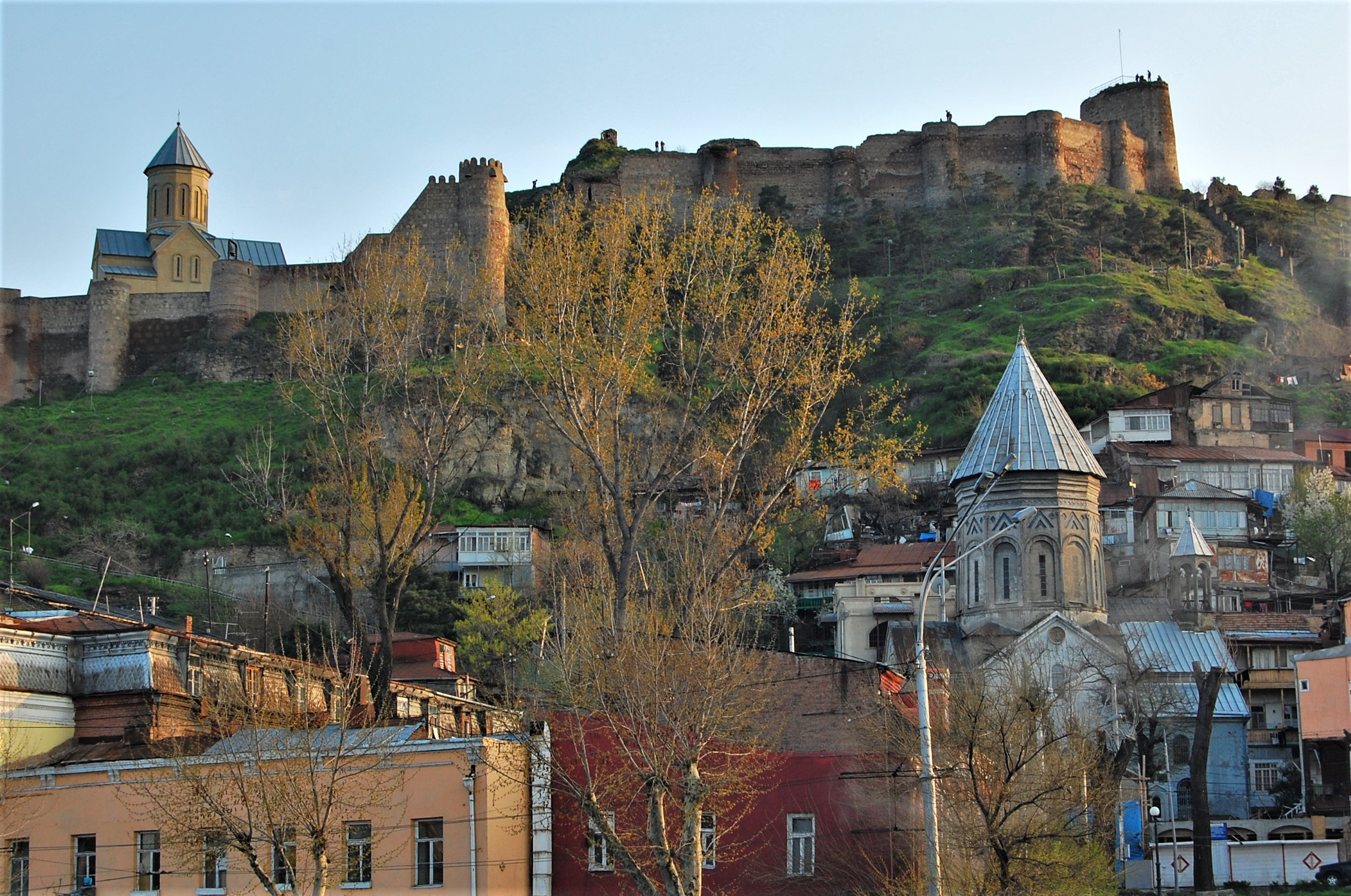
View of the church from Gorgasali Square

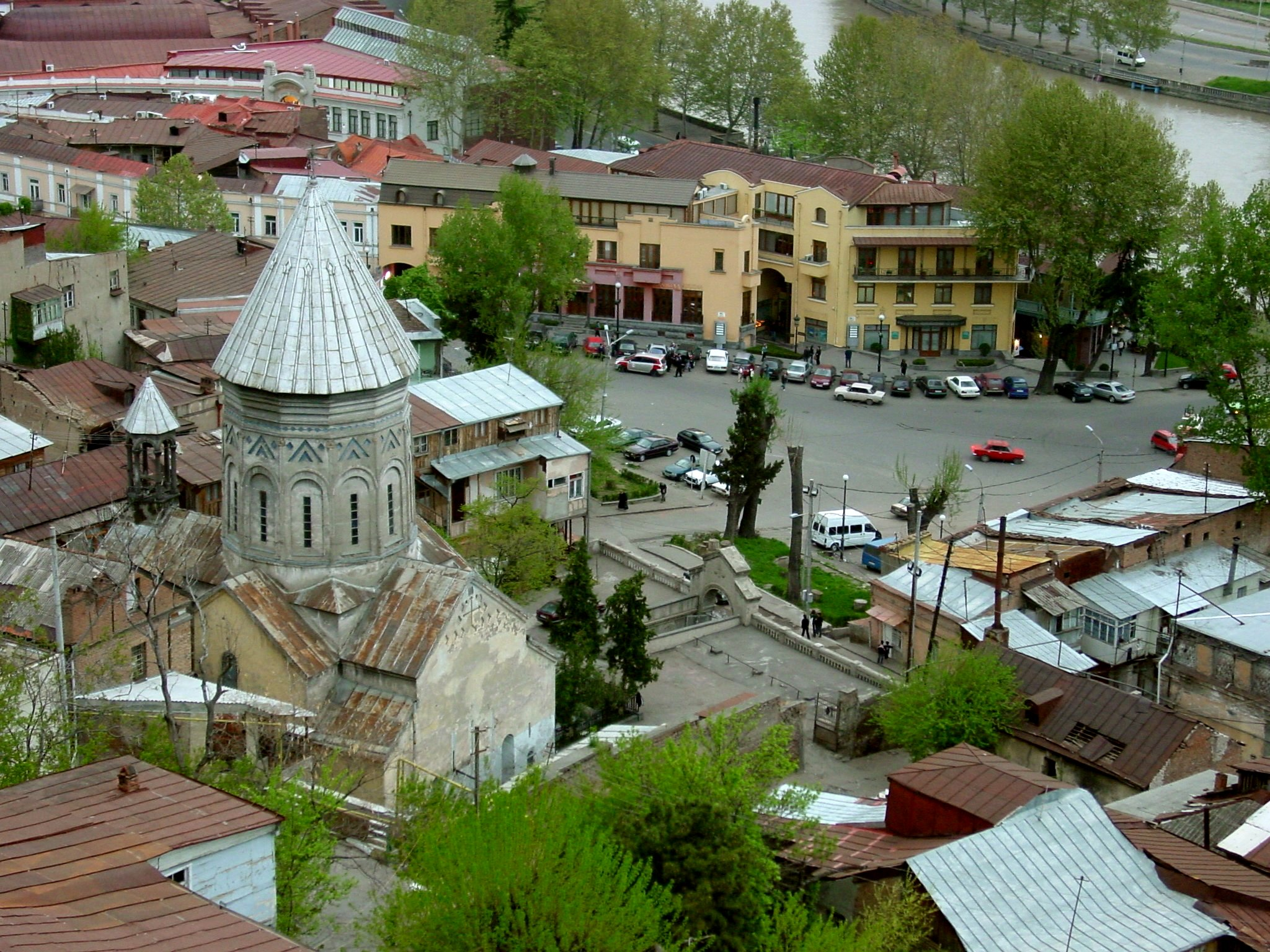
Top view of the church

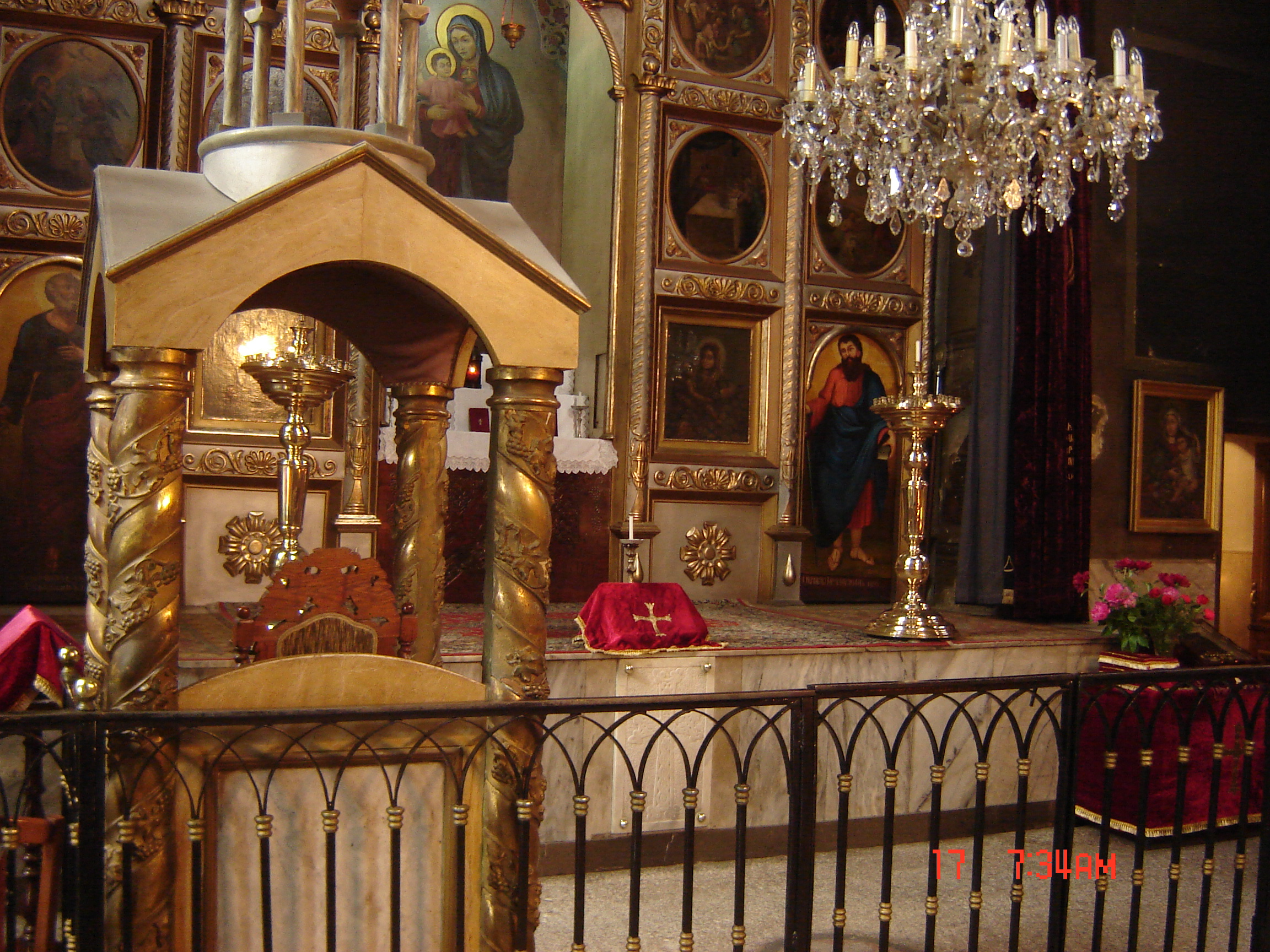
Altar

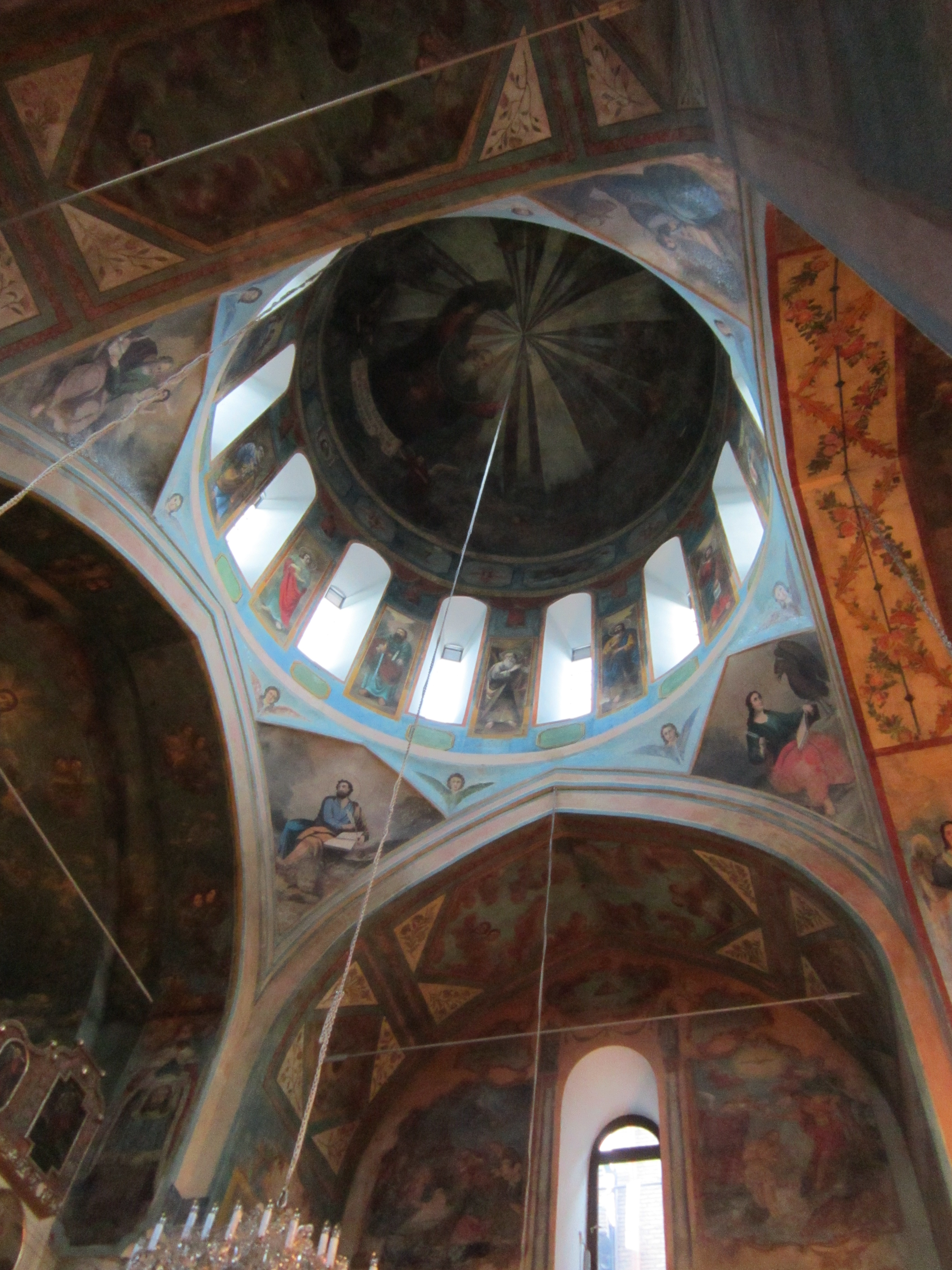
Interior

== See also ==
- Armenians in Georgia
- Armenians in Tbilisi
- Armenian churches of Tbilisi
