= Saint Karapet Church, Tbilisi =

Church building in Tbilisi, Georgia

Coordinates: 41°41′53.2″N 44°48′36.3″E

Saint Karapet Church
- წმინდა კარაპეტის ეკლესია Սուրբ Կարապետ եկեղեցի
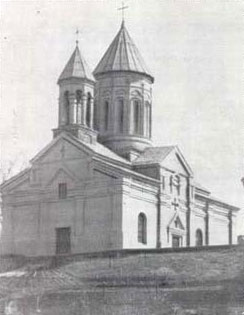

- Location within Georgia

Religion
- Affiliation: Georgian Orthodox Church / Armenian Apostolic Church

Location
- Location: Between Chugureti and Avlabari; Old Tbilisi, Georgia

Architecture
- Style: Armenian
- Completed: supp. 1705

Saint Karapet Church (Georgian: წმინდა კარაპეტის ეკლესია, Armenian: Սուրբ Կարապետ եկեղեցի; Russian: Церковь св. Карапет) is an Armenian church now functioning as Georgian Orthodox church in Old Tbilisi, Georgia. It is located between the Chugureti and Avlabari districts.

== Construction ==
The date of foundation is unclear because of various sometimes mutually excluding versions. In the list of Armenian heritage ordered by Nerses Ashtaraketsi St. Karapet is mentioned as following: "Built by a nobleman Baghdasar Isahak Kamazov in 1705, later renovated by the community". According to other sources the builder was "mokalak Kazazov", who built the church in 1400, which later was renovated in 1790. Kamazov and Kazazov must be the same person, but the dates range is huge. Other source – the drum of Bethlehem church has note claiming construction of St. Karapet Church by Amir Agha and his wife Beki khatun in 1664. The stone must have been located in St. Karapet church drum, but how it appeared in Bethlehem church is unclear. It may be supposed that by start of 18th century St. Karapet might have been in ruins and the stone with the note was moved to Bethlehem church. But it is not clear the stone refers to St. Karapet church, because there were also Kamoyants and Sahakashen churches also dedicated to St. Karapet Forerunner.

== Interesting facts ==
Among famous Armenians who studied here was Nar-Dos.

Jason Tumanian, a mayor of Tbilisi, with all his family were buried in the yard of the church.

The church once had decorated doors in the traditions of Armenian ornamental art: they were removed after the end of the Soviet Union.

== Soviet years and modern times ==
During the Soviet-era Saint Karapet was not a functioning church, but it escaped the destruction that was the fate of 11 other Armenian churches destroyed by Lavrentiy Beria's orders in the 1930s.

In 1995 the bell tower was demolished and the church was reconsecrated by the Georgian Church and now functions as a Georgian Orthodox church.

== See also ==
- Armenians in Tbilisi
- List of Armenian Apostolic Churches in Georgia
