= Saint Gregory the Illuminator Church =

Saint Gregory the Illuminator Church may refer to:

- Church of St Gregory of the Illuminator in Ani, Turkey, dated to 1215
- Saint Gregory the Illuminator Cathedral, Antelias, seat of the Catholicossate of the Great House of Cilicia also known as Holy See of Cilicia
- Saint Gregory the Illuminator Cathedral, Yerevan, the largest Armenian church in the world, in Yerevan, Armenia built in 2001
- Cathedral of Saint Elie and Saint Gregory the Illuminator, Armenian Catholic church in downtown Beirut, Lebanon built in 1940
- Saint Gregory the Illuminator's Church, Baku, a non-functioning Armenian Apostolic church in Baku, Azerbaijan built in 1887
- Ruins of Cathedral of St. Gregory the Illuminator in Zvartnots, Armenia built in the 7th century
- Armenian Church, Singapore, an Armenian Apostolic church in Singapore, otherwise known as Church of Saint Gregory the Illuminator, built in 1835
- Saint Gregory the Illuminator Cathedral, Cairo, an Armenian church in Cairo, Egypt built in 1928
- Saint Gregory the Illuminator Church, an Armenian Catholic church in Glendale, California built in 2001

Destroyed churches

- Saint Gregory the Illuminator Church, Yerevan, was an Armenian Apostolic church in Yerevan, built in the 19th century and destroyed in 1939
- Saint Gregory the Illuminator Church, Tbilisi, was an Armenian Apostolic church in Tbilisi, destroyed in the 1930s

== See also ==
- St Gregory's Church (disambiguation)
