= Arshak Ter-Gukasov =

Arshak Ter-Gukasov Արշակ Տեր-Ղուկասյան
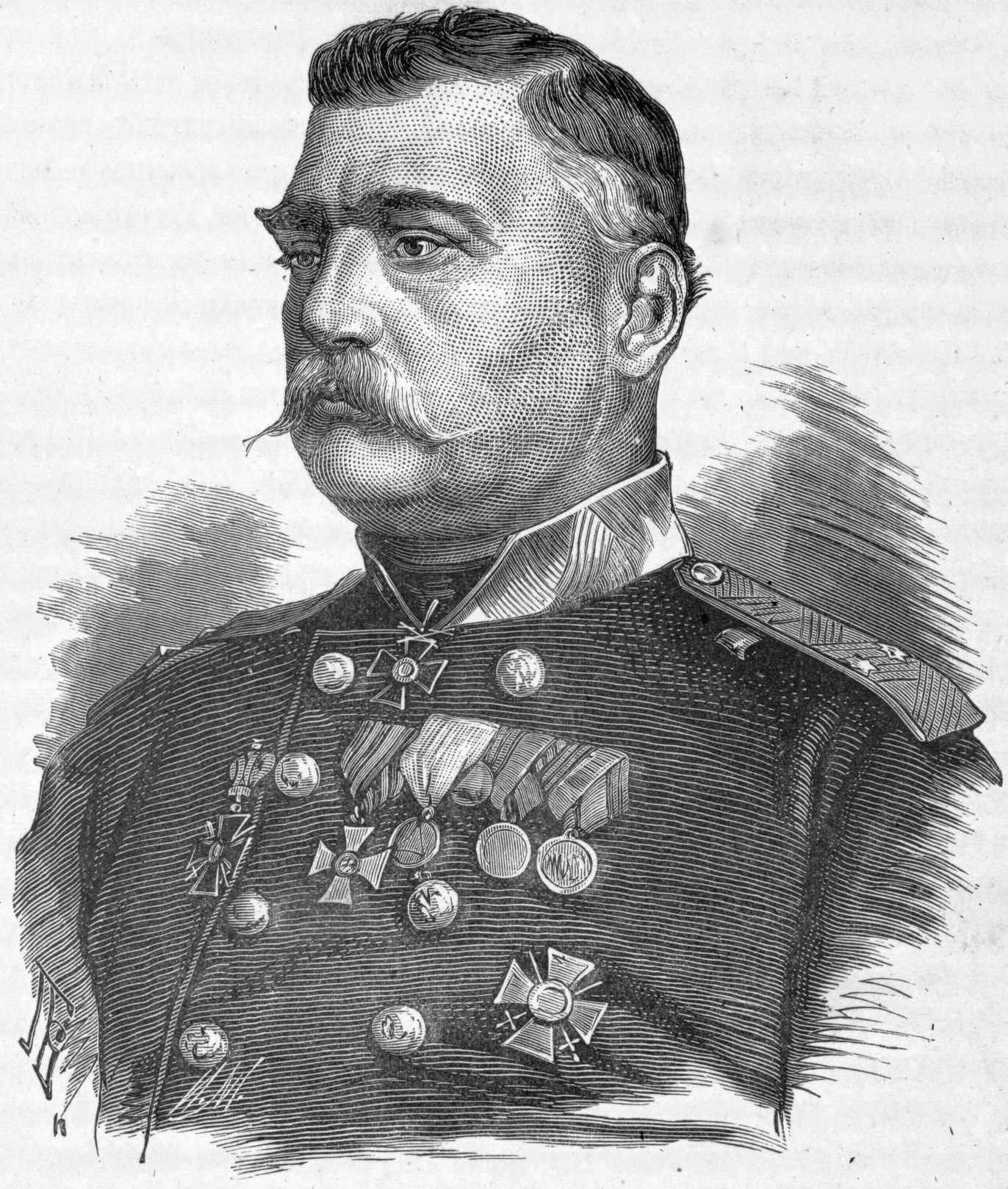
- Born: 1819; Tiflis, Russian Empire (today Georgia)
- Died: 8 January 1881 (aged 61–62); Tiflis, Russian Empire
- Burial place: Saint Gevorg Church, Tiflis
- Military career
- Allegiance: Russian Empire
- Branch: Imperial Russian Army
- Service years: 1850–1881
- Rank: Lieutenant General
- Commands: 38th Infantry Division; Second Russian Caucasus Army Corps
- Conflicts: Caucasian War; Russo-Turkish War
- Awards: Order of St. George; Order of St. Vladimir; Order of Saint Anna; Order of St. Stanislaus; Pour le Mérite

Arshak Ter-Gukasov (Armenian: Արշակ Տեր-Ղուկասյան; Russian: Тергукасов, Арзас Артемьевич, romanized: Arzas Artemyevich Tergukasov) (1819 – 8 January 1881) was a Lieutenant-General of the Russian Empire. Born to an Armenian family in Tiflis, he started his military career in 1850 and was subsequently involved in the Caucasian War. After being promoted to the rank of lieutenant general, and serving various governmental posts, he was then assigned as the Yerevan Forces commander of Russia's army during the Russo-Turkish War of 1877–1878. Owing to his successes in battle, Arshak Ter-Gukasov was awarded medals by Imperial Russia and other foreign powers.

== Life and career ==
Arshak Ter-Gukasov was born in the Havlabar district of Tiflis, Georgia in 1819 to an Armenian family of clergymen originally from Shamkhor (today Şəmkir, Azerbaijan). Ter-Gukasov attended the local Armenian Nersisian School. To continue his education, Ter-Gukasov moved to Saint Petersburg and studied at the St. Petersburg State University of Communication where he graduated in 1839. As an engineer, Ter-Gukasov was assigned to build roadways for the Russian army in the Caucasus between the years 1842 to 1850. He was then appointed as the 2nd Communications Manager of the Caucasus.

=== Military career ===
==== War in the Caucasus ====
Ter-Gukasov joined the Russian military in 1850. He then became part of the Apsheron 3rd Infantry Regiment. Due to his relative success in subsequent battles, notably in engagements with Chechen and Daghestani tribesmen in Dilim and Burtuna, he was promoted to the General of the Apsheron Infantry Regiment in 1859. In August 1859, Ter-Gukasov was part of the siege of Gunib, when Imam Shamil, leader of the Chechen and Daghestani tribes, made his last stand against the Russians at Gunib, where he surrendered to the Russian commander, Prince Alexander Baryatinsky, on 25 August 1859. Demonstrating success on the battlefield, Ter-Gukasov was bestowed the Order of St. George.

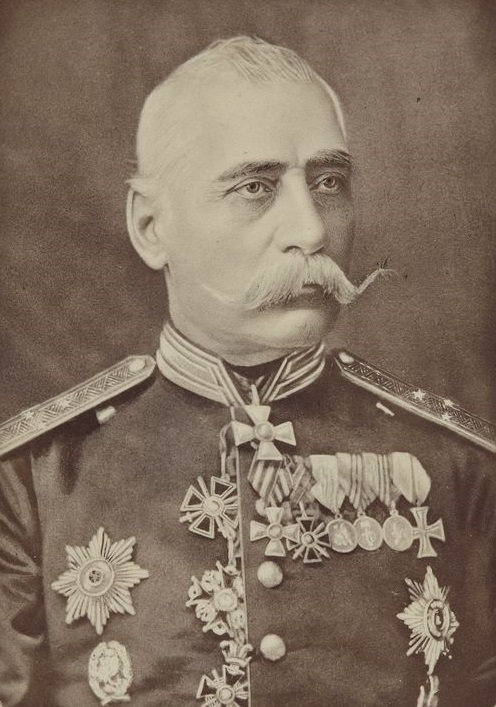
Arshak Ter-Gukasov was awarded medals by Imperial Russia and other foreign powers.

In 1865 Arshak Ter-Gukasov was promoted to the rank of major general and was given the 19th artillery division under his command. Meanwhile, he assumed the position of district-governor of the Terek province. A year later, he was appointed as commander to the 38th Infantry Division and 1874, was promoted to the rank of Lieutenant-General.

==== Russian-Turkish war of 1877–78 ====
The Russo-Turkish War of 1877–78 was a conflict between the Ottoman Empire and the Eastern Orthodox coalition led by the Russian Empire and composed of several Balkan countries. Fought in the Balkans and in the Caucasus, it originated in emerging 19th-century Balkan nationalism. Additional factors included Russian hopes of recovering territorial losses suffered during the Crimean War, re-establishing itself in the Black Sea and supporting the political movement attempting to free Balkan nations from the Ottoman Empire.

Stationed in the Caucasus in Georgia and Armenia was the Russian Caucasus Corps designated for the eastern front, composed of approximately 50,000 men and 202 guns under the overall command of Grand Duke Michael Nikolaevich, Governor General of the Caucasus. The Russian force stood opposed an Ottoman Army of 100,000 men led by General Ahmed Muhtar Pasha.

The Caucasus Corps was led by a quartet of Armenian commanders: Generals Arshak Ter-Gukasov, Mikhail Loris-Melikov, Ivan Lazarev and Beybut Shelkovnikov. It was the forces under Ter-Gukasov, numbering at around 13,000 soldiers, stationed near Yerevan, that commenced the first assault into Ottoman territory by capturing the town of Bayazid on 27 April 1877. Capitalizing on Ter-Gukasov's victory there, Russian forces advanced, taking the region of Ardahan on 17 May; Russian units also besieged the city of Kars in the final week of May, although Ottoman reinforcements lifted the siege and drove them back. Along the way to Erzurum, Ter-Gukasov managed to capture the villages of Karakilise, Diadin, and the Eleşkirt valley.

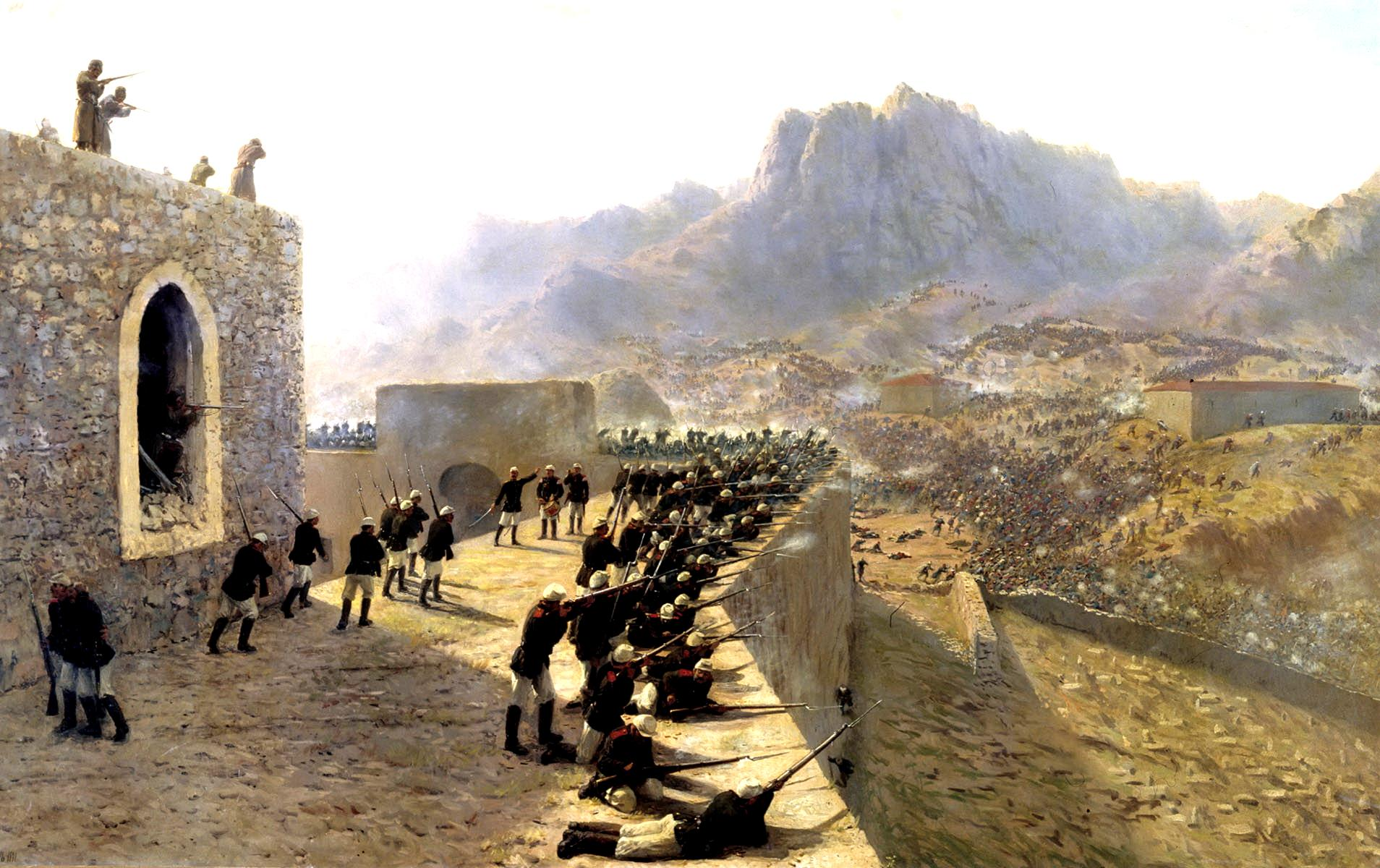
Russian troops repulsing the Turkish assault at Beyazid on June 8, 1877. A few days later, Ter-Gukasov relieved Russian defenses in what would be deemed a "really brilliant operation".

Skirmishes continued with Turkish forces in and around Dramdag and Karaderbent. Ter-Gukasov defeated Muhtar Pasha's much larger army and continued his march towards Erzurum. However, on June 15, Ter-Gukasov received orders to retreat to Iğdır to replenish his supplies and ammunition. With this retreat, 20,000 Armenian refugees, fearing a massacre if left unprotected, migrated alongside Ter-Gukasov's retreating soldiers. After defeating the Turkish armies attacks along the line of retreat, Ter-Gukasov safely passed through Russian territory. Meanwhile, however, a new offensive was launched towards Beyazid by Ismail Shah, a Kurdish chieftain based in Van. Ismail Shah had already been responsible for the massacres of Armenians throughout the province of Van. His soldiers continued to harass and pillage Armenian villages under his control. With a limited number of Russian troops garrisoned in Beyazid, Ter-Gukasov marched to Beyazid on 8 July to assist in its defense. After a brief siege, Ter-Gukasov successfully repulsed Ismail Shah's troops. The Russian soldiers are widely regarded as being "saved" from an inevitable defeat by the Turkish army. Ter-Gukasov's relief of Beyazid was a key factor in Russia's hold on the city, turning the tide of war in Russia's favor. With a low loss of 100 men during the confrontation, historians William Allen and Paul Muratoff called Ter-Gukasov's engagement a "really brilliant operation". Owing to these efforts, Ter-Gukasov was awarded the Order of the White Eagle and the 3rd class of the Order of St. George.

After Beyazid, Arshak Ter-Ghukasov mobilized his troops again towards the west and in October engages with Muhtar Pasha at Deveboynu, a decisive battle in which Muhtar Pasha was defeated by 4 November. Bolstered by reinforcements, in November 1877 General Lazarev launched a new attack on Kars, suppressing the southern forts leading to the city and capturing Kars itself on November 18.

In January 1878, Ter-Gukasov was appointed commander of the Akhaltsikhe regiment. Meanwhile, on 19 February 1878 the strategic fortress town of Erzerum was taken by the Russians after a lengthy siege. Although they relinquished control of Erzerum to the Ottomans at the end the war, the Russians acquired the regions of Batumi, Ardahan, Kars, Olti, and Sarikamish and reconstituted them into the Kars Oblast.

==== Post-war and death ====
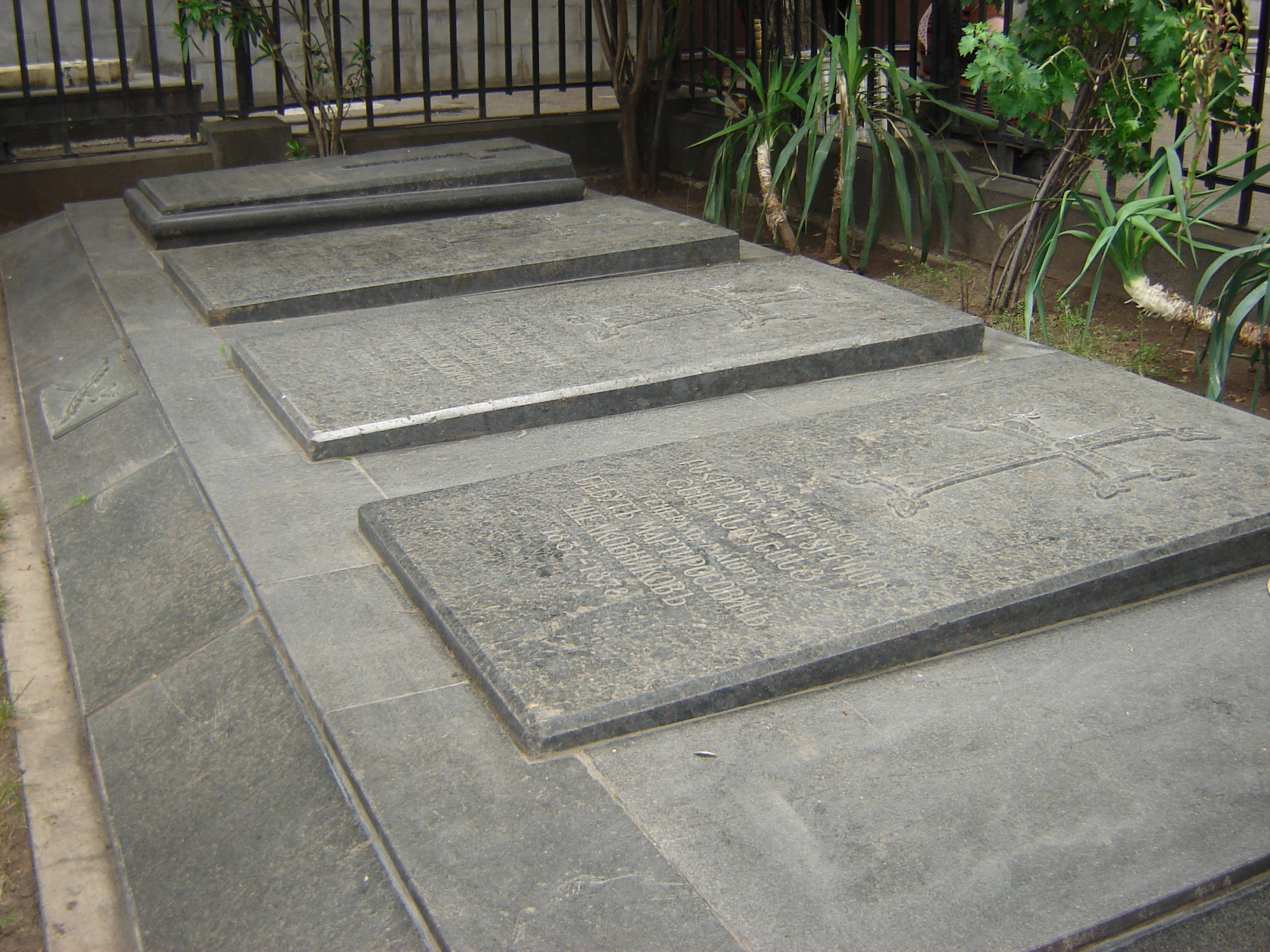
Ter-Gukasov is buried next to Russian-Armenian military commanders who fought alongside him during the Russian-Turkish war: Mikhail Loris-Melikov, Ivan Lazarev and Beybut Shelkovnikov.

After the Russo-Turkish War, Ter-Gukasov was appointed commander of troops in Transcaucasus. Thereafter, he was assigned as the Caucasian Corps commander. Meanwhile, his rank was assigned as General-Adjutant, an assistant who attended the Tsar, a field marshal or a general.

By this time, however, Ter-Gukasov's health greatly deteriorated. He traveled abroad to be treated, but the treatment ultimately failed. After returning to Tiflis, he rested at the London Hotel where he died on 8 January 1881.

The Russian government paid for Ter-Gukasov's funeral expenses. He was buried in St. Kevork Armenian Cathedral next to Russian-Armenian military commanders he fought alongside during the Russian-Turkish war of 1877–78: Mikhail Loris-Melikov, Ivan Lazarev and Beybut Shelkovnikov. His funeral was attended by many nobility including Grand Duke Michael Nikolaevich of Russia.

== Legacy ==
Arshak Ter-Gukasov is depicted during the siege of Bayazid in the first chapter of the novel Khent, written by Armenian writer Raffi.

== Awards and decorations ==
Country	Award		Year
Russian Empire	Order of St. Anna	I, II classes with Swords and Crown	1857–73
Russian Empire	Order of St. George	III, IV class	1859–78
Russian Empire	Gold Sword for Bravery	"For Bravery"	1860
Russian Empire	Order of St. Vladimir	II, III, IV classes	1860–77
Russian Empire	Order of St. Stanislaus	I class	1867
Russian Empire	Order of the White Eagle	with Swords	1877
Kingdom of Prussia	Pour le Mérite		1878
