= Ivan Davidovich Lazarev =

Ivan Davidovich Lazarev Հովհաննես Լազարյան
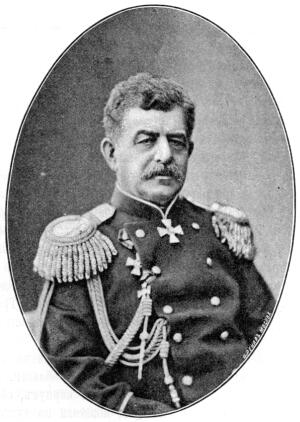
- Born: 17 October 1820; Shusha, Karabakh, Russian Empire
- Died: 14 August 1879 (aged 58); Caspian Sea
- Burial place: Saint Gevorg Church, Tiflis
- Military career
- Allegiance: Russian Empire
- Branch: Imperial Russian Army
- Service years: 1839–1879
- Rank: Lieutenant General
- Commands: Second Russian Caucasus Army Corps
- Conflicts: Caucasian War; Russo-Turkish War
- Awards: Order of St. George; Order of St. Vladimir; Order of Saint Anna

Ivan Davidovich Lazarev (Armenian: Հովհաննես Դավթի Լազարյան, Hovhannes Davti Lazarian; Russian: Иван Давыдович Лазарев; 17 October 1820 – 14 August 1879) was an Imperial Russian Army general.

== Biography ==
Ivan Lazarev was born Hovhannes Lazarian on 17 October 1820 in Shusha, in the Nagorno Karabakh region of what was then part of the Russian Empire, where he also received his education as a child. In 1839 he began his military career in the Caucasus, and in 1842 was commissioned as an officer in the Shirvanskii Infantry Regiment.

=== North Caucasus ===
Before the 1877-78 war with the Ottoman Empire, Lazarev made his name in the northern Caucasus. He was assigned, like many officers, to fight in the Murid War in Dagestan against the Imam Shamil. Lazarev, unlike most officers, took the time to study and learn Circassian, the language used by the local natives. With this knowledge he was the first to enter into negotiations with the Muslim rebels and began talks to negotiate peace. In 1840 he was involved in the initial arrest of Hadji Murad. His crowning achievement in this theater was the talks he held with the defeated Shamil, whom he convinced to surrender to the Russians in 1859. For this, he was promoted to general.

=== Russo-Turkish War ===
Eleven years after his career in Dagestan, he was called to serve on the Caucasian front against the Ottomans in the Russo-Ottoman War of 1877-78. In preparation for a grand assault against the formidable fortress town of Kars, Lazarev was given command of a large force consisting of 11.25 battalions, 15 squadrons, and 40 field guns, part of the larger Aleksandropol Detachment under the command of fellow Armenian general Mikhail Loris-Melikov. Lazarev's force was arrayed against the army of Ottoman field marshal Ahmed Muhtar Pasha.

Lazarev's force advanced steadily from its starting position west of Aleksandropol in September 1877, pushing Muhtar Pasha back to Kars (which was surrounded by a series of other forts). His men scored one of the most important victories against the Ottomans on the Caucasian Front at Alacadağ. In October, they invested Kars' citadel, pounding it with artillery for several weeks while reducing the other forts. On the night of 5/6 November, a Russian army council decided to issue the order to storm Kars. The assault the following day overwhelmed Kars' 25,000 defenders, resulting in 7,000 Ottoman dead and wounded and almost 18,000 prisoners of war.

After the war, he was appointed commander of the II Caucasian Army Corps.

=== Turkmenistan ===
In 1879, Lazarev was given command of an expedition to Turkmenistan. As the campaign was beginning, he fell ill when a boil began to form on his left shoulder. He initially insisted on accompanying his troops, but as his health deteriorated he asked that he be relieved of his command and urged that Lieutenant General Petrov replace him as head of the expedition. He died in Chat on August 14, 1879. Instead of Petrov, Lazarev was replaced by his less competent subordinate, Lomakin, pending the arrival of General Arshak Ter-Gukasov. Lomakin did not wait for Ter-Gukasov's arrival, however, and went on to lose the battle at Geok Tepe.

Lazarev's body was brought back to Tiflis, where he is buried alongside the other Armenian generals (Loris-Melikov, Ter-Gukasov) in the courtyard of the Armenian Cathedral of St George.
