= Jigrashen Avetyats Church =

Church building in Tbilisi, Georgia

Jigrashen Avetyats Church Ջիգրաշեն Ավետյաց եկեղեցի
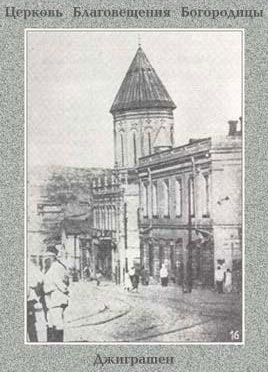

- Location within Georgia

Religion
- Affiliation: Armenian Apostolic Church

Location
- Location: Old Tbilisi, Georgia
- Coordinates: 42°N 45°E

Architecture
- Style: Armenian
- Completed: 1624 or 1729

Jigrashen Avetyats Church (Armenian: Ջիգրաշեն Ավետյաց եկեղեցի; Russian: Церковь Джиграшен св. Аветьяц) was an Armenian Apostolic church in Tbilisi, Georgia. It was destroyed in 1937-38 by order of Lavrentiy Beria along with 10 other churches in Tbilisi.

== History ==
The foundation of this church has two main versions.

According to Simeon, archpriest of this church, in his note dated 1815 he mentions that according to the old men memories priests Barsegh, David and other brethren of St. Nshan church left the construction of St. Nshan and started constructing their new adobe Jigrashen. The place was presented by families of Pirgulyan and Ter-Danielyan. They constructed two men height walls. For long time the church remained unfinished. Receiving 60 tumans from Bejanbek from Gori made the construction up the ceiling. Later agha-Iovannes Amatuni coming to Tbilisi crashed the unfinished walls and started from beginning. The work he started was continued by his successor. In the western part they built using a new foundation. The construction ended in 7 years and cost 1700 tumans together with the bell-tower and the dome. Archpriest Simeon, who participated and overlooked the construction mentioned the construction ended in 1654. And the name was chosen mentioning "jigr" (heartiness), as if constructed in spite of St. Nshan adobe.

Another version says, the church was founded with financial support of the prior of the church ter Parsadan Moinov, completed in 1729 with support of Hakobjan Amatunov.

In the 1850s–80s Movses Sayatnyants, grandson of Sayat-Nova was the archpriest of the church.

== Destruction ==
In 1937-38 Jigrashen was destroyed along with 10 other Armenian churches in Tbilisi on the orders of Lavrentiy Beria. The destruction was marked by protests by the local inhabitants and curses towards the destroyers. The church wouldn't collapse and people said: "It is made with jigyar, that is why it is not being destroyed". In the end dynamite was used to blow up the church.

== See also ==
- Armenians in Tbilisi
- List of Armenian Apostolic Churches in Georgia
