= St. Sarkis Church (Tbilisi, Georgia) =

Armenian church in Tbilisi, Georgia

Saint Sarkis Church Սուրբ Սարգիս եկեղեցի

- Location within Georgia

Religion
- Affiliation: Armenian Apostolic Church

Location
- Location: District of Harpukh Sulfuric Baths; Old Tbilisi, Georgia

Architecture
- Style: Armenian
- Completed: 1737

Saint Sarkis Church (Armenian: Սուրբ Սարգիս եկեղեցի), is an Armenian church in Harpukh Sulfuric Baths district of Old Tbilisi, Georgia. It was destroyed by Lavrentiy Beria's order in the 1930s.

== Name ==
The church was located on Saint Sarkis street (curr. Griashvili) and got its name from it.

== History ==
The construction started in 1737 by Ter-Sukias, Archpriest of Norashen church. Armenian catholicos Simmeon Yerevantsi (1763–1782) thoroughly listing Armenian churches of Tbilisi mentions: "there is one more church in the fortress, called Cathedral, originally belonged to the Holy Throne, but now the fortress in being settled by Muslims who occupy the church as well. Since then the church is empty, is deprived of the parish; even the fact it belonged to the Holy Throne is being forgotten".

In 1795 Agha Mohammad Khan forces enter the city and completely destroy the district of Sulfuric Baths.

After entering Russian Empire Tbilisi became governmental center and started rapidly develop. In 1831 Manuel Kyumushkhanetsi from the Crimean Peninsula was appointed the Archpriest of the church and started complete reconstruction and restoration in short time entering list of functioning Armenian churches.

Saint Sarkis Church celebrated the feast of Saint Sarkis day after Arachavorats lent usually in January or February. On those days church bells rang, liturgy were held and the church was especially crowded. The youth in couples or alone came for blessing.

Saint Sarkis Church as the whole Tbilisi Armenian community was in a rise. The church was tall, richly decorated from inside with delicate frescoes. There was a pre-church parochial school beside. In 1910s Tirayr Ter-Hovhannisyan, famous Armenian churchman, poet, philologist and translator served as vicar here.

== Destruction ==
Saint Sarkis Church was destroyed in 1937-38 by Lavrentiy Beria order along with 11 other Armenian churches in Tbilisi. Firstly the domes were destroyed, later for the wall destruction dynamite was used, but the church was not destroyed till the end and the lower part remained, which was later reconstructed as a residential building. During the destruction two workers fell down to death.

The parochial school moved to a new address - 79 Ortachala. Its building later was used as antenatal clinic.

== See also ==
- Armenians in Tbilisi
- List of Armenian Apostolic Churches in Georgia
