= List of Armenian churches in Tbilisi =

This is the list of Armenian churches in Tbilisi, the capital of Georgia, which was the main center of the cultural life of Eastern Armenians until the early 20th century.:

Church; Armenian name Georgian name	Image	Founded	Status	Location
Cathedral of Saint George; Սուրբ Գևորգ եկեղեցի სურფგევორქი	Photo of St. Gevorg Cathedral	1251	functioning as an Armenian church	5 Samghebro Street
Lower Bethlehemi Church; Կուսանաց Սուրբ Ստեփանոս վանո ქვემო ბეთლემის ეკლესია	Photo of Lower Bethlehemi Church	1870	functioning as a Georgian church	
Ejmiatsnetsots St. Gevorg; Էջմիացնեցոծ Սուրբ Գևորգ ეჩმიაძინი	Photo of Ejmiatsin Church	18th century	functioning as an Armenian church	20 Armazi str., Avlabari district
Saint Karapet; Սուրբ Կարապետ եկեղեցի ყოვლად წმინდა (Kovlad Tsminda)	Photo of St. Karapet Church	1705	consecrated as a Georgian Orthodox church in 1992 - 1993	Elene Akhvlediani Rise, near Baratashvili bridge
Holy Virgin of Bethlehem; Բեթղեհեմի Սուրբ Աստվածածին եկեղեցի ზემო ბეთლემი (Zemo Betlemi)	Photo of Bethlehem Church	1727	consecrated as a Georgian Orthodox church in 1991	15 Betlemi Rise, Sololaki district
Saint George of Karap; Քարափի Սուրբ Գևորգ եկեղեցի კლდის უბნის წმინდა გიორგი (Kldis Ubnis Tsminda Giorgi)	Photo of Saint George of Karap Church	1753	consecrated as a Georgian Orthodox church in 1995	9 Betlemi Blind Alley, Sololaki district
Holy Cross; Վերայի Սուրբ Խաչ ելեղեցի პანტელეიმონ მკურნალი (Panteleimon Mkurnali)		1844	consecrated as a Georgian Orthodox church in 1992	12 Rcheulishvili Street, Vera Armenian Cemetery
Saint Stepanos of Kusanats; Կուսանաց Սուրբ Ստեփանոս վանք ქვედა ბეთლემი (Kveda Betlemi)		1870	consecrated as a Georgian Orthodox church in 1993	3 Betlemi Rise, Sololaki district
Chugureti St. Astvatsatsin; Չուգուրեթի Սուրբ Աստվածածին եկեղեցի წმინდა ნინო (Tsminda Nino)		1807	consecrated as a Georgian Orthodox church on January 26, 1991	32 Nino Chkheidze St., Chugureti district
Norashen Church; Սուրբ Նորաշեն եկեղեցի ნორაშენი	Photo of Norashen Church	1467	closed. Georgian priests unsuccessfully tried to take it over after independence.	41 Kote Abkhazi (Leselidze) Street
Church of the Holy Seal; Սուրբ Նշան եկեղեցի	Photo of Surb Nshan Church	1703-1711	at risk of collapse, inside burned by arsonists, reconstruction planned to start since spring 2010	Vertskhli Turn
St. Minas; Սուրբ Մինաս եկեղեցի	Photo of Surb Nshan Church		closed and derelict, full of garbage inside	A few buildings north of Baratashvili, between Lori/Loris and Gelati Streets. 41.69358, 44.81198
Tandoyants St. Astvatsatsin			closed and derelict, full of garbage inside	
Krtsanis Tsiranavor Surb Astvatsatsin		13th century	currently a residential building, there are 8 families, living in the church	
Navtlukh St. Gevorg			currently a residential building	
Mughni Church of Saint George; Մուղնո Սուրբ Գևորգ եկեղեցի წმინდა გიორგის მუღნის ეკლესია	Photo of St. George of Mughni	1756	dome collapsed in 2009, talk of reconstruction never led to rebuilding	6 Beglar Akhospireli Str.
Church of the Red Gospel; Կարմիր Ավետարան եկեղեցի	Photo of Karmir Vank	1775	ruins remain	21 Feristsvaleba Str., Avlabari district
Dzorabash St. Gevorg			demolished in 1994. In 1995 the Georgian David Tsinastsarmetkveli church was built on its place	
Vank Cathedral	Photo of Vank Cathedral	14th century	demolished in 1937-1938, except for a tall bell tower which still stands	
Saint Sargis Church; Սուրբ Սարգիս եկեղեցի		1737	demolished in 1937-1938	
Zrkinyants St. Gevorg; Զրկինյանց Սուրբ Գևորգ եկեղեցի		1717	demolished in 1937-1938	
Kamoyants St. Gevorg; Կամոյանց Սուրբ Գևորգ	Photo of Kamoyants St. Gevorg	1727 or 1788	demolished in 1937-1938	
Jigrashen Avetyats Church; Ջիգրաշեն Ավետյաց եկեղեցի	Photo of Jigrashen Avetyats Church	1624 or 1729	demolished in 1937-1938	
Kuky St. Astvatsatin			demolished in 1937-1938	
Saint Gregory the Illuminator Church; Սուրբ Գրիգոր Լուսավորիչ եկեղեցի			demolished in 1937-1938	
Hreshtakapetats; Հրեշտակապետած			demolished in 1937-1938	
Katoghike St. Astvatsatsin; Կաթողիկե Սուրբ Աստվածածին եկեղեցի			demolished in 1937-1938	

== See also ==
- Armenians in Tbilisi
