= Zrkinyants Saint Gevork Church =

Church building in Old Tbilisi, Georgia

Zrkinyants Saint Gevork Church Զրկինյանց Սուրբ Գևորգ Եկեղեցի

- Location within Georgia

Religion
- Affiliation: Armenian Apostolic Church

Location
- Location: Old Tbilisi, Georgia
- Coordinates: 42°N 45°E

Architecture
- Style: Armenian
- Completed: 1717

Zrkinyants Saint Gevork Church (Armenian: Զրկինյանց Սուրբ Գևորգ Եկեղեցի; Russian: Церковь Зркинянц Св. Геворг) was an Armenian Apostolic church in Tbilisi, Georgia. It was destroyed in 1937-38 by order of Lavrentiy Beria along with 10 other churches in Tbilisi.

== History ==
Zrkinyants Saint Gevork Church was located in Griboedov street near Academy of Arts of Georgia. The construction note was placed on the southern portico. A scientist-traveler rewrote the date - 1713, what meets the date mentions in the registry of the Armenian churches of Tbilisi. The text is the following: "I, sun of Zurab makhtesi Petros and my brothers - Hovsep, Sahak and David, built this new crypt - church of Saint Gevork in our memory and memory of our parents. During reign of Vakhtang. In summer of 1162 (=1713)".

In 1713 Vakhtang VI was in Iran and the higher Georgian authorities through the Embassy of S.S. Orbeliani tried to return him to motherland. Armenians as well tried to support those efforts, and the letter of Elia Karnetsi dated March 13, 1715 proves it. In the letter Vakhtang was called a king, although actually he wasn't. The problem of future ruler was actively discussed in the society, and that note shows Armenian position in the issue.

This note shows that the date is incorrect, moreover the constructor of the church belonged not the family of Kamazovs (who were mentioned during renovation of Tbilisi cathedral church), but Zrkinovs.

== Destruction ==
In 1937-38 Zrkinyants Saint Gevork Church was destroyed along with 10 other Armenian churches of Tbilisi by Lavrentiy Beria order.

== See also ==
- Armenians in Tbilisi
- List of Armenian churches in Georgia
