= Chugureti St. Astvatsatsin =

Church in Tbilisi, Georgia

Chugureti St. Astvatsatsin Church Չուղուրեթի Սբ. Աստվածածին եկեղեցի
- Chugureti St. Astvatsatsin in the 1910s

- Location within Georgia

Religion
- Affiliation: Armenian Apostolic Church

Location
- Location: 32 Nino Chkheidze St., Chugureti; Old Tbilisi, Georgia
- Coordinates: 41.70109°N 44.8091°E

Architecture
- Style: Armenian
- Completed: start of the 19th century

Chugureti St. Astvatsatsin Church (Armenian: Չուղուրեթի Սբ. Աստվածածին եկեղեցի; Russian: Церковь Чугурети Ст. Богородицы) is an Armenian church in Chugureti district of Old Tbilisi, Georgia.

== History ==
Chugureti St. Astvatsatsin church is not mentioned in early Tbilisi sources and documentation. It is shown in the 1825 city plan, as well as in a list of Armenian churches in Tbilisi written on 16 December 1831. Historians prefer to date its construction to the start of the 19th century. According to Irakliy II gift deed, "in 1795 the state village Chugureti with the local inhabitants and lands given to Karapet and Georgiy, children of Sargis-agha (Amatuni) for life tenancy and now order ashigh-agha-basha Tamaz Orbelyanov to give the village for life tenancy".

Amatuni family members, who came from city of Nakhichevan coming to this "god saved city", as Hovhannes Amatuni writes in construction note of Jigrashen Avetyats church, did their best in sacred buildings construction "having resources gifted by God". They increased the population, which caused an increase in the number of sacred buildings too. In the start of the 19th century one more Armenian church was built in Chugureti - Chugureti St. Gevorg church, which was constructed by Yerevantsi Papen and Yakov Kocharov in 1807.

There was an inscription engraved near the baptismal of Chugureti St. Astvatsatsin and on the fence, which was later destroyed. The inscription said: "Remember, O Lord, the soul of the late George Miro Mirimanyants, 27 of the month of March, 1857". This is a unique example when epigraphs are completely identical.

During the Soviet Union the church did not function, but escaped destruction along with 11 other Armenian churches destroyed by Lavrentiy Beria's order in 1930s. It served as a warehouse.

After the Soviet collapse the church was given to the Georgian Church and now functions as a Georgian Orthodox church. It was consecrated on January 26, 1991.

== See also ==
- Armenians in Tbilisi
- List of Armenian Apostolic Churches in Georgia
