= St. Astvatsatsin Monastery =

St. Astvatsatsin Monastery may refer to several ruins in the Nakhchivan Autonomous Republic of Azerbaijan:

- St. Astvatsatsin Monastery (Bist)
- St. Astvatsatsin Monastery (Channab)
- St. Astvatsatsin Monastery (Kyrna)
- St. Astvatsatsin Monastery (Norashen)
- St. Astvatsatsin Monastery (Shurud)

== See also ==
- Mets Astvatsatsin Monastery (Yukhari Aylis)
- St. Astvatsatsin Church (disambiguation)
