= Surb Nshan Church, Tbilisi =

Church building in Tbilisi, Georgia

Church of the Holy Seal Սուրբ Նշան եկեղեցի
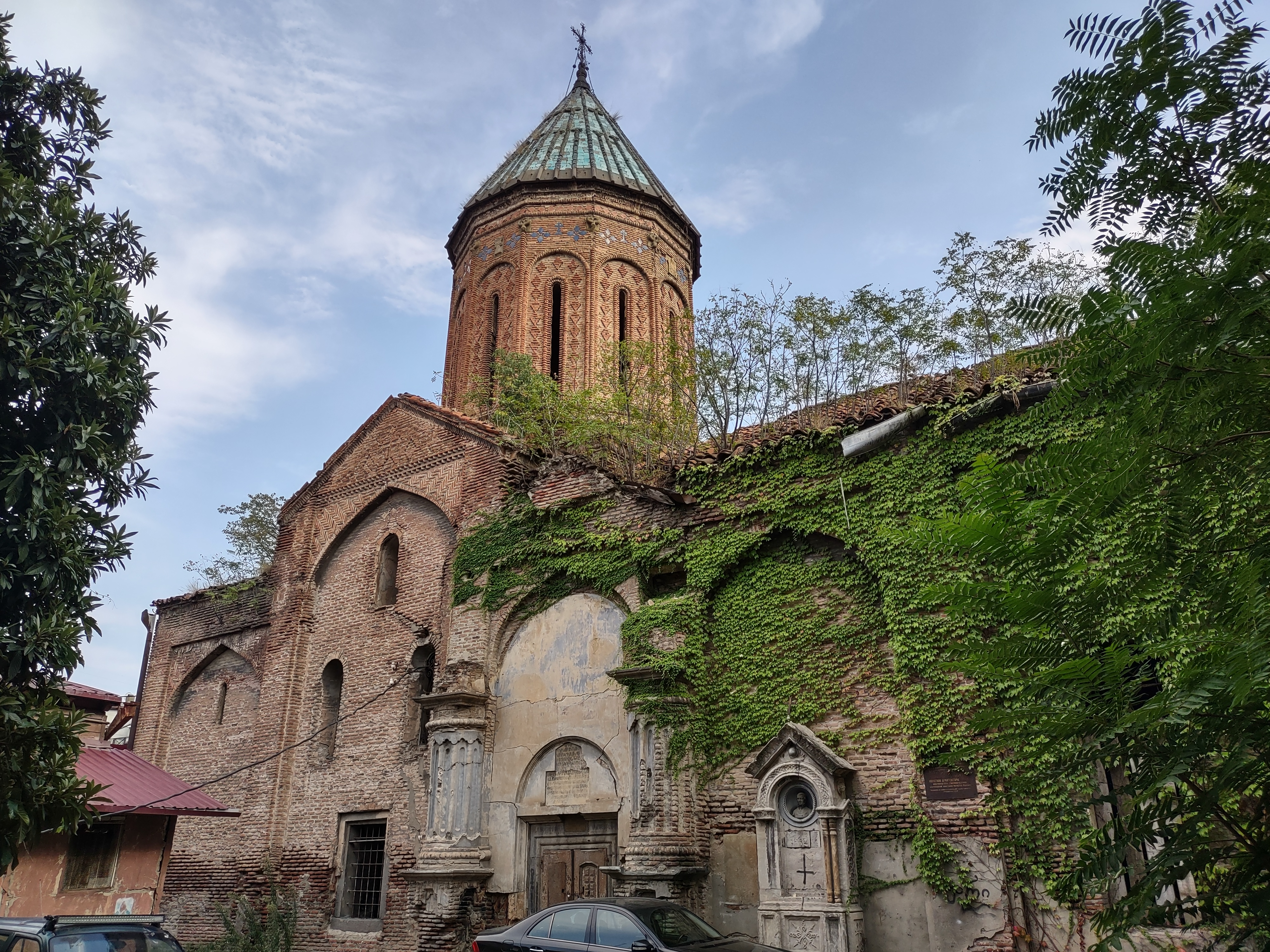

Religion
- Affiliation: Armenian Apostolic Church
- Ecclesiastical or organisational status: Cathedral
- Status: restricted access

Location
- Location: Tbilisi, Georgia
- Interactive map of Church of the Holy Seal; Սուրբ Նշան եկեղեցի
- Coordinates: 41.694309°N 44.804694°E

Architecture
- Style: Armenian
- Groundbreaking: 1703
- Completed: 1711 (reconstructed in 1780)

The Church of the Holy Seal (Armenian: Սուրբ Նշան եկեղեցի, Surb Nshan yekeghetsi, Georgian: სურფნიშანი, Sourfnishani) is an 18th-century Armenian church in Old Tbilisi, Georgia. It was built between 1703 and 1711, and reconstructed in 1780.

== Current state ==
The church lies dilapidated after it was 2002 partially destroyed by arson.

== Gallery ==
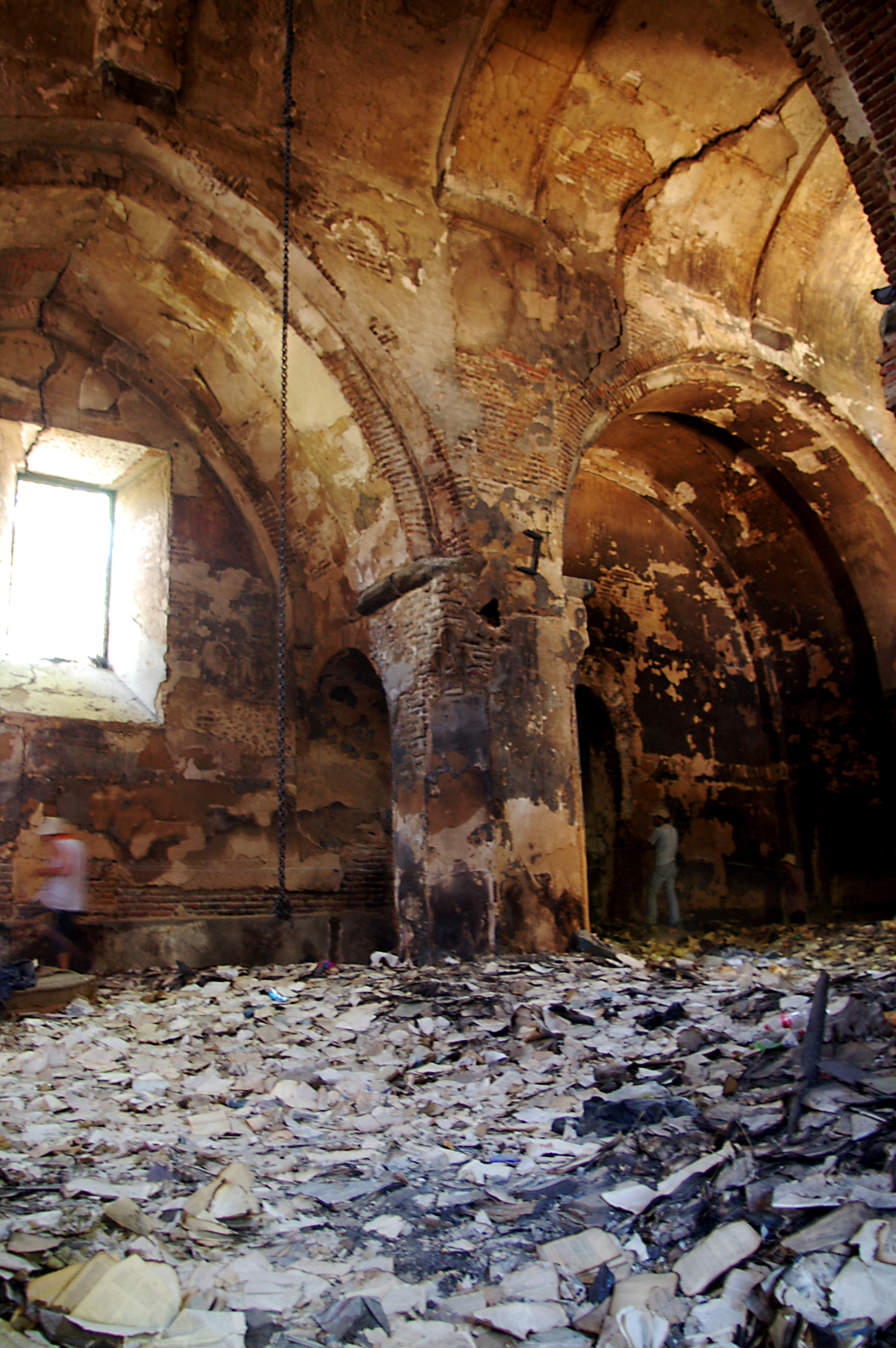
The interior of the church after the arson fire

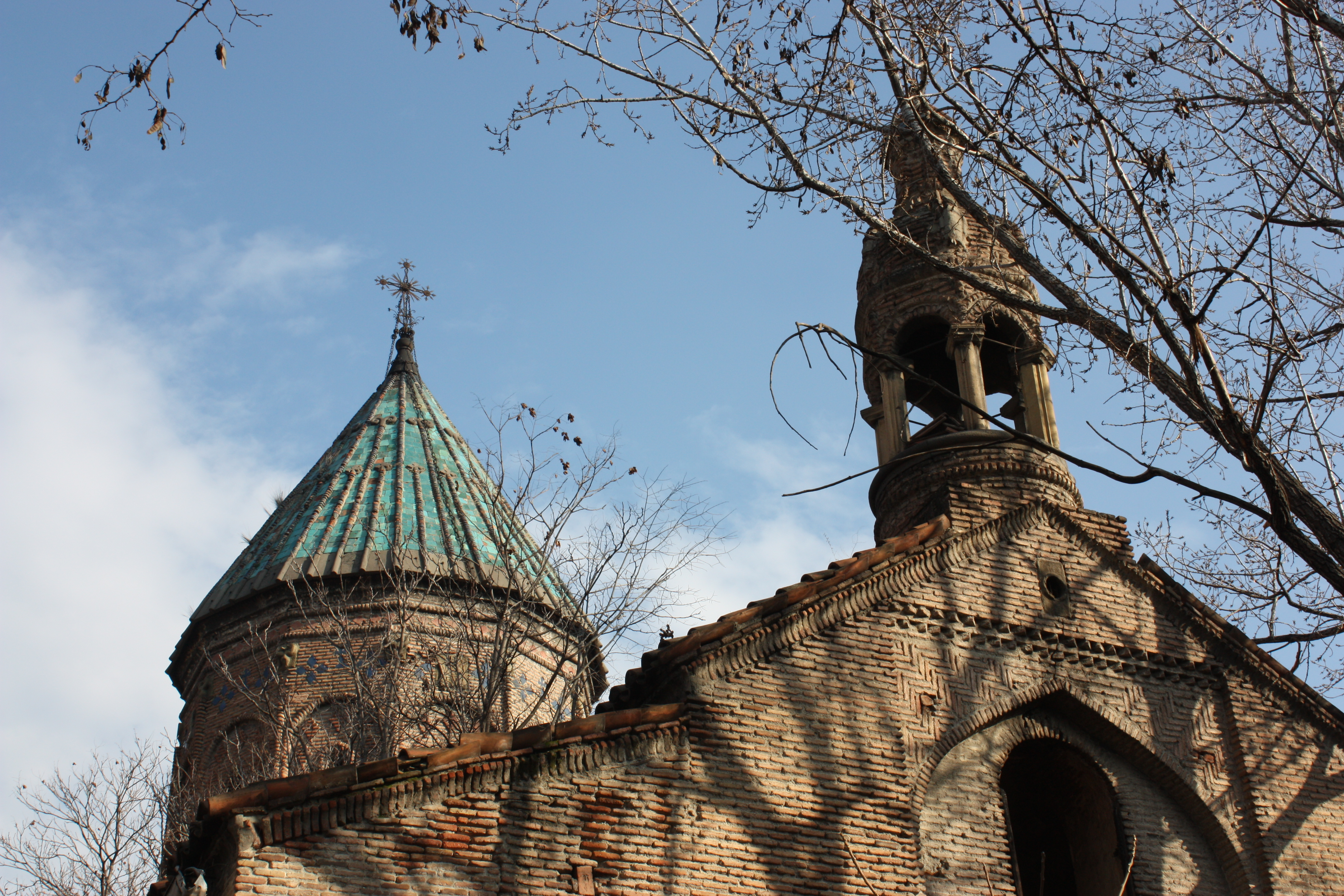
Dome and belfry

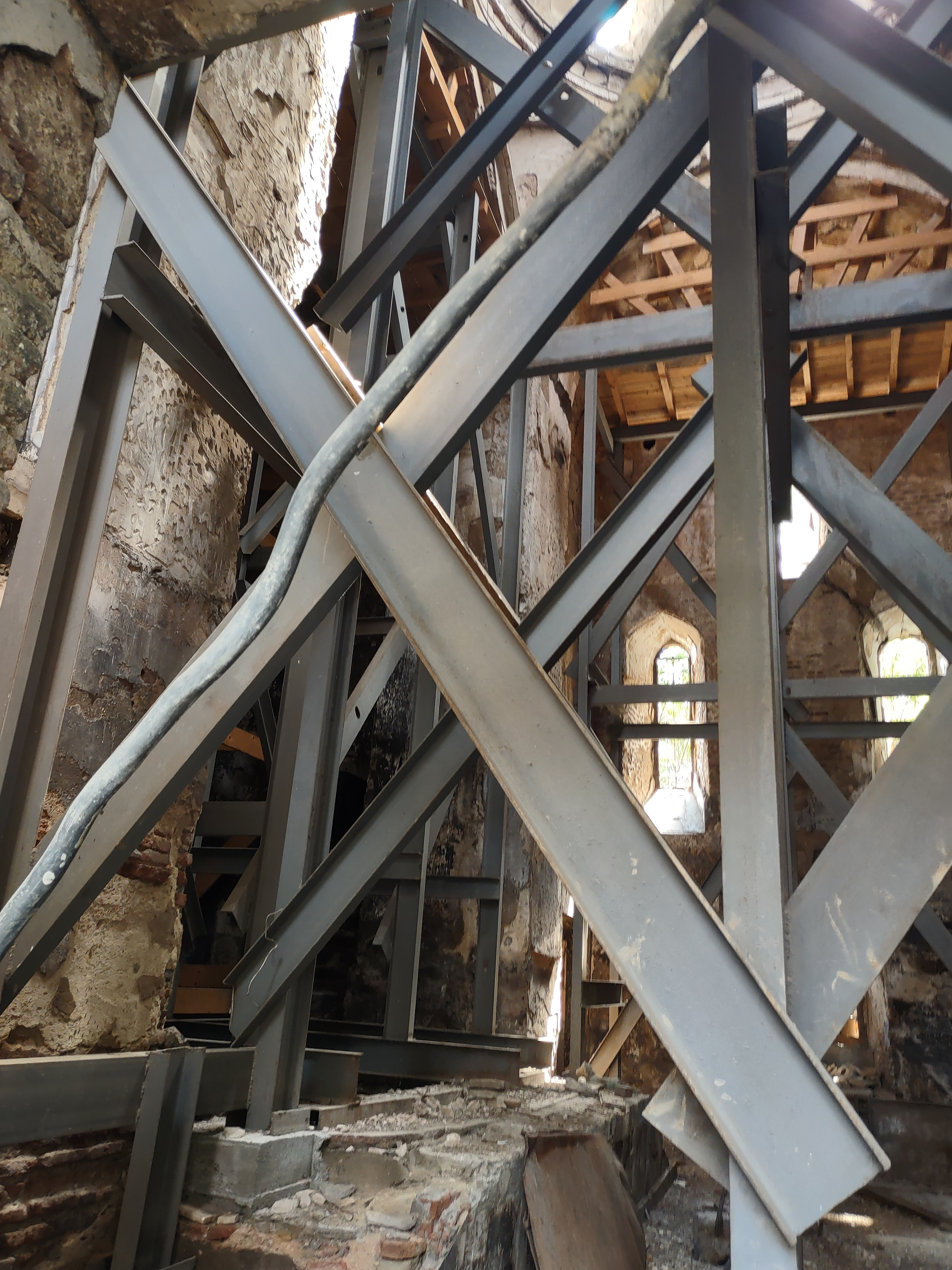
Current condition of interior, with steel beam reinforcements

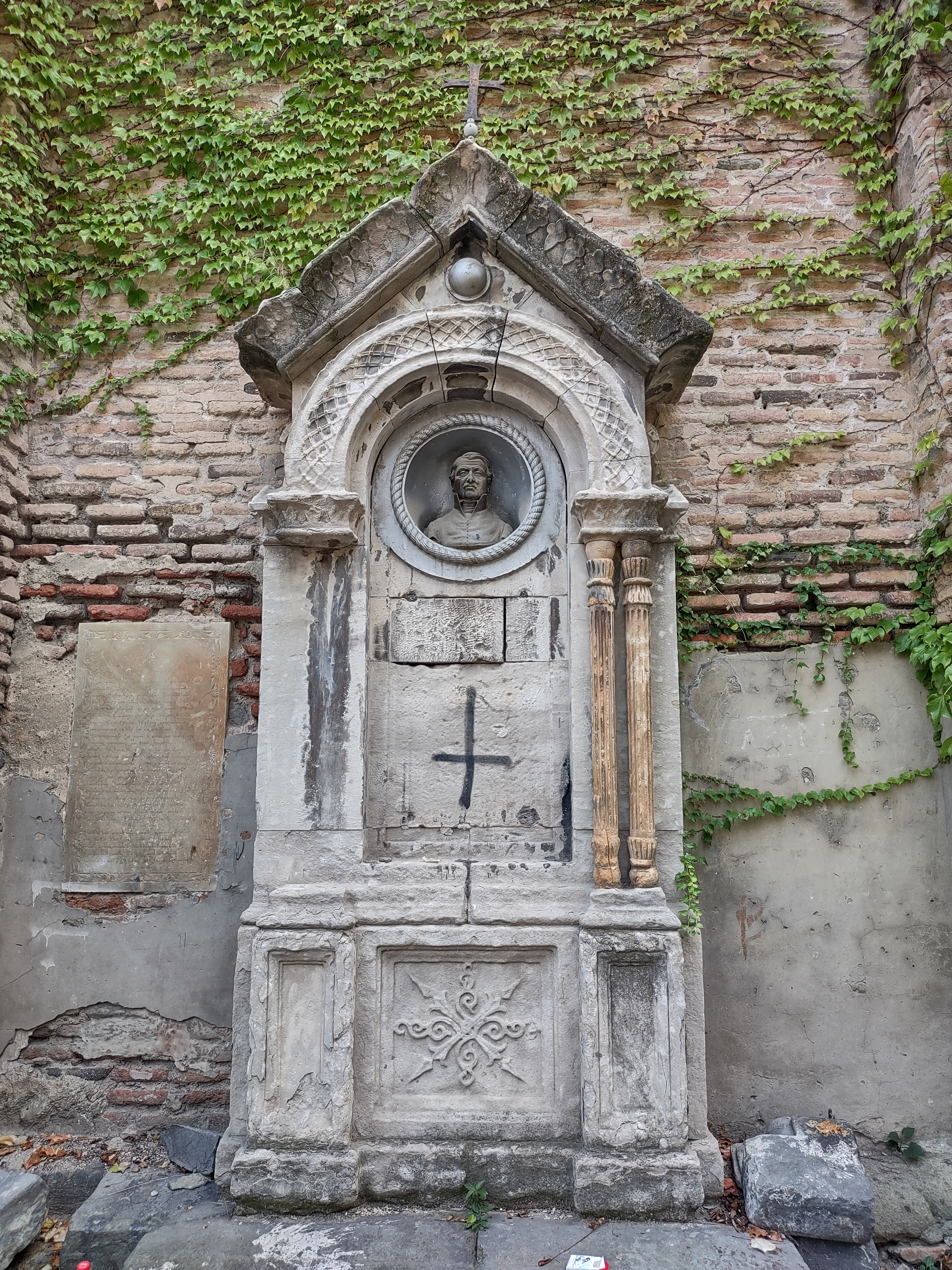
Vandalized memorial

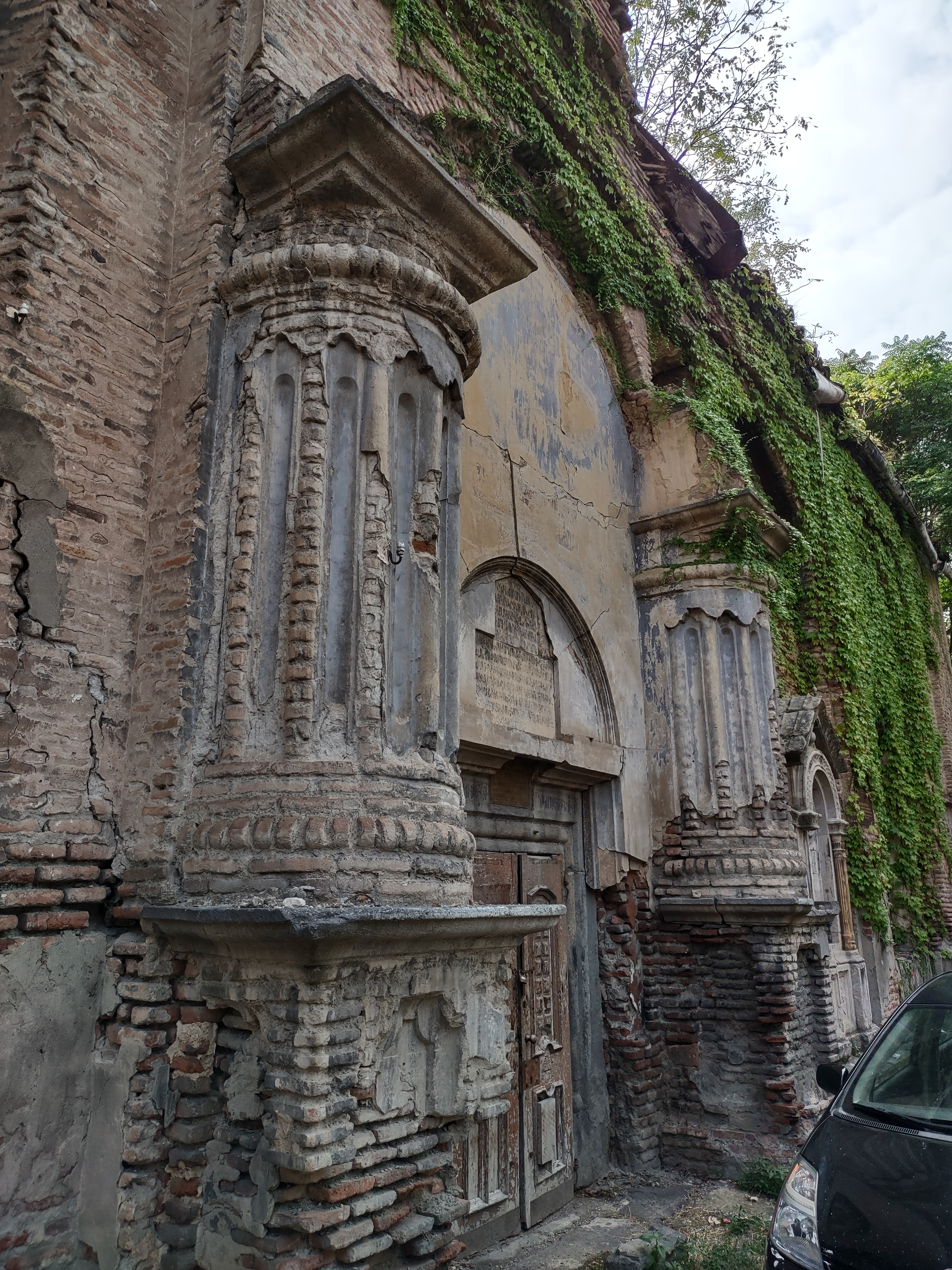
Main entrance

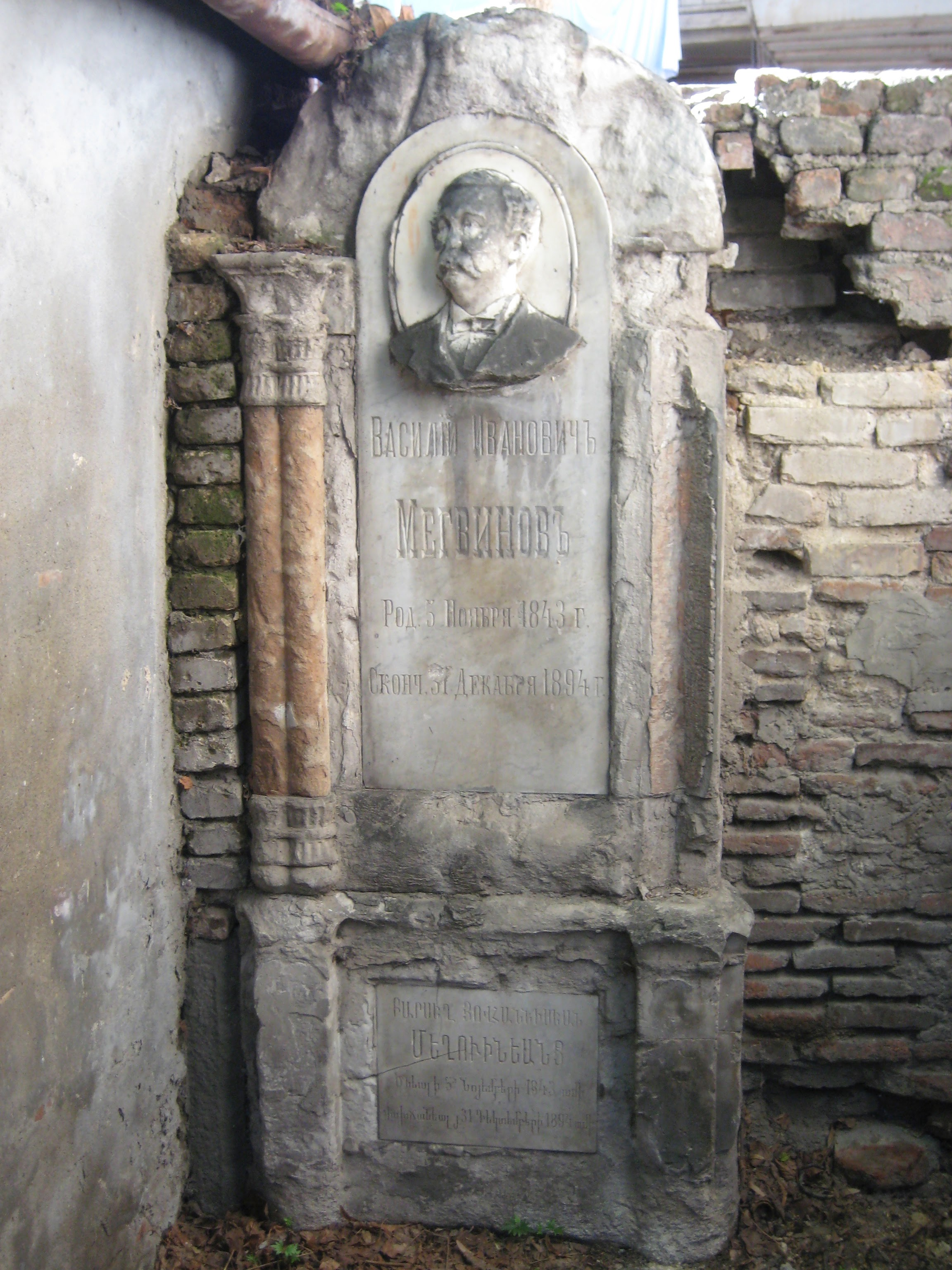
Memorial that disappeared

== See also ==
- Armenian churches of Tbilisi
- Armenians in Georgia
