= Krtsanis Tsiranavor Surp Astvatsatsin =

Armenian church in Old Tbilisi, Georgia

Geghardavank – Krnanis Tsiranavor Surp Astvatsatsin Գեղարդավանք – Կրծանիս Ծիրանավոր Սուրբ Աստվածածին
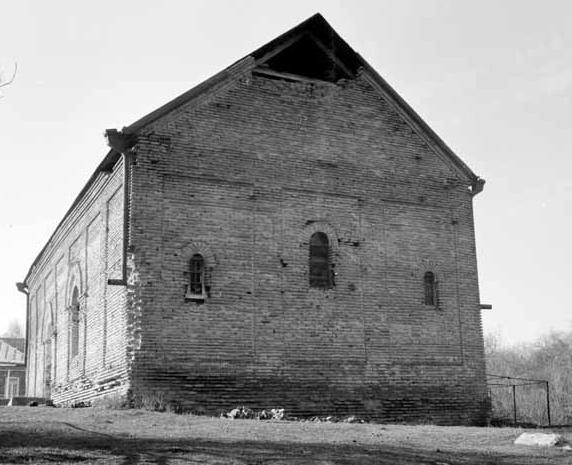

- Location within Georgia

Religion
- Affiliation: Armenian Apostolic Church

Location
- Location: Krtsanisi, Old Tbilisi, Georgia
- Coordinates: 42°N 45°E

Architecture
- Style: Armenian
- Completed: 13th century

Geghardavank or Krtsanis Tsiranavor Surp Astvatsatsin (Armenian: Գեղարդավանք – Կրծանիսի Ծիրանավոր Սուրբ Աստվածածին; Russian: Гехардаванк – Крцанис Циранавор Св. Богородицы) is a 13th-century Armenian church in Tbilisi, Georgia. It was founded in the 13th century. Currently it is not functioning as a church.

== History ==
Among Tbilisi Armenians Krtsanis Surp Astvatsatsin church was also called Tsiranavor and Geghardavank. First was an epithet referring to the Holy Virgin and second refers to the great spear, which was brought here and stayed for some time. Krtsanisi village was close to Tbilisi, which greatly contributed its economic development.

According to Sargis Jalalyants, current citizens moved to Krtsanisi from the town-fortress Samshvilde. If it took place indeed, it must have been in second half of the 13th century – first half of the 14th century, because the document dated from 1392 mentions the village as belonging to Mtskheta Catholicos House having "merchant of the city". By that time the village had a number of Armenian population based on the fact there was already an Armenian church in it. Armenian manuscript colophon dated 1436 says: "This [book] is written in Armenian summer of 885 [1436 AD] in the country of Georgia closest to capital Tpkhis [Tbilisi] village Krtsanis, in the shade of Cathedral of the Holy Virgin". Here catholicoses of Armenia, Albania are mentioned (Constantine and Matheos), Archimandrite (the leader of the Armenians of Georgia) Iezekiel and Georgian king Aleksander I.

According to the writer it was "hard and painful times" when "evil truthless Shahrukh and the country has caused great destruction. Based on words of Tovmas Metsopetsi in the 15th century Armenian population of Ararat Valley had to leave and moved to Georgia to Beshken Orbelyan, who treated them well. The second stream of emigrants is supposed to arrive then. Tovmas Metsopetsi himself was a refugee from Gandzak, who after return from Jerusalem pilgrimages moved to his home town to see his brother and relatives. Together with him "a number of caravans" of refugees moved, who in Agstev had been ruined by "cavalry of Jagataians". The local inhabitants met the newcomers, "Christians came forward and covered our nakedness", so they arrived the place of the new settlement, where Tovmas started copying of the manuscript received from Tbilisi Holy Virgin Cathedral monk Sargis. In Krtsanis church he had his brothers beside – monk Jordan and priest Stepanos Krtsanetsi.

In XVI-XVII the village population rapidly decreased and the church was almost ruined. It was reconstructed in 1778 again. The Register of Armenian churches of Tiflis Krtsanis Surp Astvatsatsin was mentioned number 33 with the following description: "Built funded by city population in Armenian summer of 1227 [1778] and renewed by daughter Anna of Amiran Sulents from Krtsanis funded by city budget".

The only known note on the church walls is found on the side baptismal: in the center part the scene of baptism is shown with the following note in the sides: "This baptismal is in memory of Gregoriy Mamulyan in Geghardavank of Tsiranavor. 1861"

== Current status ==
The church is rebuilt to a residential house. Currently no talks about church history reopening is held neither by Armenian nor by Georgian church.

== See also ==
- Armenians in Tbilisi
- List of Armenian Apostolic Churches in Georgia
