= Vank Monastery, Tbilisi =

Vank Monastery
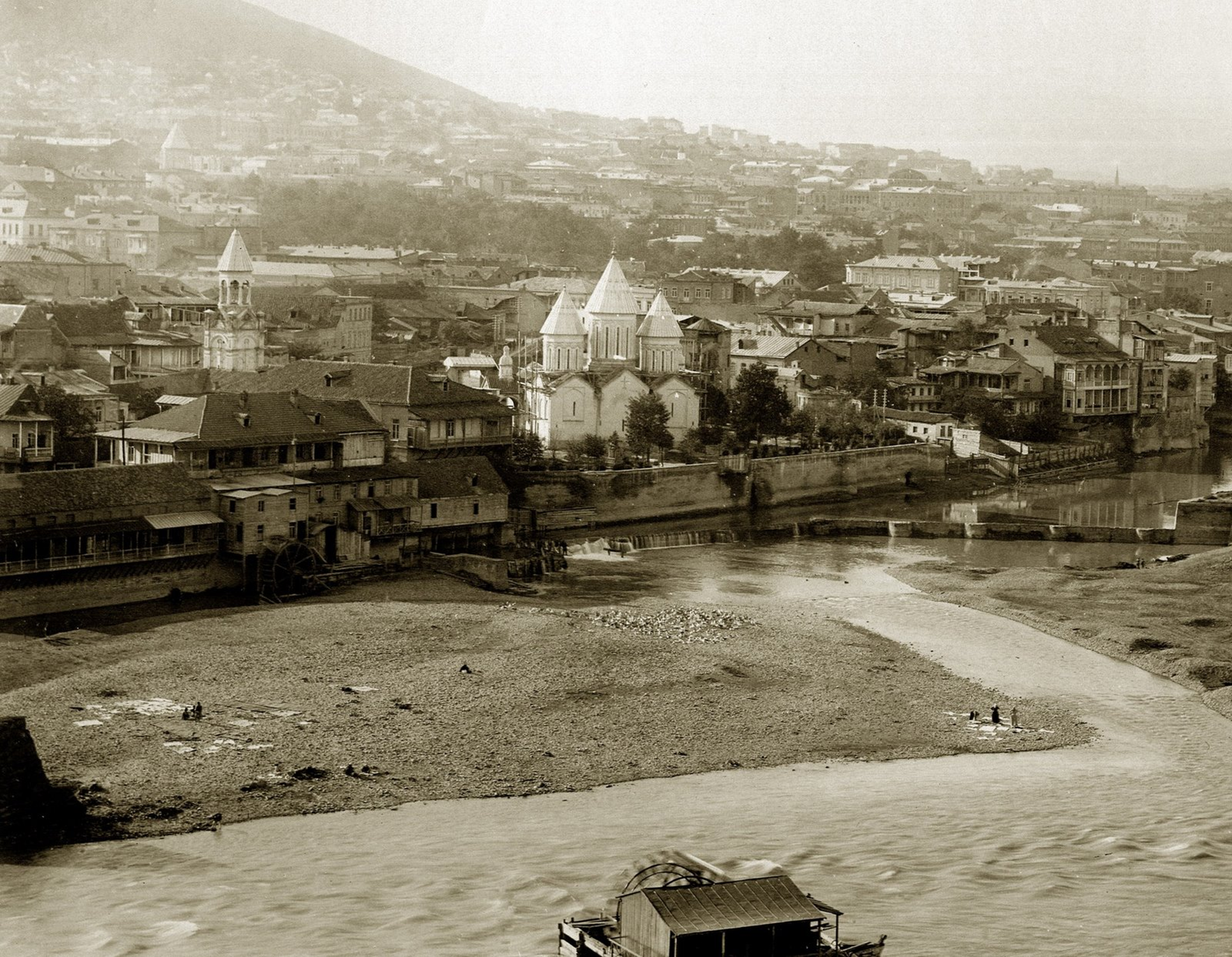
- The cathedral in 1901

- Location within Georgia

Religion
- Affiliation: Armenian Apostolic Church
- Ecclesiastical or organisational status: Cathedral
- Status: Completely destroyed (1930)

Location
- Location: Tbilisi, Georgia
- Coordinates: 41.696328°N 44.806723°E

Architecture
- Type: Triple-nave basilica with three cupolas
- Style: Armenian
- Completed: 14th century (restored in 1480 and 1789)
- Dome: 3

The Church of the Holy Mother of God of the Mens Monastery, also known as Pashavank (Armenian: Պաշավանք) was an Armenian Apostolic church in the city of Tbilisi located on the right bank of the Kura River. It was destroyed by the Bolsheviks in 1938.

== History ==
Pashavank was founded in the 14th century by the grandsons of Baron Umek who arrived in Tbilisi from Karin (Erzerum) in the 13th century. The structure was restored in 1480, and more extensively in 1789. It was seat of the Armenian archbishop in 1914. Hrants was the largest church in Tbilisi until it was demolished in 1930 by Soviet authorities.

John Buchan Telfer wrote in his 1876 book "the principal church of the Armenians is the Pasha Vank, a handsome building within a high-walled enclosure; an inscription below a window records that it was erected by Ghoulants Khodja Giorgi, in the reign of Vakhtang VI, 1719-24; the Georgians have given the name of Pasha Vank, because they say it was erected by a Turkish pasha who had embraced the Christian faith."

== Architecture ==
The church of S. Astvatsatsin was very original in design. Its exterior was constructed of solid brickwork, and was a triple-nave (with equal naves) basilica in plan. There were barrel vaults under saddle roofs and three cupolas above the east spans, the central one being the tallest whereas the other two were slightly smaller. The drums were dodecagonal, with twelve long windows located under blind arches topped by horizontal molding and a row of decorative bricks. Conical umbrella style domes surmounted the drums. The interior was painted by Hovnatan Hovnatanian in 1789.

== Gallery ==
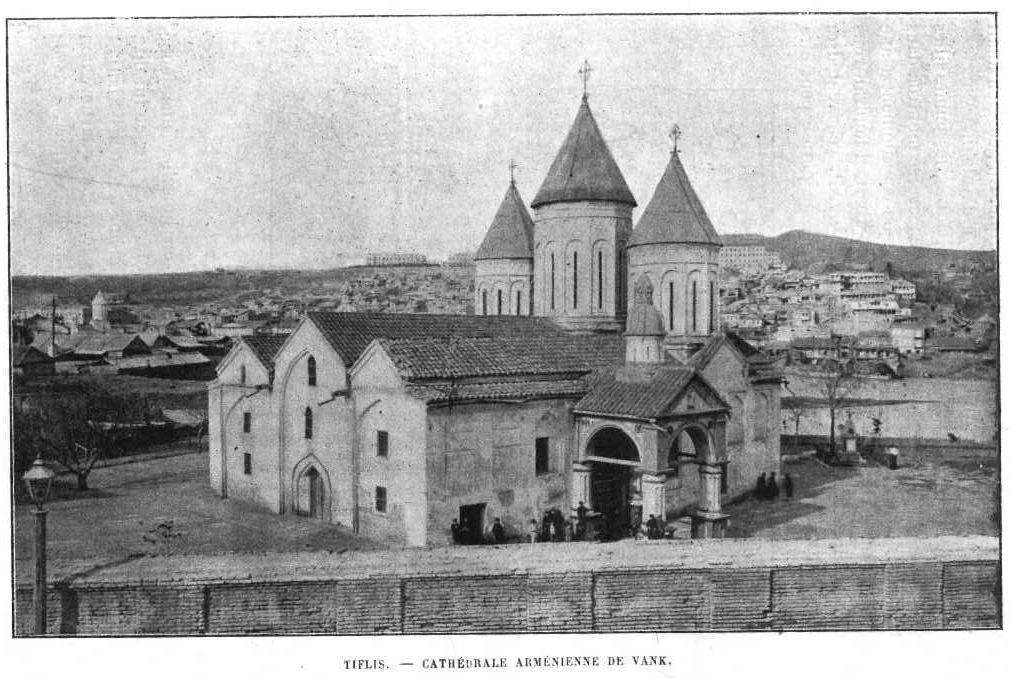
The Church of the Holy Mother of God, 1900.

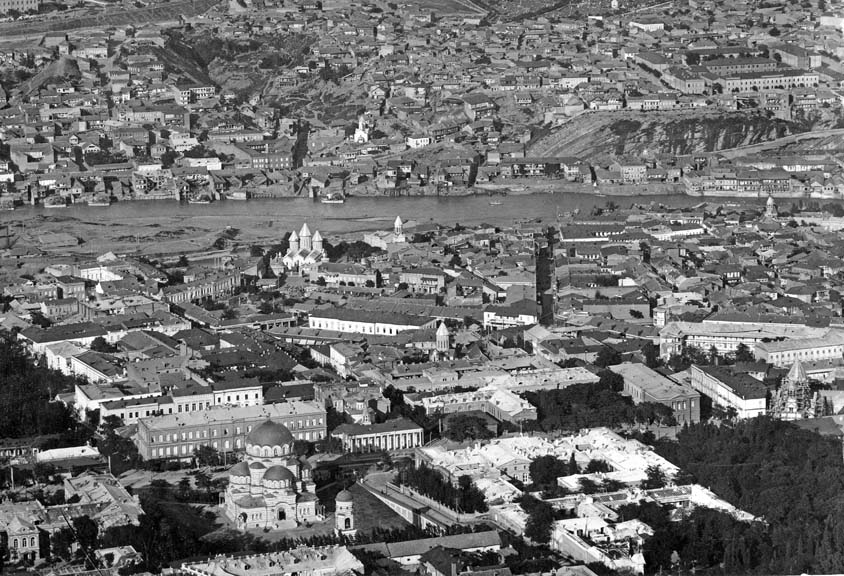
View of downtown Tbilisi, 1900 (the church of S. Astvatsatsin is to the left of center)

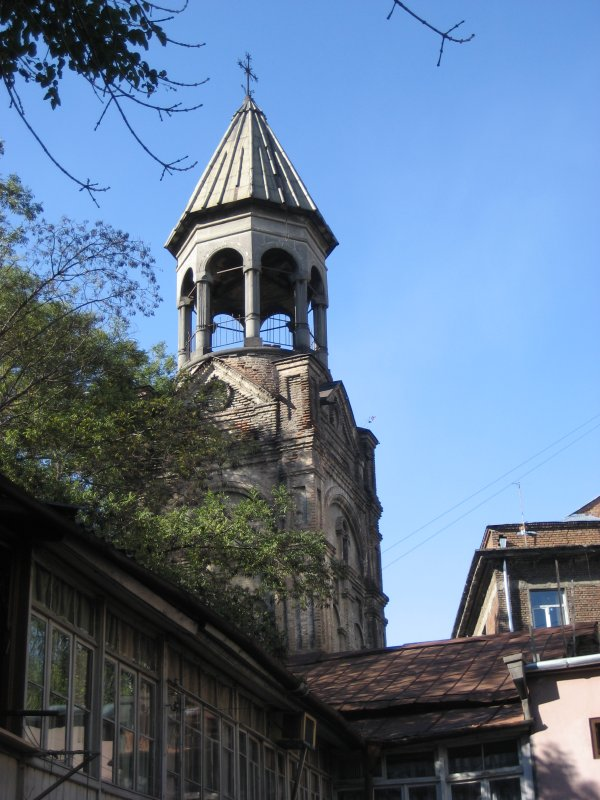
Bell-tower at 3 Atoneli Street is all that remains of the complex

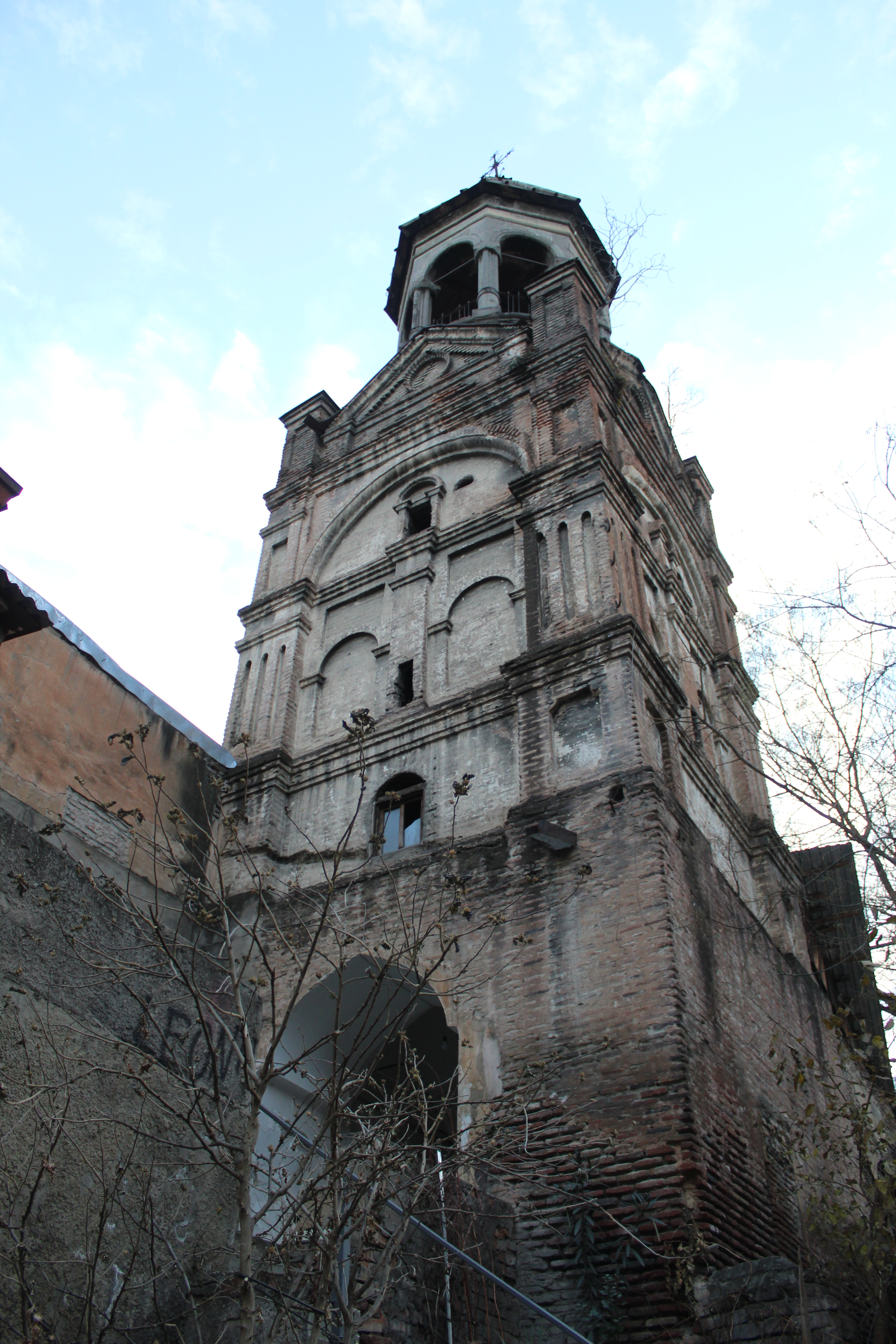

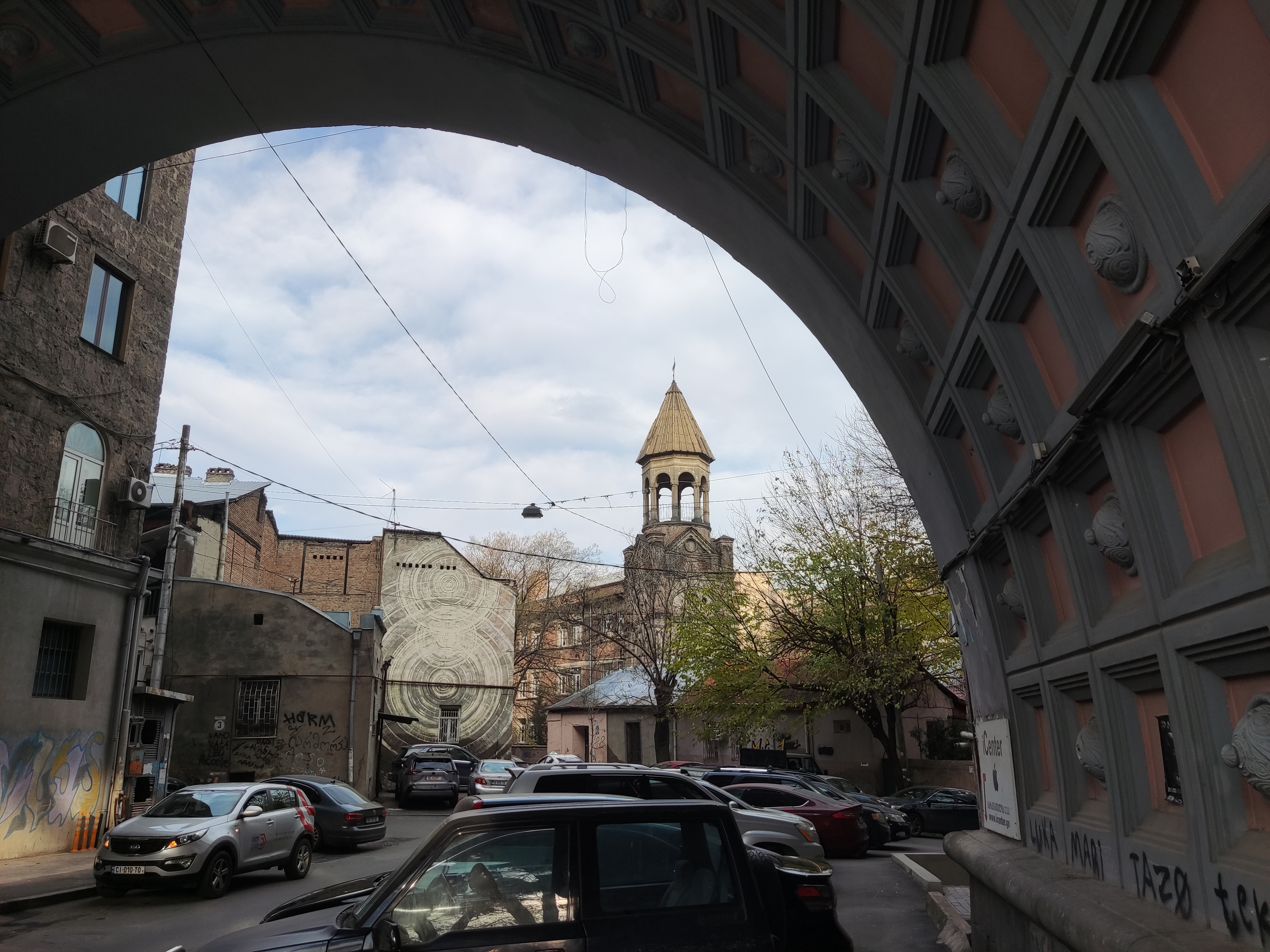

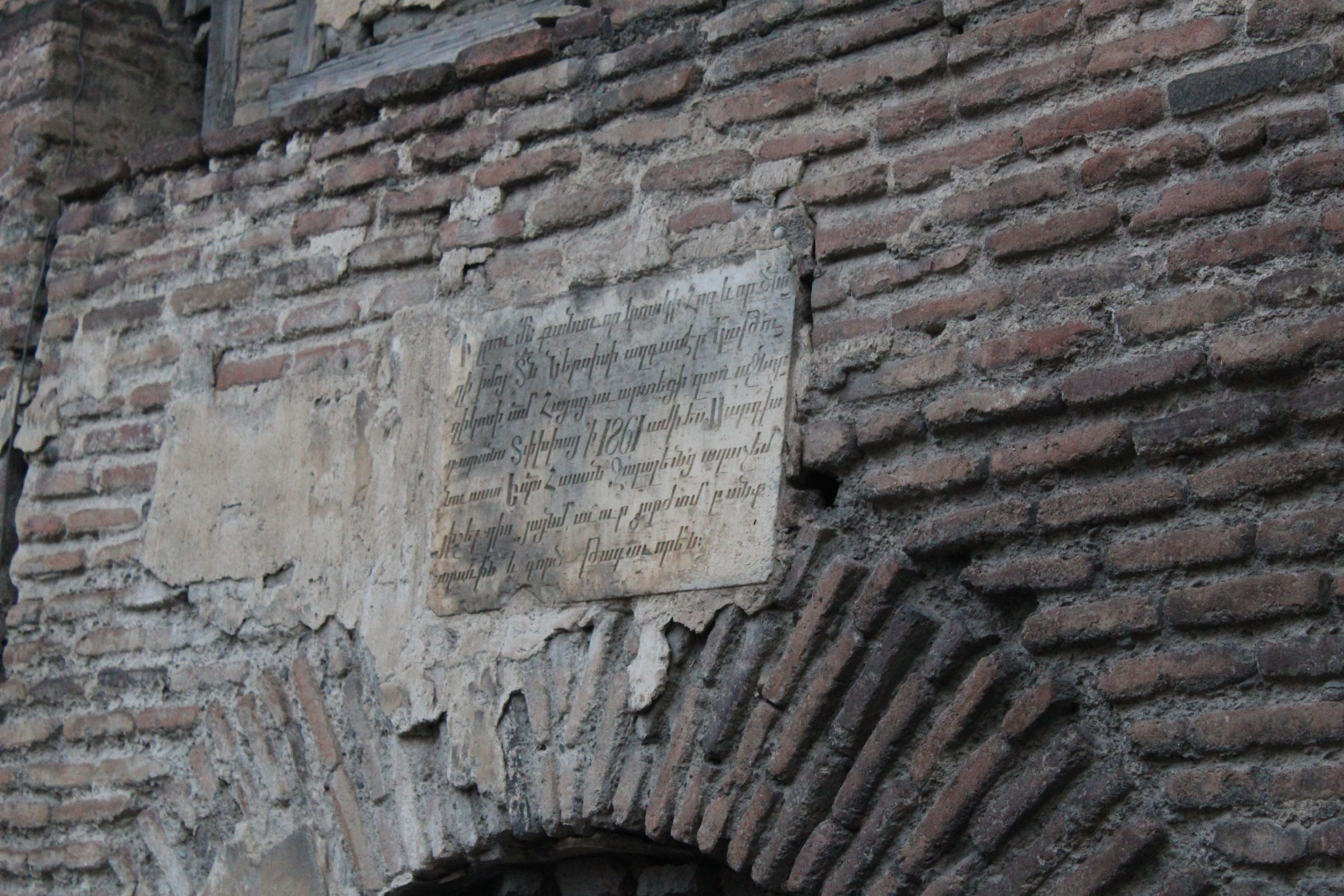
Bell tower inscription

== See also ==
- Armenians in Georgia
- List of Armenian churches in Tbilisi
