= Kamoyants Saint Gevork Church =

Armenian Apostolic church in Tbilisi, Georgia

Kamoyants Saint Gevork Church Կամոյանց Սուրբ Գևորգ Եկեղեցի
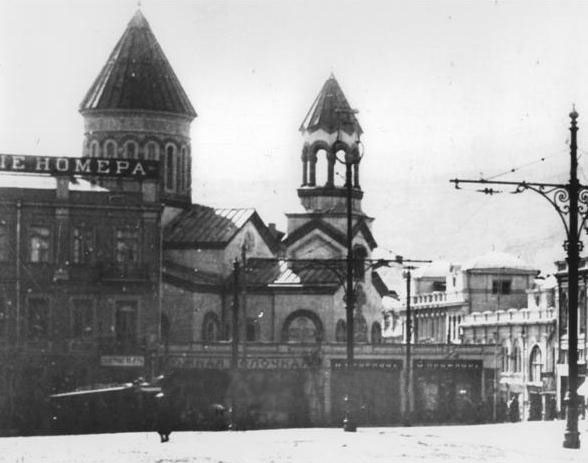

- Location within Georgia

Religion
- Affiliation: Armenian Apostolic Church

Location
- Location: Old Tbilisi, Georgia
- Coordinates: 42°N 45°E

Architecture
- Style: Armenian
- Completed: 1727 or 1788

Kamoyants Saint Gevork Church (Armenian: Կամոյանց Սուրբ Գևորգ Եկեղեցի; Russian: Церковь Камоянц Св. Геворг) was an Armenian Apostolic church in Tbilisi, Georgia. It was destroyed in 1937-38 by order of Lavrentiy Beria along with 10 other churches in Tbilisi.

== History ==
Kamoyants Saint Gevork Church was situated in front of current "Freedom square" metro station in Gareubani district, which was called "Calos ubani" or "Tapitagh" in 19th century literature. The church was quite big and built of red brick dome church. According to Armenian registry of the Armenian churches of Tbilisi, the place was presented by Bejan Bek and the church was built by Gabriel Kamoyan. Later was renovated by Karapet Khotakovyants. Some historical sources date the church construction to 1727, while in literature it was mentioned as built in 1788.

The priest Gabriel was one of the activists of Armenian liberation movement led by Hovsep Emin. He was planned to be the messenger of Hovsep Emin and Irakliy II. A memorial book of the catholicosate says: "Outside of the city of Tiflis there was a church called Kamoyan, the priests and parishioners could not pray there every time because of fear of godless lezgins. then the highest priest of the church Ter Gabriel planned a new church inside the city". The note is made in 1765, accordingly the church was constructed several decades before that date. The newly built church was already inside the city.

== Destruction ==
In 1937-38 Kamoyants Saint Gevork Church was destroyed along with 10 other Armenian churches of Tbilisi by Lavrentiy Beria order.

== See also ==
- Armenians in Tbilisi
- List of Armenian Apostolic Churches in Georgia
