= Saint Gregory the Illuminator Church, Tbilisi =

Destroyed Armenian church in Georgia

Saint Gregory the Illuminator Church Սուրբ Գրիգոր Լուսավորիչ եկեղեցի
- Location within Georgia

Religion
- Affiliation: Armenian Apostolic Church

Location
- Location: Ketevan Tsamebuli Avenue (formerly Kakheti Street); Old Tbilisi, Georgia
- Coordinates: 42°N 45°E

Architecture
- Style: Armenian

Saint Gregory the Illuminator Church (Armenian: Սուրբ Գրիգոր Լուսավորիչ եկեղեցի; Russian: Церковь св. Григория Просветителя) is an Armenian church in Ketevan Tsamebuli Avenue (formerly Kakheti Street) in Tbilisi, Georgia. St. Gregory the Illuminator church was destroyed in 1937-38 by Lavrentiy Beria order along with 11 other Armenian churches in Tbilisi.

== See also ==
- Armenians in Tbilisi
- List of Armenian churches in Georgia
