= St. Gregory the Great Church, Danbury =

Coordinates: 41°25′40.48″N 73°26′25.46″W

St. Gregory the Great Church
- St. Gregory the Great Church
- Location: 85 Great Plain Road; Danbury, Connecticut
- Country: United States
- Denomination: Roman Catholic

Architecture
- Architect: Chido S. Liccardi

Administration
- Province: Hartford
- Diocese: Bridgeport

Clergy
- Bishop: Most Rev. Frank Caggiano

St. Gregory the Great is a Roman Catholic church in Danbury, Connecticut, United States, part of the Diocese of Bridgeport.

== History ==
The Parish was established in 1960, forming from the St. Joseph Parish. One year prior, the Diocese of Bridgeport had purchased 10 acres of land in the Great Plain district for parochial use. At the time, the land was known as Oak Ridge Farm. On the property was a 13 room colonial house and a large barn, which would be converted into the church. A school was built on the property in 1963.

By the early 1980s, the Parish decided to replace the aging barn with an ultra modern dove-shaped church, designed by architect Chido S. Liccardi.
