= Etchmiadzin (disambiguation) =

Etchmiadzin or Ejmiatsin may refer to:

- Vagharshapat, Armenia, a city in Armenia also known as Etchmiadzin (or Ejmiatsin, Echmiatsin or Echmiadzin)
  - Etchmiadzin Cathedral, Mother Cathedral of Holy Etchmiadzin of the Armenian Apostolic Church
  - Mother See of Holy Etchmiadzin, of the Armenian Apostolic Church, located in the city
  - Etchmiadzin, monthly publication of Mother See of Holy Etchmiadzin
- Echmiadzin Gospels, a 10th-century Armenian Gospel Book
- Ejmiatsin Church, Tbilisi, an 18th-century Armenian church
- Etchmiadzin uezd, a county of the Erivan Governorate of the Russian Empire
