= Church of the Red Gospel, Tbilisi =

Ruined 18th-century church in Tbilisi, Georgia

Church of the Red Gospel Կարմիր Ավետարան եկեղեցի
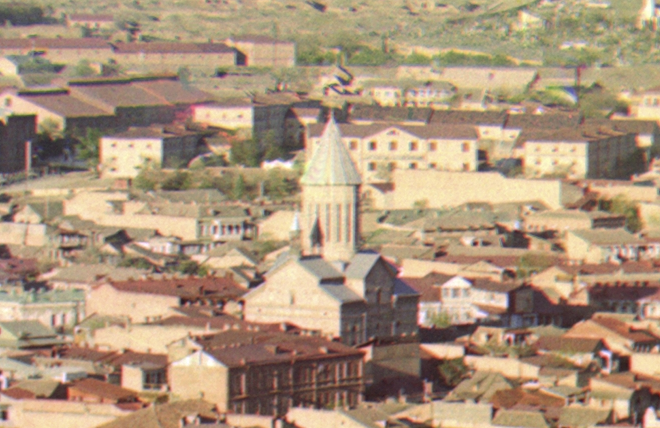
- Church of the Red Gospel in the early 1900s

Religion
- Affiliation: Armenian Apostolic Church
- Ecclesiastical or organisational status: Cathedral
- Status: ruined (1989)

Location
- Location: Avlabari district, Tbilisi, Georgia
- Interactive map of Church of the Red Gospel; Կարմիր Ավետարան եկեղեցի
- Coordinates: 41.691014°N 44.814692°E

Architecture
- Style: Armenian
- Completed: 1775
- Dome height (outer): 40 meters

The Church of the Red Gospel (Armenian: Կարմիր Ավետարան եկեղեցի, Karmir Avetaran Yekeghetsi; Armenian: Կարմիր վանք, Karmir Vank) or Shamkoretsots Sourb Astvatsatsin Church (Armenian: Շամքորեցոց Սուրբ Աստվածածին եկեղեցի, meaning Shamkor Inhabitants' Holy Mother of God Church) is a ruined 18th-century Armenian church in the Avlabari district of Old Tbilisi, Tbilisi, Georgia.

It was built in 1735 or 1775 or 1808, and renovated during the 19th century. According to Armenian sources, on April 13, 1989, the church was "blown up" or "destroyed". Georgian officials deny that it was blown up, and ascribed its destruction to the intensity of an earthquake that had struck Tbilisi a day before. At 40 meters, it was the tallest Armenian church in Tbilisi. Today it stands in ruins, with its cupola gone.

== Gallery ==
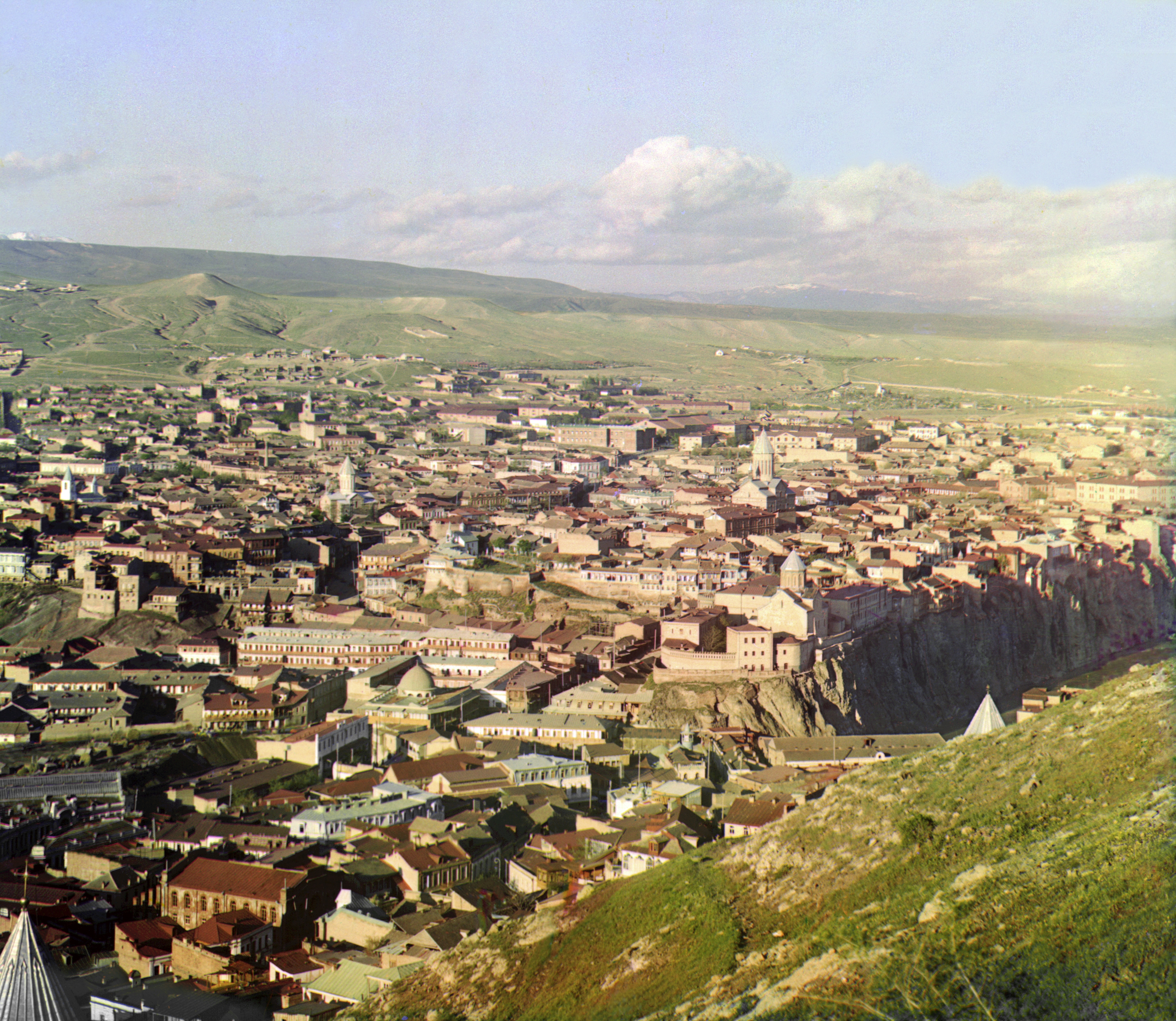
View of the church in historic Tbilisi

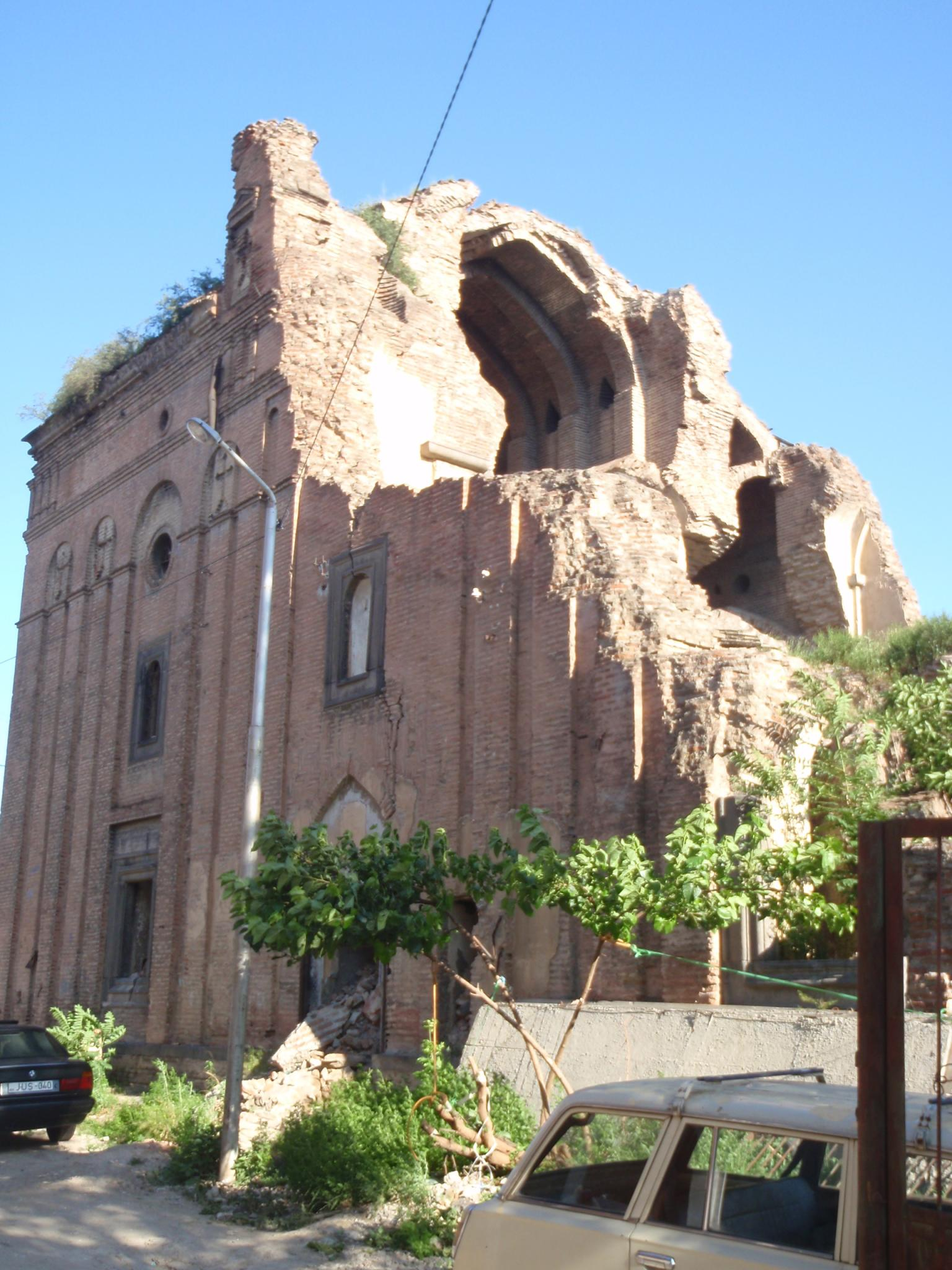
The ruins of the church after 1989

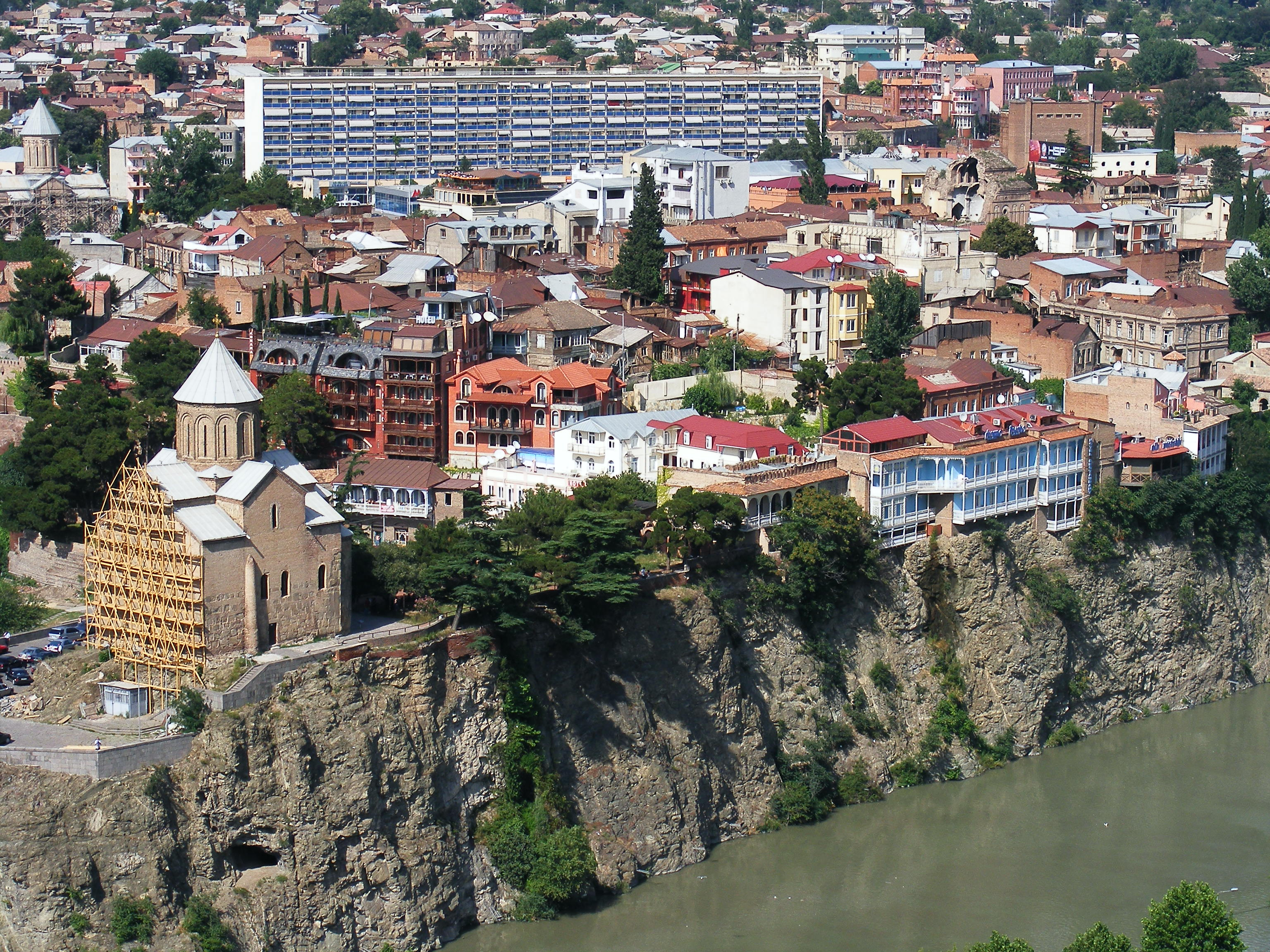
Location of the church (upper right) within the Avlabari district

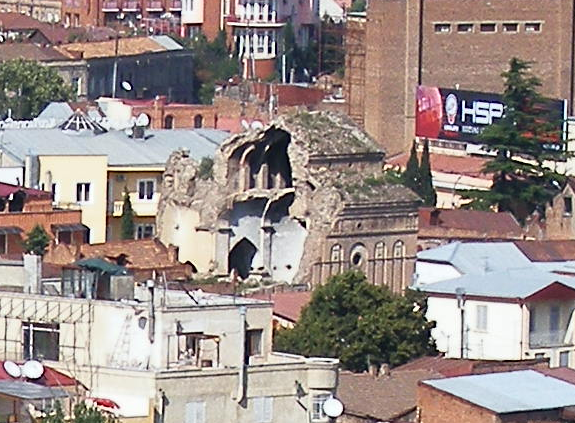
Closeup of the ruins

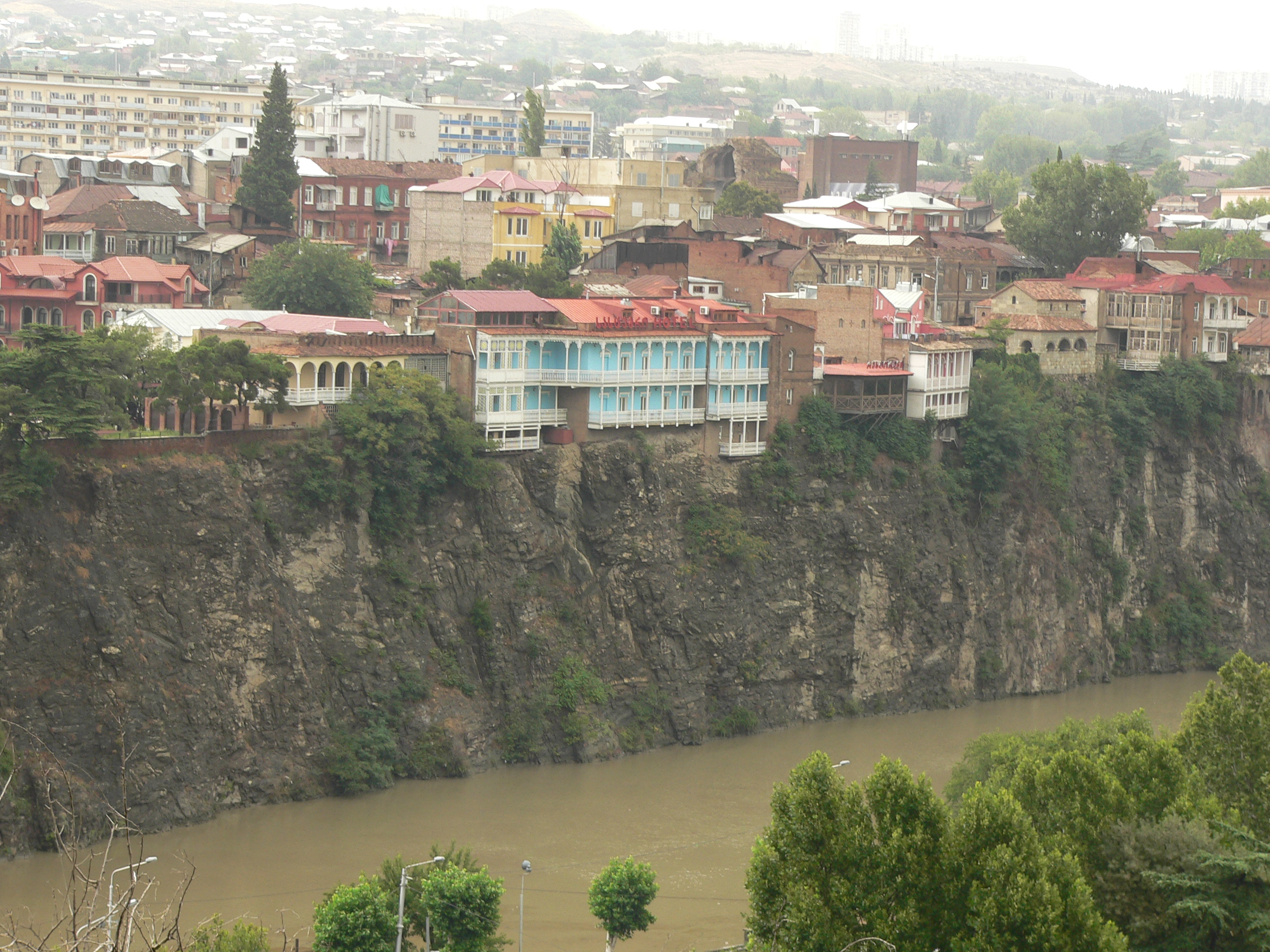
View of the ruins (top center right) from Narikala fortress

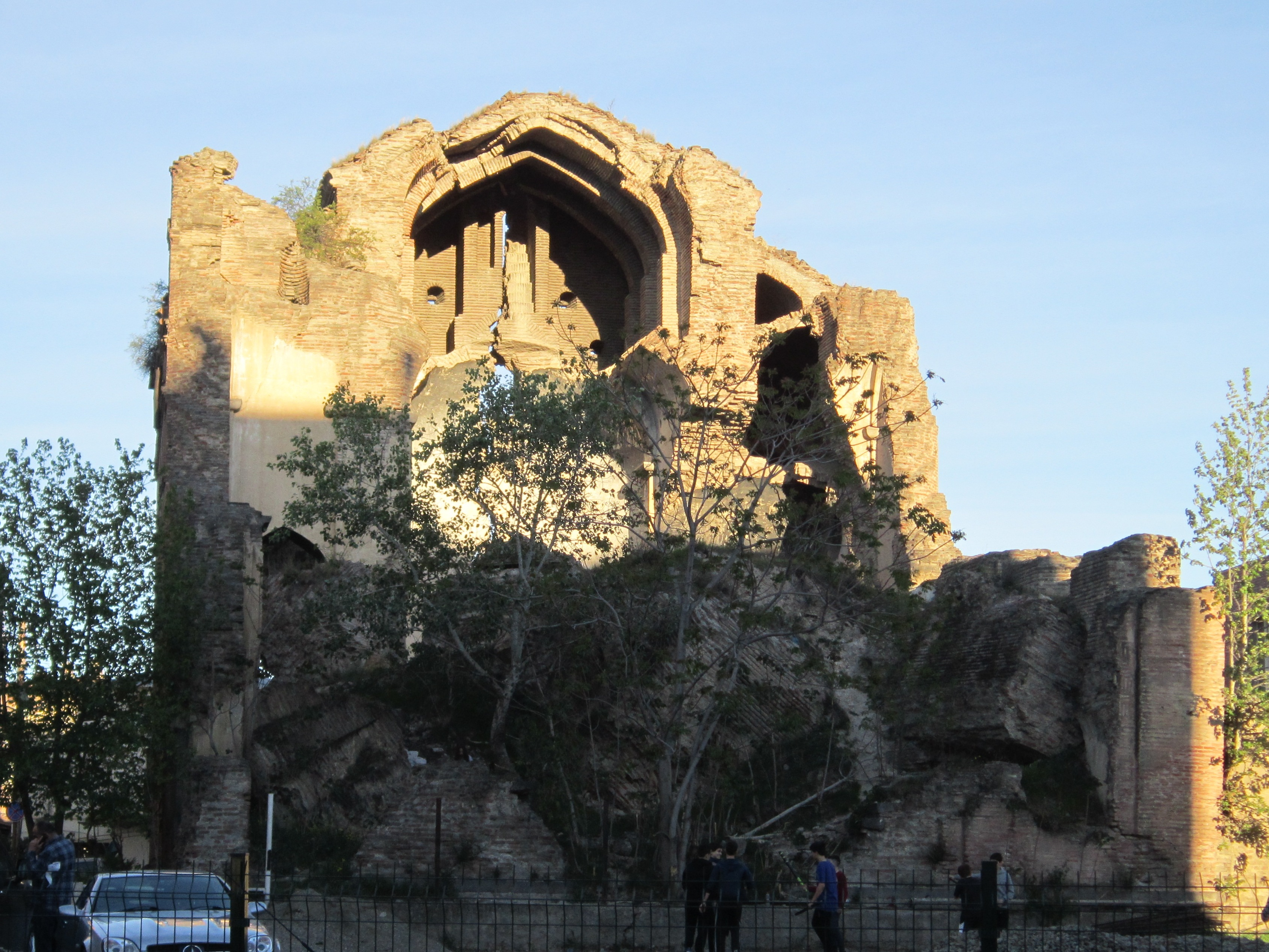
The ruins in 2016

== See also ==
- Armenian churches of Tbilisi
- Ejmiatsin Church, a nearby Armenian church
- Armenians in Georgia

== Bibliography ==
- Karapetyan, Samvel (1998), The State Policy of Georgia and the Monuments of Armenian Culture (1988-1998) (in Armenian) (1st ed.), Yerevan: Research on Armenian Architecture, pp. IX–XI, ISBN 5-8080-0144-7 (photographic documentation, newspaper articles)
