= Avlabari =

Avlabari ავლაბარი
- Neighborhood of Isani District
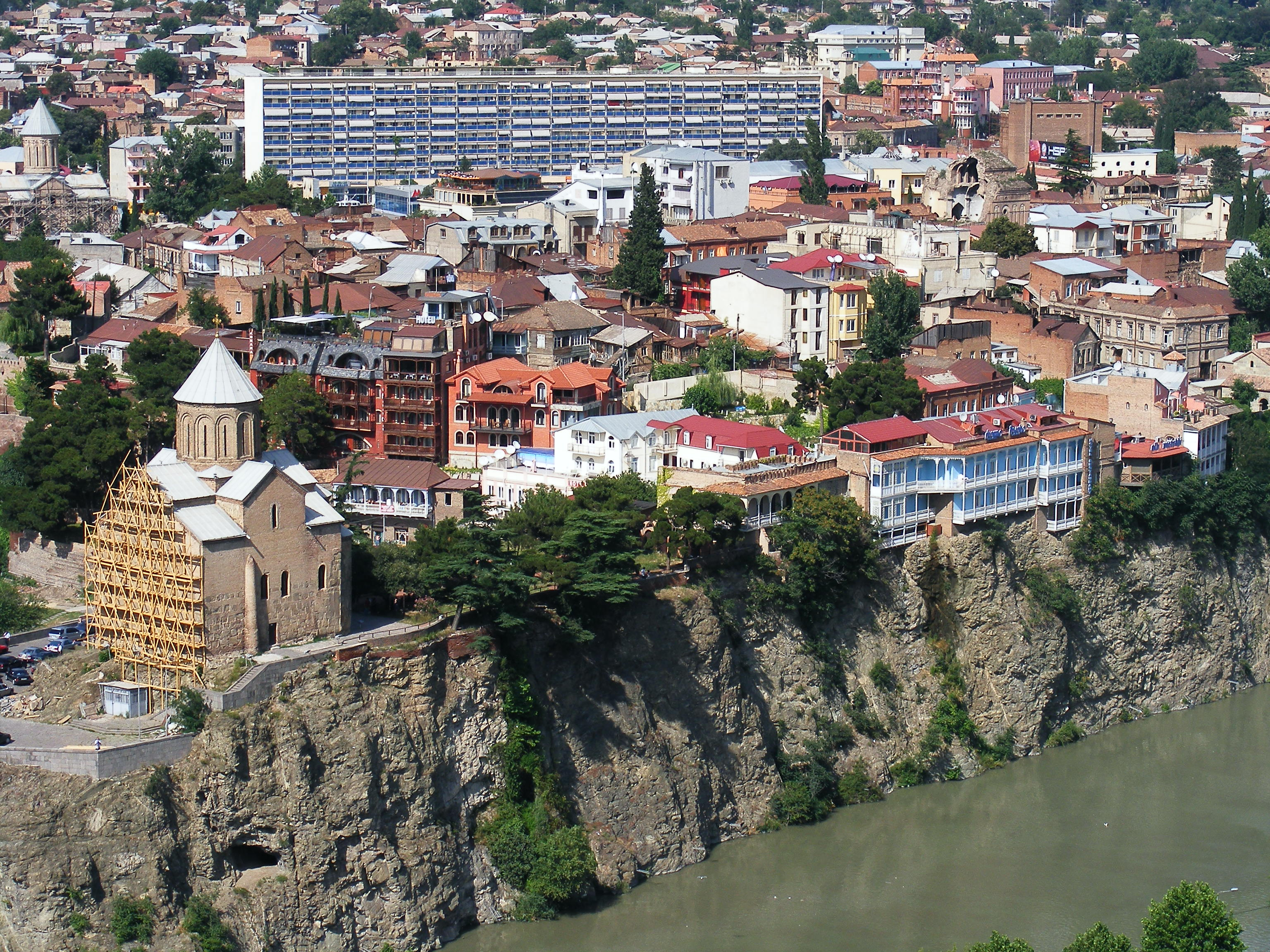

- Flag

- Location within Tbilisi
- Coordinates: 41°41′35″N 44°48′57″E
- Country: Georgia
- City: Tbilisi
- Raioni: Old Tbilisi
- Time zone: UTC+4 (Georgian Time)

Avlabari (Georgian: ავლაბარი Avlabari, Armenian: Հավլաբար Havlabar) is a neighborhood of Old Tbilisi on the left bank (east side) of the Mtkvari River. The 11th-13th century chronicles mention it as Isani, which is now one of the larger municipal regions of Tbilisi. Nowadays one of the upcoming hip neighborhoods of the city, Avlabari is being extensively gentrified.

== The Armenian community ==
Avlabari (Armenian: Հավլաբար Havlabar) was long known as the center of Armenian life of Tbilisi. The Armenian Pantheon of Tbilisi is located in Avlabari. Until recently Avlabari was populated heavily by Armenians, but recently their number have diminished.

== Churches ==
The churches in the Avlabari district include:

- The Holy Trinity Cathedral of Tbilisi - the third-tallest Eastern Orthodox cathedral in the world
- The Metekhi Church - the oldest church in Avlabari
- Church of the Red Gospel, Tbilisi, a ruined 18th century Armenian Apostolic Church
- Ejmiatsin Church, Tbilisi, an 18th-century Armenian church near Avlabari Square

== Transportation ==
The neighborhood is served by the Avlabari metro station.

== Notable residents ==
- Arshak Ter-Gukasov, Russian-Armenian general (1819-1881)
- Nikol Aghbalian, Armenian public figure and historian (1875-1947)

== Gallery ==
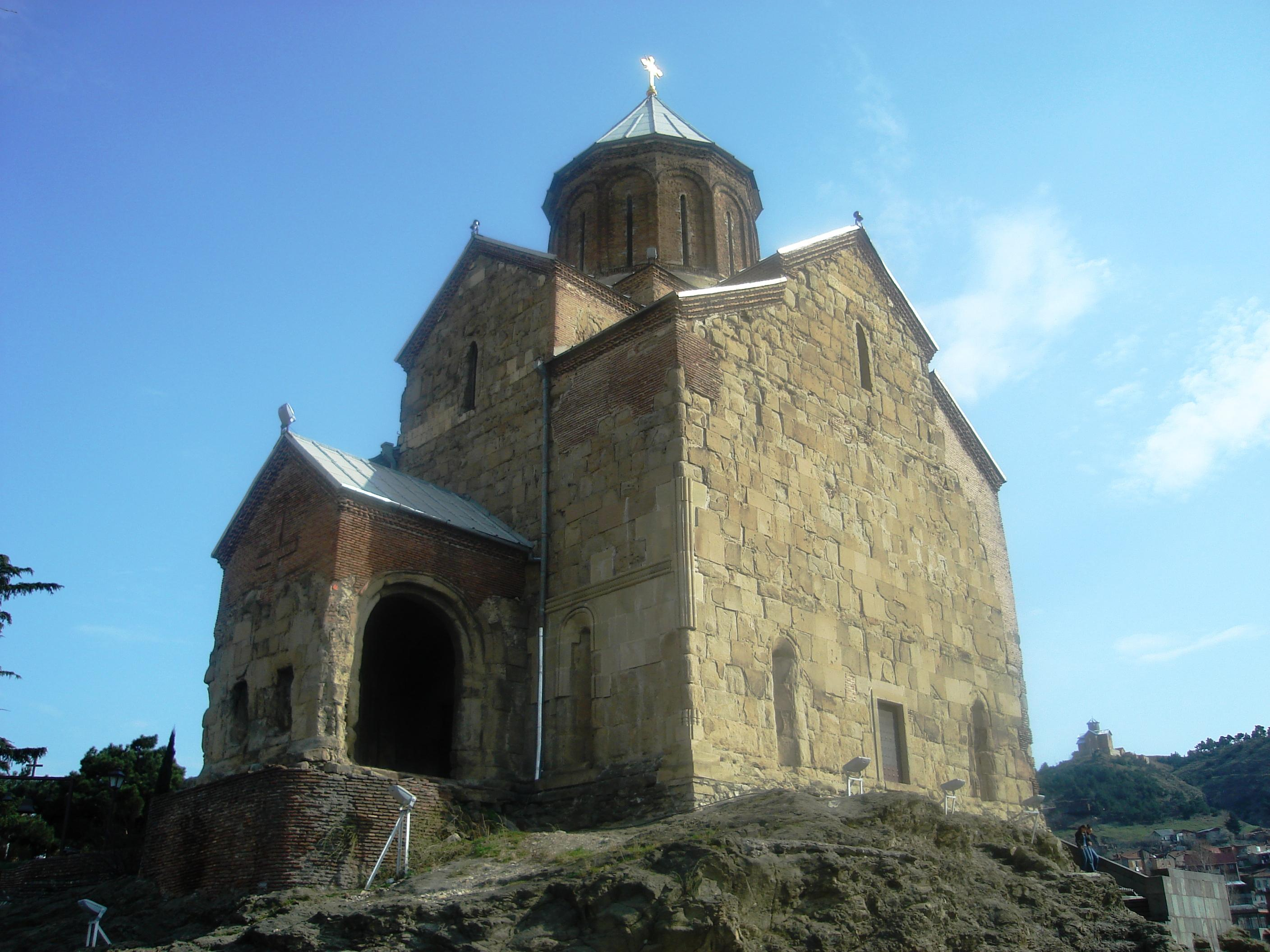
Metekhi Georgian cathedral

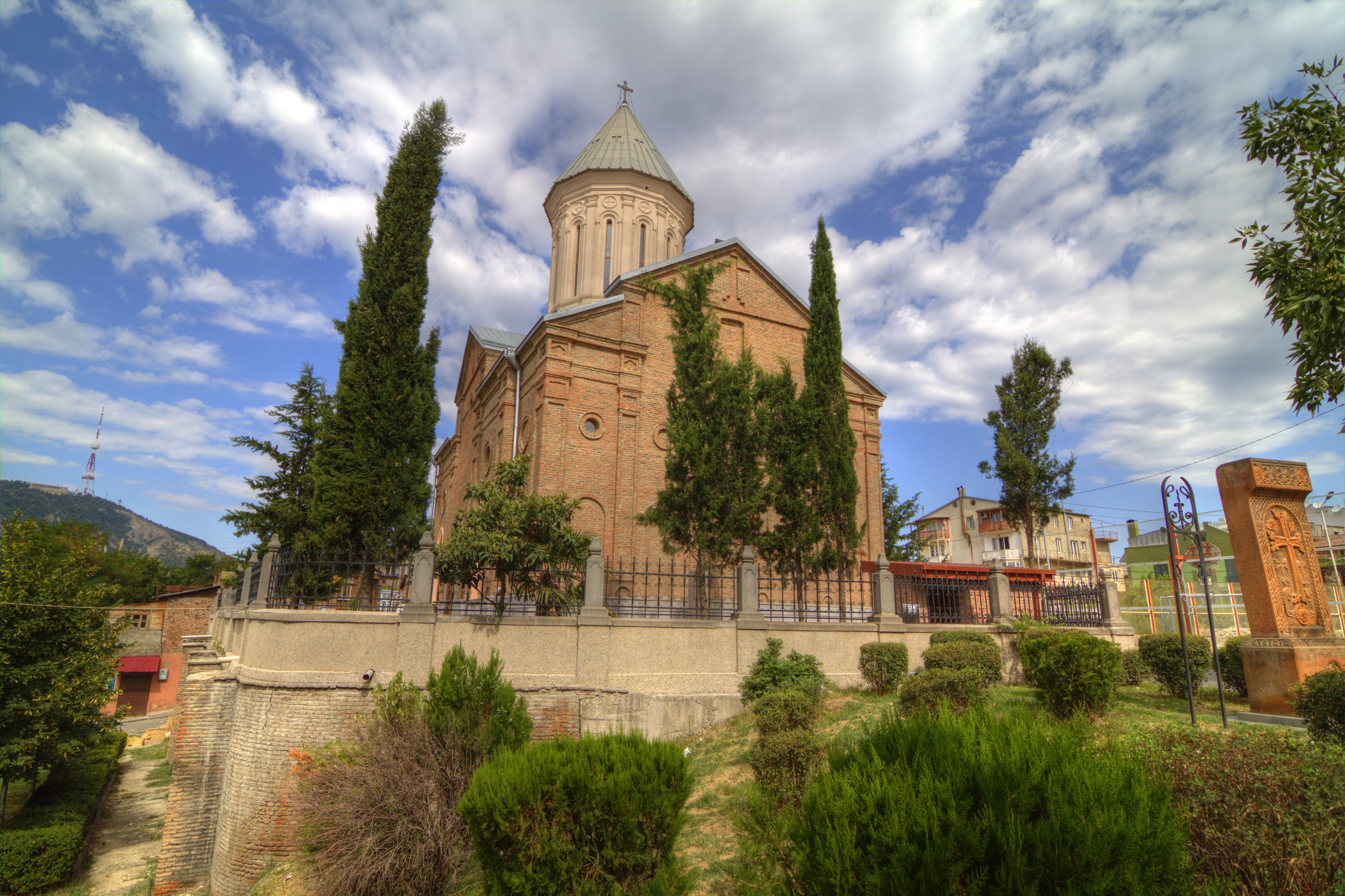
The 18th century Saint Ejmiatsin Armenian Church

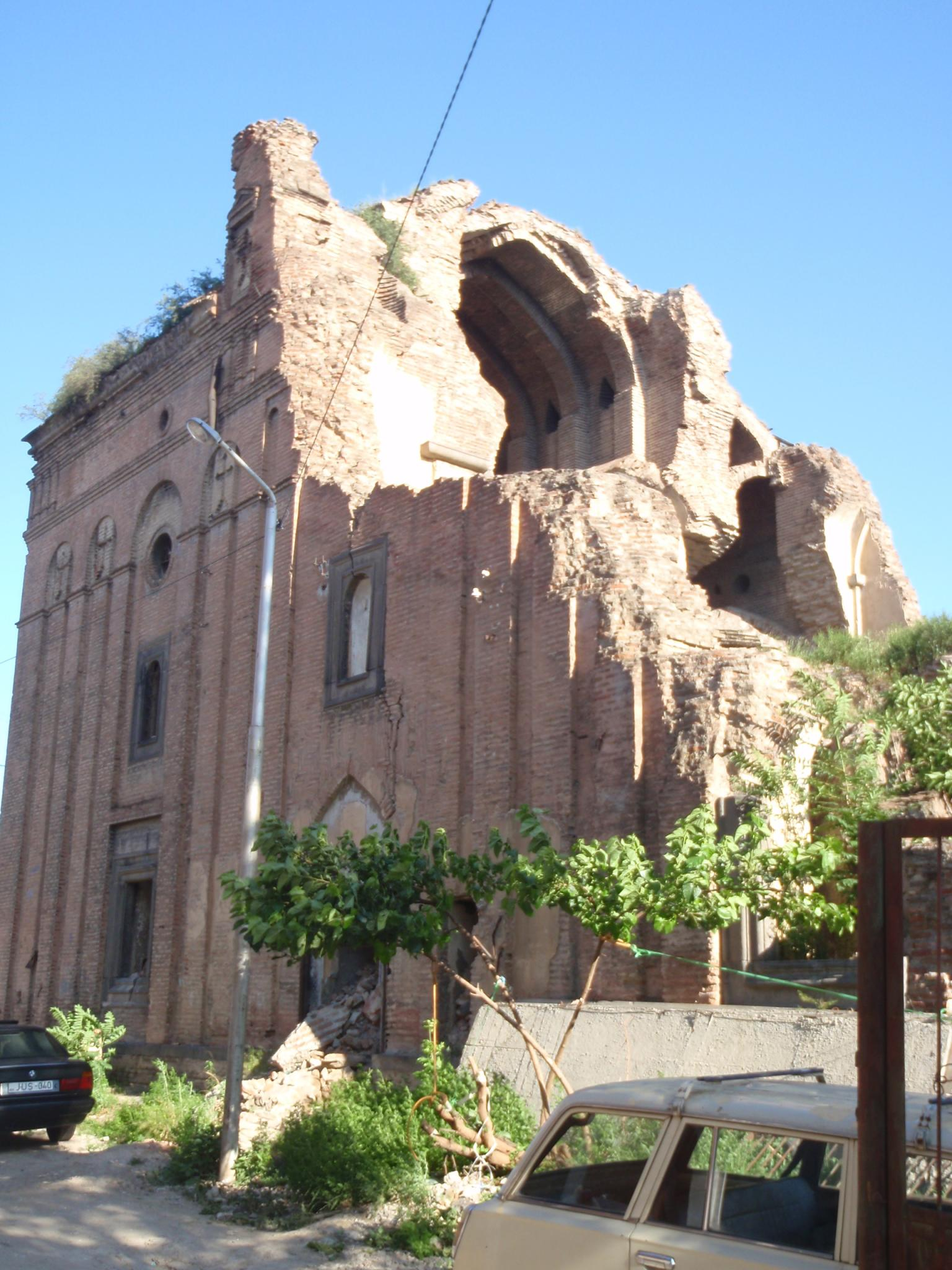
The ruined Armenian Church of the Red Gospel

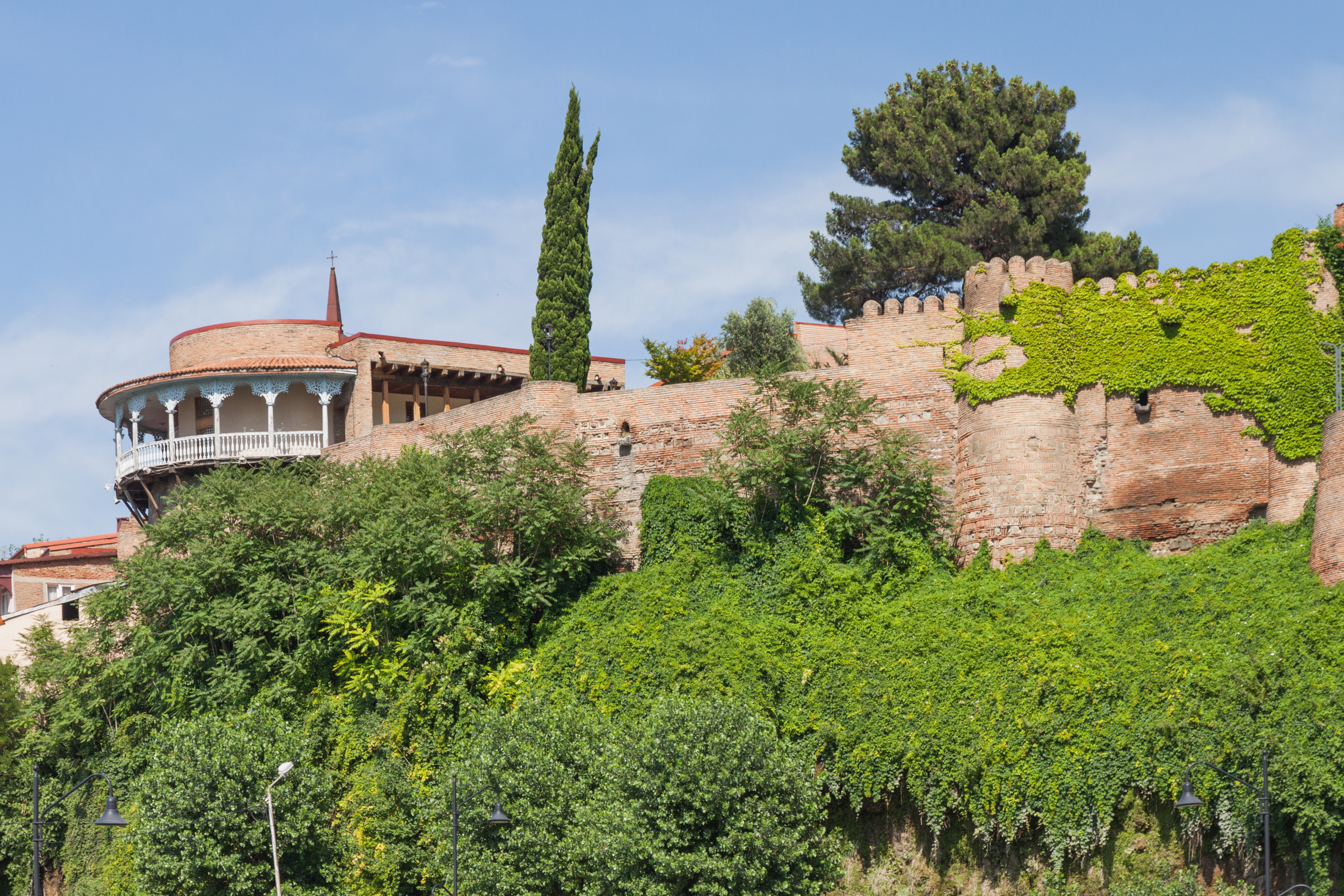
Remnants of Darejan Palace.
