= Isani District =

Isani District ისნის რაიონი
- Tbilisi District
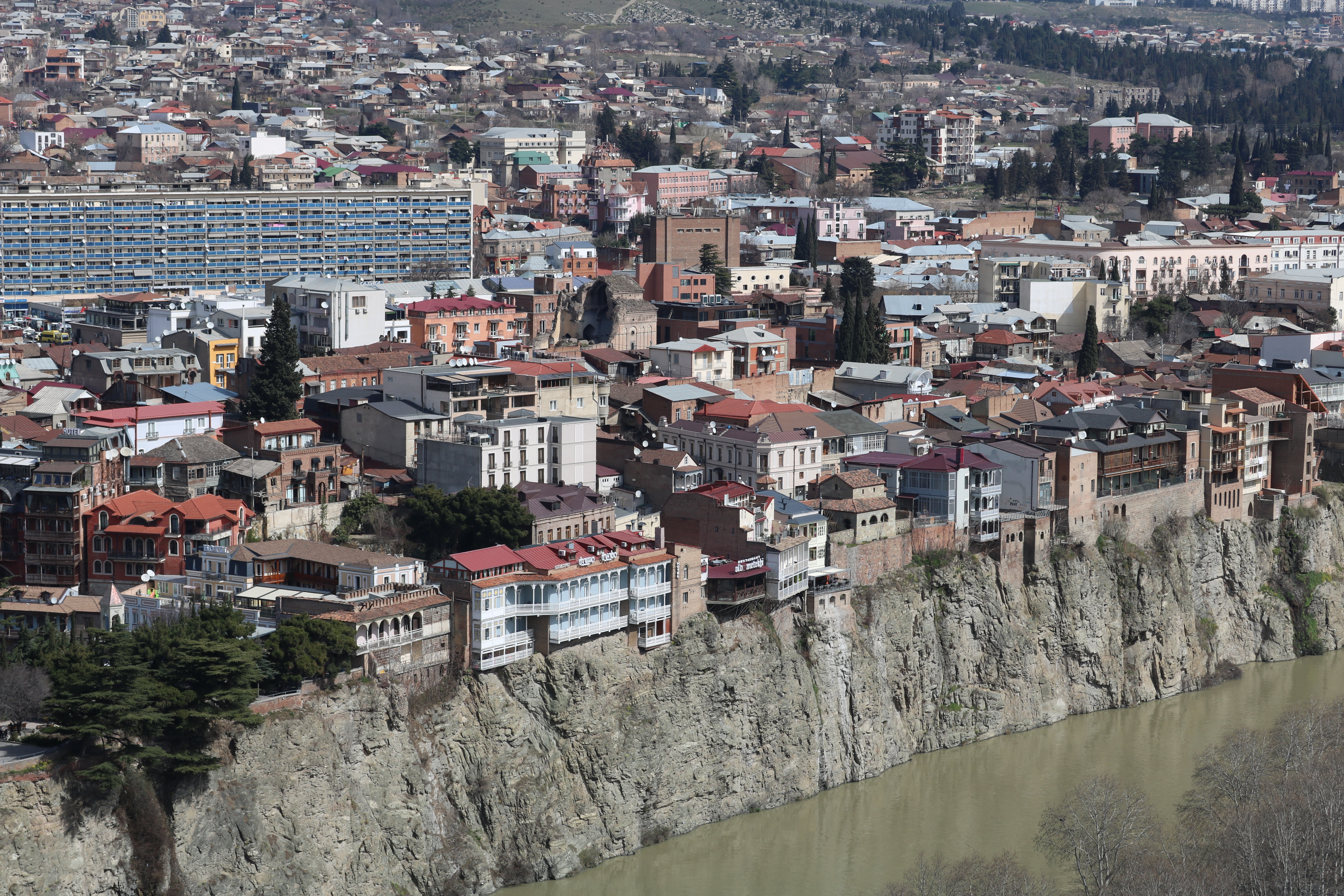
- Metekhi, Avlabari
- Interactive map of Isani District
- Location within Tbilisi
- Country: Georgia
- City: Tbilisi
- Administracion HQ: 8/1 Navtlughi Str, Tbilisi

Government
  - Body: Administration of district
  - Head of district: Nikoloz Elisashvili

Population (2017)
  - Total: 125,610
- Time zone: UTC+4 (Georgian Time)
- Website: www.tbilisi.gov.ge

Isani is an administrative district (raioni) of Tbilisi, capital of Georgia. It includes the neighborhoods of Isani, Avlabari, Navtlughi, Metromsheni, Elia, and Vazisubani.
