= Ejmiatsin Church, Tbilisi =

Armenian Apostolic church in Tbilisi, Georgia

Ejmiatsin Church
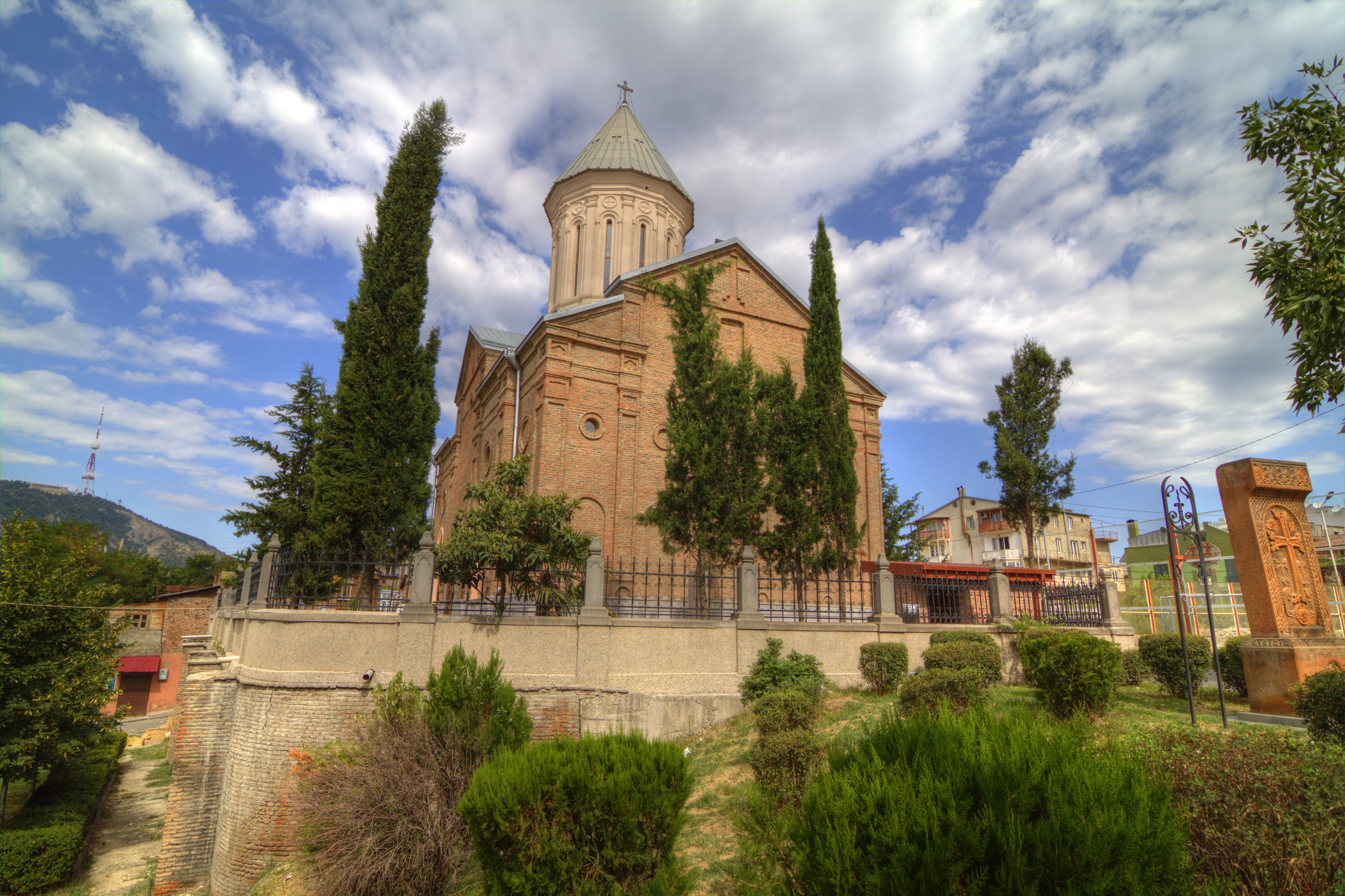
- The newly renovated Ejmiatsin Church in 2011

Religion
- Affiliation: Armenian Apostolic Church

Location
- Location: Avlabari district
- Interactive map of Ejmiatsin Church
- Coordinates: 41.692577°N 44.813750°E

Architecture
- Style: Armenian
- Completed: 18th century

The Ejmiatsin Church (Armenian: Էջմիածնեցոց Սուրբ Գևորգ եկեղեցի; Georgian: წმინდა ეჯმიაწინის ეკლესია) is an 18th-century Armenian Apostolic church in the Avlabari district of Old Tbilisi, Georgia. The church is adjacent to the Avlabari Square.

== History ==
In July 2014, the church was attacked. The Armenian diocese said it was "a crime committed on ethnic and religious grounds."

== Gallery ==
After renovation

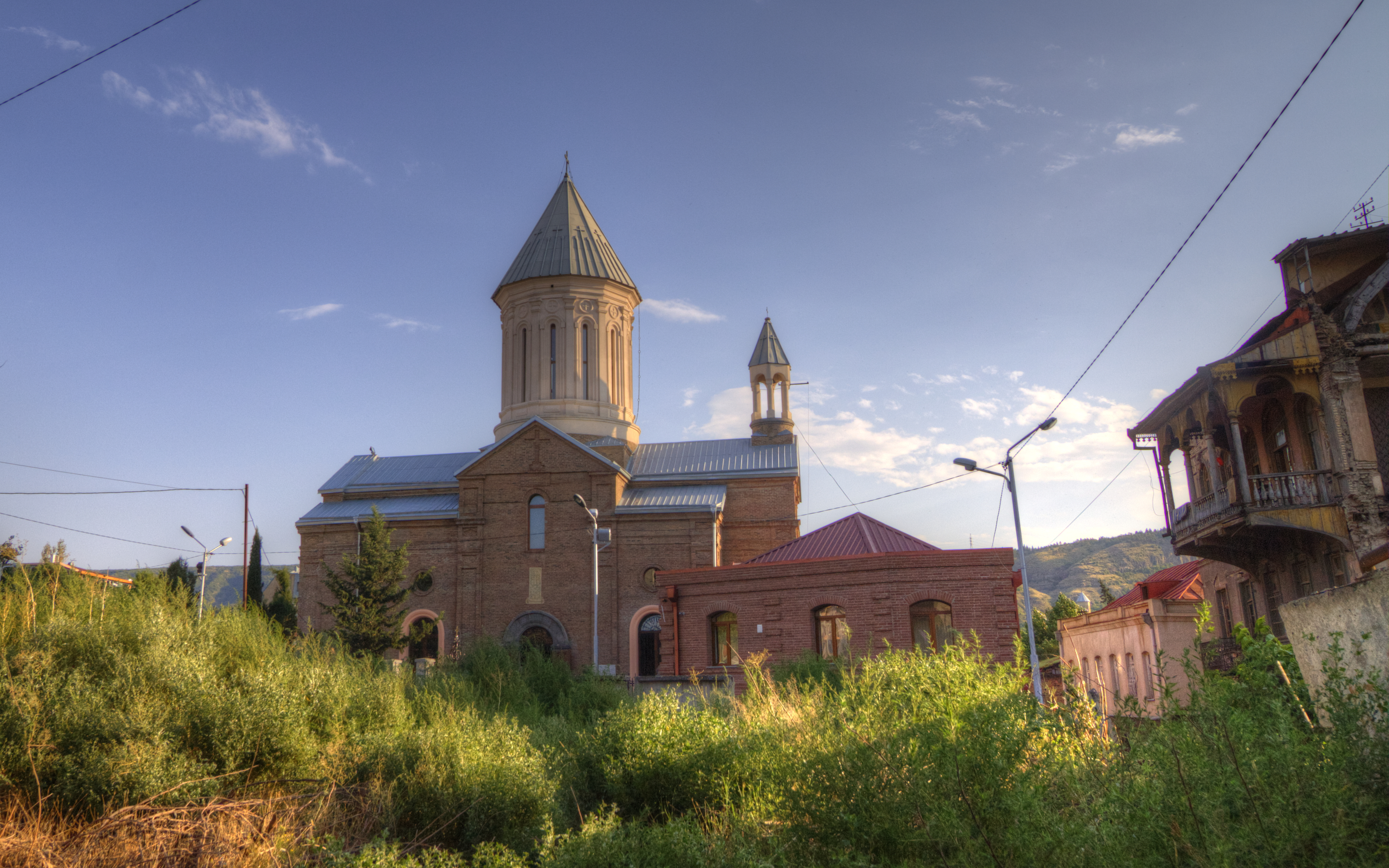
Side view of the church

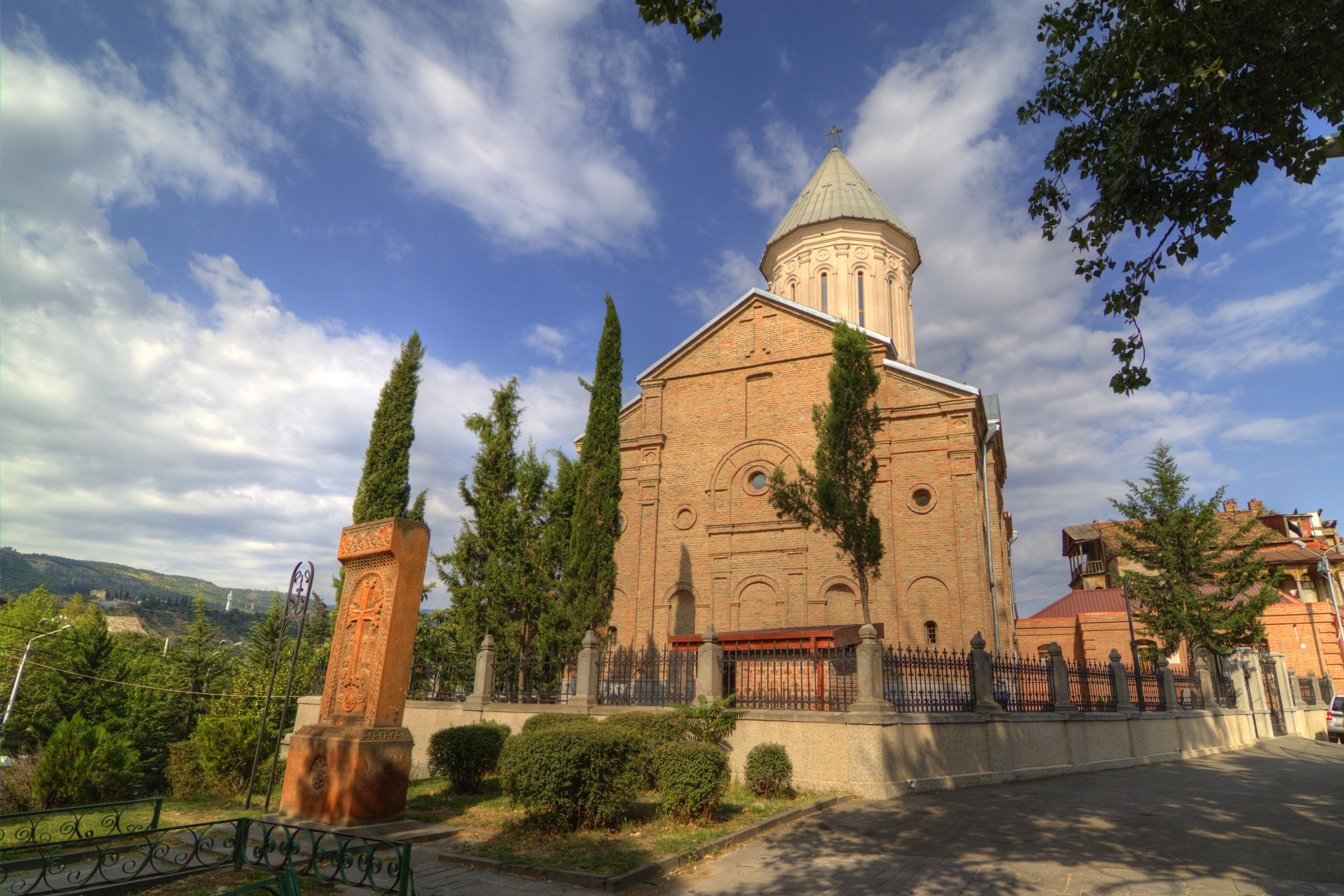
Walkway to the church grounds from Avlabari Square

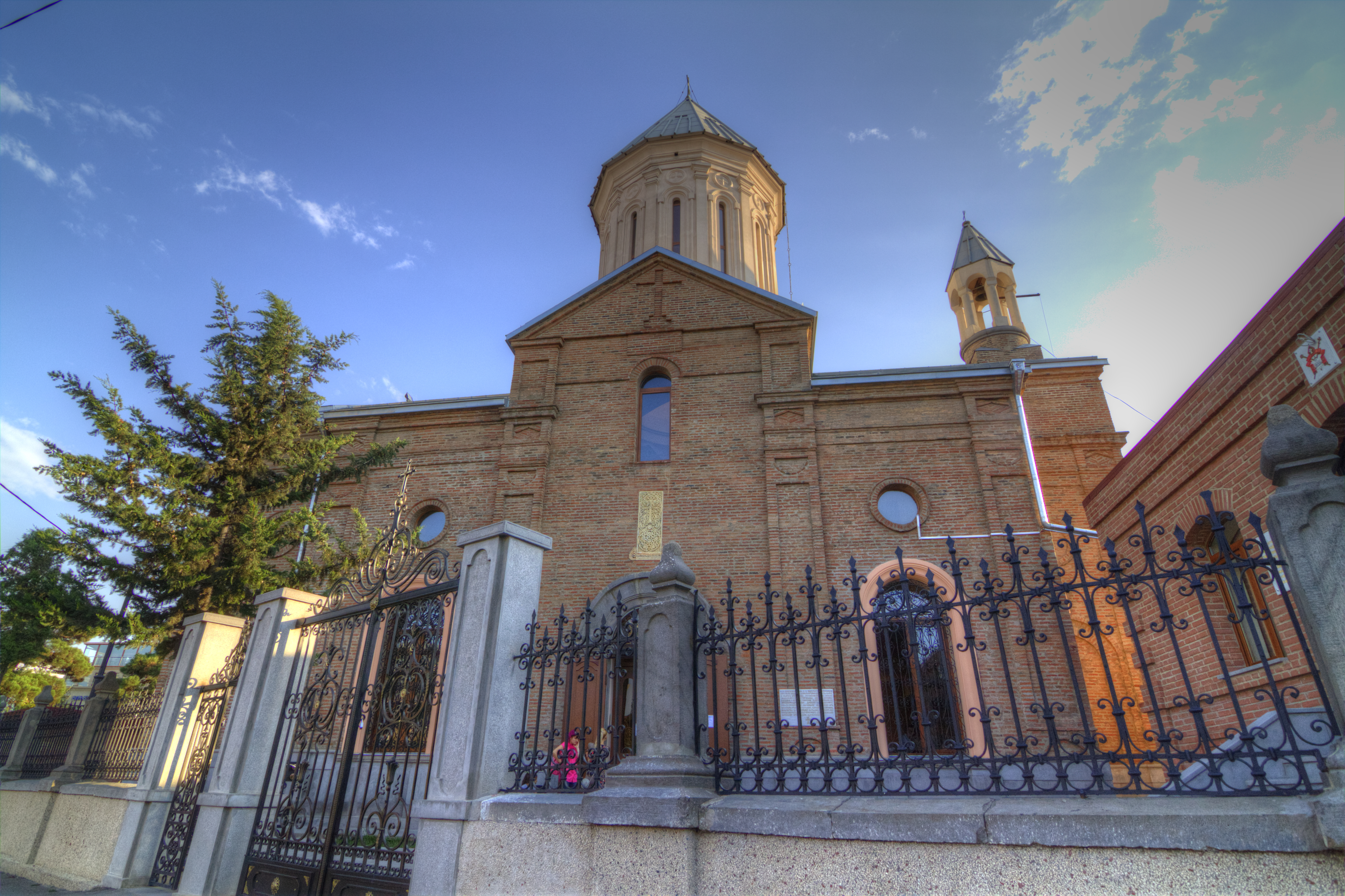
Entrance to the church

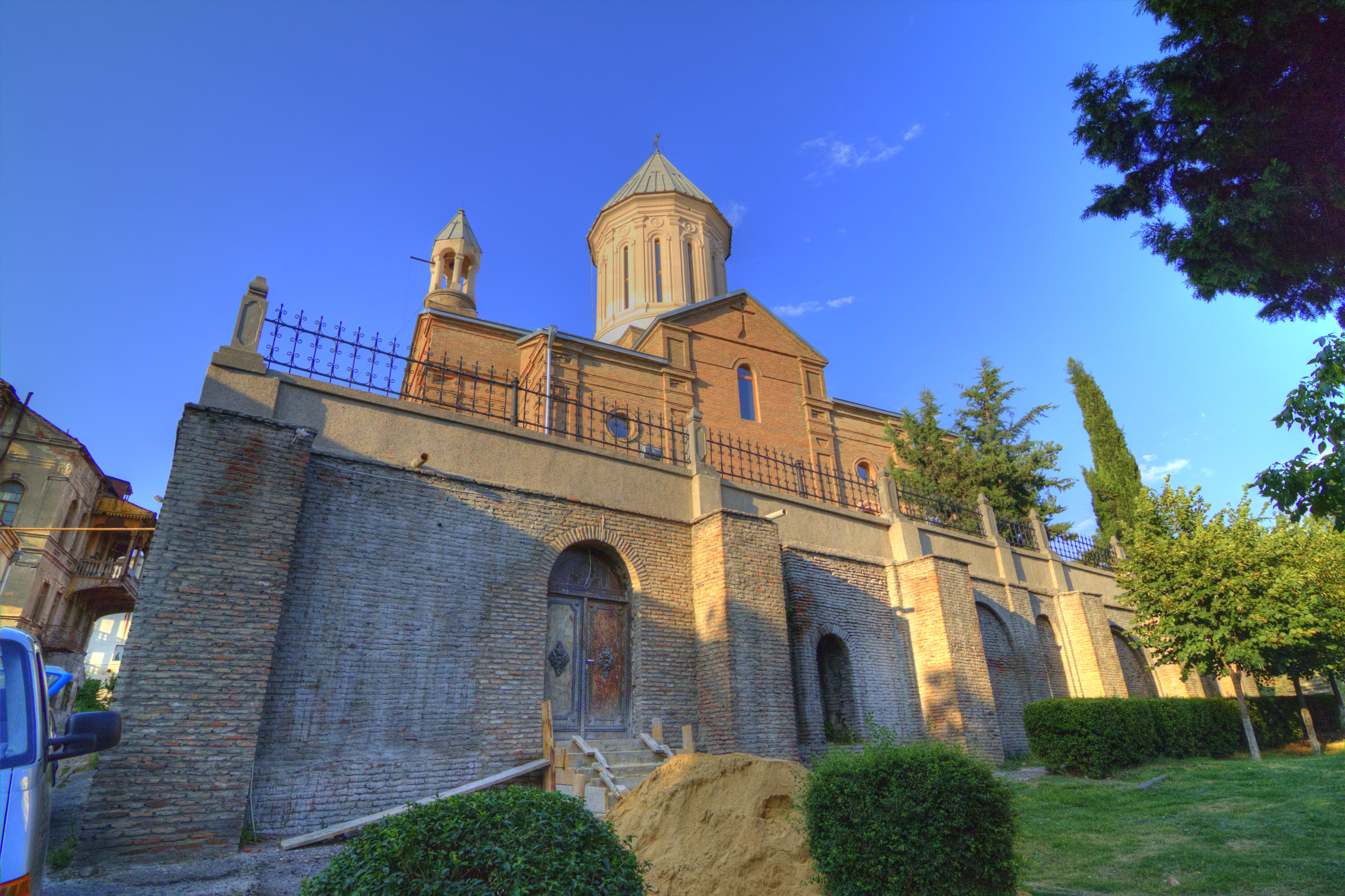
Foundation and walls of the church

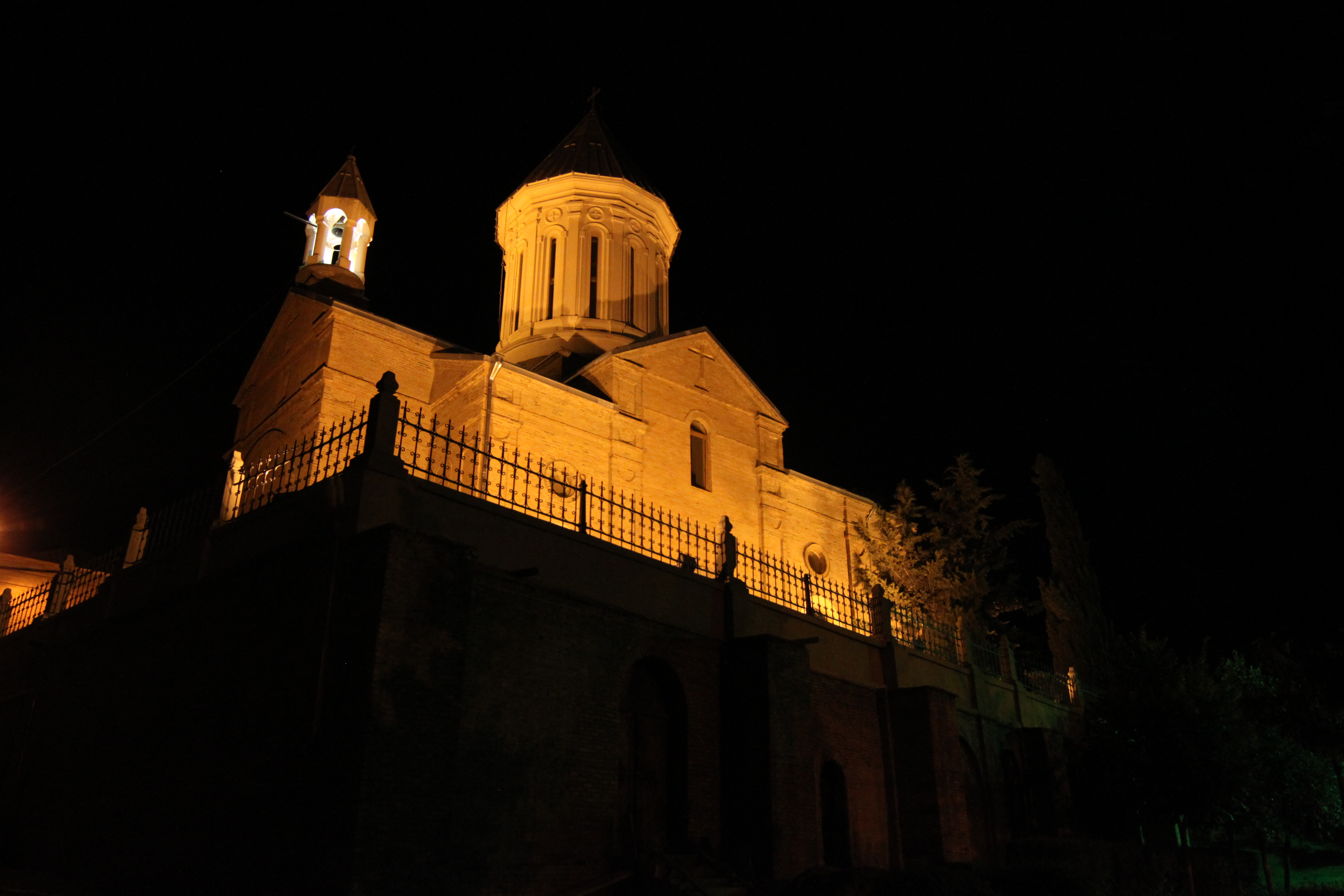
The church lit up at night

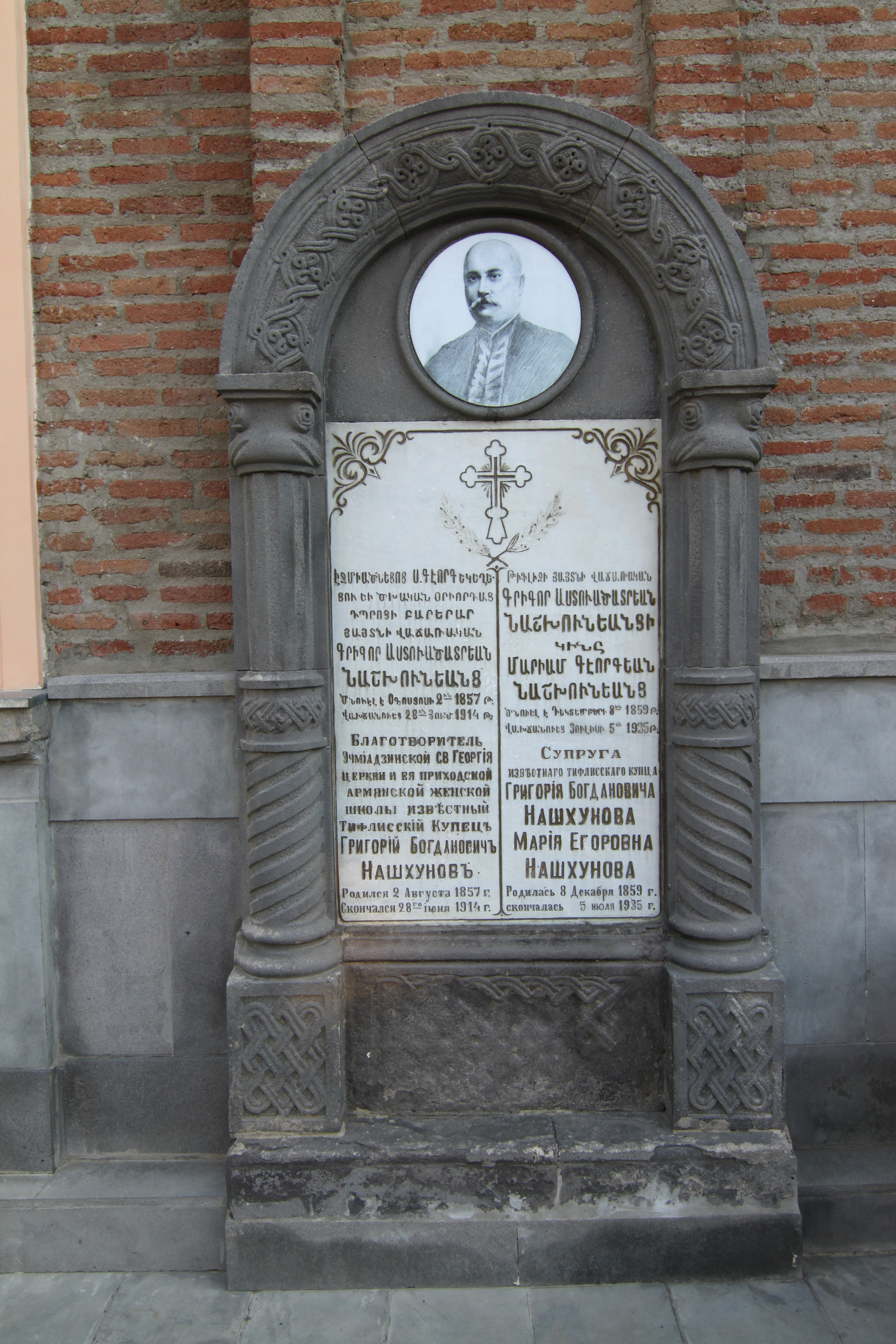
Memorial to the church benefactor near the entrance

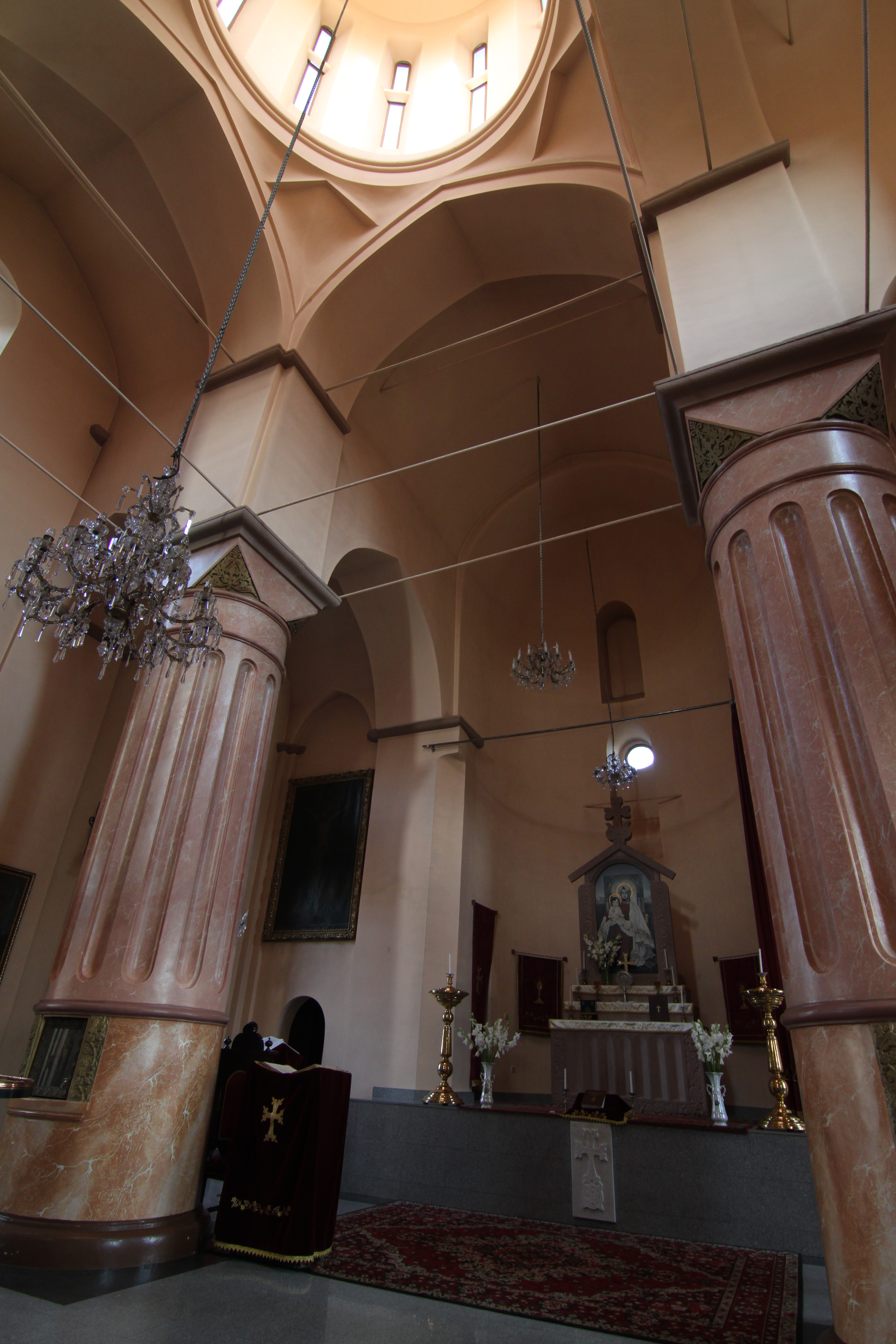
Altar

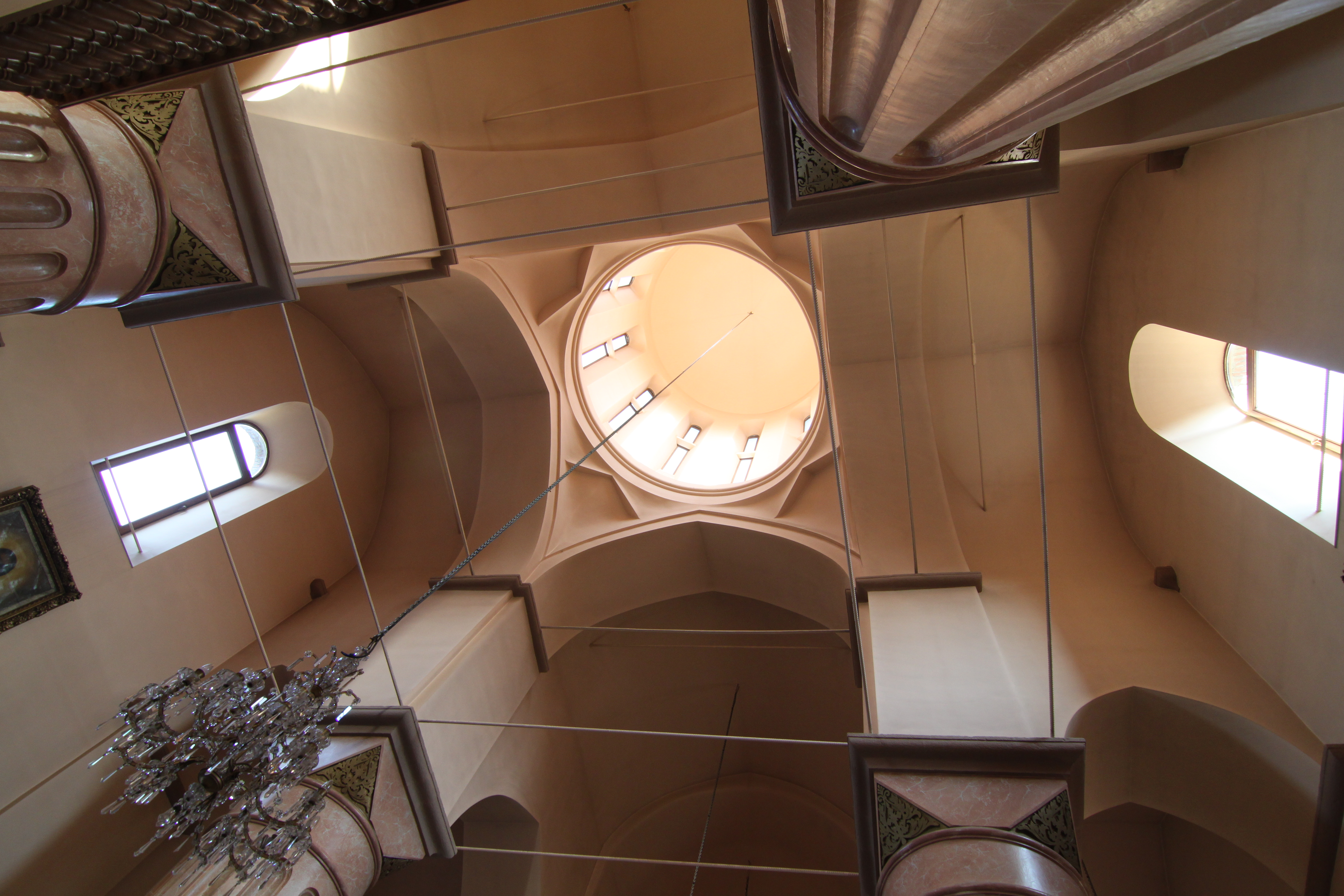
Dome and columns

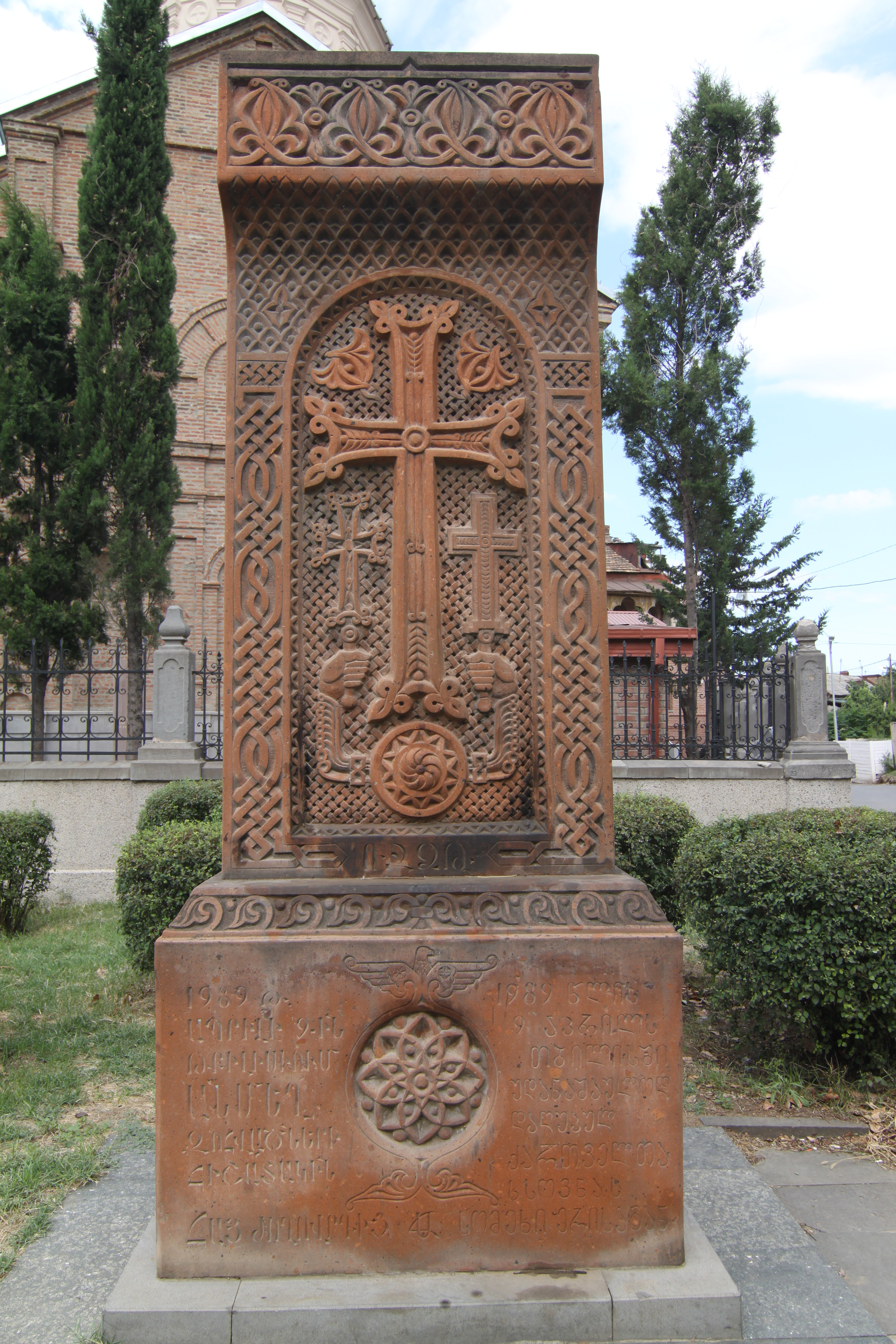
Khachkar memorial to innocent victims of Tbilisi's April 9, 1989 crackdown.

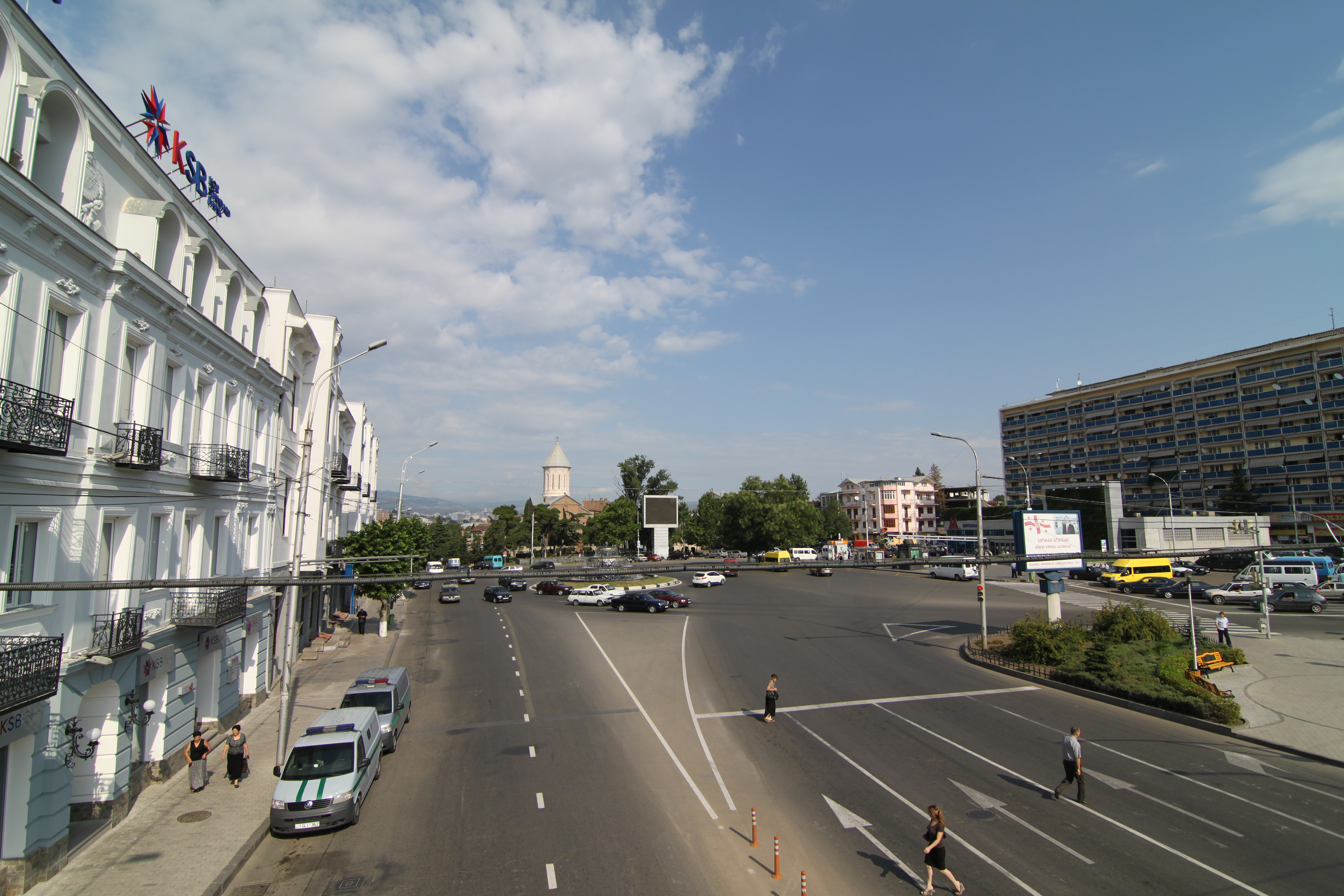
Location of the church near Avlabari Square

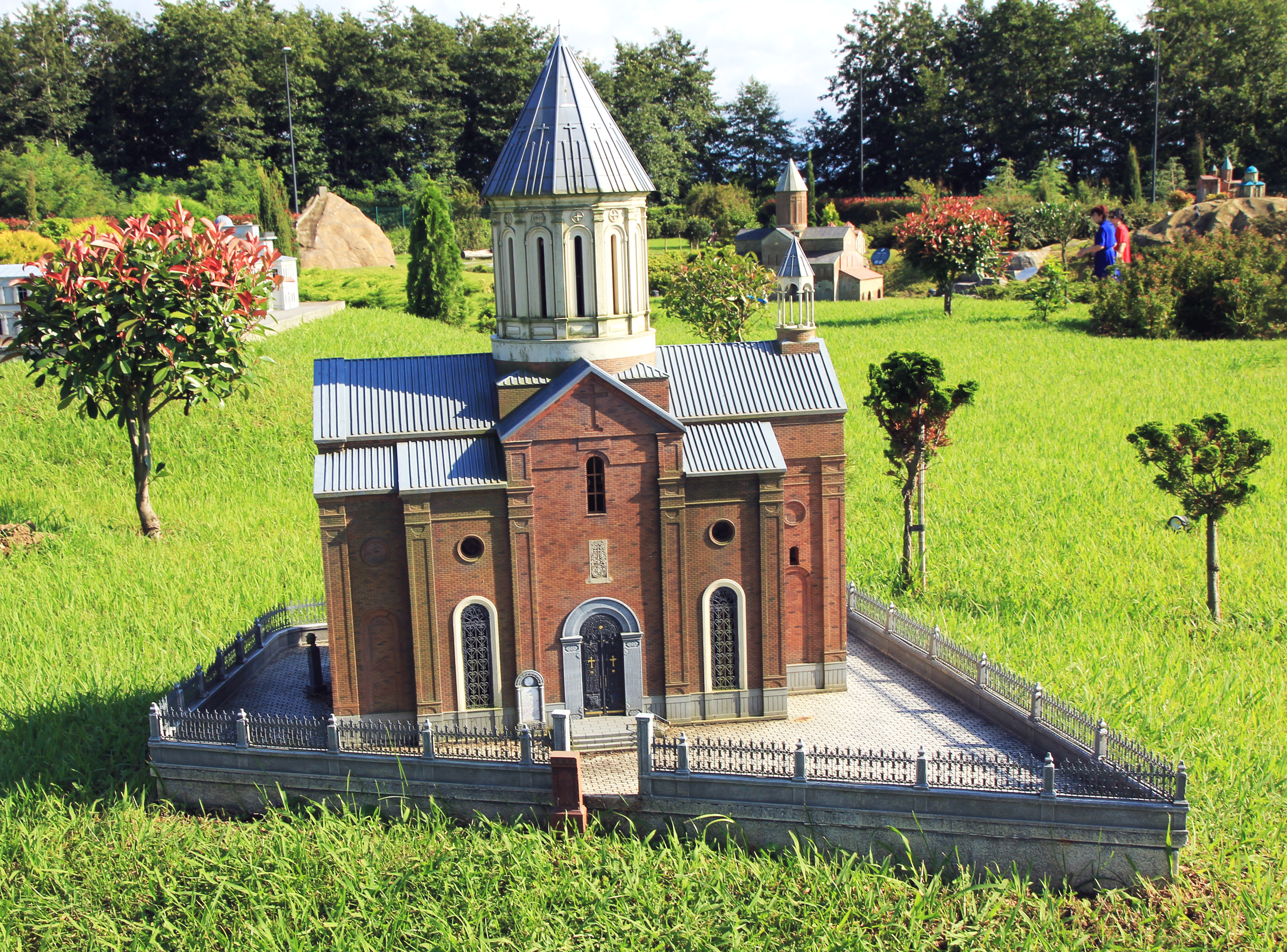
in Shekvetili miniature park
Before renovation

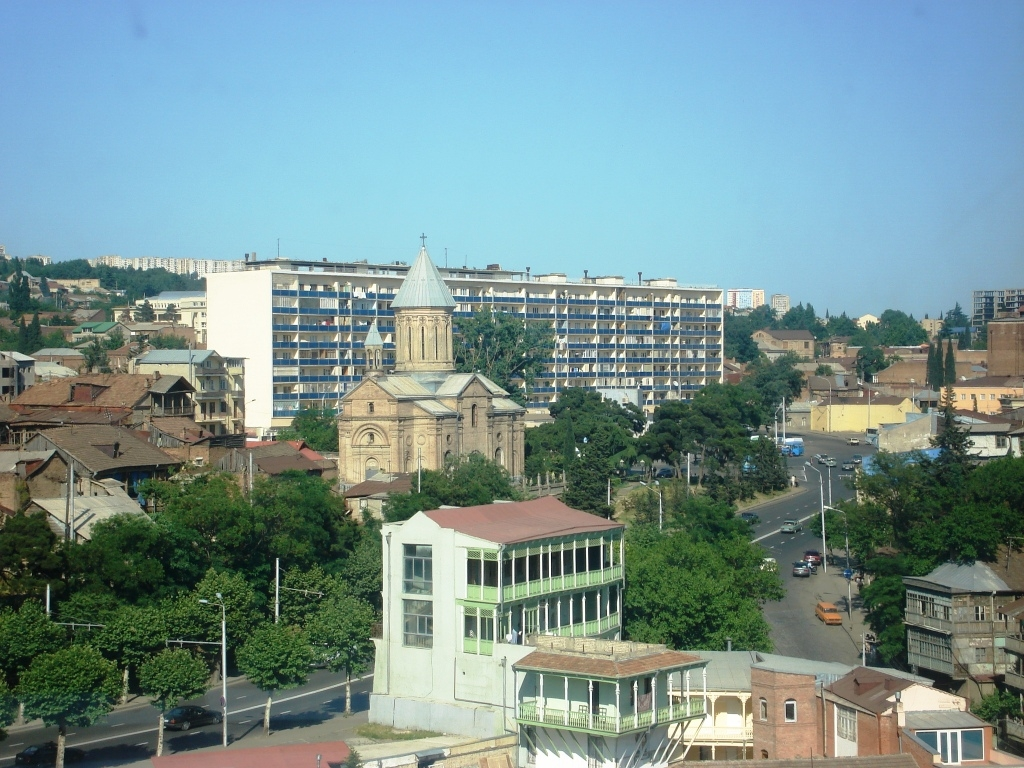
The Ejmiatsin Church adjacent to Avlabari Square

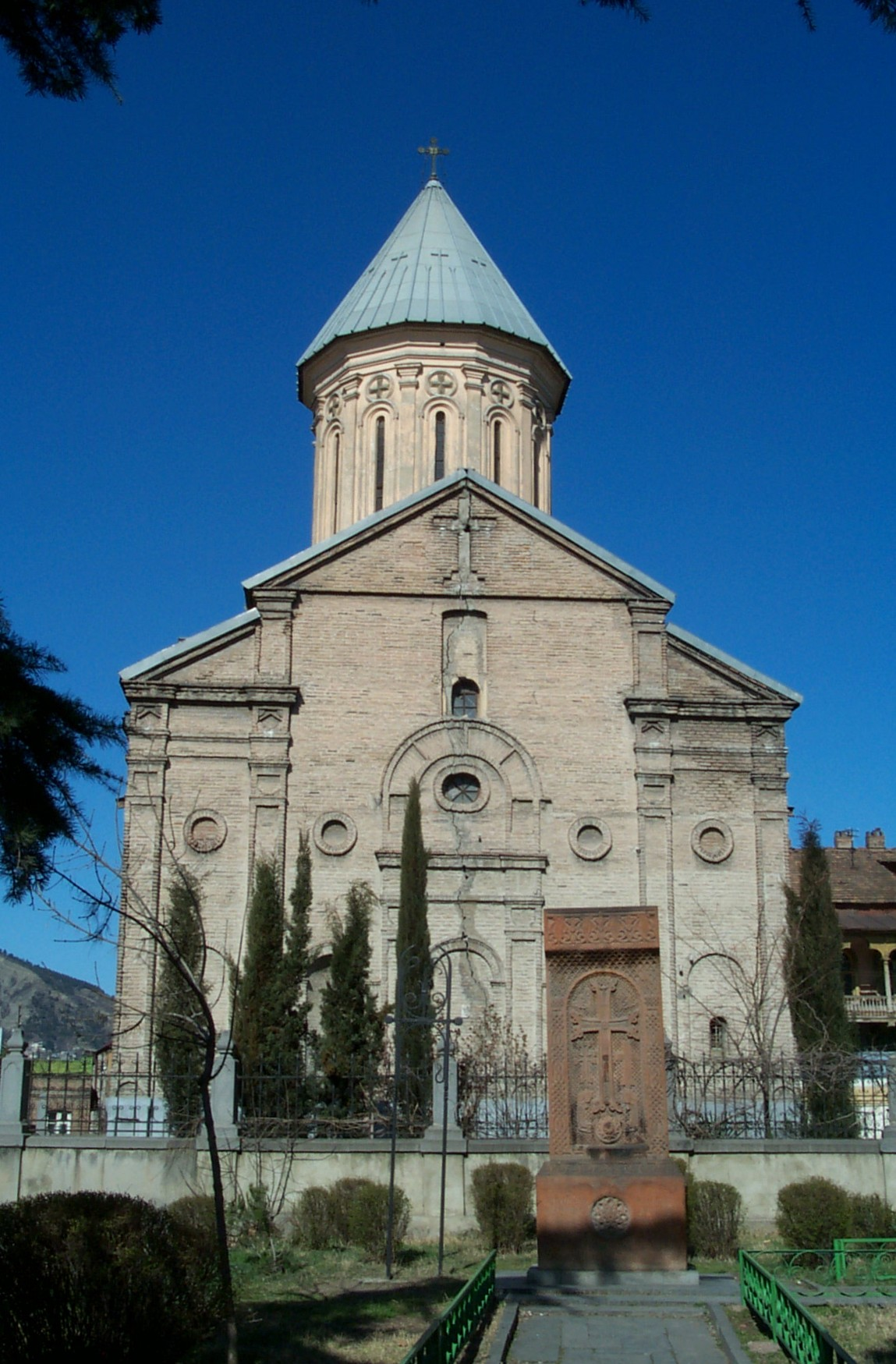
Closeup of church (before renovation)

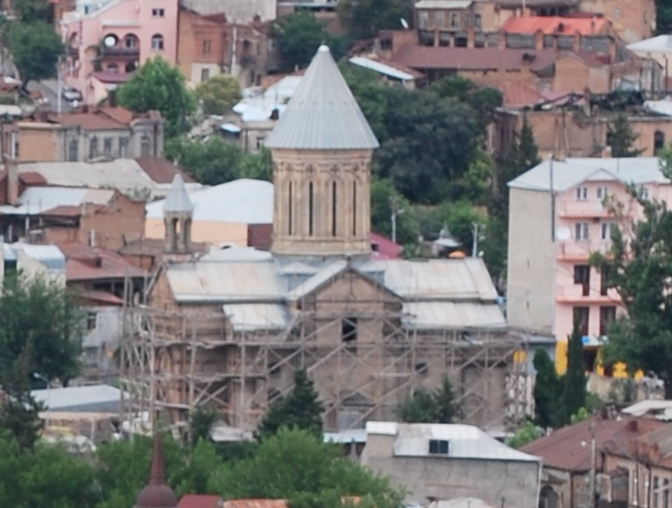
View of Ejmiatsin Church in its current state from Narikala fortress

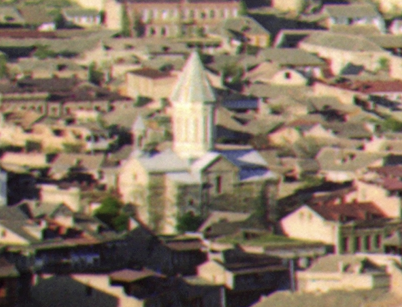
Historical picture from the early 1900s

== See also ==
- Church of the Red Gospel, a nearby 18th century Armenian church
- Armenians in Georgia
