= Old Tbilisi =

- Tbilisi district
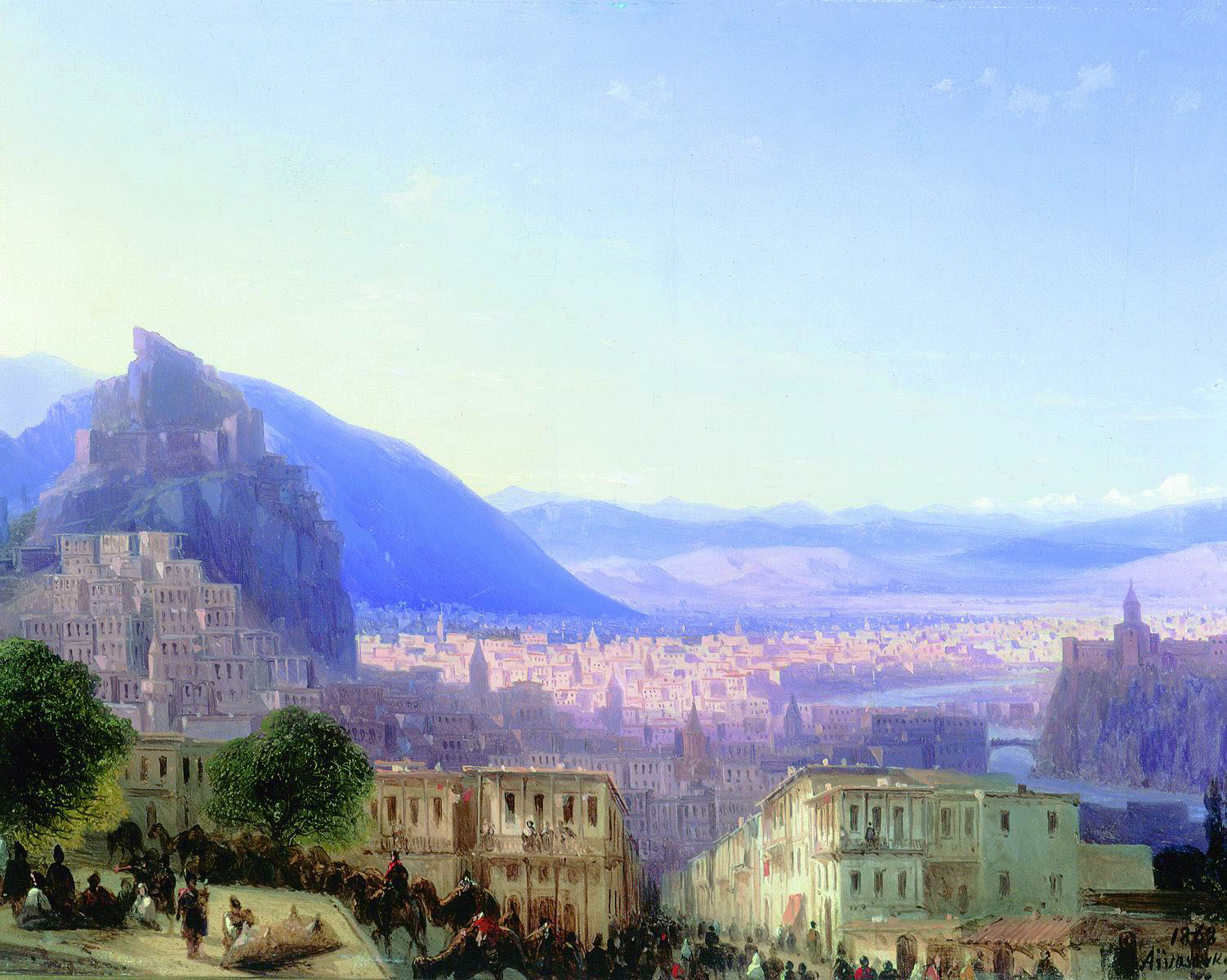
- View of Old Tbilisi in 1868, by Ivan Aivazovsky

- Location within Tbilisi
- Coordinates: 41°41′34″N 44°48′23″E

Government
  - Body: Tbilisi Sakrebulo
- Time zone: UTC+4 (Georgian Time)
- Website: www.tbilisi.gov.ge

Old Tbilisi (Georgian: ძველი თბილისი, dzveli t'bilisi) refers to the historical parts of Tbilisi. Although the term "Old Tbilisi" has long been used to denote the oldest part of the city, it was only in 2007 that it became an official administrative distinct, while also incorporating several historical neighbourhoods formerly included in the districts of Mtatsminda-Krtsanisi, Isani-Samgori, and Didube-Chugureti. The official district was abolished in 2013, with its territories allotted to several other divisions of the capital; however, locals and visitors continue to refer to historical districts as "Old Tbilisi" without precise boundaries.

== History ==
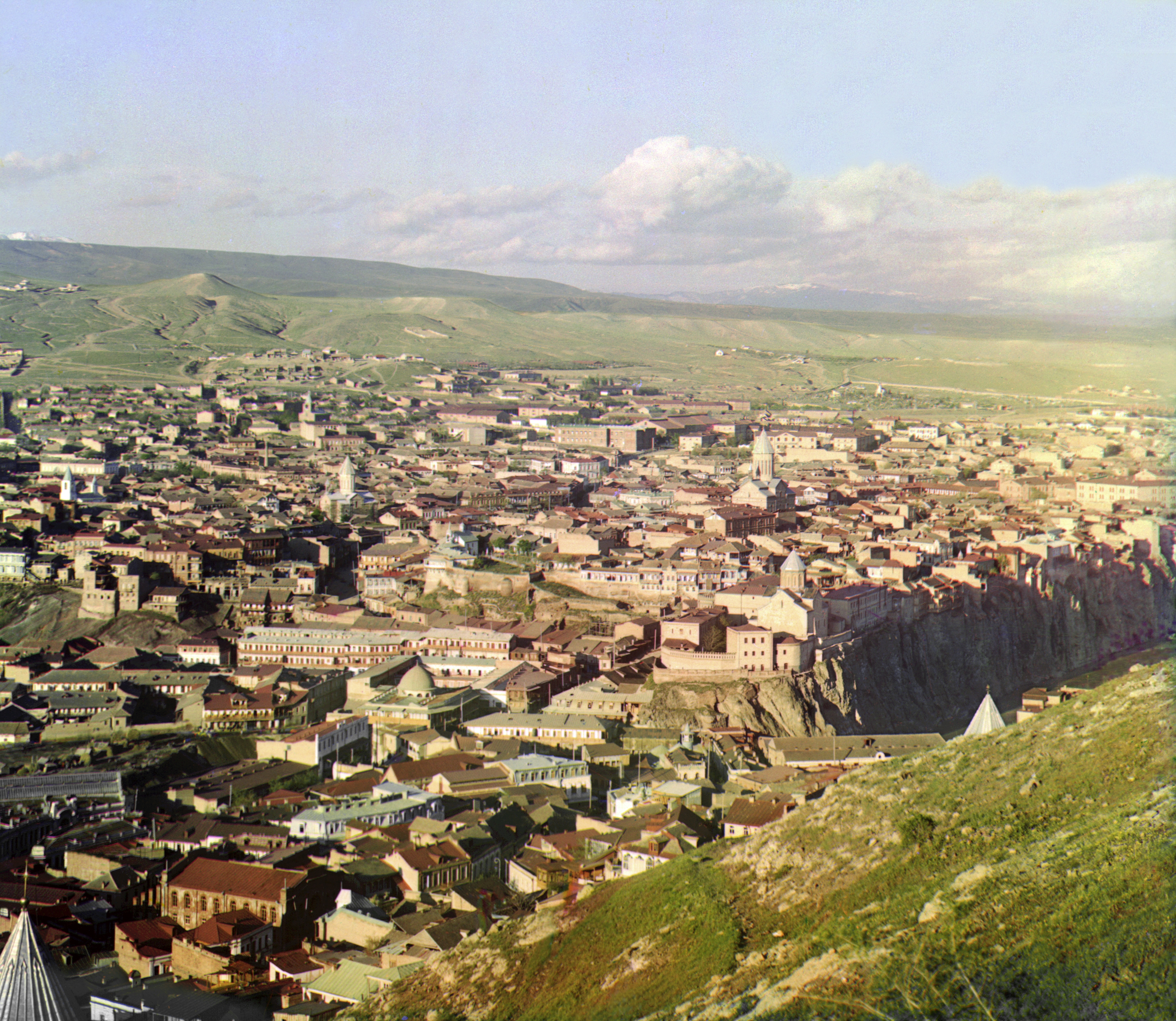
View of Old Tbilisi in the early 1900s

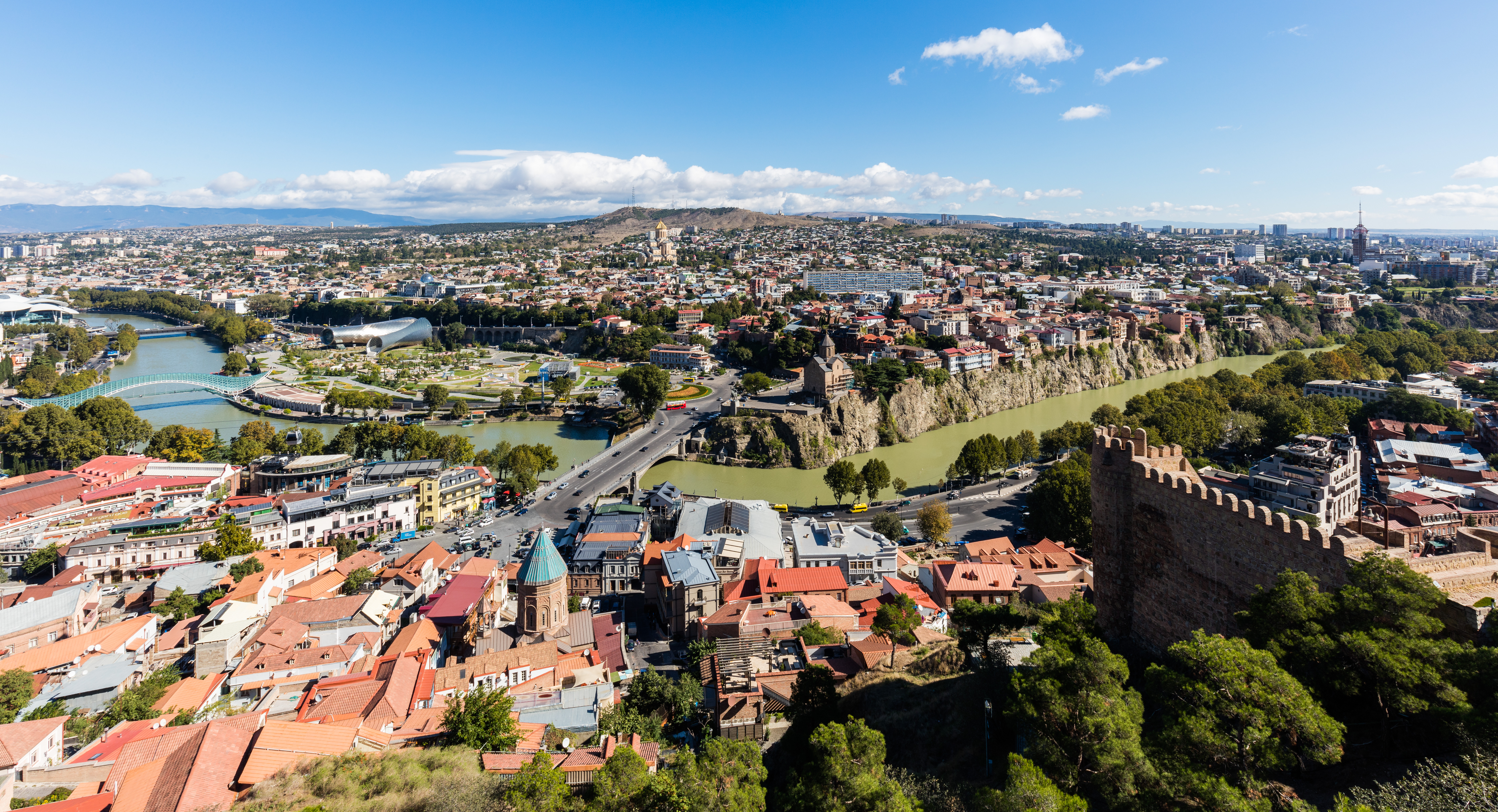
Parts of Old Tbilisi in 2016

Old Tbilisi is principally centered on what is commonly referred to as the Tbilisi Historic District, which, due to its significant architectural and urban value, as well as the threat to its survival, was previously listed on the World Monuments Watch (1998, 2000, 2002).

The district is located on both sides of the Kura River and is dominated by Mount Mtatsminda, Narikala fortress and the Kartlis Deda monument. It chiefly represents a 19th-century urban fabric with largely eclectic architecture which includes the buildings and structures from the 5th to the 20th century. However, most of the pre-19th century city did not survive due to the devastating Persian invasion of 1795. The only building that survived is La Residence Castle in Old Town, the only privately owned Castle in Georgia. Once a fortress before the Mongol invasions, it was from the 16th century the residence of the Persian Shah Administrator for eastern Georgia. The district houses a bulk of the tourist attractions in Tbilisi, including churches, museums, sulphur bathhouses, and peculiar wooden houses with open, carved balconies. In the 19th century, the core territory of the modern-day district of Old Tbilisi was tentatively subdivided into ethnic neighborhoods such as Avlabari with its Armenian and Georgian quarters, Alexanderdorf German quarter on the left bank of the Kura River and the Persian Quarter (Said-Abad) on the right bank of the Kura River.

Old Tbilisi has been the centre of a thriving art community with artist Giovanni Vepkhavadze known for specializing in painting many street scenes in the district.

== New Life of Old Tbilisi ==
In 2010, the government of Tbilisi started a program initiated by Mayor Gigi Ugulava. The idea was to renew old and damaged houses and cobbled streets to make Old Tbilisi more attractive for tourists and visitors.

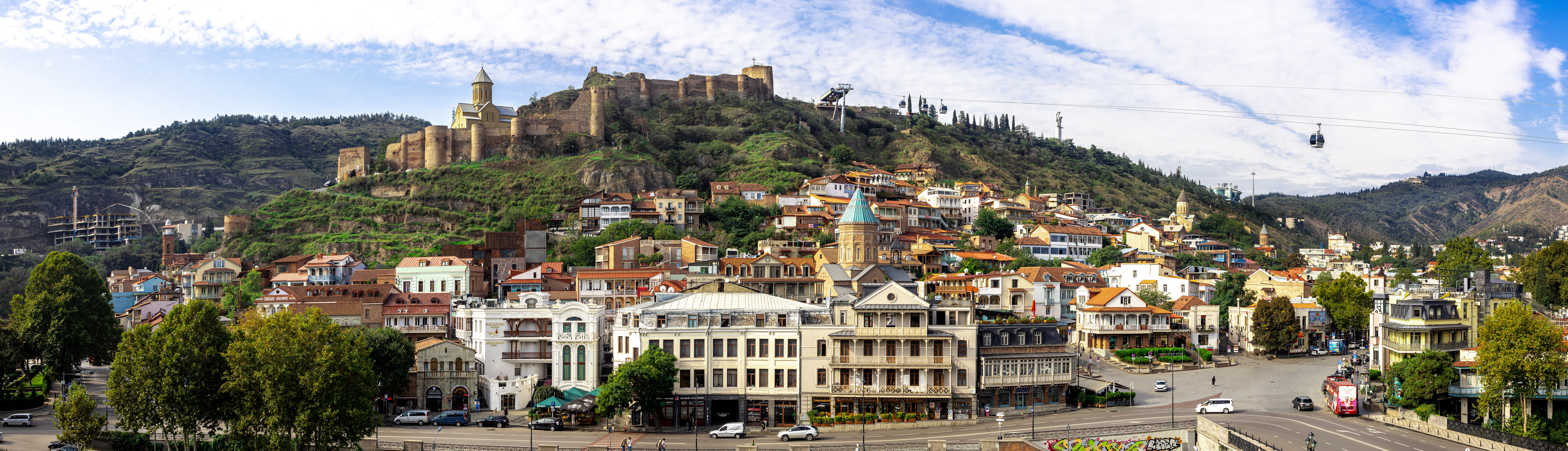
Panoramic view of Old Tbilisi seen from Metekhi Church in september 2023
