= Ayyub Huseynov =

Azerbaijani artist

- Born: Ayyub Museyib oghlu Huseynov; September 2, 1916; Kangarli, Nakhcivan, Azerbaijan
- Died: April 17, 1998 (aged 81); Baku, Azerbaijan
- Movement: Realism

Ayyub Huseynov (Azerbaijani: Əyyub Hüseynov) was an Azerbaijani artist, pedagogue, Honored Art Worker of the USSR, member of the Union of Artists of Azerbaijan.

== Biography ==
Ayyub Huseynov was born in Khok in Norashen district (now Kangarli) in the Russian Empire. His first education was received in 1930 in the Azerbaijan Painting Technique in Baku and later in 1935 at the Tbilisi State Academy of Arts.

After completing his higher education, he returned to Nakhchivan and worked for some time as a set designer at the Nakhchivan State Drama Theater.

In 1948, Ayyub Huseynov moved from Nakhchivan to Baku. Here, in addition to teaching at the Azerbaijan State School of Art named after Azim Azimzade, where he once studied, he also engaged in independent creative work. From 1948 until the end of his life, Ayyub Huseynov taught at the school, and from 1956 to 1965, he served as its director.

Since 1949, he was a member of the Azerbaijan Artists' Union and for a long time was elected chairman of the union's party committee. He served as a district deputy for three terms. For many years, he was elected a member and chairman of the art council under the Azerbaijan Art Fund.

His works are preserved in the Azerbaijan National Museum of Art, the State Archive of Literature and Art of the Republic of Azerbaijan, the Azerbaijan State Art Gallery, the fund of the Azerbaijan Artists' Union, as well as in private collections and his own studio.

Ayyub Huseynov died in Baku on April 17, 1998.

== Career ==
The creative work of Ayyub Huseynov can be divided into three periods. The first period covers the years 1930–1950 and is regarded as the early phase of his artistic career. The second period, which spans the 1960s to the 1980s, is considered the most productive phase of his creativity. The third period, from 1980 to 1990, is viewed as the mature phase of his creative work.

Education at the Academy of Art in Tbilisi was accompanied by difficulties and successes in mastering artistic skills and in-depth knowledge. During his studies in Tbilisi, he has learned from the prominent Georgian artists and has mastered the skills of perfection in painting. After completing higher education, he returned to Nakhchivan. During his life in Nakhchivan, he produced artworks for the young artists, who created works of various genres and performances staged at the local theater. Here he has prepared artistic designs and costume sketches for many performances with well-known painter Shamil Gaziyev. In the theater of Nakhchivan, he created costume sketches and paintings for plays like Abdurrahim bey Hagverdiyev's "Peri-cadu", "Farhad and Shirin" by Samad Vurgun, "Vatan" by Abdulla Shaig, "Polad" by Nagi Nagiyev, "Gunash doğur" by Abulfaz Abbasguliyev. A young artist, who was convinced that the artistic environment of Baku would create more opportunities for his future career, moved from Nakhchivan to the capital in 1948. By that, he became a teacher where he studied for the first time. During this period, a successful outcome of the school teaching process was that most of our artists and sculptors, representing Azerbaijan's deserving art in the world, have been trained in the years when he was the director. He played an important role in the history of "Azimzadeh School", which was the prestigious educational institution in the former USSR. While it is difficult to combine pedagogical activity with creativity, Ayyub Huseynov managed to succeed. An artist who has been participating in exhibitions in Baku and the former USSR, as well as outside the country's borders, has introduced himself as a master artist in all genres of his own art.

== Legacy ==
In 2006 and 2016, exhibitions dedicated to the 90th and 100th anniversaries of the artist were organized by the Ministry of Culture and Tourism. In 2018, the Nizami Cinema Center hosted the premiere of the documentary film “Self-Portrait”, which was dedicated to the life and work of Ayyub Huseynov and commissioned by the Ministry of Culture and Tourism.

== Awards ==
- Honored Art Worker of the Azerbaijan SSR— December 18, 1980
- Medal for Distinguished Labor — June 9, 1959
