= Norashen =

Norashen (Armenian: Նորաշեն 'new village') may refer to:

== Armenia ==
- Norashen, Ararat
- Norashen, Aragatsotn
- Norashen, Gegharkunik
- Norashen, Lori
- Norashen, Tavush
- Norabats, Ararat, formerly Norashen
- Shoghakn, Aparan, formerly Norashen

== Azerbaijan ==
- Norashen, Nakhchivan
- Günəşli, Khojavend, or Norashen
- Sharur, formerly Norashen

== See also ==
- Norashen Church, Tbilisi, Georgia
