= Lizbirt =

Lizbirt Lızbırt
- Location within Azerbaijan
- Coordinates: 39°28′50″N 45°20′28″E
- Country: Azerbaijan
- Autonomous republic: Nakhchivan
- Time zone: UTC+4 (AZT)
  - Summer (DST): UTC+5 (AZT)

Lizbirt is a village in the Kangarli District , Nakhchivan Autonomous Republic , Azerbaijan.
