= Norashen Church =

Church building in Tbilisi, Georgia

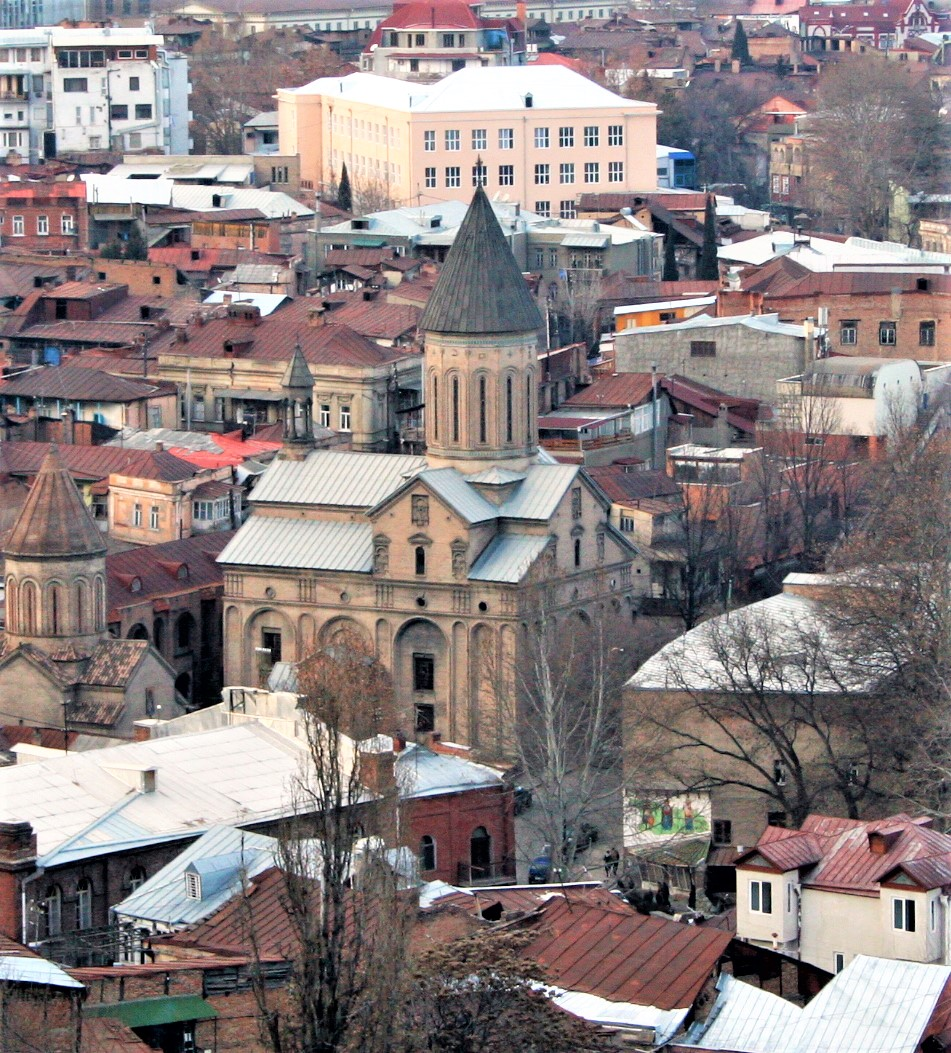
- The church in 2007

Religion
- Affiliation: historically Armenian Apostolic Church; claimed by the Georgian Orthodox Church in 1995
- Status: Defunct

Location
- Location: 41 Kote Abkhazi (Leselidze) Street, Tbilisi, Georgia
- Interactive map of Norashen Church
- Coordinates: 41°41′28″N 44°48′24″E

Architecture
- Style: Armenian
- Groundbreaking: 1467

Norashen (Armenian: Նորաշեն, "newly built"; Georgian: ნორაშენი, Norasheni) is a non-functioning Armenian Apostolic church in Tbilisi, Georgia. It is located in the old town, near Sioni Cathedral and Jvaris Mama Church.

The church has historically been known as the Church of the Holy Mother of God (Սուրբ Աստվածածին, Surb Astvatsatsin). Built in early 16th century, the church belonged to the Armenian Apostolic Church until it was shut down and confiscated by the Soviet authorities in the 1930s, later serving as a library. After the collapse of the Soviet Union, the church was consecrated by Georgian Orthodox clergy as an Orthodox church in 1995, while Armenian traces were removed from in and around the church. Armenian protests eventually led to it being closed indefinitely.

More controversy around the church arose in 2008 when a Georgian priest built a fence around the church and attempted to remove some of the Armenian gravestones. It is one of the several defunct Armenian churches in Tbilisi that the Armenian Church has unsuccessfully sought to return to use in the post-Soviet period.

== History ==
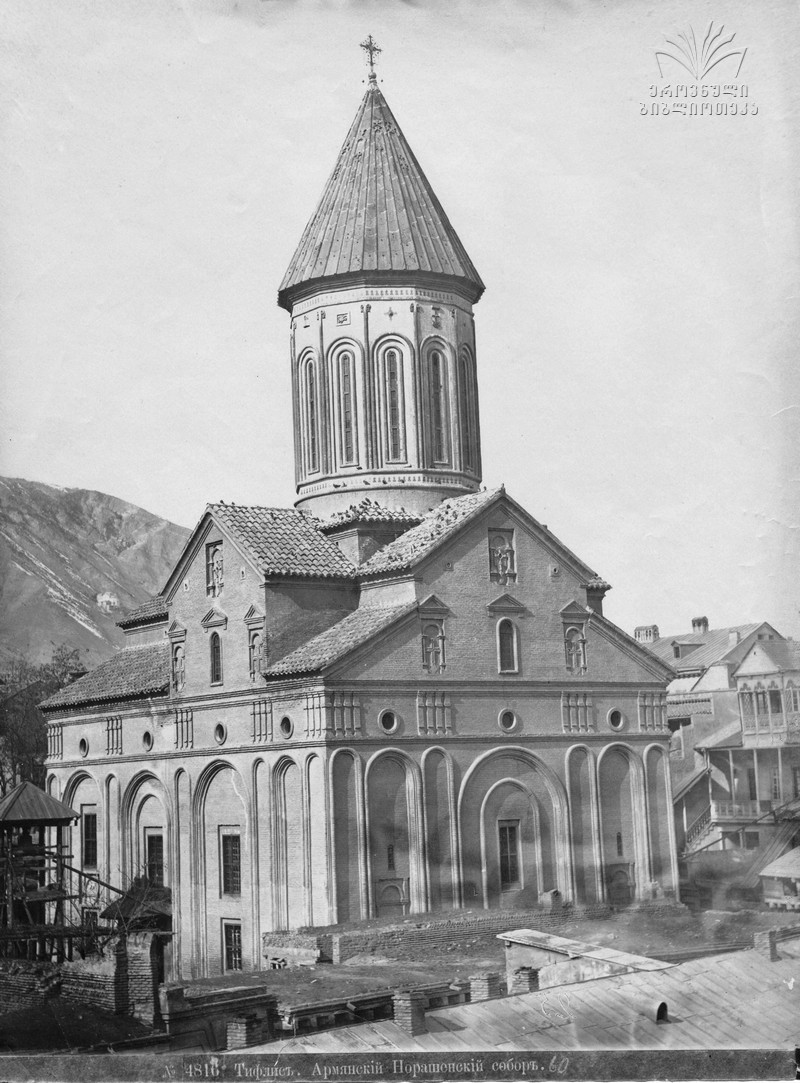
Photo by Dmitri Yermakov.

The church was built in 1467-1507 by a wealthy Armenian noble named Satat’ (Սատաթ), who probably held the title of a paron (baron). He devoted it to the memory of his grandfather, father, his wife, their three sons and himself. The church was renovated in 1650, through funding by Khoja Nazar of New Julfa who erected a khachkar, embedded into the interior wall a year earlier, in 1649. The church's frescoes were painted by Hovnatan Hovnatanian of the prominent Hovnatanian family in 1793. The church was greatly damaged in 1795 during the Persian invasion of Tbilisi by Agha Mohammad Khan Qajar. Melik Avetik, of the Behbudian (Bebutashvili) family, ordered a complete renovation of the church in 1795 that likely lasted until 1808.

The church underwent several more renovations through the 19th century, in 1830–1835, 1857, and 1897, and 1899. A boys' and girls' schools were established at the church in 1858 and 1866, respectively. Like many other places of worship, Norashen was one of the Armenian churches in Tbilisi shut down by the Soviet authorities on December 22, 1933. As of 1972 the church housed a scientific library of the Georgian SSR Academy of Sciences. According to Samvel Karapetyan, some changes were made to the church in 1983 when the area was undergoing renovation. Employees of the Division of Monuments Preservation, under the supervision of Shota Kavlashvili, Tbilisi's chief architect, reportedly removed the church's northern portal as a "redundancy" and some Armenian tombstones disappeared.

== Controversies ==
The church was historically an Armenian Apostolic church; it was mentioned as such by French traveler Jean Chardin in 1673 and by Georgian scholar Egnati Ioseliani in 1837. However, since the last years of Soviet rule, some Georgian scholars, officials, and, most notably, the Georgian Orthodox Church have disputed the ownership of the church. As early as 1989 Jansouk Babounashvili, Deputy Director of the Department of Monuments Preservation of Georgia, declared Norashen to be a Georgian Orthodox church built in the 13th century. Bondo Arveladze, a Georgian historian, claimed Norashen was "illegally built by Armenians on the ruins of an Orthodox church" since there are no documents in the archives "authorizing its construction issued by the tsar or the patriarch of that time.” On the other hand, Sozar Subari, Georgia's Ombudsman, noted in 2006 that it is common knowledge that Norashen is an Armenian church and Armenian claims for return are rightful.

In their 2005 report on the state of religious freedom in Georgia, the U.S. Department of State noted that "many problems among traditional religious groups stem from property disputes" and that the "prominent Armenian church in Tbilisi, Norashen, remains closed." According to a 2011 news report by RFE/RL Norashen is the "biggest source of Georgian-Armenian tensions." According to Blauvelt and Berglund the Georgian government does not return Norashen to the Armenian Church because "officials did not dare to challenge" the Georgian Orthodox Church. As of 2008, it was owned by the Ministry of Economy, while the Ministry of Culture was responsible for maintenance. As of 2016 the church had a status of cultural heritage. Beka Mindiashvili, a Georgian theologian, has criticized the indecision on the part of the authorities as a relic of the Soviet legacy.

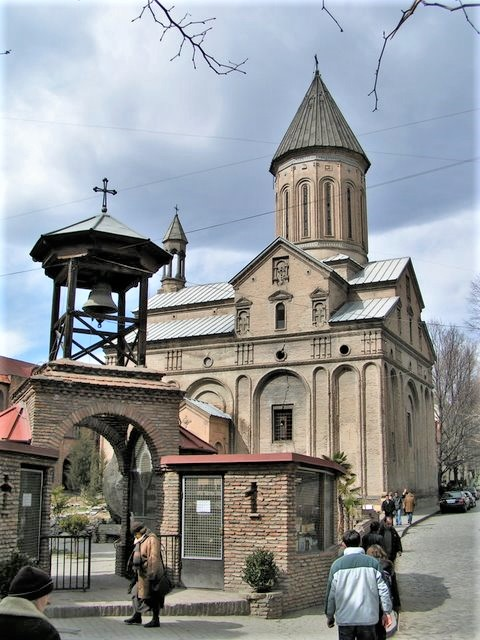
The church in 2007

=== "Georganization" efforts ===
==== 1994–95 alterations ====
In November 1994 books began to be taken out of the church. Teodoros Jokhadze, secretary of Patriarch Ilia II of Georgia, declared that the existence of an Armenian church in the proximity of the Tbilisi Sioni Cathedral was not acceptable and that it should me "made Georgian." On February 15, 1995 Georgian Orthodox clergy consecrated the church according to Georgian church rituals and declared its new name: Khareba ("Annunciation" or "Our Lady of Good News"; Georgian: ყოვლადწმიდა ღვთისმშობლის ხარების სახელობის ეკლესია, k’ovladtsmida ghvtismshoblis kharebis sakhelobis ek’lesia). Archbishop Torkom Manoogian, locum tenens of the Armenian Catholicos, expressed his concerns with the move in a letter to Georgia's President Eduard Shevardnadze and Patriarch Ilia II. A month later, in March 1995, Armenian Church figures visited Tbilisi upon invitation of the local Armenian community, who protested the move. The delegation met with Patriarch Ilia II and the parties agreed to close the church for an indefinite period and create a committee to study the ownership of disputed churches.

In 1994–95, several alterations were made to the church. Armenian sources accuse the Georgian Church and Georgian authorities in erasing the church's Armenian traces and elements. For instance, the bema (elevated platform) was reportedly lowered, khachkars embedded into the walls were removed, Armenian inscriptions and frescoes were erased. Samvel Karapetyan of the Research on Armenian Architecture (RAA) argued that the Georgian authorities have systematically removed Armenian characteristics from the church. According to Karapetyan the baptistery located near the internal northern wall was destroyed, while the old doors were replaced with new ones featuring a Georgian-style cross. A tombstone located near the northern entrance of the church was paved with asphalt.

==== 2005 and 2008 controversies ====
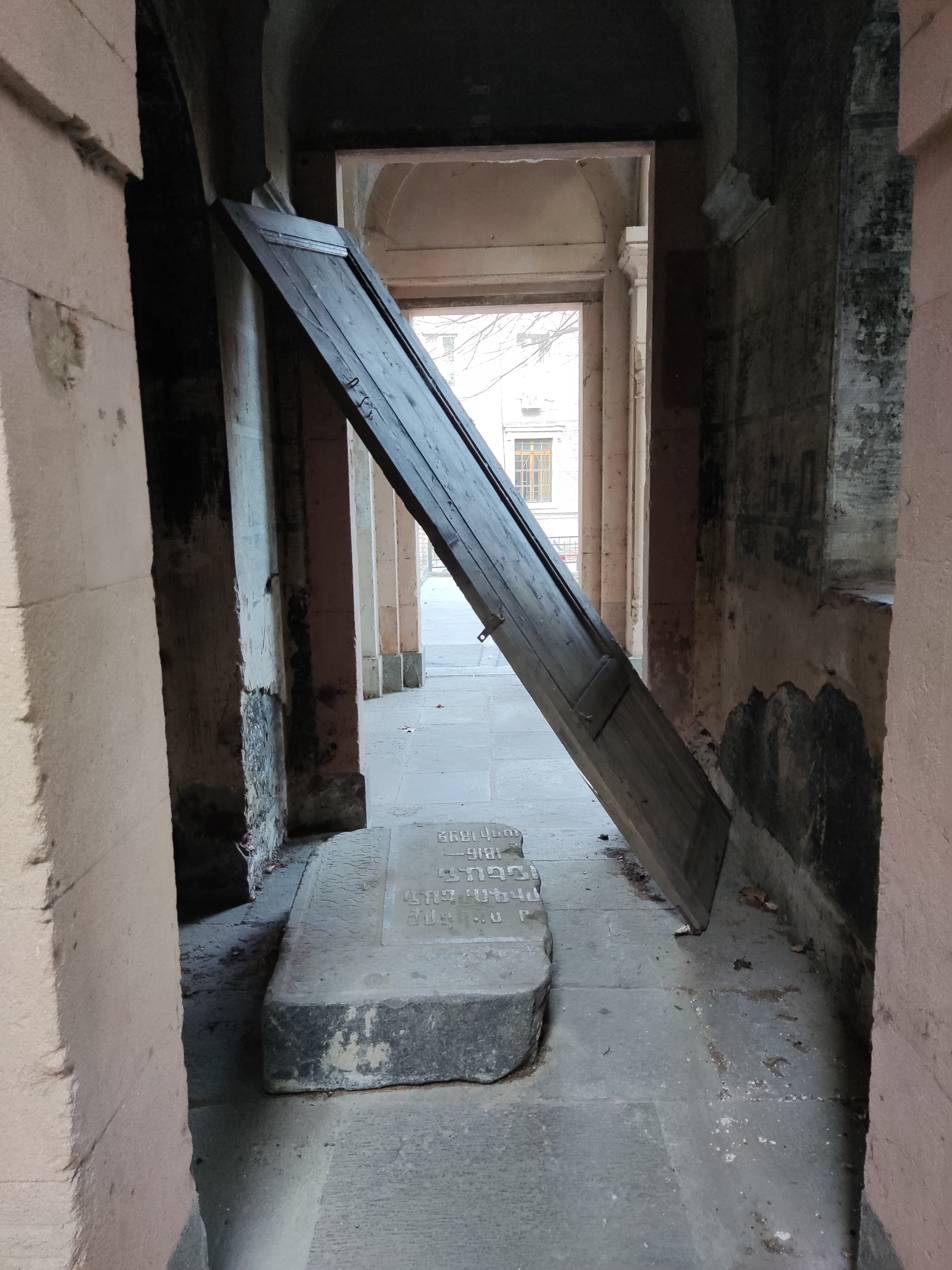
The main entrance of Norashen in 2023

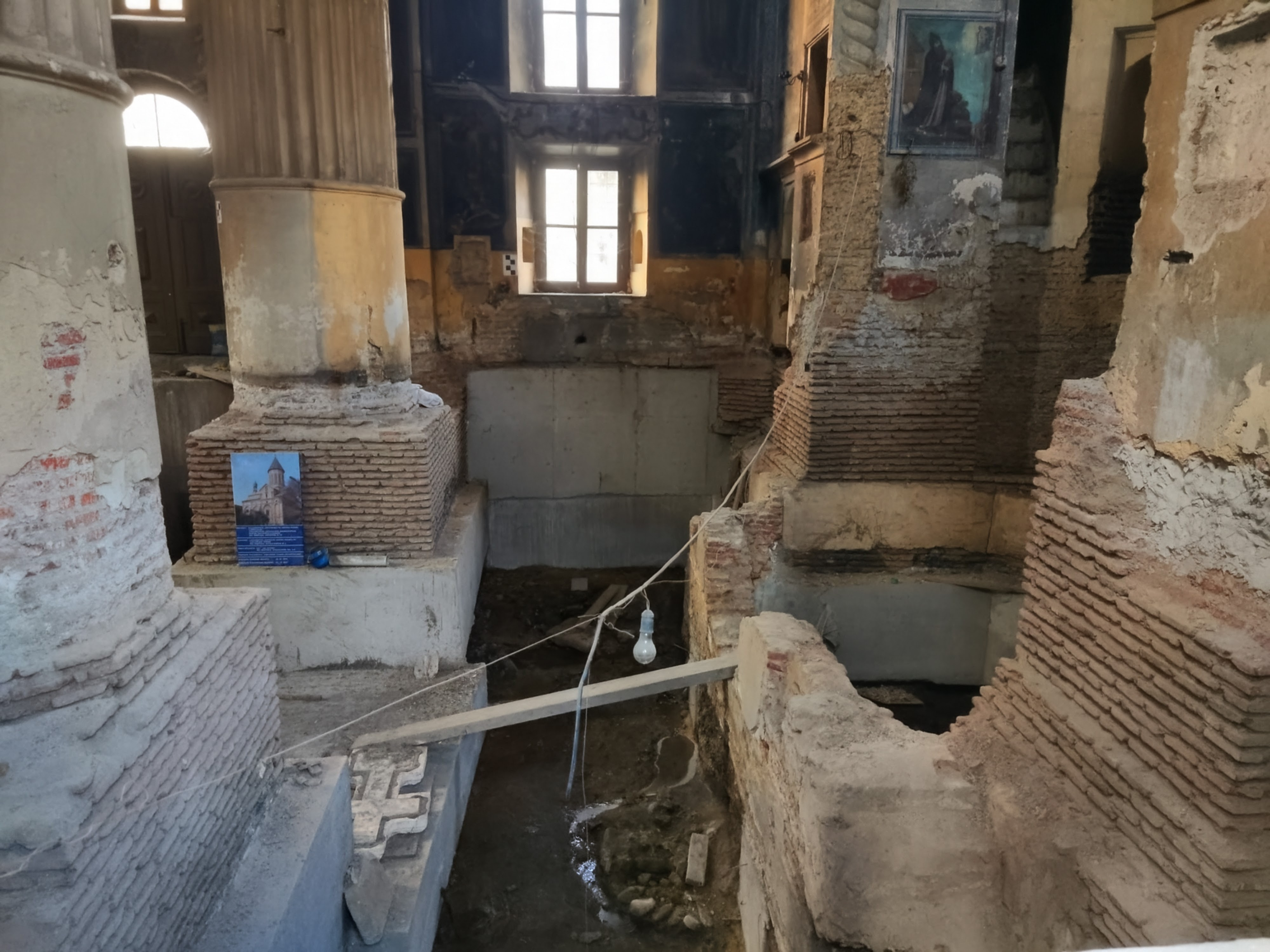
The interior in 2023

In the spring of 2005 Father Tariel Sikinchelashvili, the priest of the neighboring Jvaris Mama Orthodox Church, moved Georgian tombstones into the yard of Norashen. They were placed near the southern wall of the church. Meanwhile, the tombstones that contained Armenian inscriptions were vandalized. According to Samvel Karapetyan's research, at least one gravestone of an individual who died in 1874 was brought by Father Tariel from Dusheti, where he had been a priest before moving to Tbilisi. Karapetyan noted that the priest, thus, sought to "Georganize" the church. Father Tariel declared during the controversy: "The land is ours, the church is ours and we do whatever we want and what we are told to do."

In mid-May 2008 Father Tariel ordered a concrete-metal fence and gates to be built around Norashen. The fence is decorated with symbols characteristic to the Georgian Church. Father Tariel also claimed at the time that Georgian liturgy "will start no later than in a month after all interior repairs inside the building itself finish." The Armenian Church diocese in Georgia protested the move. The municipality of Tbilisi made a decision to remove the fencing, however, it was not carried out.

On November 16, 2008 Father Tariel attempted to remove the gravestones of Mikayel and Lidia Tamamshyans (Tamashev) with the help of a bulldozer. Protests by the Armenian community were successful in returning the gravestones to their original sites. The incident was widely covered in Armenia. The Armenian Church criticized the Georgian priest and called on Georgian authorities to return the church. Vardan Astsatryan, the head of the Armenian government's department on national minorities and religion, called it an act of vandalism. A protest was held in front of Georgia's embassy in Yerevan. Armenian parliament speaker Hovik Abrahamyan expressed his concerns with the issue to Georgia's ambassador to Armenia.

On December 8, 2008 Armenia's Prime Minister Tigran Sargsyan, government ministers, Armenian clergy prayed inside the church in what became the first Armenian prayer in Norashen since the 1930s.

=== Later developments ===
In 2014 the Georgian National Agency for the Preservation of Cultural Heritage made a decision to restore the church. It was funded by the Foundation for the Preservation of Georgian Historical Monuments. In total, some 504,000 lari was spent on its renovation. The restoration works were carried out in 2015-16 and were aimed at strengthening its walls and dome. Furthermore, the old doors and windows were replaced with new ones and the original Armenian gravestones were returned.

== Gallery ==
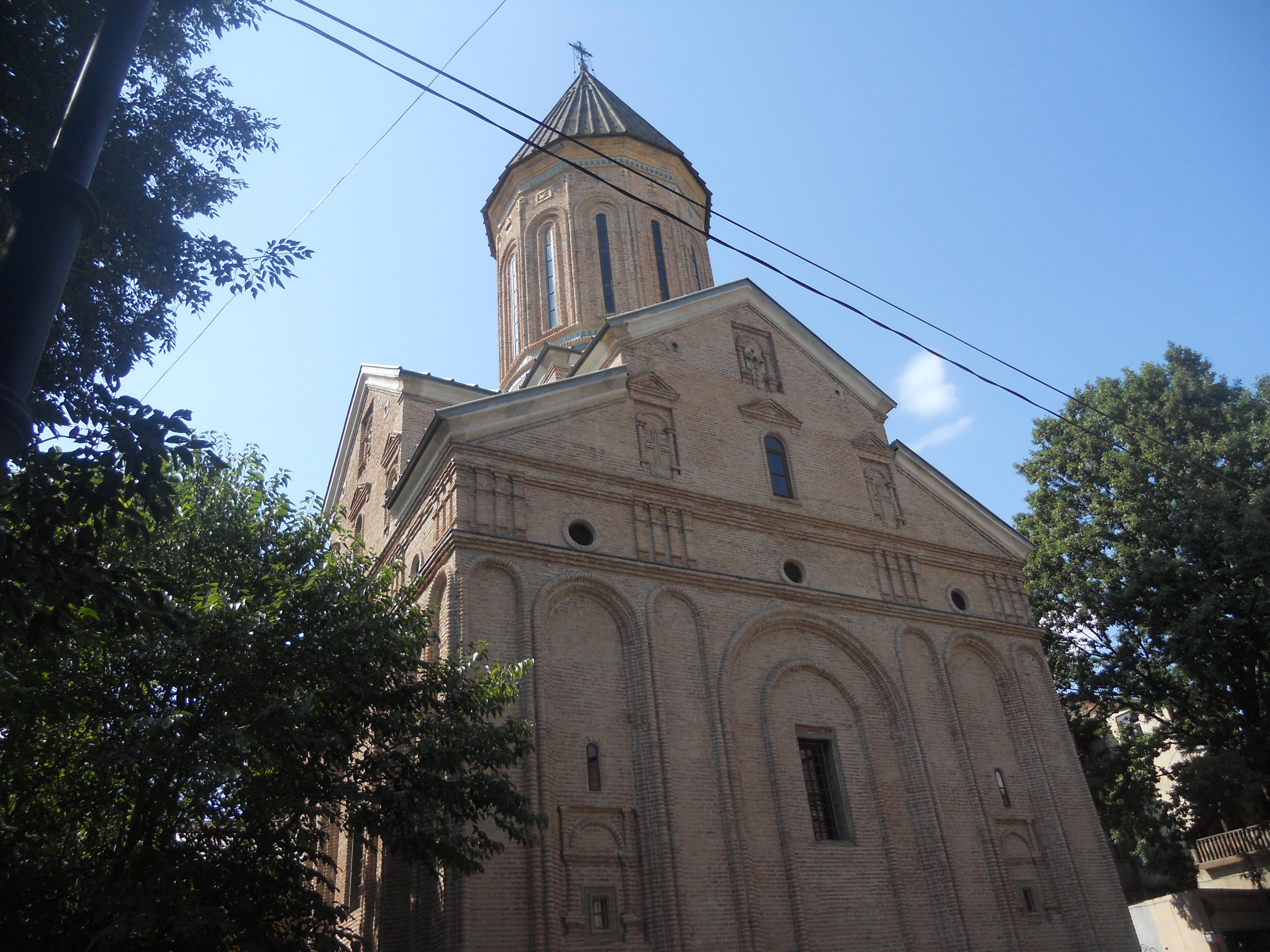

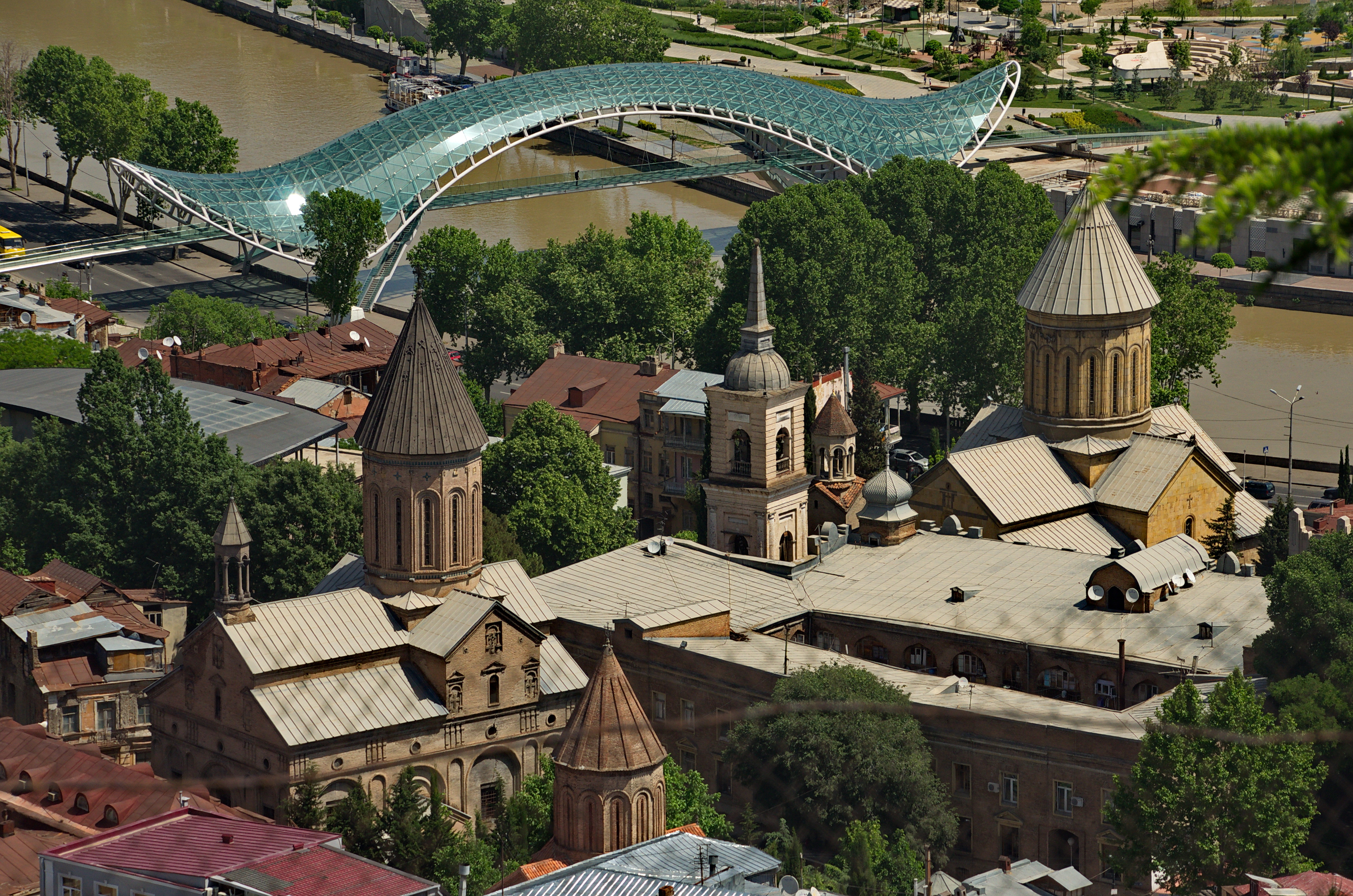

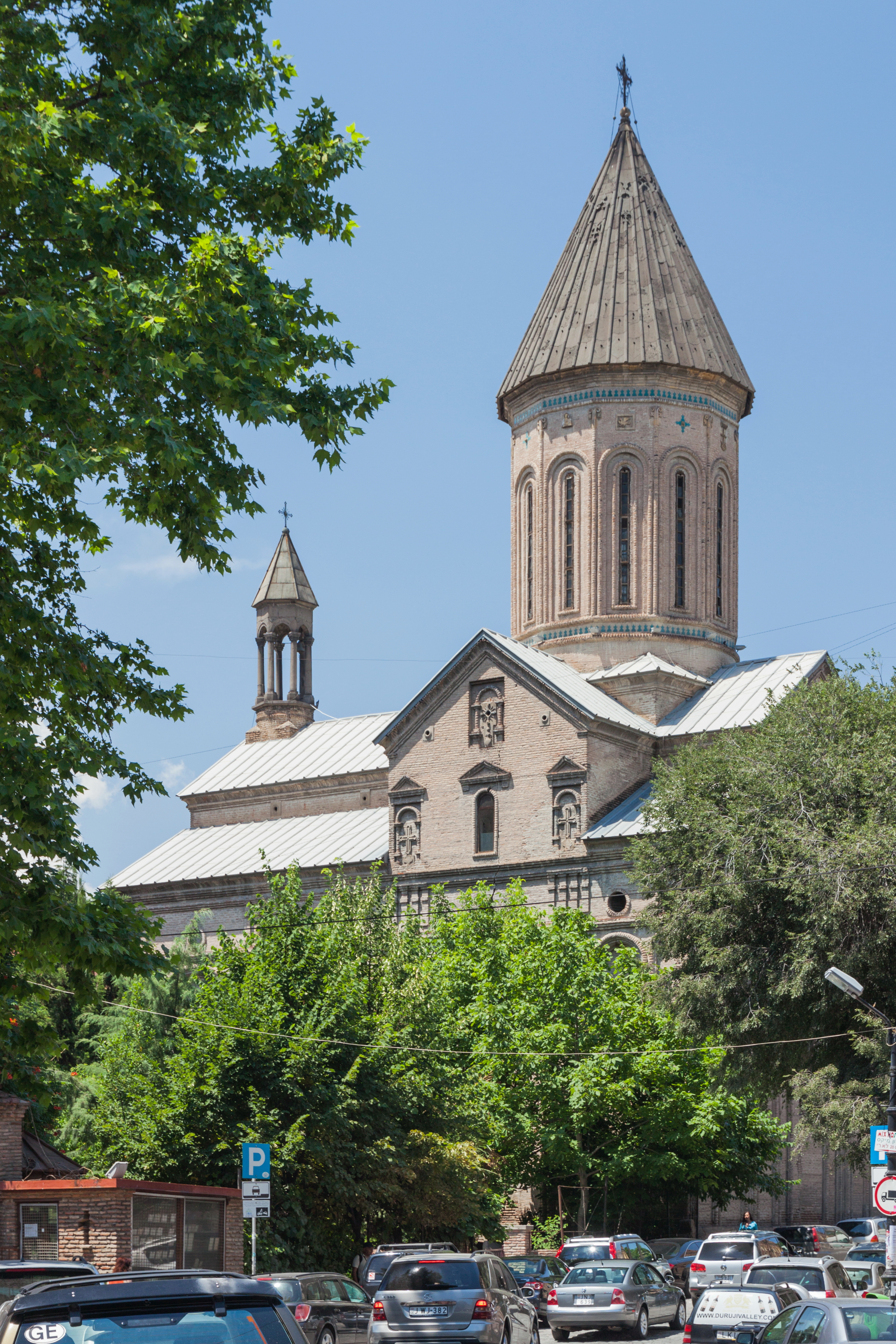

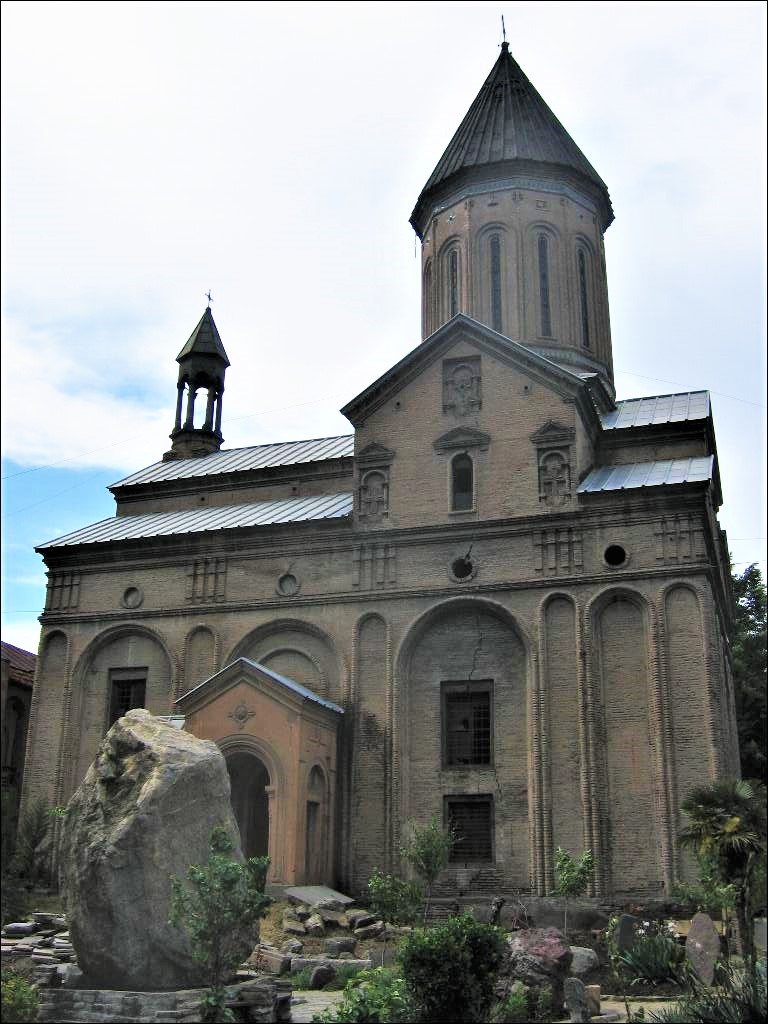

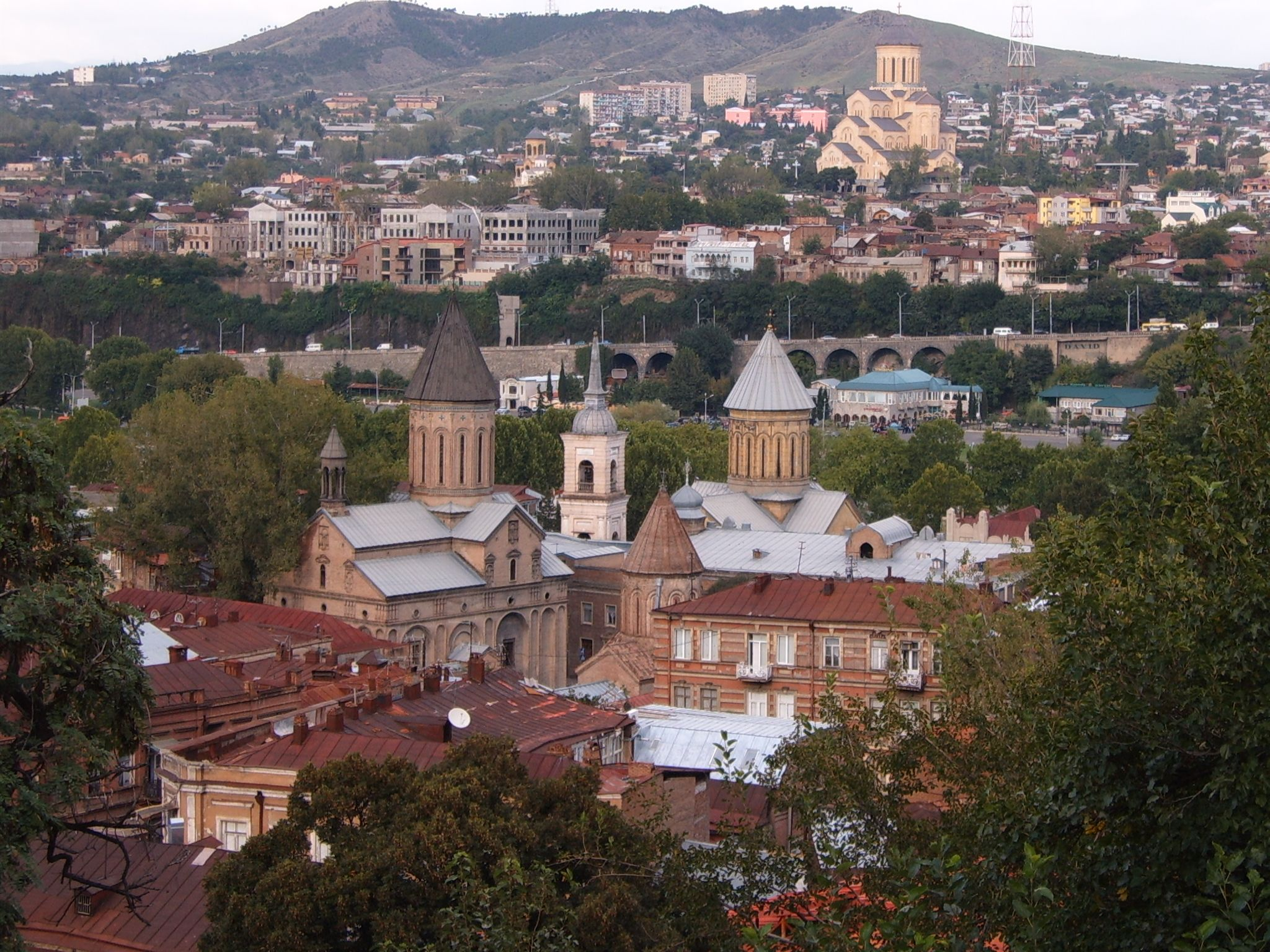

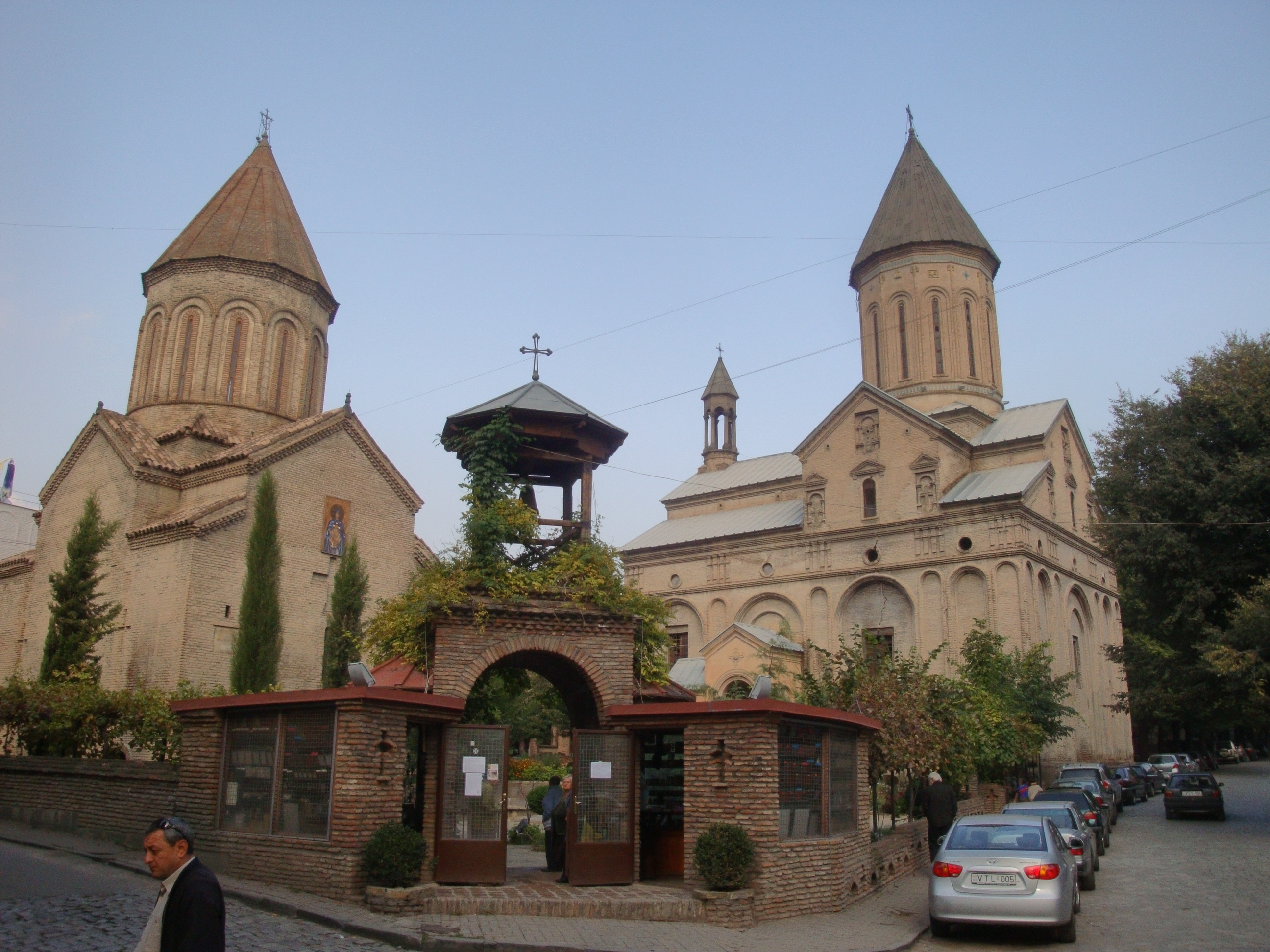

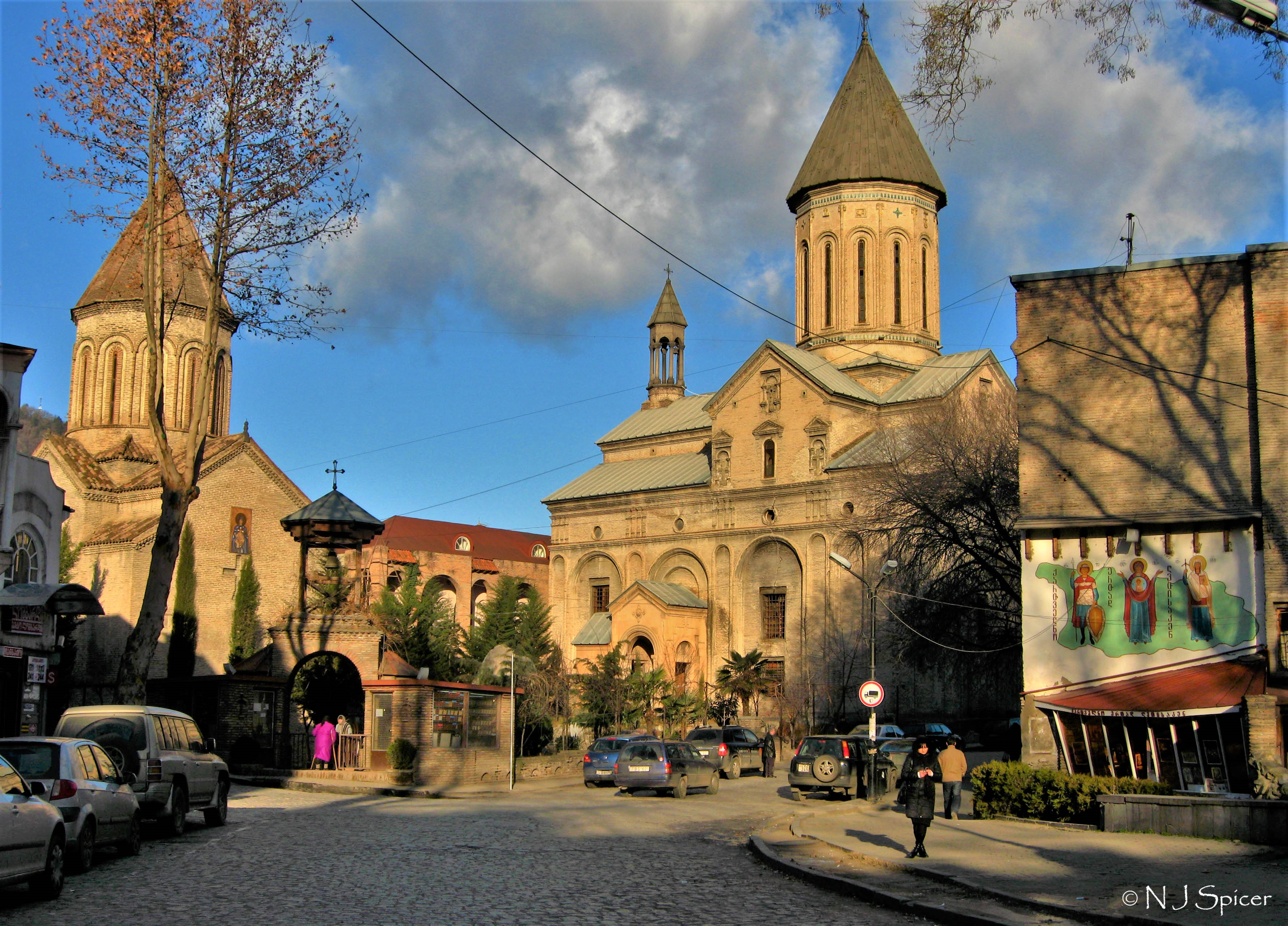

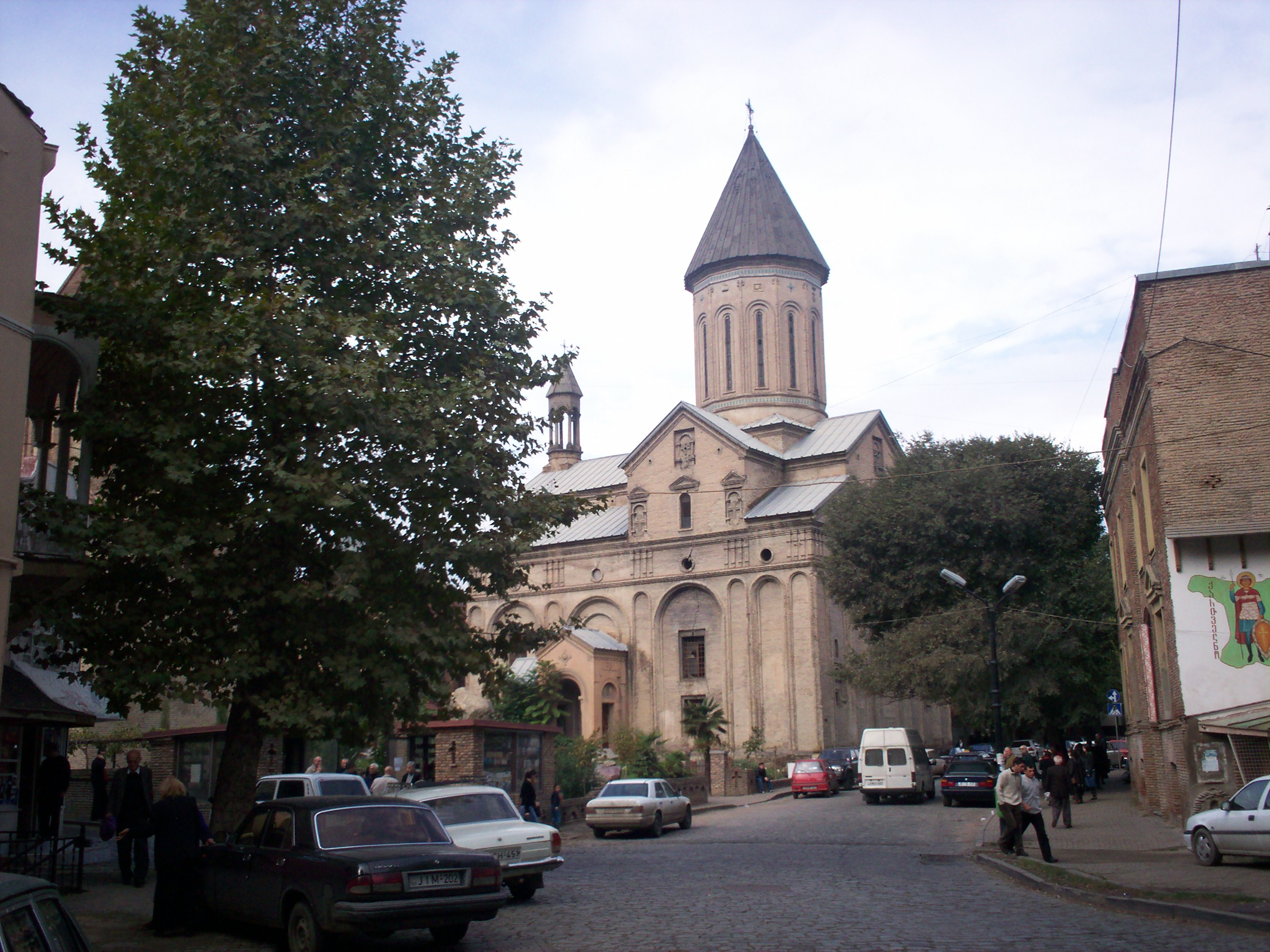

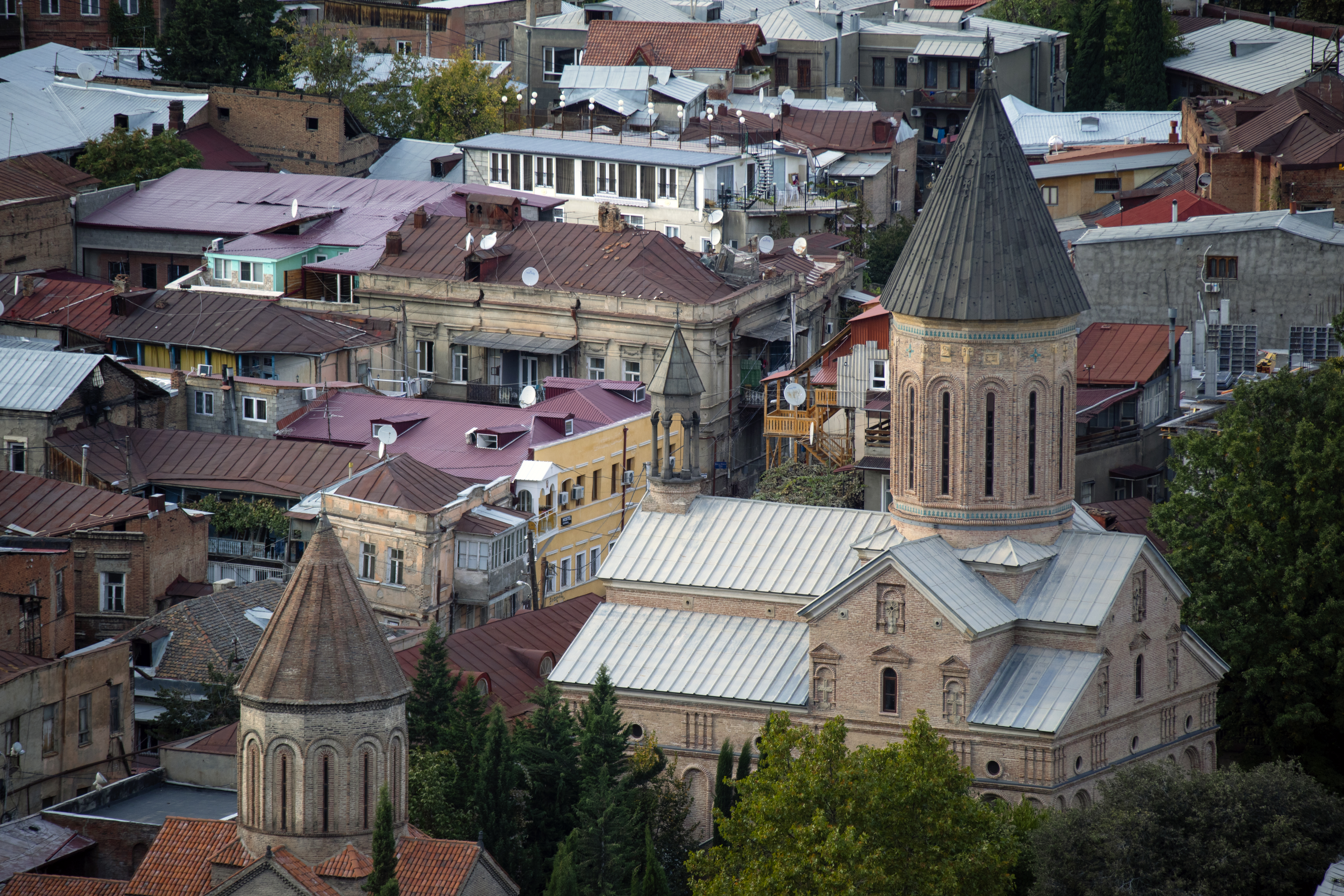

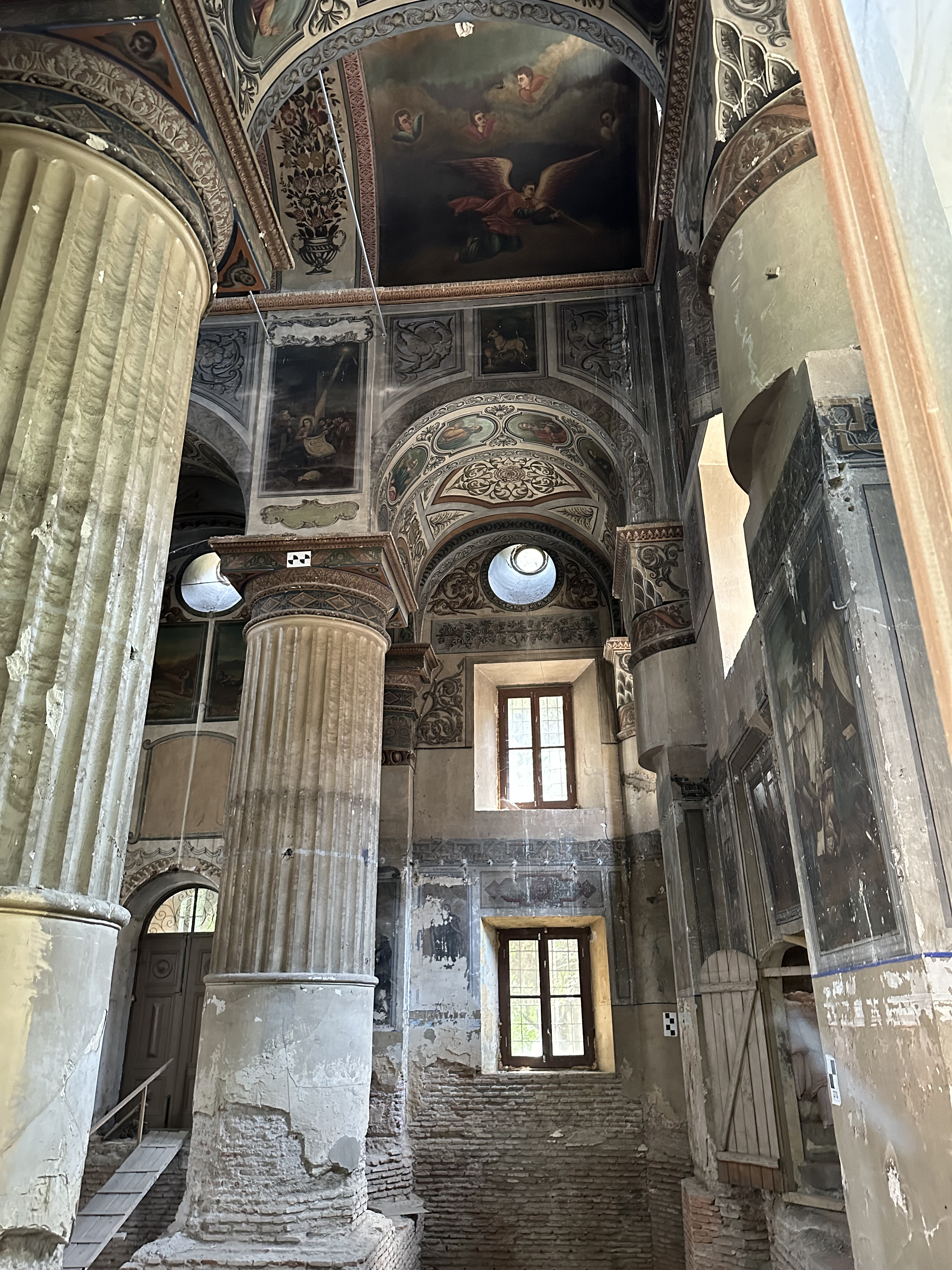

== See also ==
- Armenians in Georgia
- List of Armenian churches in Tbilisi
