= Xincab =

- Municipality
- Location within Azerbaijan
- Coordinates: 39°23′56″N 45°16′34″E
- Country: Azerbaijan
- Autonomous republic: Nakhchivan
- District: Kangarli

Population (2005)
  - Total: 619
- Time zone: UTC+4 (AZT)

Xincab (also, Khindzhab, Khyndzhav, and Khynozhov) is a village and municipality in the Kangarli District of Nakhchivan, Azerbaijan. It is located 14 km in the north-east from the district center, on the foothills area. Its population is busy with grain-growing and animal husbandry. There are secondary school, club library and a medical center in the village. It has a population of 619.

== Etymology ==
The name of the Xincab was created from the same named hydronym. Hydronym was made out from the Persian words of xinq or xınq (gray, gloomy, blurred) and ab (water) means "turbid water, murky river". The village is named like that because it was situated on the bank of muddy water ditch that existed in the past.
