= Yeni Kərki =

- Municipality
- Location within Azerbaijan
- Coordinates: 39°18′36″N 45°13′18″E
- Country: Azerbaijan
- Autonomous republic: Nakhchivan
- District: Kangarli

Population (2005)
  - Total: 380
- Time zone: UTC+4 (AZT)

Yeni Kərki is a village and the least populous municipality in the Kangarli District of Nakhchivan, Azerbaijan.

It is located near to the Nakhchivan-Sharur highway, 14 km (9 miles) in the north-east from the district center. Its population is mainly busy with animal husbandry. There is a secondary school, club, library and a medical center in the village. It has a population of 380.

== History ==
Yeni Kərki (New Karki) was founded by refugees from the village of Karki in the Sadarak District, which was occupied by Armenia on 19 January 1990, during the First Nagorno-Karabakh War.
