= Karki, Azerbaijan =

De jure exclave of Azerbaijan under the de facto control of Armenia

Karki Kərki
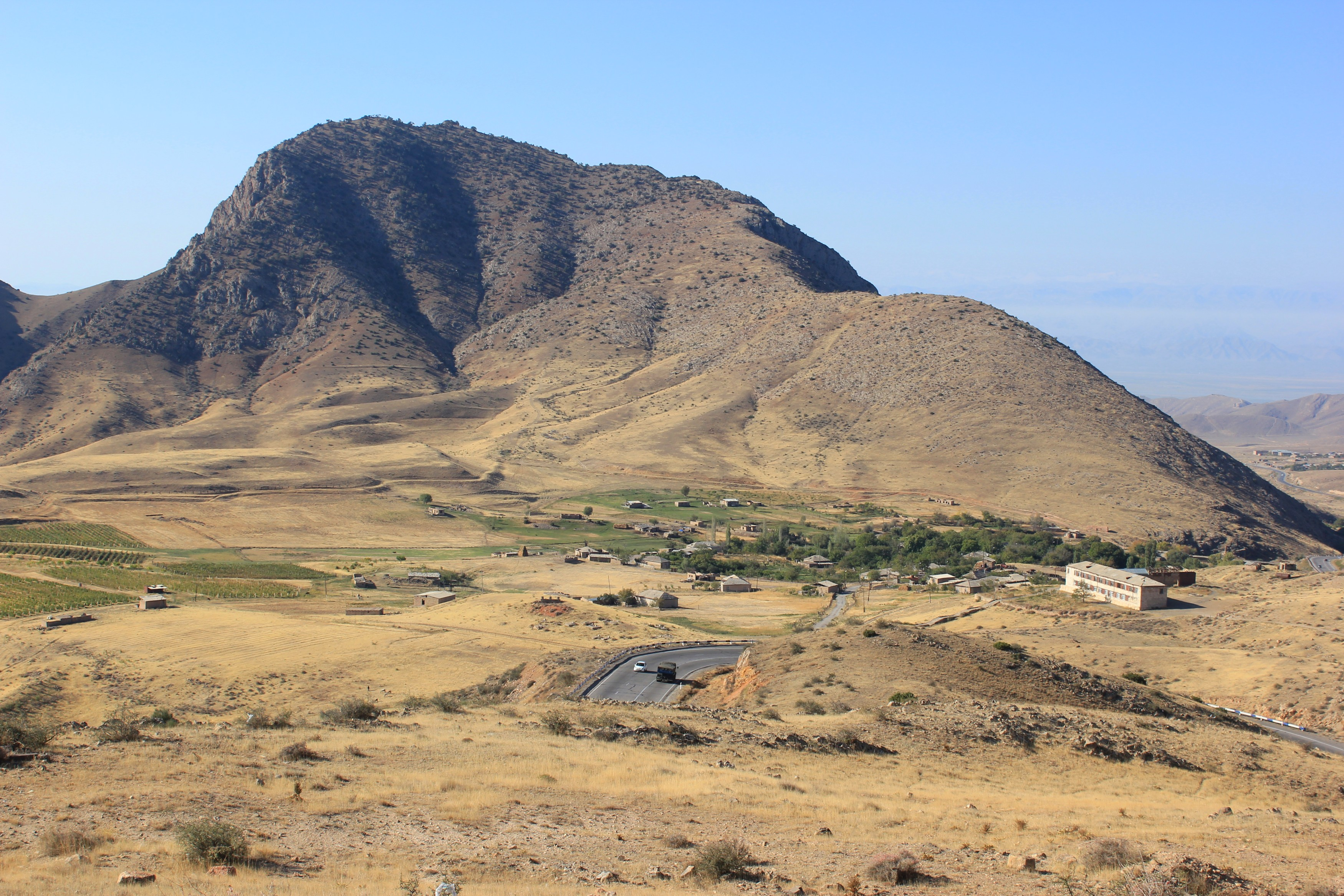

- Location within Azerbaijan Location within Armenia Location within Ararat
- Coordinates: 39°47′08″N 44°56′37″E
- Country (de jure): Azerbaijan
  - District: Sadarak
- Country (de facto): Armenia
  - Province: Ararat
  - Municipality: Ararat

Area
  - Total: 8.23 km^{2} (3.18 sq mi)

Population (2011)
  - Total: 154
- Time zone: UTC+4 (AZT)

Karki (Azerbaijani: Kərki) or Tigranashen (Armenian: Տիգրանաշեն) is a village that is de jure an enclave and exclave of Azerbaijan, de facto under the control of Armenia, administered within the Ararat Municipality of the Ararat Province. The main highway connecting northern Armenia with southern Armenia passes right by the village. Today the village is mostly inhabited by Armenians, both locals and refugees from Azerbaijan.

== Geography ==
The village is located on the bank of the Akhuryan River near the Yerevan–Jermuk highway, which is 15 kilometres (9.3 mi) away from the district centre. The area of the village itself is 822 hectares (2,030 acres).

== History ==
The village was captured by Armenian forces on 19 January 1990, during the First Nagorno-Karabakh War.

Since May 1992, following the First Nagorno-Karabakh War, Karki has been controlled by Armenia, which governs the 8.23 km^{2} (3.18 sq mi) territory as part of its Ararat Province.

After the war, many of the former inhabitants of Karki resettled in a new village, Yeni Kərki (New Karki), created within the Kangarli District of Azerbaijan.

== Demographics ==
According to the 1910 publication of Kavkazskiy kalendar, Karki (Кярки) had a predominantly Tatar (Note: Before 1918, Azerbaijanis were generally known as "Tatars". This term, employed by the Russians, referred to Turkic-speaking Muslims of the South Caucasus. After 1918, with the establishment of the Azerbaijan Democratic Republic and "especially during the Soviet era", the Tatar group identified itself as "Azerbaijani".) population of 244 in 1908. This number increased slightly to 245 in 1911.

The village had a present population of 151, and a permanent population of 154 in 2011.

== Gallery ==
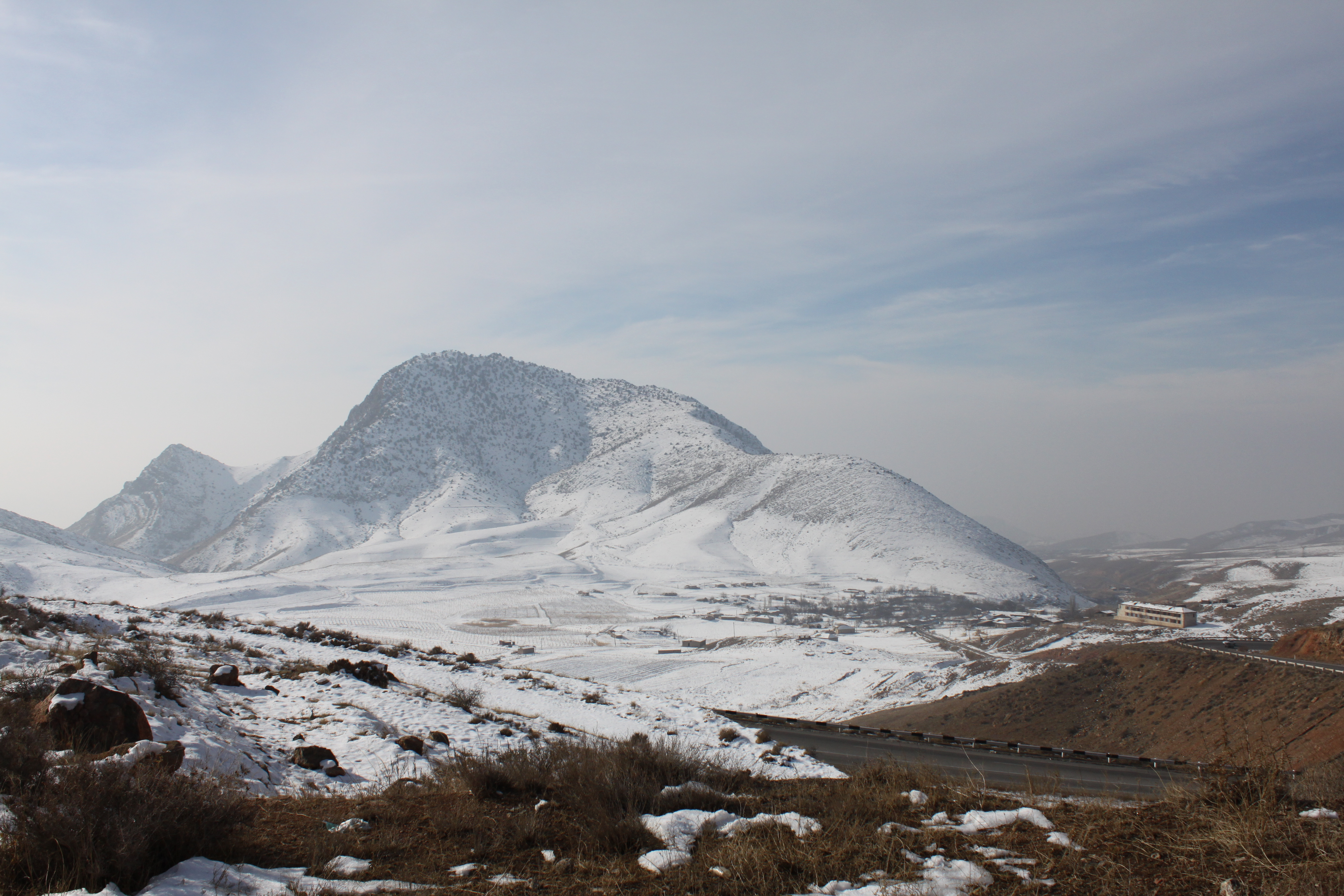
View of the village from north-south Armenian highway.

== See also ==
- Artsvashen
- Barkhudarli
- Yukhari Askipara
- Ashagi Askipara
- Yeni Kərki
- Sofulu, Qazakh

== Bibliography ==
- Bournoutian, George A. (2018). Armenia and Imperial Decline: The Yerevan Province, 1900–1914. Milton Park, Abingdon, Oxon: Routledge. ISBN 978-1-351-06260-2. OCLC 1037283914.
- Кавказский календарь на 1910 год [Caucasian calendar for 1910] (in Russian) (65th ed.). Tiflis: Tipografiya kantselyarii Ye.I.V. na Kavkaze, kazenny dom. 1910. Archived from the original on 15 March 2022.
- Кавказский календарь на 1912 год [Caucasian calendar for 1912] (in Russian) (67th ed.). Tiflis: Tipografiya kantselyarii Ye.I.V. na Kavkaze, kazenny dom. 1912. Archived from the original on 11 December 2021.
- Tsutsiev, Arthur (2014). Atlas of the Ethno-Political History of the Caucasus (PDF). Translated by Nora Seligman Favorov. New Haven: Yale University Press. ISBN 9780300153088. Archived (PDF) from the original on 17 June 2023.
