= Aznabyurt =

- Location within Azerbaijan
- Coordinates: 39°26′40″N 45°16′43″E
- Country: Azerbaijan
- Autonomous republic: Nakhchivan
- District: Kangarli
- Time zone: UTC+4 (AZT)

Aznabyurt (also, Aznabirt and Aznaburt) is a village in the Kangarli District of the Nakhchivan Autonomous Republic of Azerbaijan. It was originally an Armenian village called Znaberd, which remained Armenian until 1989.
