= Qabıllı =

- Municipality
- Location within Azerbaijan
- Coordinates: 39°25′42″N 45°06′46″E
- Country: Azerbaijan
- Autonomous republic: Nakhchivan
- District: Kangarli

Population (2005)
  - Total: 1,079
- Time zone: UTC+4 (AZT)

Qabıllı (also, Qarabullu, Gabylly, Gabullu and Kabullu) is a village and municipality in the Kangarli District of Nakhchivan, Azerbaijan. It is located in the near of the Sharur-Nakhchivan highway, 6 km away from the district center. Its population is busy with grain-growing, vegetable-growing, fodder and animal husbandry. There are secondary school, cultural house and a medical center in the village. It has a population of 1,079.

== Etymology ==
The village's name is believed to be related with the name of the Gabullu tribe, one of the arms of the Turkic Kengerli tribe.
