= Qıvraq =

- Municipality
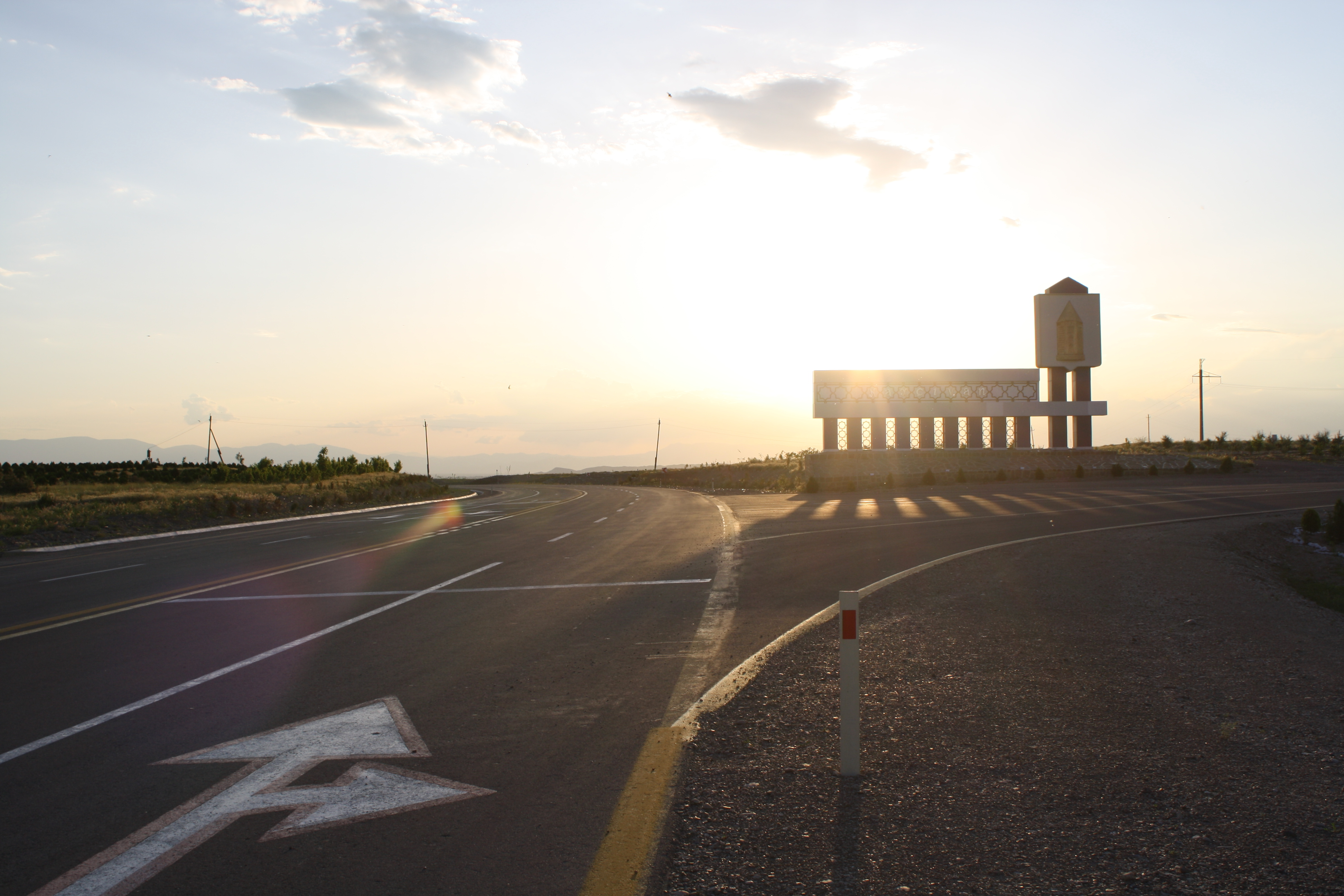
- Road to Turkey. Nakhichivan. Azerbaijan.

- Location within Azerbaijan
- Coordinates: 39°23′59″N 45°06′47″E
- Country: Azerbaijan
- Autonomous republic: Nakhchivan
- District: Kangarli

Population (2008)
  - Total: 4,444
- Time zone: UTC+4 (AZT)

Qıvraq (also, Givrakh, Kivrag, Kivrakh, Kyvrak, and Kyvrakh) is a village and municipality in, and is the administrative center of, the Kangarli District of Nakhchivan, Azerbaijan. It has a population of 4,444.
