= Armen Hakhnazarian =

Iranian architect (1941–2009)

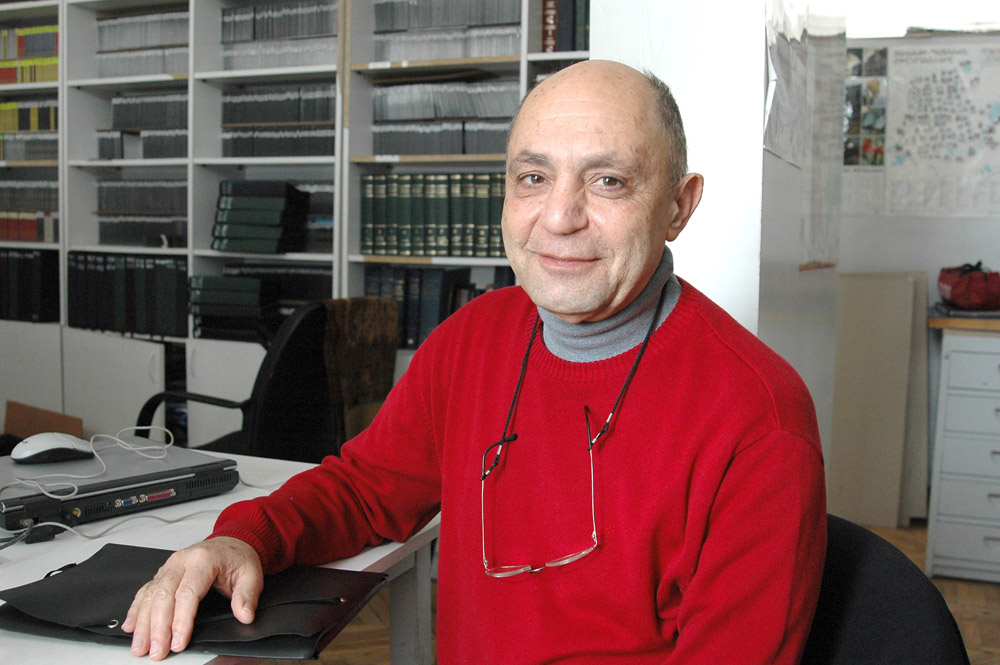
- Armen Hakhnazarian
- Born: May 5, 1941; Tehran, Imperial State of Iran
- Died: February 19, 2009 (aged 67); Aachen, Germany
- Occupation: Architect

Armen Hakhnazarian (Armenian: Արմեն Հախնազարյան, 5 May 1941, Tehran – 19 February 2009, Aachen) was a Doctor of Architecture, Doctor of Technical Sciences and Founding Director of Research on Armenian Architecture (RAA) NGO.

== Biography ==
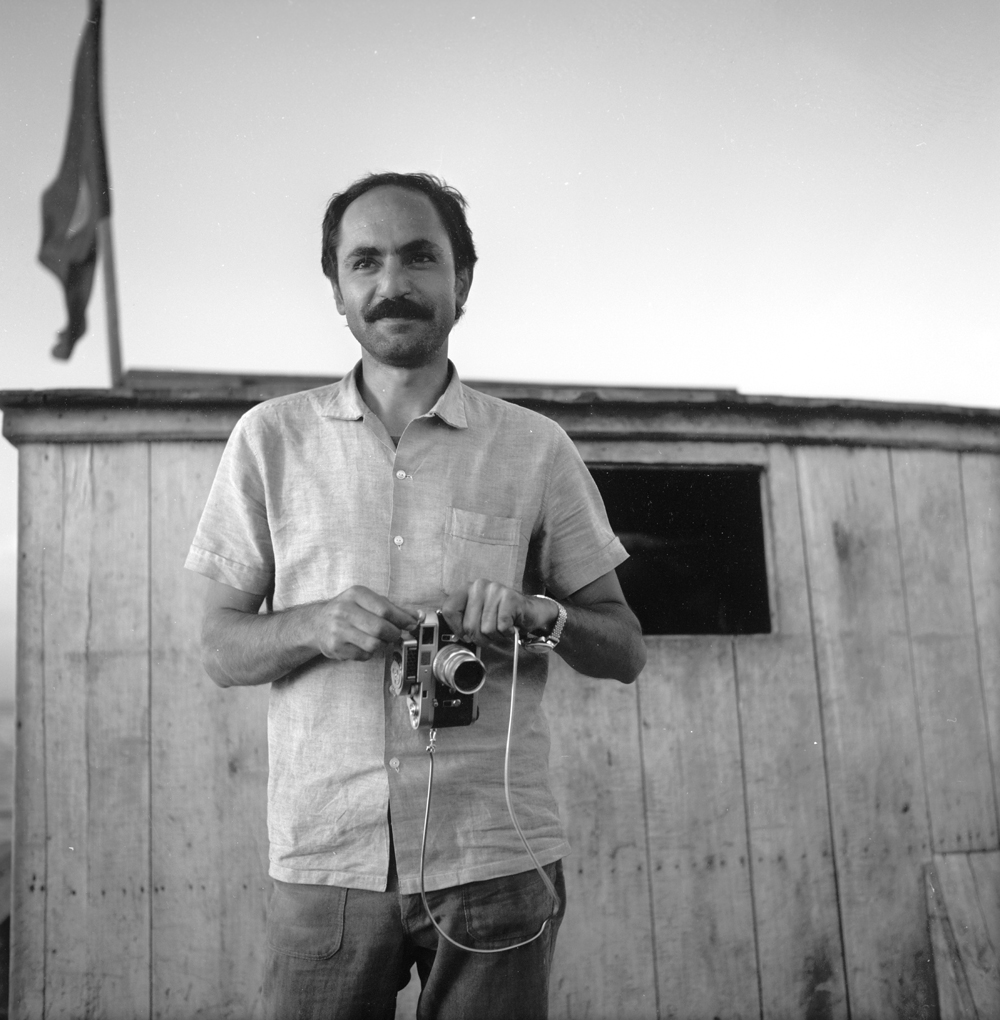
Armen Hakhnazarian

Hakhnazarian was the son of Hovhannes Hakhnazarian, a Doctor of Linguistics, lecturer at University of Tehran and Inspector of the Armenian schools in Tehran, and Arusyak Hakhnazarian, a piano teacher at Tehran State Conservatory.

In 1959 Hakhnazarian completed his studies at Kooshesh Davtian School, Tehran. In 1969 he earned his doctorate in architecture from the Department of Architecture of the Faculty of Architecture and Civil Engineering at RWTH Aachen University of Aachen. In 1973 he graduated from the Department of Urban Planning of the same faculty having earned another doctorate in technical sciences (Doktor der Ingenieurwissenschaften) as an architect-planner.

Hakhnazarian started his research activities in 1968, when he embarked on measuring St. Thaddeus Monastery in Artaz District (at present: Maku in West Azerbaijan province, Iran). In the 1970s, Hakhnazarian made six research trips to Western Armenia (at present: Eastern Turkey), each lasting for almost two months. Later, however, he was declared persona non grata and banned from participating in future research trips in Western Armenia. Nevertheless, he continued his studies by sending other researchers to Western Armenia, Armenia Minor and Cilicia up until his untimely death. In 1969 he established Research on Armenian Architecture (RAA) organization (Foundation since 2010) in Aachen, Germany. In 1973 Hakhnazarian married architect Margrit Buenemann. They have two daughters: Tallinn and Shahriz. In 1974 he founded and headed Monit Architectural Company in Tehran, Iran. In 1982 he officially registered Research on Armenian Architecture (RAA) NGO (Foundation since 2010) in Aachen, Germany. In 1996 it was registered in the United States, and in 1998 in Armenia. In 1983 he started teaching in the Faculty of Urban Planning at Aachen University, Germany, his lecturer's career lasting for many years. Hakhnazarian died in Aachen, part of his ashes being buried there and the rest in the cemetery of Artashavan Village, Aragatzotn Region, Armenia.

== Renovation activities ==
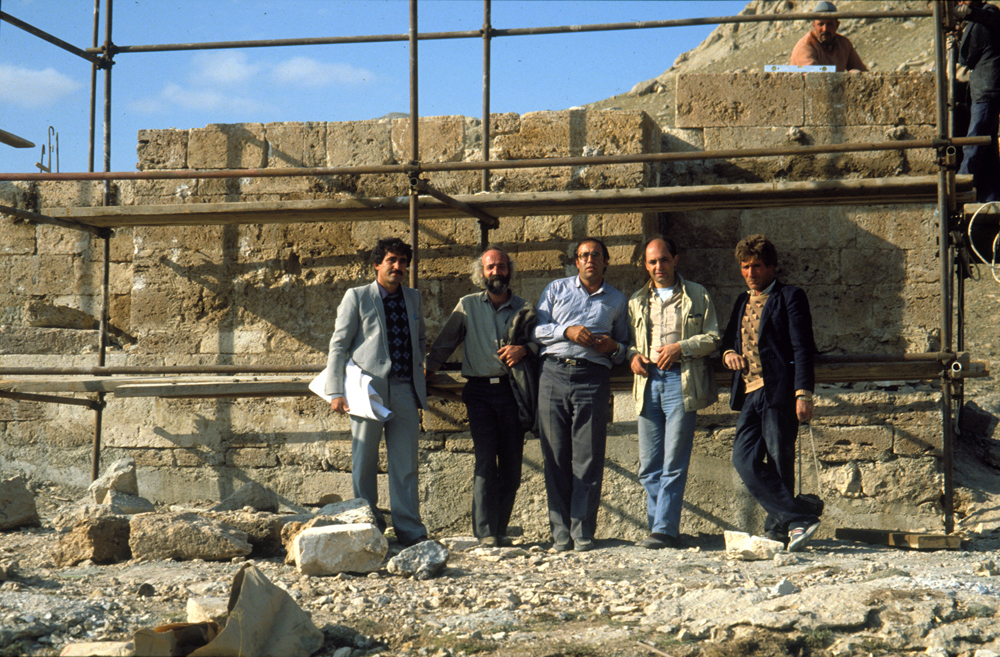
Armen Hakhnazarian

- St. Sargis Church in Vanak Quarter of Tehran, Iran
- Saint George Church of Tehran, Iran
- St. Stepanos Monastery in Jolfa County and St. Thaddeus Monastery in Maku, Iran
- Sourb Astvatzatzin (Holy Virgin) Monastery of Tzortzor, Maku, Iran
- Sourb Astvatzatzin (Holy Virgin) Church in Karintak Village, Shushi District, Artsakh
- Various buildings of Dadivank Monastic Complex, Karvajar District, Artsakh
- St. Minas Church of Tatev Village, Syunik Region, Armenia
- Church of Davit Bek Village, Syunik Region, Armenia
- Saghmosavank Monastery, Aragatzotn Region, Armenia
- The uni-nave church of St. Sargis Monastery in Ushi Village, Aragatzotn Region, Armenia
- St. Stepanos Church of Garaturan Village, Kesab District, Syria
- Several historical houses in Kesab Township, Kesab District, Syria

== Publications ==
- 1983 to 1989 – 7 volumes of microfilms on Armenian Architecture
- Ակնարկ Հայկական ճարտարապետութեան (A Review of Armenian Architecture), 1988
- Documents of Armenian Architecture: Nor Djulfa. Venezia, 1992.
- 2001 - IN COMMEMORATION OF THE RE-CONSECRATION OF SAGHMOSAVANK MONASTERY:
- The Monasteries of St. Thaddeus the Apostle and St. Stepannos Nakhavka:
- 2002 - SAGHMOSAVANK:
- Julfa: The Annihilation of the Armenian Cemetery by Nakhijevan's Azerbaijani Authorities:
- Armenian Cemetery of Jugha Annihilated:
- 2012 - THREE MONASTERIES OF ARTAZ:

== Awards ==
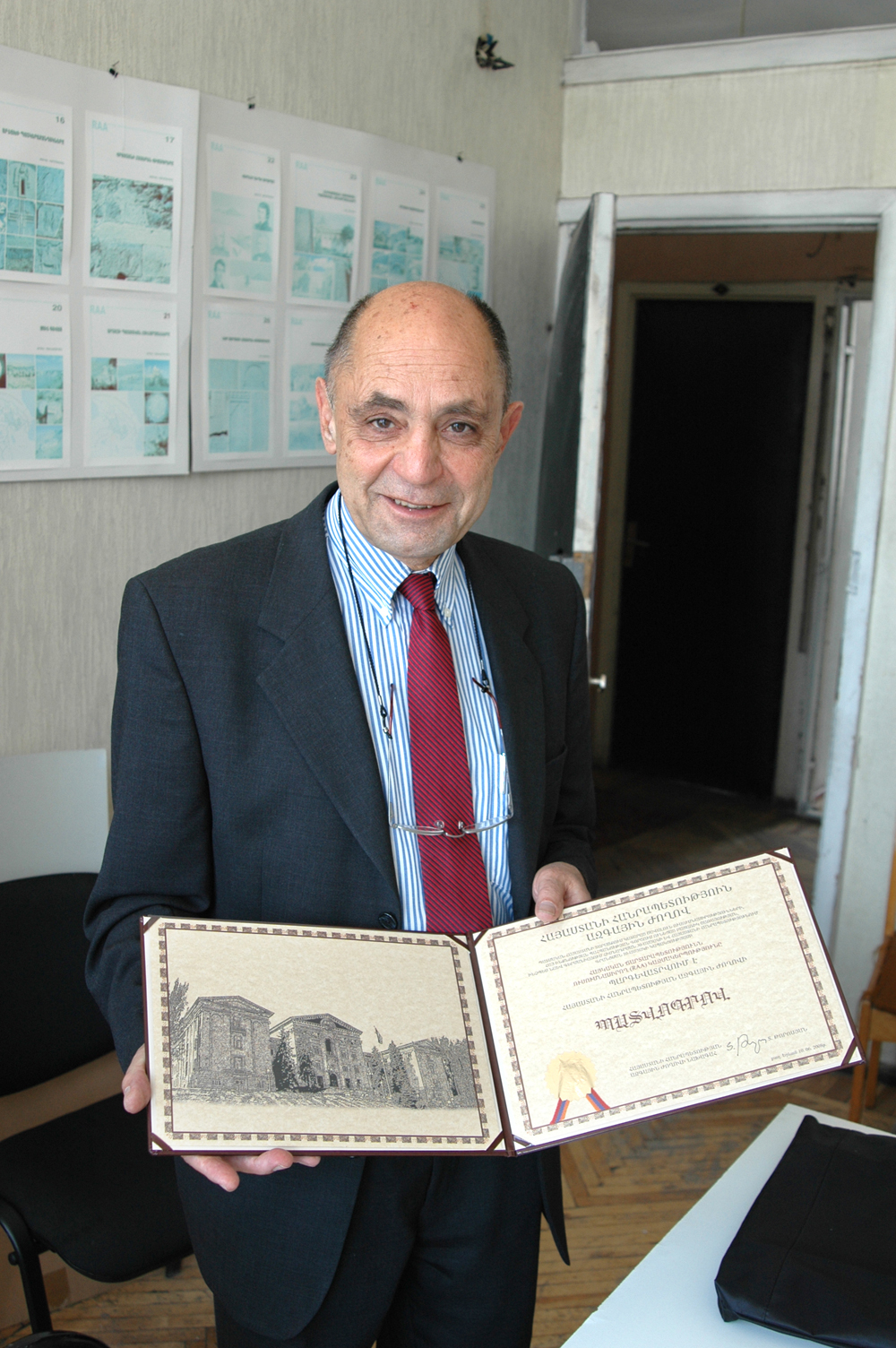
Armen Hakhnazarian

- 10 June 2008 – Order of Honour of the National Assembly of Armenia
- 29 January 2009 – Hakob Meghapart Medal of the National Library of Armenia
- 2009 – Diploma of Honour of the Ministry of Urban Development of Armenia
