= Research on Armenian Architecture =

- Abbreviation: RAA
- Established: 1969
- Type: NGO
- Headquarters: Yerevan
- Website: raa-am.org

Research on Armenian Architecture (RAA) (Armenian: Հայկական ճարտարապետությունն ուսումնասիրող, romanized: Haykakan chartarapetutyunn usumnasirogh) is a non-governmental organization established in Aachen, Germany, in 1969 by Dr. Armen Hakhnazarian and was registered as a non-profit public organization in 1982. In 1996, RAA USA was founded, followed by RAA Armenia in 1998.

Until his death in 2020, Samvel Karapetian was the director of RAA Armenia. Jora Manucharian is currently the chairman of the board of trustees of the foundation, and RAA Armenia is governed by a board of directors: Emma Abrahamian (Samvel's wife), managing director; Raffi Kortoshian, co-director of administration and publications; Ashot Hakobyan, co-director of architectural activities; Armen Gevorgyan, co-director of computers and technology. The RAA maintains its headquarters in Yerevan, while RAA USA is based in Los Angeles.

== Activities ==
Research on Armenian Architecture investigates and documents Armenian monuments located outside the borders of present-day Armenia, namely in historical Armenia (the Armenian districts of Turkey, Iran, Georgia, and Azerbaijan). RAA also carries out studies concerning the Armenian diaspora settlements in Syria, Turkey, Lebanon, India, Russia, etc. During its research activities, RAA has acquired a rich database of 650,000 articles, ranging from digital images and measurements, to plans, maps and archive materials, becoming the basis of numerous scientific works intended not only for Armenians but also for the international community.

== See also ==
- Armenian architecture
