= Samvel Karapetyan (author) =

Armenian historian (1961–2020)

- Սամվել Կարապետյան
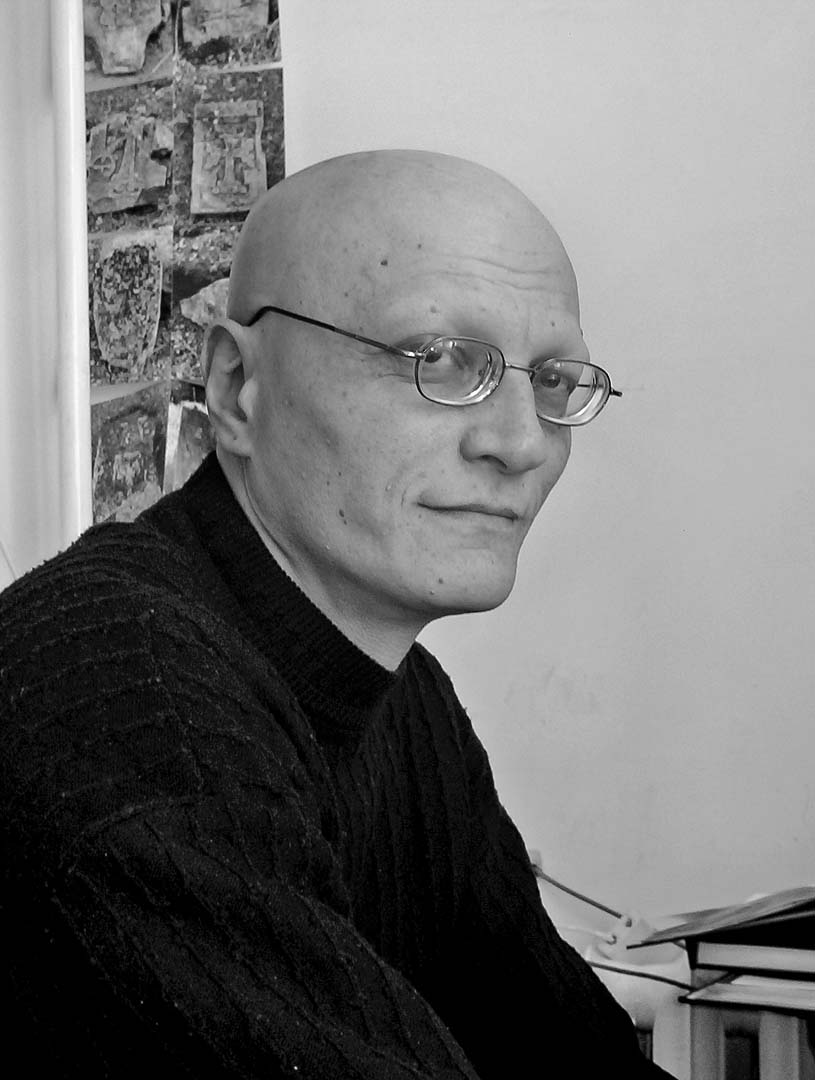
- Karapetyan in 2002
- Born: 30 July 1961
- Died: 27 February 2020 (aged 58)
- Occupation: Historian

Samvel Karapetian (Armenian: Սամվել Կարապետյան; 30 July 1961 – 27 February 2020) was an Armenian historian, researcher, author, and expert of medieval architecture, specializing in the study of the historical monuments of Armenia, Nagorno-Karabakh and other regions of the Southern Caucasus.

== Research work ==
Karapetian surveyed and catalogued thousands of artifacts of Armenian history and architecture during the course of more than two decades. Karapetyan was head of the Yerevan branch of the NGO Research on Armenian Architecture (RAA). Karapetyan was also known as an outspoken critic of the treatment of Armenian monuments in Turkey: he argued that Turkey has a policy of intentional neglect and planned destruction. He also presented evidence that accuses Georgia and Azerbaijan of deliberately destroying Armenian historical monuments. He presented his findings to US Congress in 2007 and to the European Court of Human Rights in 2008.

Karapetyan was also an outspoken critic of the Armenian Apostolic Church and an advocate of the separation of church and state in Armenia.

In 2007 Karapetian received the Armenian Presidential Humanitarian Sciences Prize for his works, and in 2020 he was posthumously awarded by Movses Khorenatsi medal by the President of Armenia.

At the same time Karapetian's views received some criticism. In his 2003 book Black Garden British journalist Thomas de Waal disagreed with Karapetian's claims about the town of Kalbajar in Azerbaijan: "In what sense can Kelbajar be called 'Armenian', when no Armenian had lived there for almost a hundred years? I said that I could not accept that Kelbajar was 'liberated' territory, when all of its fifty thousand or so Azerbaijani or Kurdish inhabitants had been expelled". According to de Waal, for Karapetian "the past eclipsed the present: those were 'Turks' and interlopers".

== Published works ==
- (in Armenian) Բուն Աղվանքի հայերեն վիմագրերը (Armenian Lapidary Inscriptions in Caucasian Albania Proper). Yerevan: Gitutiun Publishing, 1997.
- (in Armenian) Վրաց Պետական Քաղաքականությունը և հայ մշակույթի հուշարձանները, 1988–1998 (Georgian State Policy and Historical Armenian Monuments, 1988–1998). Yerevan: Gitutiun Publishing, 1998.
- Armenian Cultural Monuments in the Region of Karabakh. Trans. Anahit Martirossian. Yerevan: Gitutiun Publishing, 2001.
- (in Armenian) Ջավախքի Պատմական Հուշարձանները (The Historical Monuments of Javakheti). Yerevan: Gitutiun Publishing, 2001.
- (in Armenian)Կովկասյան թանգարանի Հայկական հավաքածուն (The Armenian Collection of the Caucasian Museum). Yerevan: Gitutiun Publishing, 2004.
- (in Armenian) Հյուսիսային Արցախ (Northern Artsakh). Yerevan: Gitutiun Publishing, 2004.
- (in Armenian) Հայերը Կախեթում (The Armenians of Kakheti). Yerevan: Gitutiun Publishing, 2004.
