= Xok =

- Municipality
- Location within Azerbaijan
- Coordinates: 39°22′25″N 45°10′18″E
- Country: Azerbaijan
- Autonomous republic: Nakhchivan
- District: Kangarli

Population (2009)
  - Total: 5,234
- Time zone: UTC+4 (AZT)

Xok (also, Khok) is a village and municipality in the Kangarli District of Nakhchivan, Azerbaijan. It is located in the near of the Nakhchivan-Sharur highway, 6 km in the north-east from the district center, on the Sharur plain. Its population is busy with grain-growing, fodder and animal husbandry. There are secondary school, club, library and a medical center in the village. It has a population of 5234 (2009) .

== Etymology ==
It is one of the earliest settlements of the Azerbaijani people. According to some researchers, the oykonim is related with the Turkic word of xok (khok) // xak (khak) which is used in meaning of the "meadow, pasture". Also could be assumed that the name originated from the Iranian word of the xak (land).
