= Norashen, Nakhchivan =

Norashen
- Location within Azerbaijan
- Coordinates: 39°09′46″N 45°40′16″E
- Country: Azerbaijan
- Autonomous republic: Nakhchivan
- Time zone: UTC+4 (AZT)
  - Summer (DST): UTC+5 (AZT)

Norashen (Armenian: Նորաշեն, romanized: Norašen) is a village in the Nakhchivan Autonomous Republic of Azerbaijan.
