= Kangarli District =

District of Nakhchivan Autonomous Republic in Azerbaijan

Coordinates: 39°23′N 45°06′E

- District
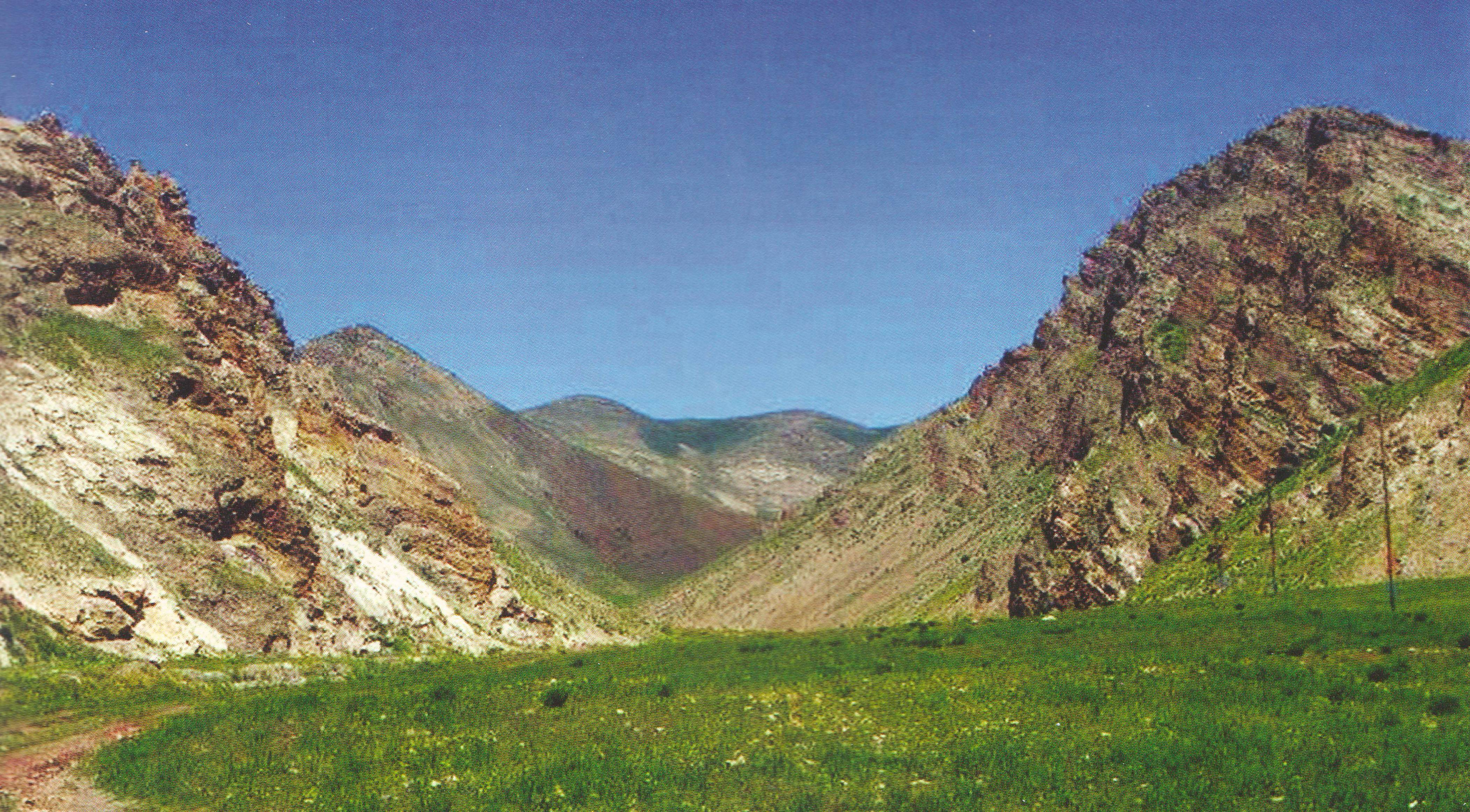

- Map of Azerbaijan showing Kangarli District
- Country: Azerbaijan
- Autonomous Republic: Nakhchivan
- Established: 19 March 2004
- Capital: Givrag
- Settlements: 11

Area
  - Total: 700 km^{2} (270 sq mi)

Population (2020)
  - Total: 32,700
  - Density: 47/km^{2} (120/sq mi)
- Time zone: UTC+4 (AZT)
- Postal code: 6827
- Website: kengerli-ih.nakhchivan.az

Kangarli District (Azerbaijani: Kəngərli rayonu) is one of the 7 districts of the Nakhchivan Autonomous Republic of Azerbaijan. The district borders the districts of Babek, Sharur, Nakhchivan city, as well as the Vayots Dzor Province of Armenia and the West Azerbaijan Province of Iran. Its capital is Givrag, while its largest settlement is Khok. As of 2020, the district had a population of 32,700.

== Etymology ==
Kangarli was the name of a Turkic tribe who founded a regional Maku Khanate that ruled the area. The district is named after the Kangarli tribe.

== Overview ==
Kangarli district was established on March 19, 2004, making it the newest district of Azerbaijan. The village of Givrag is the administrative centre of the district. It was founded in 2004. Givrag is located on the Nakhchivan-Sharur highway, 30 km from the capital (Nakhchivan) and 6 km from the Araz River. The climate, like in the rest of the autonomous republic, is strongly continental; it is very hot in summer and chilling in winter. On the territory of the district runs the Araz River that flows along the border between Azerbaijan and Iran.

The mountainous landscape, climatic conditions and lack of small rivers underlay the features of the indigenous fauna, which is represented largely by semidesert and mountainous species (bushes, herbage and scarce trees). Agriculture is developed in the district with advanced tobacco, cine, grain, vegetable and melon growing.

== Historical monuments ==
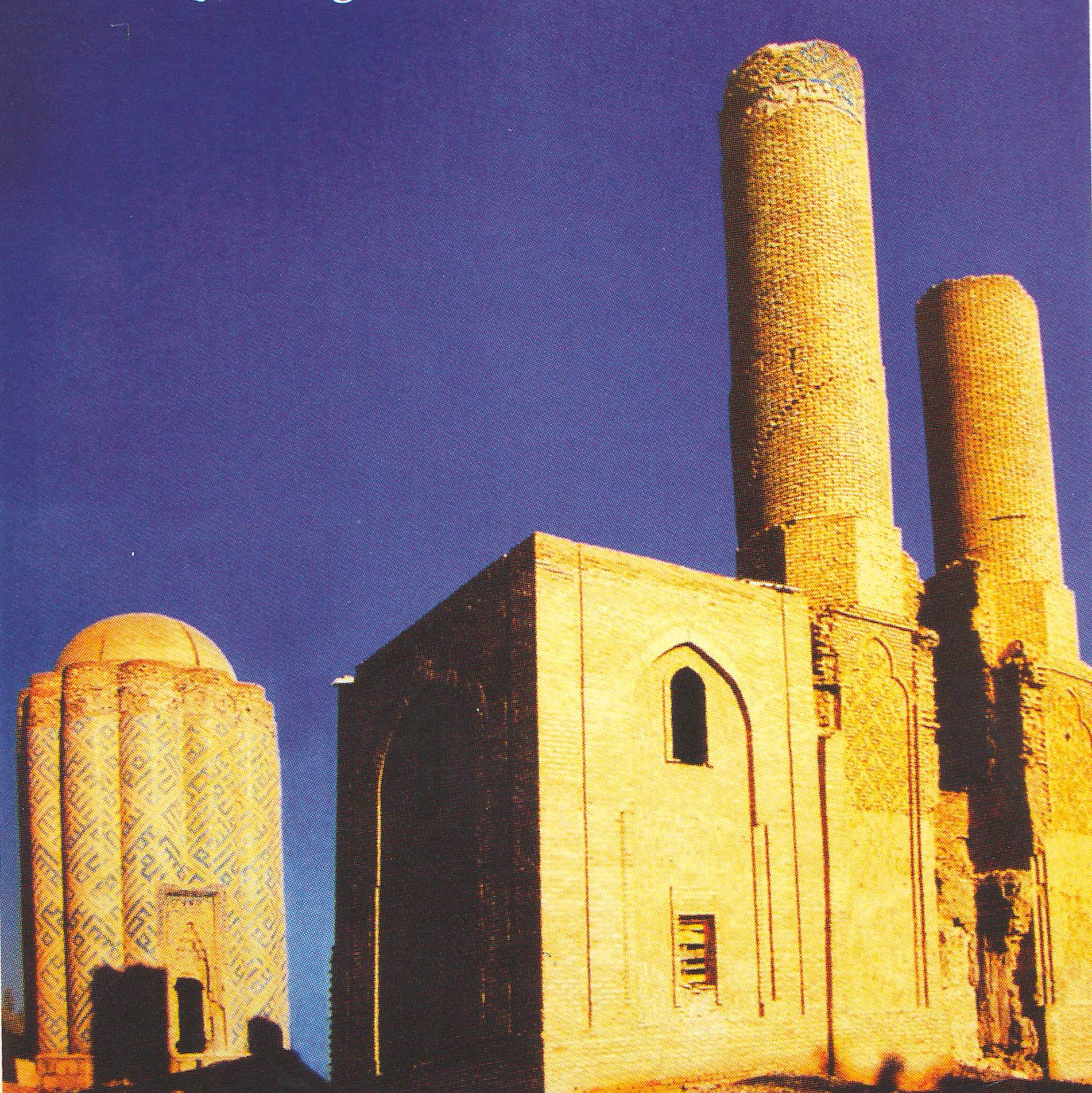
Kangarli district Karabakh complex

Like the rest of Nakhchivan Autonomous Republic, there are many ancient monuments, evidencing that the land was inhabited in the earliest times: the Chilkhangala mounds, the Gazma Cave and the ancient settlements of Galadzhig, Govurgala, Damlama, Gulamtepe and Balatepe. There are also newer monuments - the Jami Mosque (18th century) in the village of Khok, a mosque of the 18th century and a bath of the 19th century in the village of Shakhtakhty.

== Population ==
According to the State Statistics Committee, as of 2018, the population of city recorded 32,200 persons, which increased by 6,900 persons (about 27 percent) from 25,300 persons in 2004. Of the total population, 15,900 are men and 16,300 are women. More than 10,9 percent of the population (about 8,200 persons) consists of young people and teenagers aged 14–29.

The population of city (at the beginning of the year, thsd. persons)
| Region | 2004 | 2005 | 2006 | 2007 | 2008 | 2009 | 2010 | 2011 | 2012 | 2013 | 2014 | 2015 | 2016 | 2017 | 2018 |
|---|---|---|---|---|---|---|---|---|---|---|---|---|---|---|---|
| Kengerli region | 25,3 | 25,6 | 26,1 | 26,4 | 26,9 | 27,5 | 27,9 | 28,6 | 29,2 | 29,9 | 30,6 | 31,0 | 31,4 | 31,8 | 32,2 |
| urban population | 4,2 | 4,2 | 4,3 | 4,4 | 4,5 | 4,6 | 5,1 | 5,3 | 5,4 | 5,5 | 5,7 | 5,8 | 5,9 | 6,0 | 6,1 |
| rural population | 21,1 | 21,4 | 21,8 | 22,0 | 22,4 | 22,9 | 22,8 | 23,3 | 23,8 | 24,4 | 24,9 | 25,2 | 25,5 | 25,8 | 26,1 |
