= St. Stepanos Church (disambiguation) =

St. Stepanos Church was an Armenian church in Smyrna, Turkey.

St. Stepanos Church may also refer to several ruins in the Nakhchivan Autonomous Republic of Azerbaijan:

- St. Stepanos Church (Alahi)
- St. Stepanos Church (Ashaghy Aylis)
- St. Stepanos Church (Kələki)
- St. Stepanos Church (Ordubad)
- St. Stepanos Church (Yukhari Aylis)
- Saint Stepanos Church (Shinuhayr)

== See also ==
- Sourp Stepanos Church, Larnaca, an Armenian Apostolic church in Cyprus
- Lower Bethlehemi Church, also known as the Church of Saint Stepanos of the Holy Virgins, in Old Tbilisi, Georgia
