= Alagi =

Alagi may refer to:

- Ələhi, a municipality in Azerbaijan
- Amba Alagi, a mountain in Ethiopia
- Italian submarine Alagi, named after the mountain
- An alternative name of Allagi, Greece
