= Holy Mother of God Church of Bethlehem, Tbilisi =

Church building in Tbilisi, Georgia

Holy Mother of God Church of Bethlehem
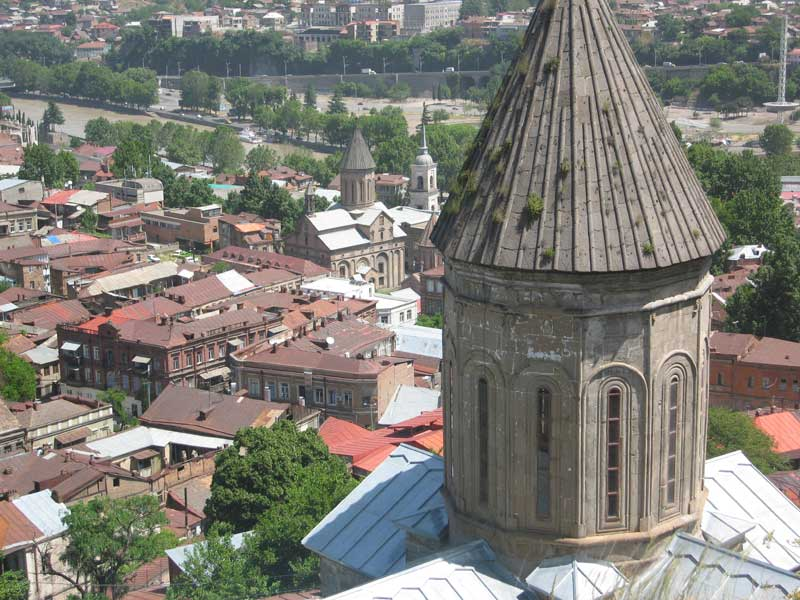
- Saint Bethlehem Church (foreground) as seen from the Narikala fortress

Religion
- Affiliation: Georgian Orthodox Church

Location
- Location: Old Tbilisi, Georgia
- Interactive map of Holy Mother of God Church of Bethlehem
- Coordinates: 41.688871°N 44.804599°E

Architecture
- Style: Armenian
- Groundbreaking: Second half of the 13th century
- Completed: 1727

Holy Mother of God Church of Bethlehem (Georgian: ზემო ბეთლემის მაცხოვრის შობის ტაძარი, zemo betlemis matskhovris shobis tadzari; Armenian: Բեթղեհեմի Սուրբ Աստվածածին եկեղեցի or Betlehemi Surb Astvatsatsin yekeghetsi; also now known as the Upper Bethlehem Church) is a church in Tbilisi, Georgia. Built as an Armenian church in the 18th century, on the site of an older church, it now operates as a Georgian orthodox church.

== History ==
Upper Betlemi church is located at the foot of Narikala fortress in Kldis-Ubani (Roch District) district of Tbilisi. Firstly the chapel was founded, but the manager of construction priest Gregory died and was buried near the chapel. The work was completed by his grandson Barsegh. For long time services was held in that chapel. and the church remained unfinished. The upper parts, constructed of black stone, were built by Agha-Meliq Bebutyan, a participant of the Indian crusade of Nadir Shah and who was killed in battle against the Turks in 1724. He invited two nuns from the St. Yekaterina Monastery in New Julfa. His son Meliq Avetis built the fence. According to priests of the church Melikset and Mesrop Ter-Grigoryan the new church was founded by priest Sargis in cooperation with Khoja-Parukh, Baghdasar, Harutyun and Stepan. The foundation of the chapel was in the end of the 13th century. Construction of bigger church was held during reign of catholicos Eghiazar (1681–1691) and Alexander (1706–1714). During the second half of the 18th century the Archpriest of the church was Mkhitar, who was murdered by Agha Mohammed Khan for refusing to show the hiding-place where the church treasures were kept. After Mikhtar his son Stepanos becomes the Prior, "a priest gifted", who is much described in scripts. In 1981, during excavations inside the church, the basement of the chapel was found. The church is headed by Father Ioane Rostiashvili.

== Georgian appropriation ==
In 1994 the church was placed under the control of the Georgian Orthodox Church. In 1990, the original Armenian cross of the church was removed. In 1990–1991, the Armenian fresco in the interior of the dome depicting the Holy Father was erased. Also, the Armenian altar piece, originally constructed in 1898, along with the Armenian inscription attesting to its construction was completely destroyed by early 1990. The basin for baptism was also completely destroyed. The late-17th-century inscribed Armenian khachkar was removed from the entrance and later disappeared.

== Gallery ==
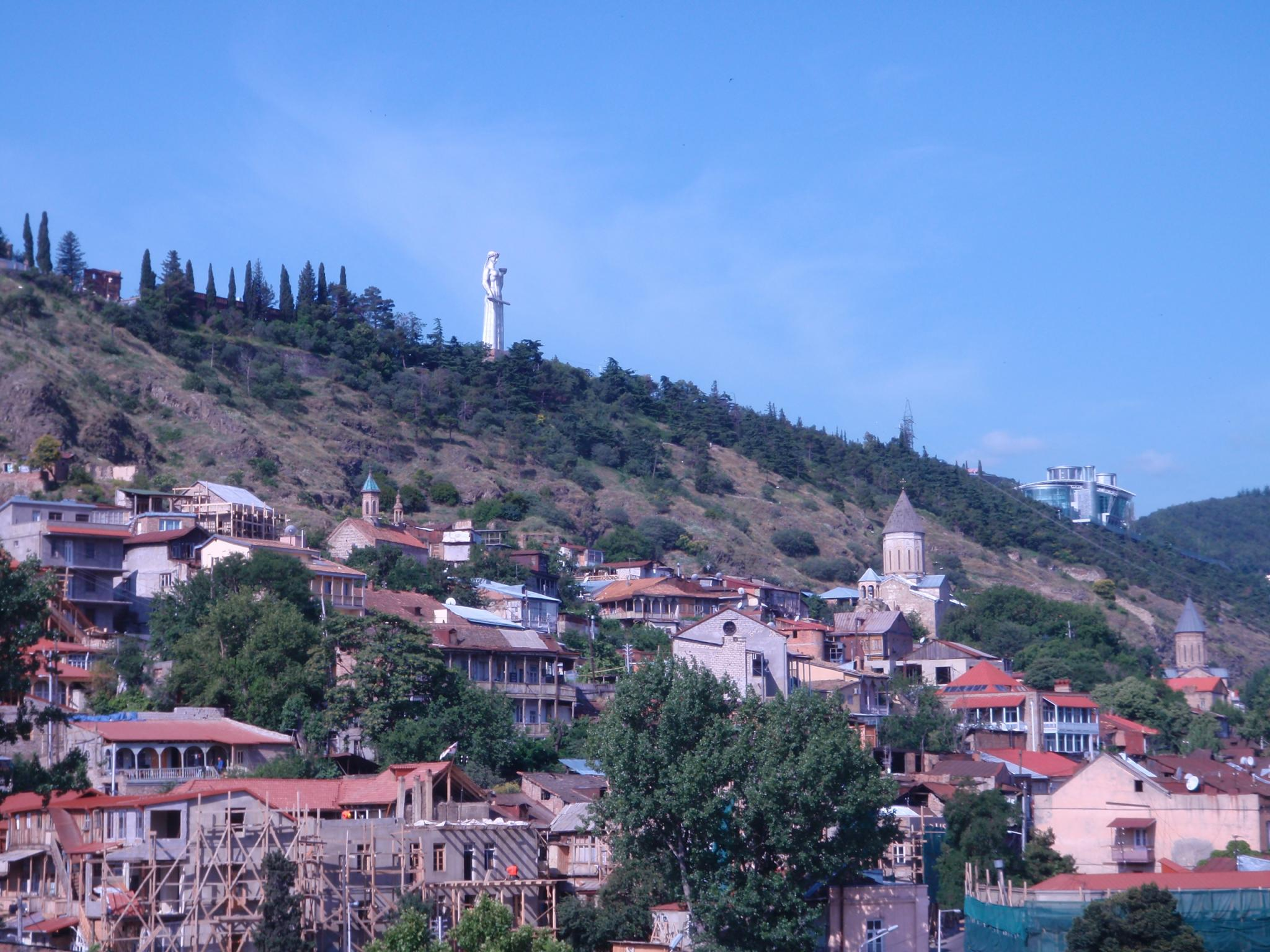
View of Holy Mother of God Church (middle) and two other Armenian churches in Old Tbilisi: Saint Stepanos (far right) and Saint George (center left)

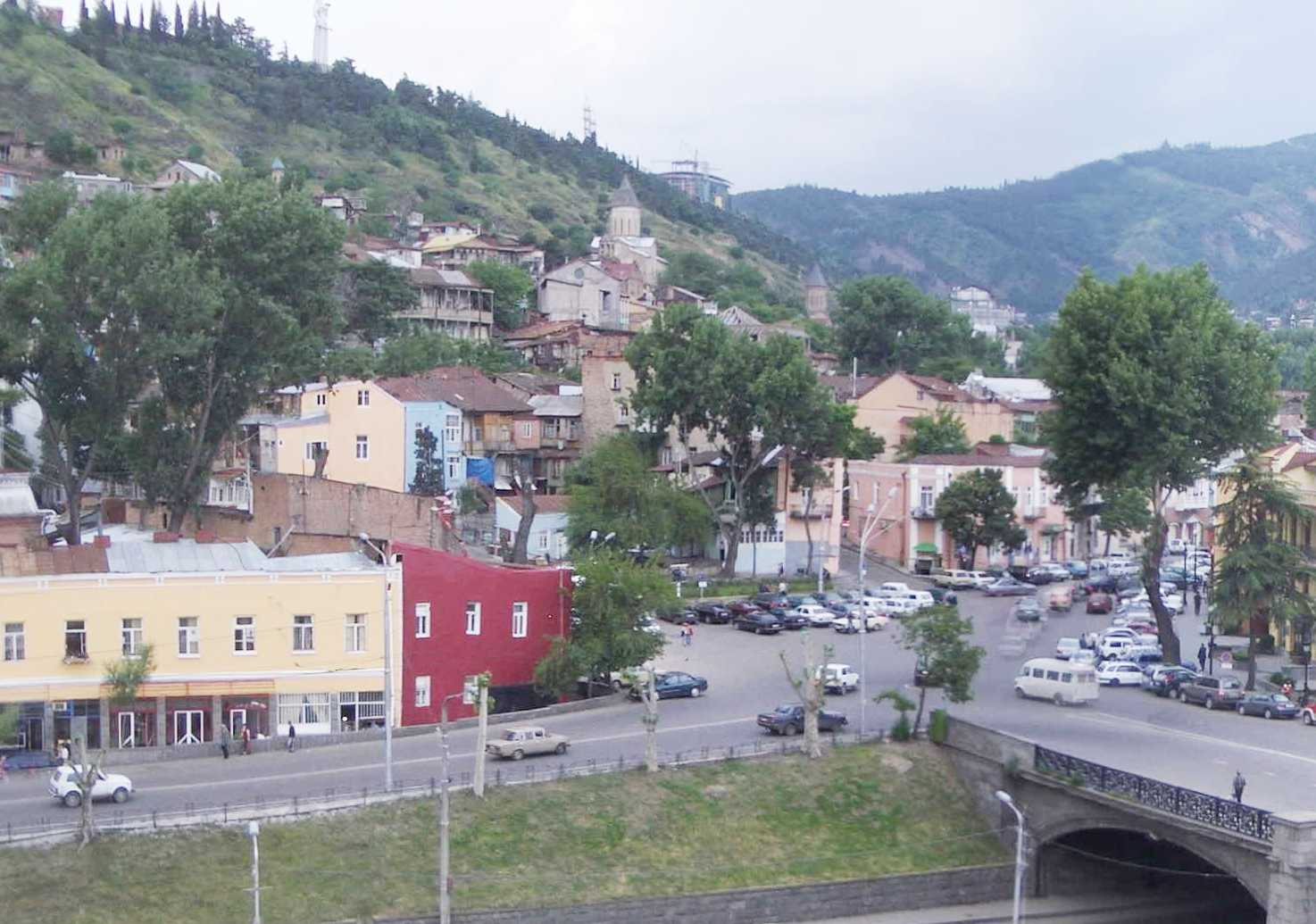
Another view of the Armenian Quarter with Saint Bethlehem Church (above center)

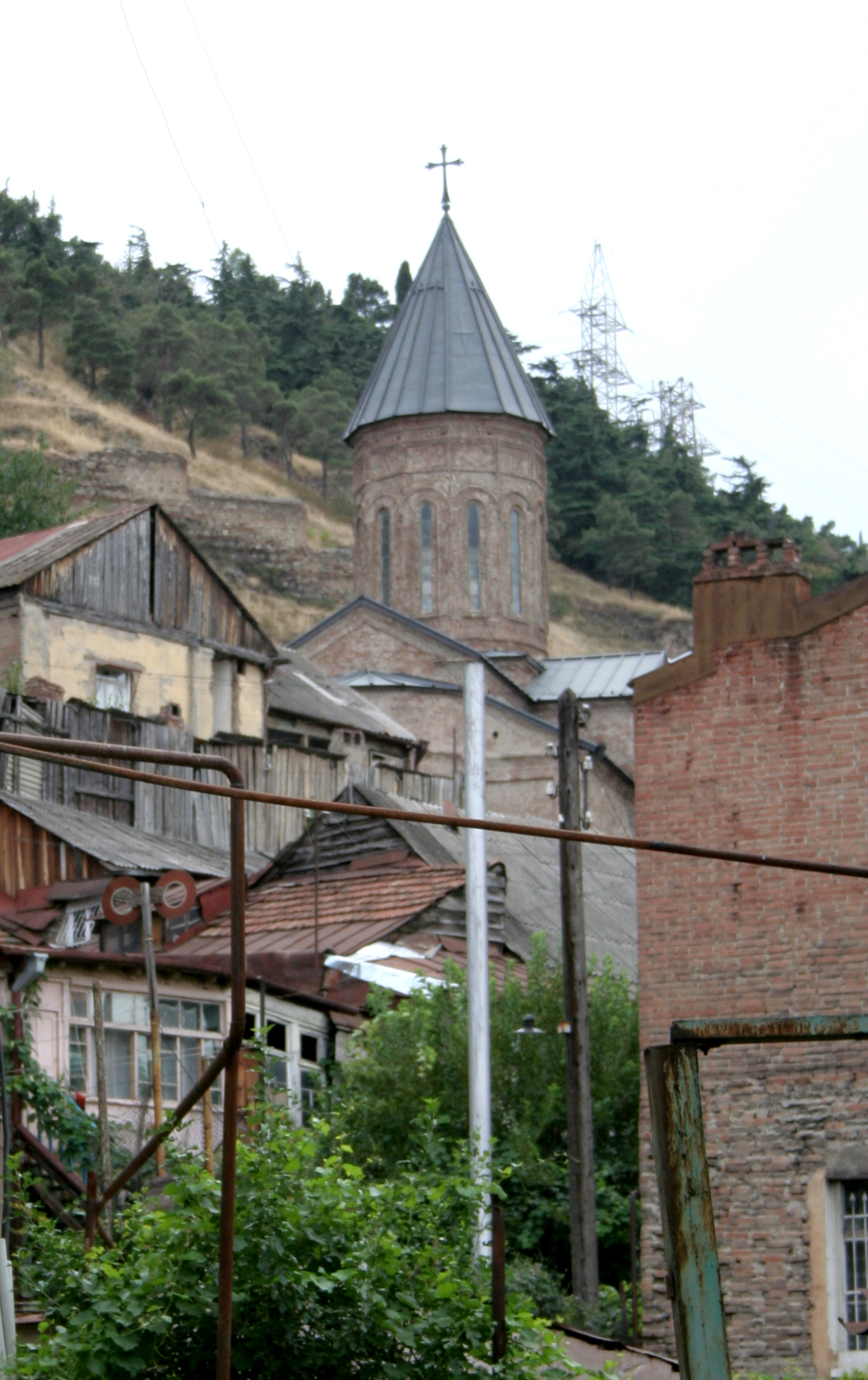

== See also ==
- Church of Saint Stepanos of the Holy Virgins ("Lower Bethlehem Church")
- Saint Gevorg of Mughni
- Armenians in Georgia
- Atashgah of Tbilisi
