= Lower Bethlehemi Church =

Church in Old Tbilisi, Georgia

Church of Saint Stepanos of the Holy Virgins Կուսանաց Սուրբ Ստեփանոս վանք ქვემო ბეთლემის ეკლესია
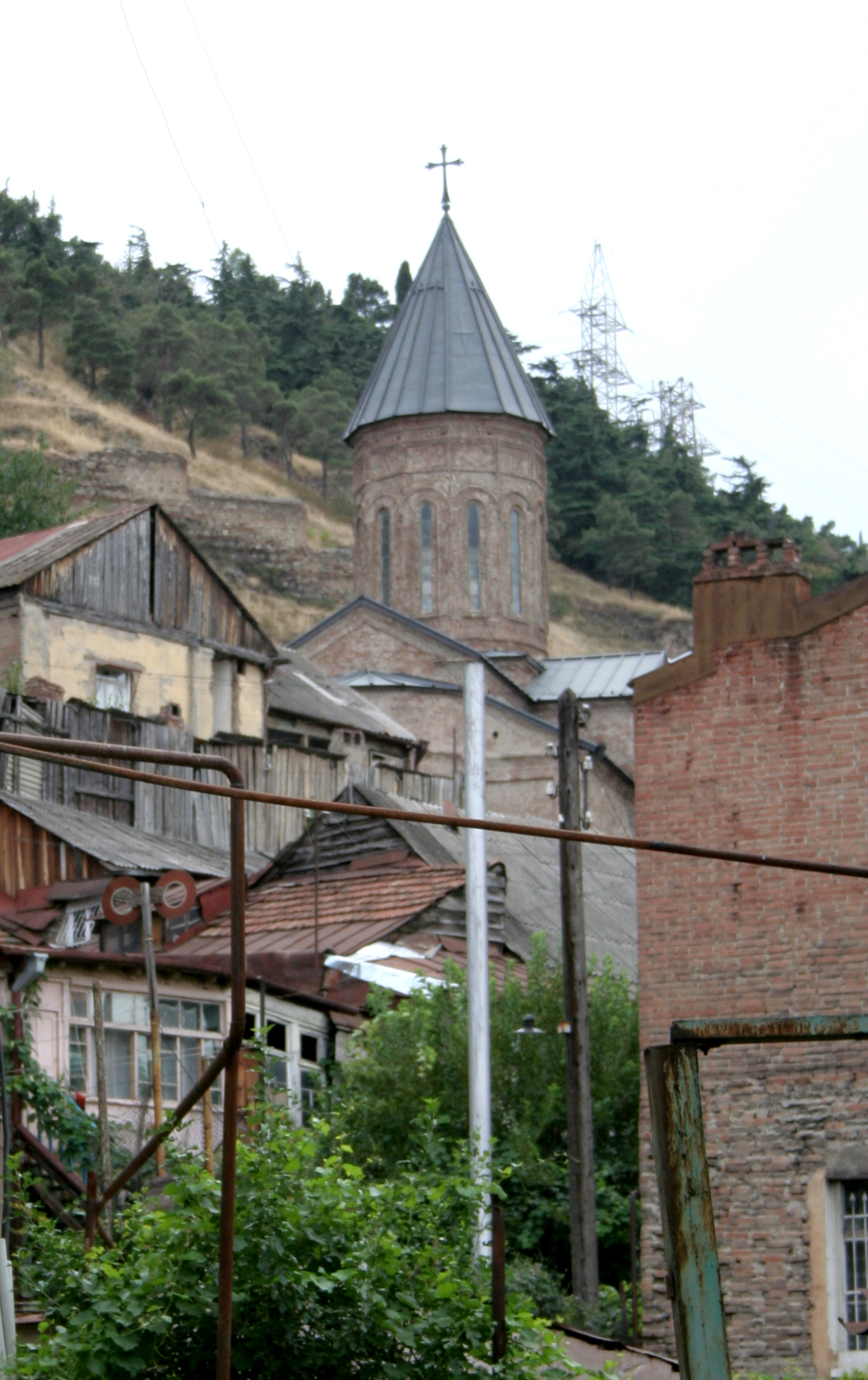

Religion
- Affiliation: Georgian Orthodox Church

Location
- Location: Old Tbilisi, Georgia
- Interactive map of Church of Saint Stepanos of the Holy Virgins; Կուսանաց Սուրբ Ստեփանոս վանք ქვემო ბეთლემის ეკლესია
- Coordinates: 41.689230°N 44.8040148°E

Architecture
- Style: Armenian
- Completed: 1868–1870

The Lower Bethlemi Church(Georgian: ქვემო ბეთლემის ეკლესია), also known as the Church of Saint Stepanos of the Holy Virgins (Armenian: Կուսանաց Սուրբ Ստեփանոս վանք) or Koosanats Sourb Stepanos Vank) – is a 14th–19th-century church at the foot of Narikala fortress in Old Tbilisi, Georgia. It was rebuilt between 1868 and 1870 and operated as an Armenian church. In 1988 it was given to the Georgian Orthodox and its Armenian identity was "Georgianized" in 1991.

== Georgian appropriation ==
From 1989 to 1995, the church underwent a heavy process of "Georganization", during which time all evidence of Armenian religious iconography was destroyed or removed and was replaced with Georgian ones.

The alterations to remove the church's original Armenian characteristics included:

- the destruction of the ground floor portal and mausoleum of Mother-Superior Peprone in 1990
- the removal of the iron gratings of the windows and the covering of windows with bricks in 1995
- the removal of Armenian high-reliefs stretching all around the drum of the church from 1991–1993
- the destruction on the top of the western pediment of the church (blown up on February 9, 1990)
- the destruction of the marble Armenian "khachkal" in the middle of the apse in 1990
- the removal of a marble cross, altar stone, and other fragments for safe-keeping at the Cathedral of Saint Gevorg in 1990
- the razing of the high altar and khachkal (1990–1991)
- the destruction of the baptistery font which had been in the northern wall
- the removal of the marble washing-basin (1870) and taken to safe-keeping at Saint Gevorg
- the destruction of the Armenian inscription on the interior of the drum that recounts the repairs of the cupola roof
- the removal of the Armenian inscription from 1870 that recounting the erection of the column with deaconess Hripsime Begtabeguiantz's means (removed in 1991)
- the removal of a marble inscription slab (1870) recounting deaconess Katarine Yerkainabazouk-Arghoutiantz's construction activity removed in 1990)
- the removal of the marble inscription slab which recounts the construction of activity of the Ourdoubekiantz couple (disappeared in 1990)
- the removal of the marble inscription slab recounting the construction of the upper floor of the church
- the removal of the inscription specifying that the metal spiral stairs leading to the upper floor were built in 1885 on the initiative and means of arch-deaconess Evpimia Behboutiantz
- the throwing away of other Armenian lapidary inscriptions during the abolition of the Armenian characteristics of the church between 1990–1991
- the removal and destruction of the memorial inscription carved on a marble slab on the wall of Mother-Superior Heprosime Abamelikian's burial vault under the portal in front of the northern entrance of the church (the mausoleum was also destroyed) in 1990
- A painting in the style of a Georgian fresco was placed on the tympanum of the altered northern entrance in June 1995

== Gallery ==
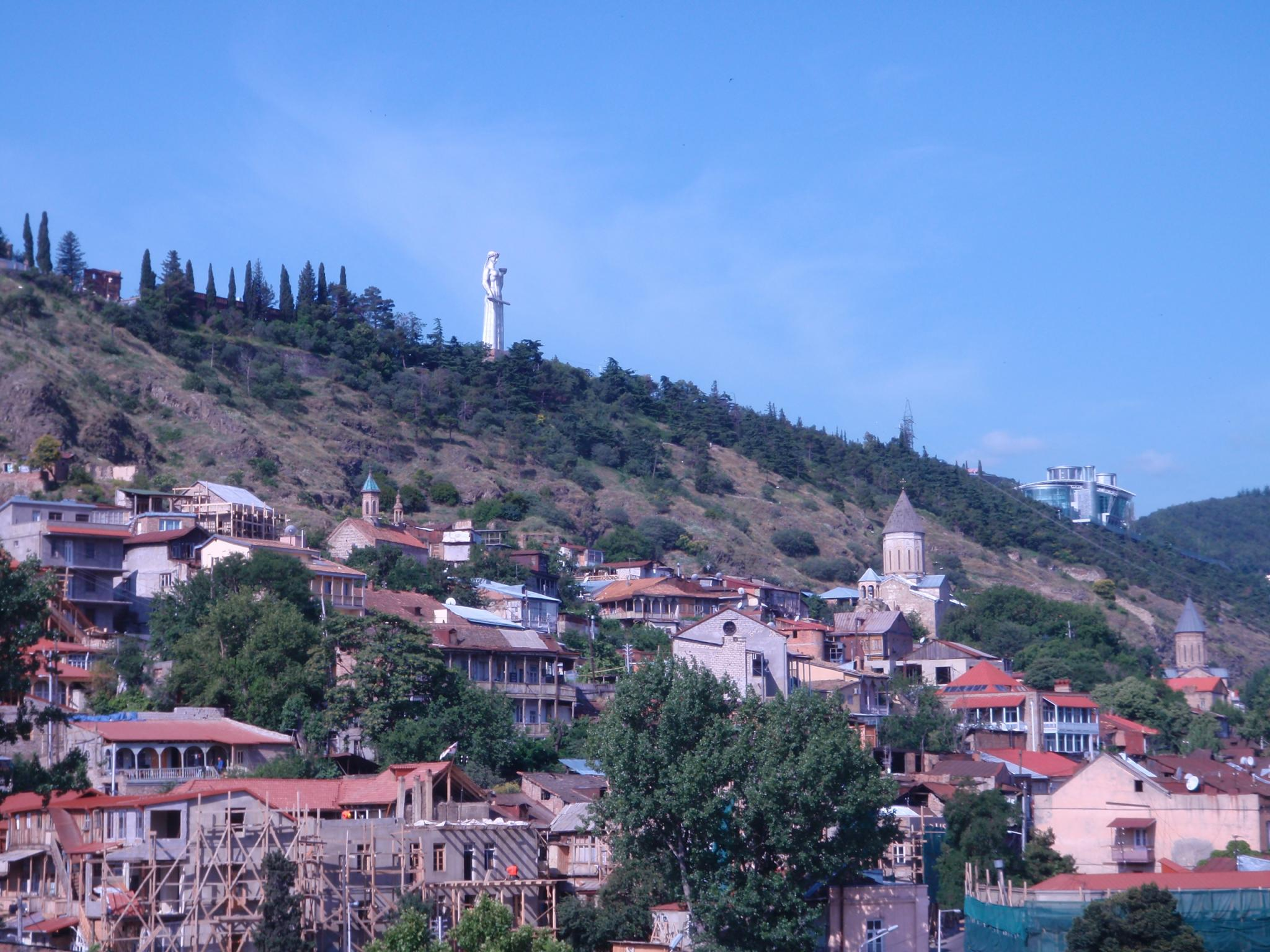
View of Saint Stepano (far right) and two other Armenian churches in Old Tbilisi: Holy Mother of God (Bethlehem) (middle) and Saint George (far left)

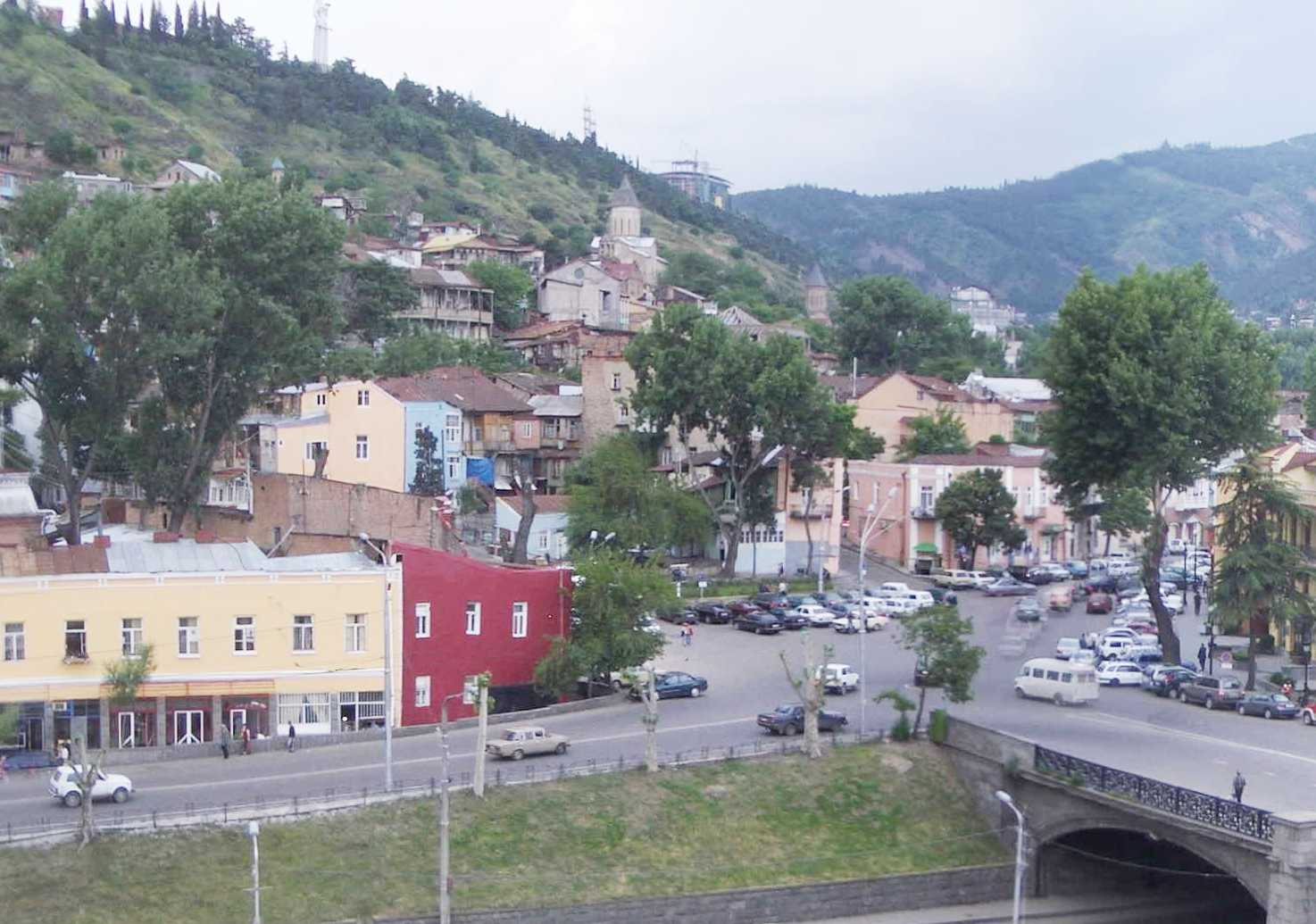
Another view of the Armenian Quarter with Saint Stepanos Church (right of center)

== See also ==
- Saint Bethlehem Armenian Church, a nearby 18th century Armenian church
- Saint Gevorg of Mughni Church, a nearby 13th century Armenian church
- Cathedral of Saint George, a nearby 13th century Armenian church
- Holy Mother of God (Norashen) Church, a nearby 15th century Armenian church
- Armenians in Georgia
