= Atashgah of Tbilisi =

Zoroastrian fire temple in Tbilisi, Georgia

- ათეშგა
- The Atashgah of Tbilisi

- Location in Tbilisi

Religion
- Affiliation: Zoroastrianism
- District: Old Tbilisi
- Ecclesiastical or organisational status: Cultural heritage monument
- Year consecrated: Sasanian period (c. 3rd–7th centuries CE)

Location
- Location: Tbilisi, Georgia
- Coordinates: 41.68885°N 44.80559°E

Architecture
- Type: Fire temple
- Style: Sasanian architecture
- Materials: Brick

The Atashgah, also transcribed as Ateshgah (Georgian: ათეშგა, from Persian: آتشگاه, "fire temple"), is an ancient Zoroastrian fire temple located in Tbilisi, Georgia. The monument is generally dated to the Sasanian era (224–651 CE), when eastern Georgia was under Persian political and cultural influence. It has been described as the "northernmost Zoroastrian fire-temple in the world."

Atashgah is located around 100 meters east of the Holy Mother of God Church of Bethlehem, on the Old Town slopes northeast of the Mother Georgia statue. It is an ancient brick building with a protective curved perspex roof. The temple is one of the oldest religious buildings in the Georgia's capital located in the historic part of the city.

The Atashgah has been preserved because it has been discreetly camouflaged in the city. There is little information as to when it was built, but some historians refer to it as having been built in the Sassanian era. During the wars between Persians and Turkish Muslims, Tbilisi fell into Turkish hands and the church was temporarily turned into a mosque. The site is inscribed on Georgia's list of Monuments of National Significance. In 2007, the Norwegian government joined a project to restore Atashgah.

== See also ==
- Sasanian Iberia
