= Kələki =

Village and municipality in Ordubad, Nakhchivan, Azerbaijan

- Municipality
- Location within Azerbaijan
- Coordinates: 39°00′12″N 45°58′55″E
- Country: Azerbaijan
- Autonomous republic: Nakhchivan
- District: Ordubad

Population (2005)
  - Total: 463
- Time zone: UTC+4 (AZT)

Kələki (also, Kalaki, Kalakik and Kyalaki) is a village and municipality in the Ordubad District of Nakhchivan, Azerbaijan. It is located on the Ordubad-Unus highway, 45 km in the north-east from the district center. People of the village is busy with gardening, vegetable-growing, animal husbandry. There are secondary school, club, library and a medical center in the village. It has a population of 463.

== History ==
Kələki is a village of the Ordubad district in the administrative unit of the Unus village, on the bank of the Vənəndçay river, on the foothill of the Uçurdağ mountain. The village got its name from the nearby ruins of the castle. The name made out the words in Arabic-language "kala" (castle) and in Persian-language, the word "ki" (mountain) of the phonetic version of "kuh" so it roughly translates to "mountain castle".

The village had an Armenian church (St. Stepanos Church), which continued to exist until the early 2000s and it was destroyed at some point between 2000 and 2009.

== Notable natives ==
- Abulfaz Elchibey (24 June 1938 – 22 August 2000), ex-president of Azerbaijan Republic.

== See also ==
- St. Stepanos Church (Kələki)
