= St. Stepanos Church (Kələki) =

Armenian church in Kələki, Ordubad, Nakhchivan, Azerbaijan

- Church of Kaghakik
- Քաղաքիկի եկեղեցի
- St. Stepanos Church
- Location: Kələki
- Country: Azerbaijan
- Denomination: Armenian Apostolic Church

History
- Founded: 1441

Architecture
- Demolished: 2000–2009

St. Stepanos Church was an Armenian church located in the northeastern district of the Kələki village (Ordubad district) of the Nakhchivan Autonomous Republic of Azerbaijan. The church was still standing in the early 2000s.

== History ==
According to an Armenian inscription on a cross-stone (khachkar) above the lintel of the portal, the church was either founded or renovated in 1441 by Agha Shain. It was also renovated in the 17th and 19th centuries. The church is also mentioned in the 17th century Armenian inscription of St. Tovma Monastery of Agulis.

== Architectural characteristics ==
St. Stepanos had a single-chamber nave, eastern apse with two vestries on either side, an entrance in the western facade, and a porch in the west. Historian Argam Ayvazyan recorded traces of wall painting on the plastered walls of the interior, as well as Armenian inscriptions on the western facade.

== Destruction ==
The church was a well-preserved and still standing monument in the late Soviet period (1980s) and in the early 2000s. However, the church was erased between 2000 and August 13, 2009, as documented by satellite forensic investigation of the Caucasus Heritage Watch.

== See also ==
- Saint Thomas Monastery of Agulis
- Kələki
