= Church of Saint George (Kldisubani) =

18th-century church in Old Tbilisi, Georgia

Kldisubani St. George Church Qarapi Saint Gevorg church
- Քարափի Սուրբ Գևորգ եկեղեցի კლდისუბნის წმინდა გიორგის ეკლესია
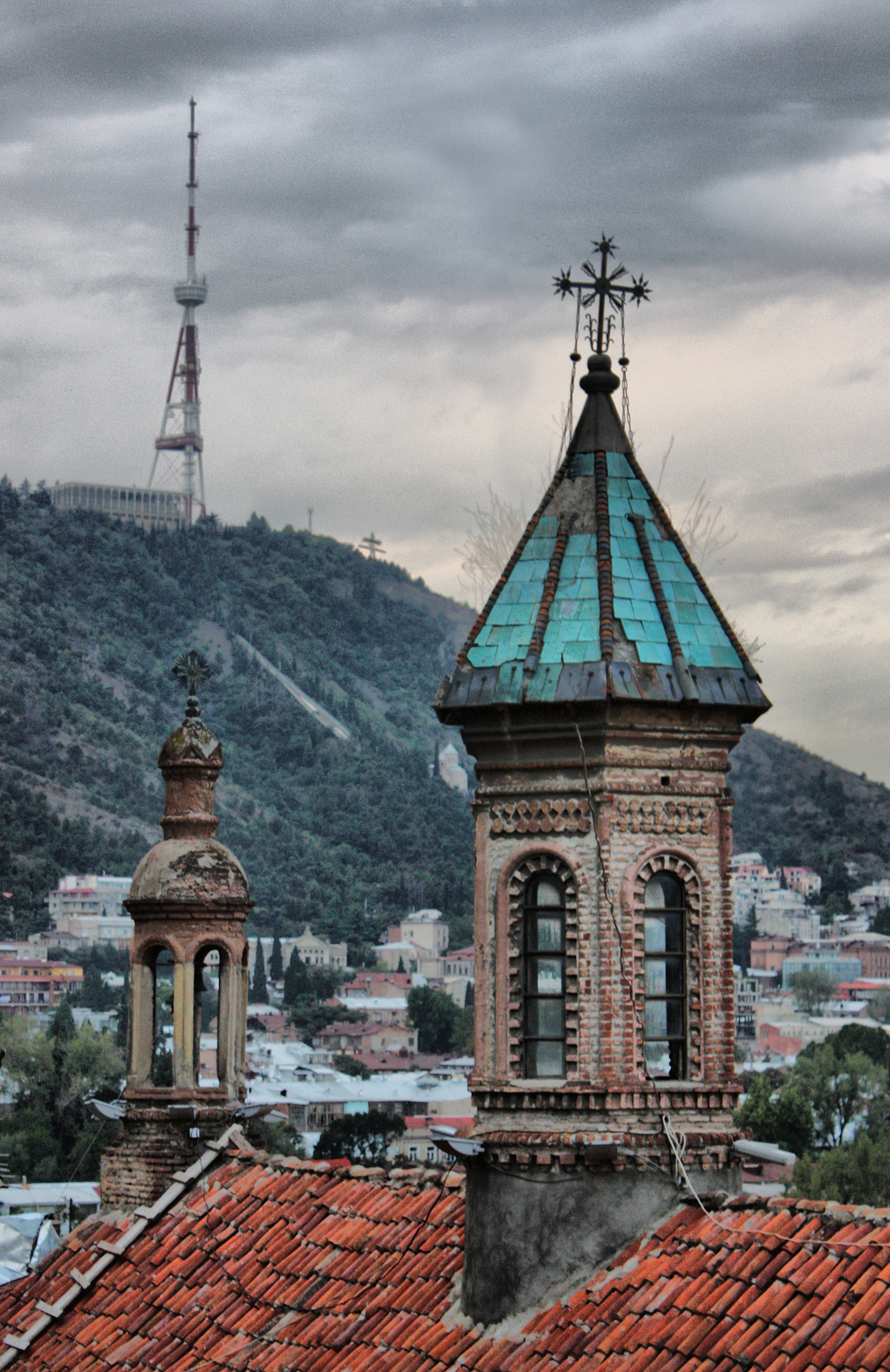
- The view of the church and Tbilisi Tower.

- Location within Georgia

Religion
- Affiliation: Georgian Orthodox Church; Armenian Apostolic Church
- District: Old Tbilisi District
- Region: Caucasus
- Leadership: Father Michael (Kapanadze)
- Status: Active

Location
- Location: Tbilisi, Old Tbilisi District, Georgia
- Coordinates: 41.688700°N 44.806642°E

Architecture
- Type: Georgian; Church
- Style: Single-nave church
- Completed: 1753

The Kldisubani St. George Church or Qarapi Saint Gevorg church (Georgian: კლდისუბნის წმ. გიორგის ეკლესია, Kldisubnis Tsminda Giorgis Eklesia; Armenian: Քարափի Սուրբ Գևորգ եկեղեցի, or Karapi Surb Gevorg Yekeghetsi) is an 18th-century church at the foot of the Narikala citadel in Old Tbilisi, Georgia. The church is single-naved and was built in 1753. The Georgian Orthodox Church was built on the site of an ancient Georgian church which was built during the reign of St. King Vakhtang I of Iberia. The church was reconstructed with the help of Armenian merchant Petros Zohrabian and his wife Lolita and the restoration held by them in 1735, what makes the church one of the most important examples of Georgian-Armenian friendship and cooperation.

== History ==
According to the Georgian Orthodox Church the ancient church that stood at the site of the current Church of Saint Georgie in Kldisubani was built by King Vakhtang I of Iberia and then was part of the "mother-castle ensemble". The ensemble "mother-castle" consisted of the Church of Forty Martyrs, monastery of Saint Catherine, Big Church of Saint George, Church of Saint George in Kldisubani, church called "Jris Mama" (Georgian: Father Cross) and lower Bethlemi monastery. The Kldisubani church of st. George has reached modern days with the help of Armenian merchant Petros Zohrabian and his wife Lolita, and the restoration held by them in 1735. In the year 1735 according to the map of prince Vakhushti there was a belltower at the west of the church.

In the beginning of the 20th century, there were built some residential buildings on the territory of the Church. During the Soviet era the church was abandoned and used as toy and glue workshop.

=== Georgian appropriation in early 1990s ===
According to Samvel Karapetyan, a prominent Armenian researcher of Armenian architecture, the church was systematically appropriated by the Georgian Orthodox Church shortly after the fall of the Soviet Union in the early 1990s. The appropriation meant the removal of all traces of the Armenian history of the church: The metal Armenian ornamental crosses remained intact on the church's two cupolas until 1990; In April 1990, the crosses that were seen as "Armenian" were removed; In March–April 1990, the church's main altar and another smaller altar used for baptism were destroyed; A khachkar with an inscription that was part of an interior wall was removed sometime between 1990 and 1991; Also, the Armenian inscription on the wall of the northern entrance that attests to the 1753 construction of the church disappeared in 1990.

After the destruction of Armenian architectural elements in the building, the Georgian Orthodox Church renovated the church and sanctified it as a Georgian Orthodox Church on 23 November 1991. Since 2002 restorations are held. The church was strengthened, cleared, was renewed the garden.

== Gallery ==
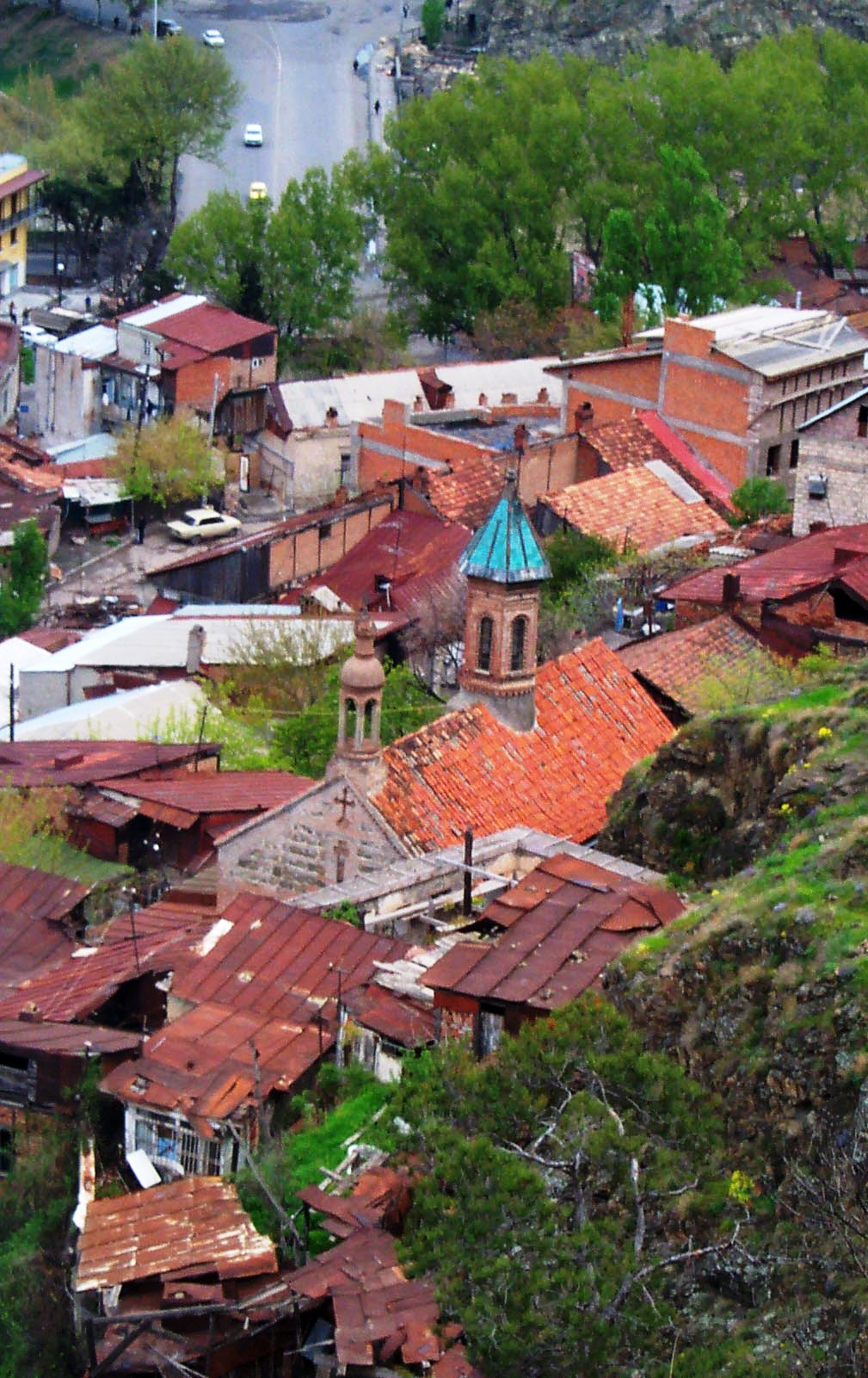
View of Saint George's Church from the citadel of Narikala

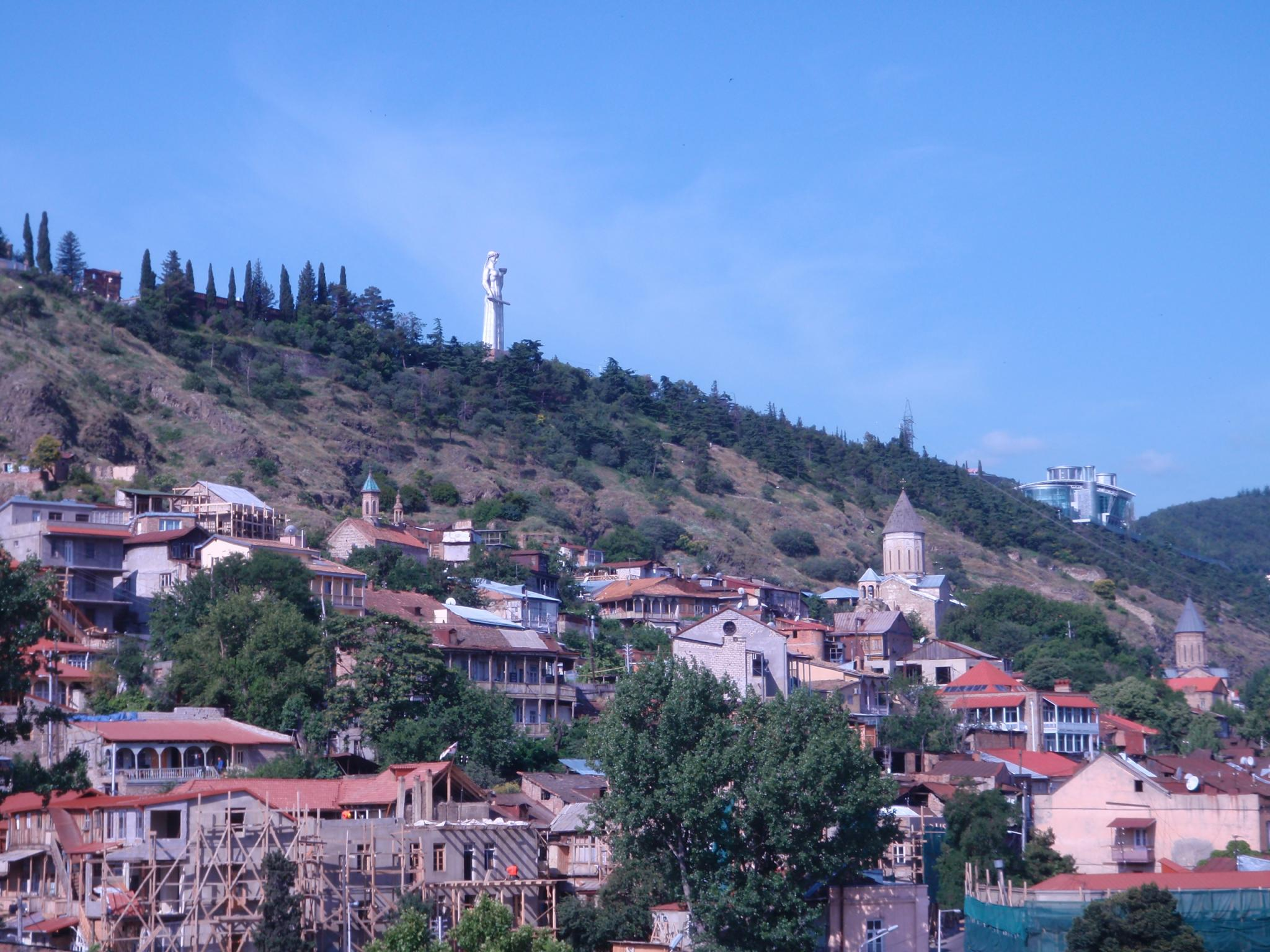
View of Saint George (center left) and two other churches in Old Tbilisi: Holy Mother of God (Bethlehem) (center right) and Lower Betlemi church. (far right)

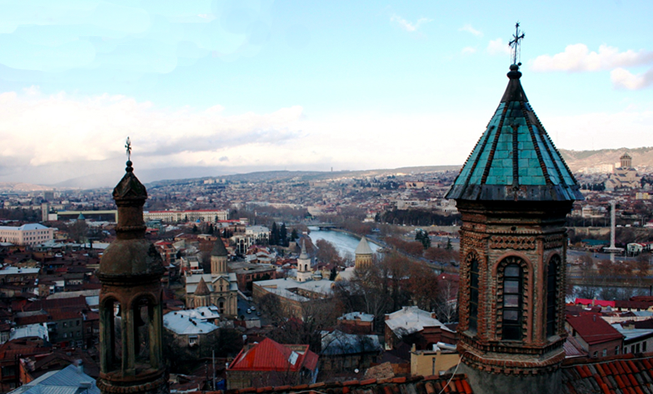
View of Old Tbilisi with the cupolas of the Church of Saint George in the foreground

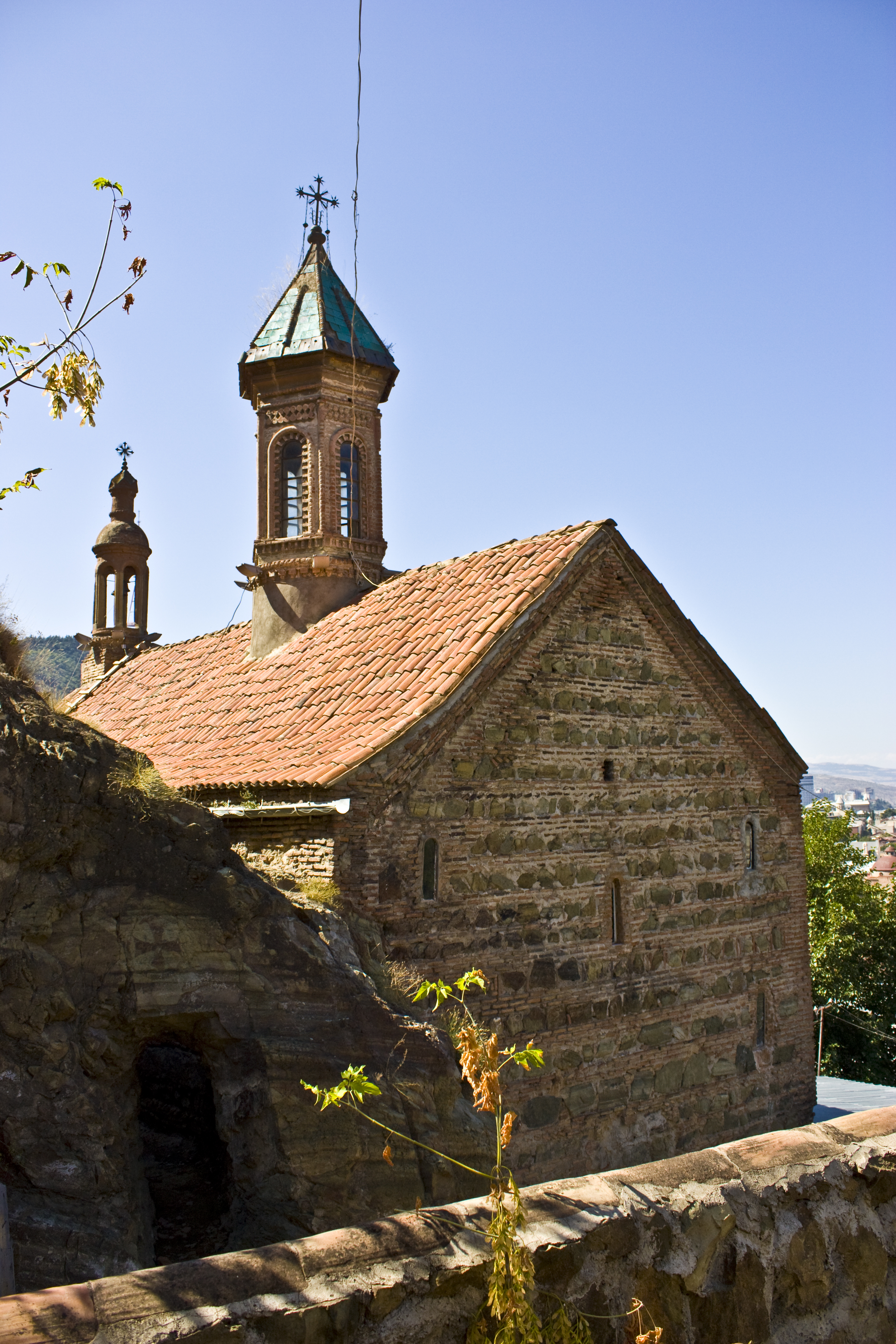
The view of the church from the inner garden. Over the pass, cut in the rock, Bolnisi Cross can be seen..

== See also ==
- Cathedral of Saint George, a nearby 13th century Armenian cathedral
- Armenian architecture
- Armenians in Georgia
