= St. Stepanos Church (Ordubad) =

Armenian church in Nakhchivan, Azerbaijan

- Սուրբ Ստեփանոս եկեղեցի
- St. Stepanos Church
- Location: Ordubad
- Country: Azerbaijan
- Denomination: Armenian Apostolic Church

History
- Founded: 12th century

Architecture
- Demolished: February 2000 – November 2011

St. Stepanos Church was an Armenian church located on a hill in the northern part of Ordubad city (Ordubad district) of the Nakhchivan Autonomous Republic of Azerbaijan. The church was still partially standing monument in the early 2000s and was destroyed at some point between 2000 and 2011.

== History ==
The church was founded in the 12th century and was renovated in the 17th century as well as in 1836.

== Architectural characteristics ==
The church was severely damaged in the late Soviet period; its roof, cupola, and upper parts of the walls missing. The church had an apse, two vestries, a hall, an entrance on the northern facade, and a porch along the south facade. Stone stairways led from the apse to upper chambers above the ceiling of the vestries and above the apse.

== Destruction ==
The church was still a standing monument in the early 2000s and was destroyed between 2000 and 2011, in particular it has been already completely erased between February 2000 and November 9, 2011, as it is documented by the satellite forensic investigation of the Caucasus Heritage Watch.
