= Saint Stepanos Church (Shinuhayr) =

Coordinates: 39.4269°N 46.3205°E

Saint Stepanos church (Shinuhayr)
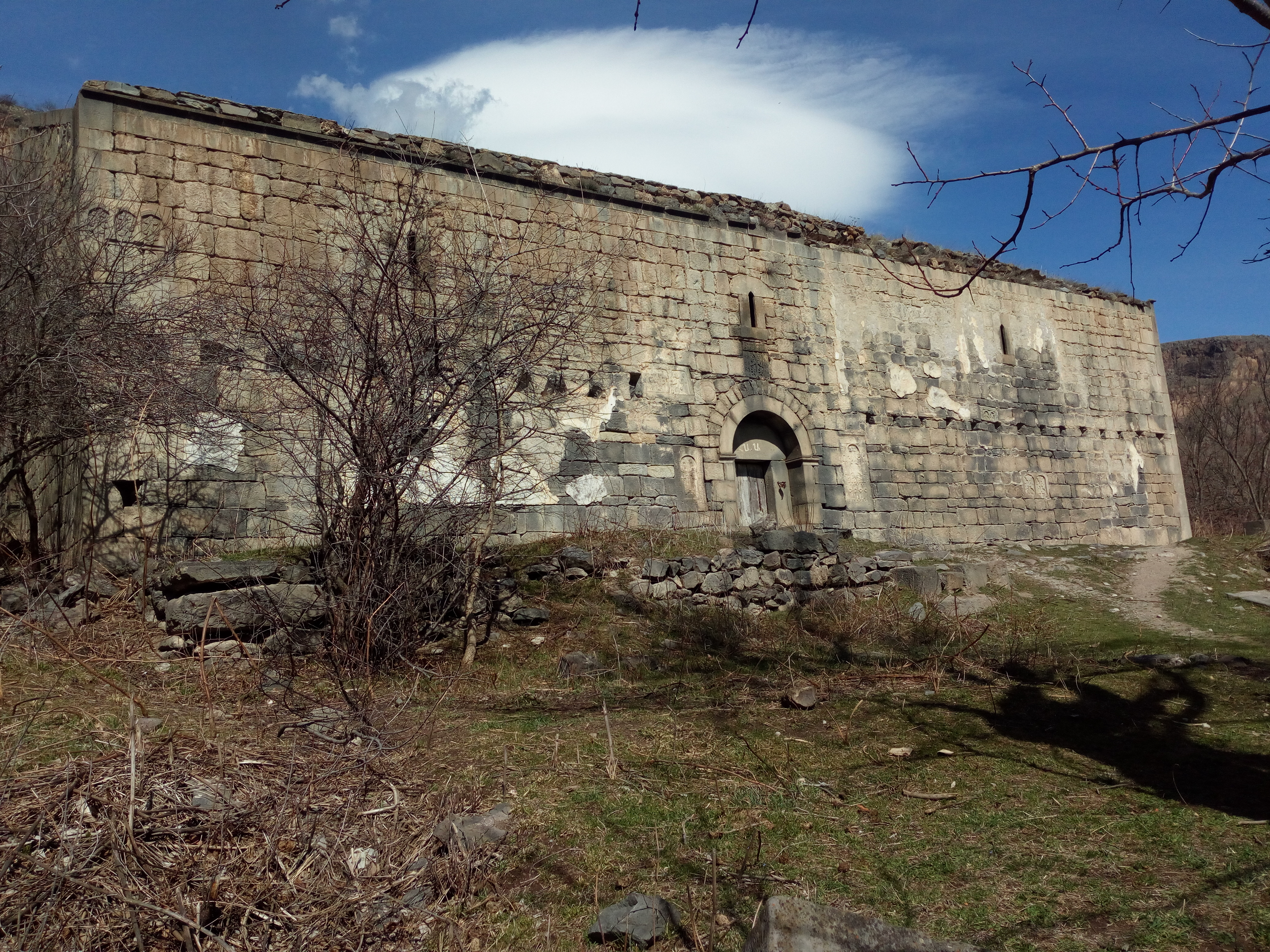
- Saint Stepanos church (Shinuhayr)
- Location: Shinuhayr, Syunik Province
- Country: Armenia
- Religious institute: Armenian Apostolic church

History
- Founded: 17th century

Architecture
- Functional status: defunct

Saint Stepanos Church (Armenian: Սուրբ Ստեփանոս վանք) is a 17th-century three-nave structure located in the Syunik Province of southeastern Armenia. It is situated 1.7 kilometers southeast of Shinuhayr village, in the center of Old Shinuhair village.

== History ==
The foundation date of the Shinuhayr settlement remains uncertain.

According to local accounts, the church was constructed in the 4th century. In the 12th century, seismic activity destroyed it. It was not reconstructed until the 17th century.

The church served as the residence of Davit-Bek in the 18th century, when it functioned as an administrative office

Operational until 1920, the church underwent a transformation during the Soviet period, accommodating a grocery store, a role it assumed until the village relocated.

The three-nave basilica and an adjacent cemetery known as Khach ("Cross") sit in the center of the village. A writing house was sited adjacent to the church. Lazar, Margarit, Astvatsatur, and others contributed to the manuscripts associated with the church.

== Commentary ==
In the late 19th century Yervand Lalayan visited Shinuhayr and observed:

In the village center stands the St. Stepanos Church, an impressively large and beautiful structure, constructed on four pillars and adorned with a dome shaped like a cross. To the east of the church, on four pillars, there rises a tall and graceful bell tower adorned with a conical roof. The portals of the church are modestly sized and unadorned, while inside, it is decorated with cross-stones and five candelabras. The surroundings of the church feature both ancient and new tombstones, contributing to the rich historical and cultural heritage of the ecclesiastical site.

On the khachkar built into the eastern wall of Saint Stepanos Church in Shinuhayri village center is engraved:

And me-Arzur, erected this khachkar for my Lord, the Son, and the Holy Spirit. Remember me. ...51+551BC

(Եվ Արզուր կանգնեցի զխաչս տեառն իմոյ և Որդոյ իմոյ, Պապկայ Հոգվոյն․ յիշեցեք ի Քս․ թվ․․․․ ԿԱ)

Ghevond Alishan (1820–1901) testifies: "Hundreds" of the date is broken: now the inscription is completely distorted

(Թվականի հարյուրավորը ջարդված է․ այժմ արձանագրությունը բոլորովին եղծված է).
