= St. Stepanos Church (Alahi) =

Armenian church in Nakhchivan, Azerbaijan

- Սուրբ Ստեփանոս եկեղեցի
- St. Stepanos Church
- Location: Ələhi
- Country: Azerbaijan
- Denomination: Armenian Apostolic Church

History
- Status: Destroyed

Architecture
- Style: domed basilica
- Demolished: 1997–2006

St. Stepanos Church was an Armenian church located in Ələhi village (Ordubad district) of the Nakhchivan Autonomous Republic of Azerbaijan. The church was located in the center of the village.

== History ==
The founding date of the church in unknown. According to the dates on cross-stones (khachkars) embedded in the walls of the interior, the church was renovated in the mid-17th century. According to an Armenian inscription, another renovation took place in 1906.

== Architecture ==
The church was a domed basilica with an apse, two vestries, and four pillars that supported a cupola. The cupola, southern vestry, and most of the roof had been destroyed by an earthquake in 1930, but the rest of the structure was still standing in the late Soviet period. There were Armenian inscriptions in the western facade and in the interior.

== Destruction ==
The church was still standing in the late Soviet period and has been destroyed at some point between 1997 and June 15, 2006, according to the Caucasus Heritage Watch.
