= Ələhi =

Village and municipality in Ordubad, Nakhchivan, Azerbaijan

- Municipality
- Location within Azerbaijan
- Coordinates: 39°10′24″N 45°53′25″E
- Country: Azerbaijan
- Autonomous republic: Nakhchivan
- District: Ordubad

Population (2005)
  - Total: 132
- Time zone: UTC+4 (AZT)

Ələhi (also, Əlik, Alahi, Alaki, Allik, and Alyagi) is a village and municipality in the Ordubad District of Nakhchivan, Azerbaijan, in the administrative unit of Bist village. It is located in the west of the Ordubad-Xurs highway, on the right bank of the Ayrichay river, on the foothill of the Gapyjyg mountain. Its population is busy with gardening, beekeeping, animal husbandry. There are incomplete secondary school, club, library, and a medical center in the village. It has a population of 132.

== Ələhi Bridge ==
The historical and architectural monument Alahi bridge is located in the upper part of the Ələhi village, on the west bank of the Ələhicay River. It has the two-span and joint arched. The western arch is big but the eastern arch is small. It was built from the gray coarse mountain stone. Size: length 30 m, width of 3 m and a height of 6.5 m. The western seat of the bridge was built on a rock. It is a historical monument of the 18th–19th centuries. At present, it's in the use of the rural population.

St. Stepanos Church was an Armenian church located in the center of the village. It was still standing in the 1980s and was destroyed at some point between 1997 and 2006.

There was also an old Armenian cemetery located in the western part of the village and destroyed at some point between 1997 and 2006.

== See also ==
- St. Stepanos Church (Alahi)
