= Saint Gevorg of Mughni Church, Tbilisi =

Church building in Tbilisi, Georgia

Saint Gevork of Mughni Church
- Մուղնեցվոց Սուրբ Գևորգ Եկեղեցի წმინდა გიორგის მუღნის ეკლესია
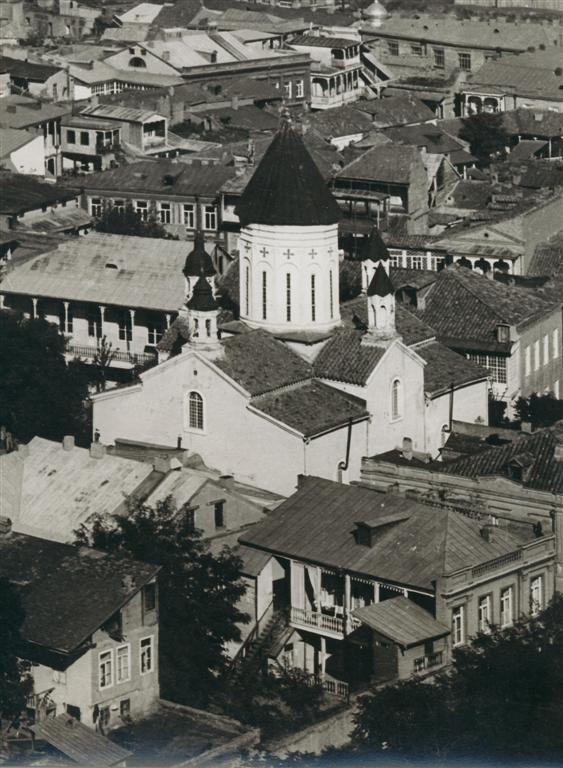

Religion
- Affiliation: Armenian Apostolic Church
- Ecclesiastical or organisational status: ruined

Location
- Location: Old Quarters, Tbilisi, Georgia
- Interactive map of Saint Gevork of Mughni Church
- Coordinates: 41.690259°N 44.804194°E

Architecture
- Style: Armenian
- Groundbreaking: 13th century
- Completed: 1756

The Saint Gevork of Mughni Church (Armenian: Մուղնեցվոց Սուրբ Գևորգ Եկեղեցի Georgian: წმინდა გიორგის მუღნის ეკლესია) also known as Saint George of Mughni Church (Gevork in Armenian is cognate with George) is a 13th-century Armenian church in Tbilisi, Georgia that was entirely rebuilt in 1756. It is made of brick and its architectural typology is that of a cross within a rectangular perimeter, with four free-standing supports.

== Current state ==
Until the mid-1980s, the church served as a museum of folk art. By 1990, it was no longer a museum and its interior lay in ruin.

The vestibule attached to the western facade of the church was destroyed in May, 1991. The large cracks in the church walls served as an excuse to Georgian authorities to destroy the church instead of repairing it.

During the night of November 18, 2009, the dome of the church collapsed. According to locals, recent rains had further weakened the already badly damaged structure of the church. Georgian television station Rustavi 2 reports that the district governor promised to allocate funds for the rehabilitation of the church after visiting the ruin on November 19, 2009.

== Gallery ==
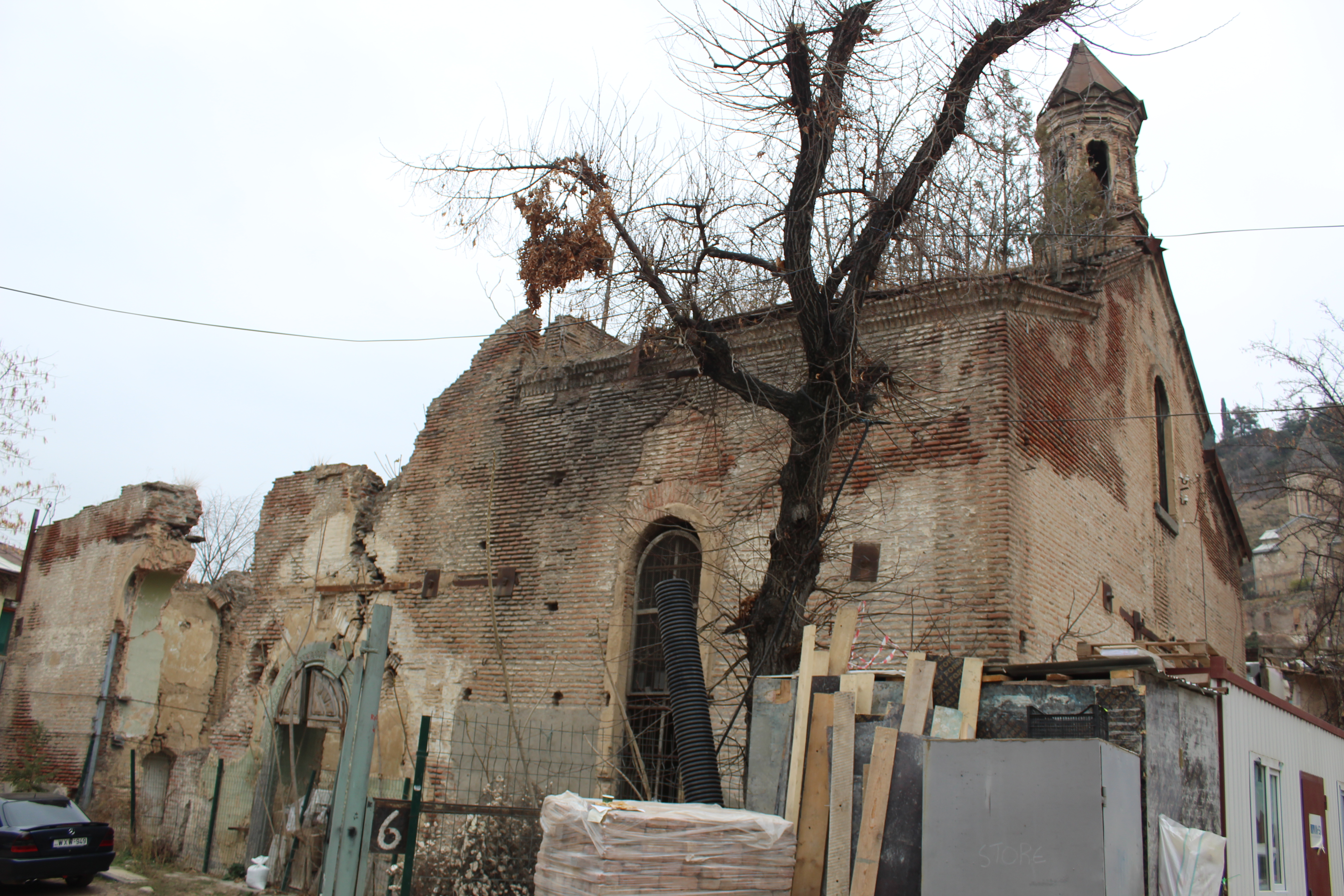
Current condition, mainly collapsed

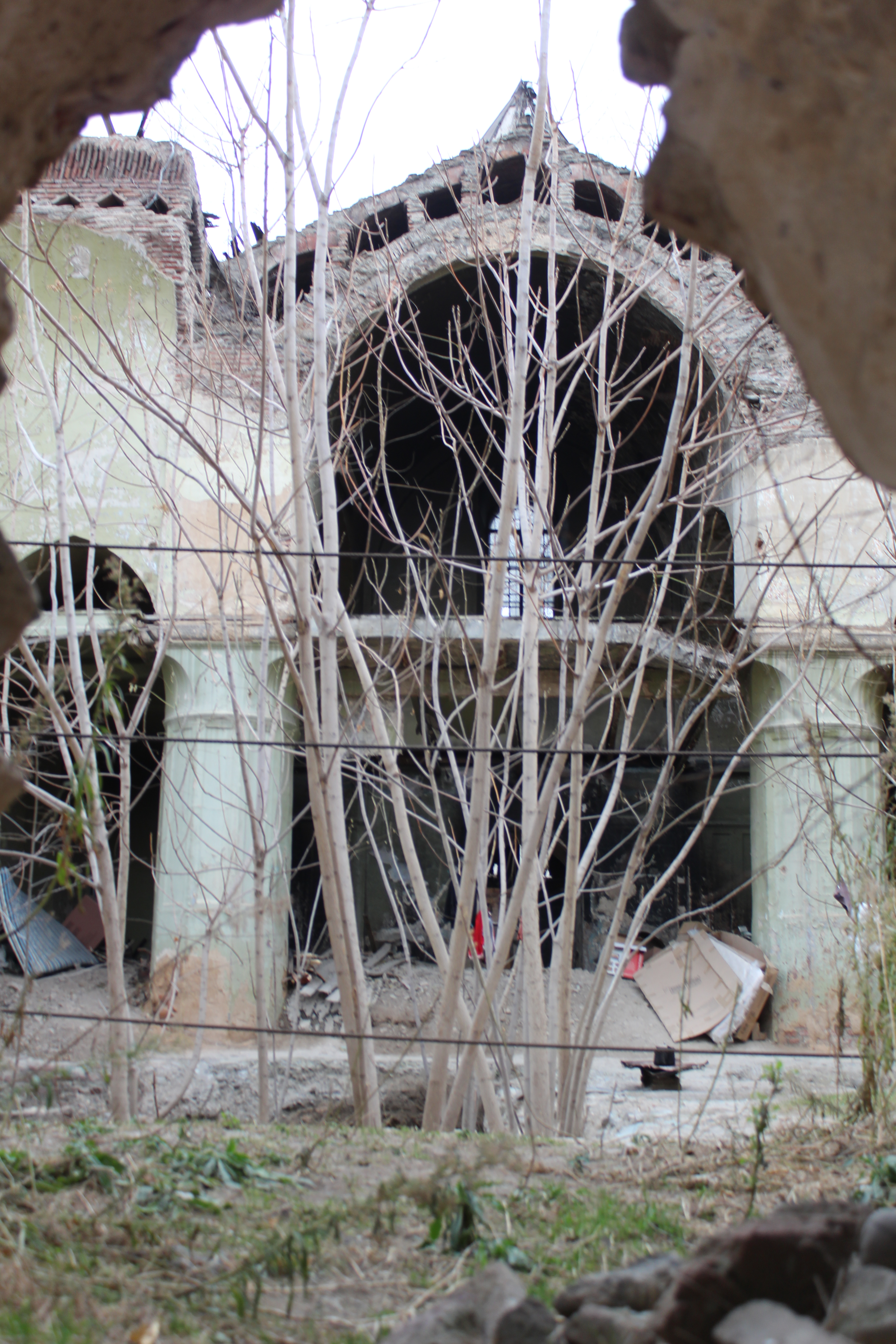
Current condition, mainly collapsed

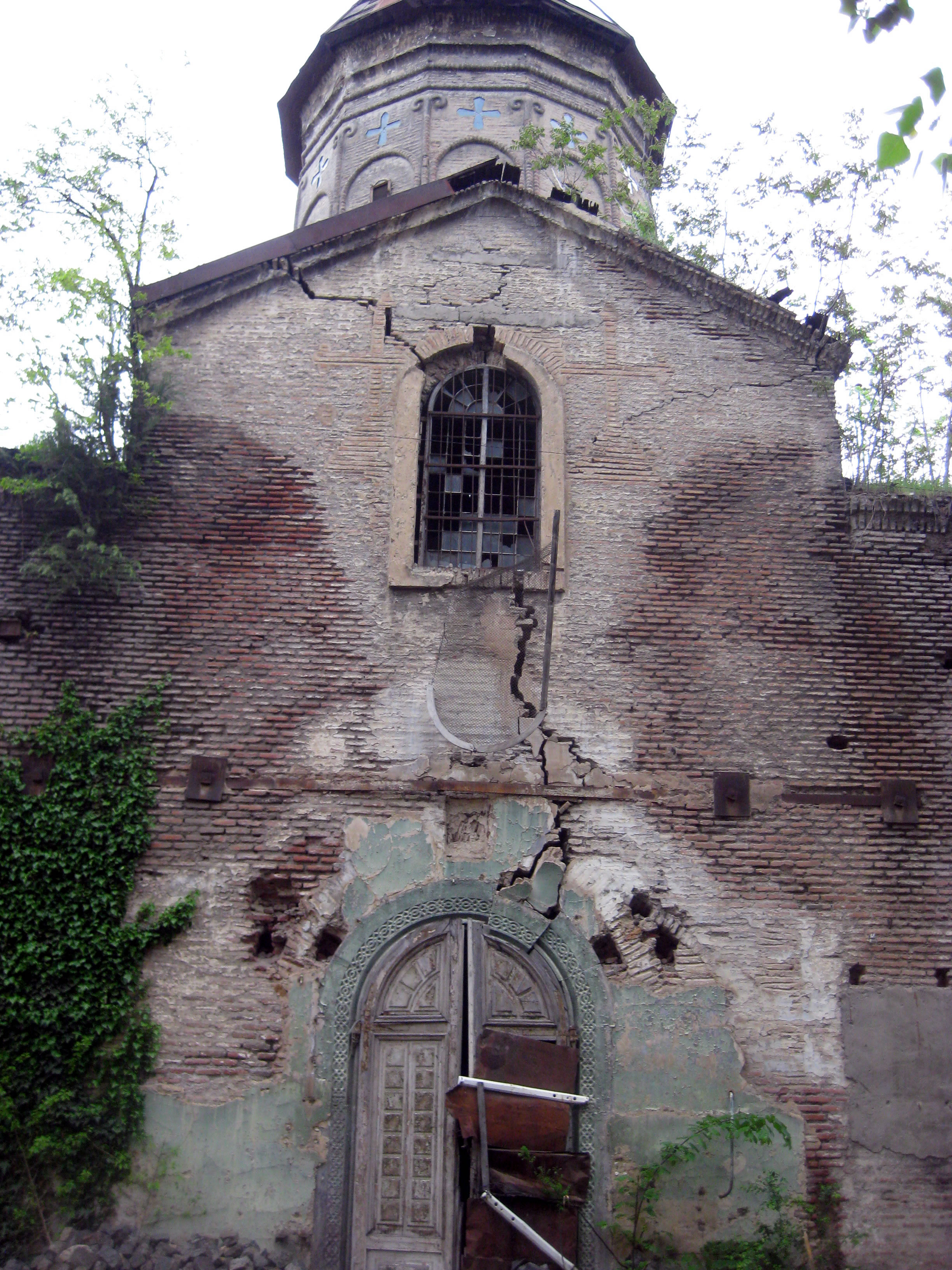
Closed entrance with cracks along the wall

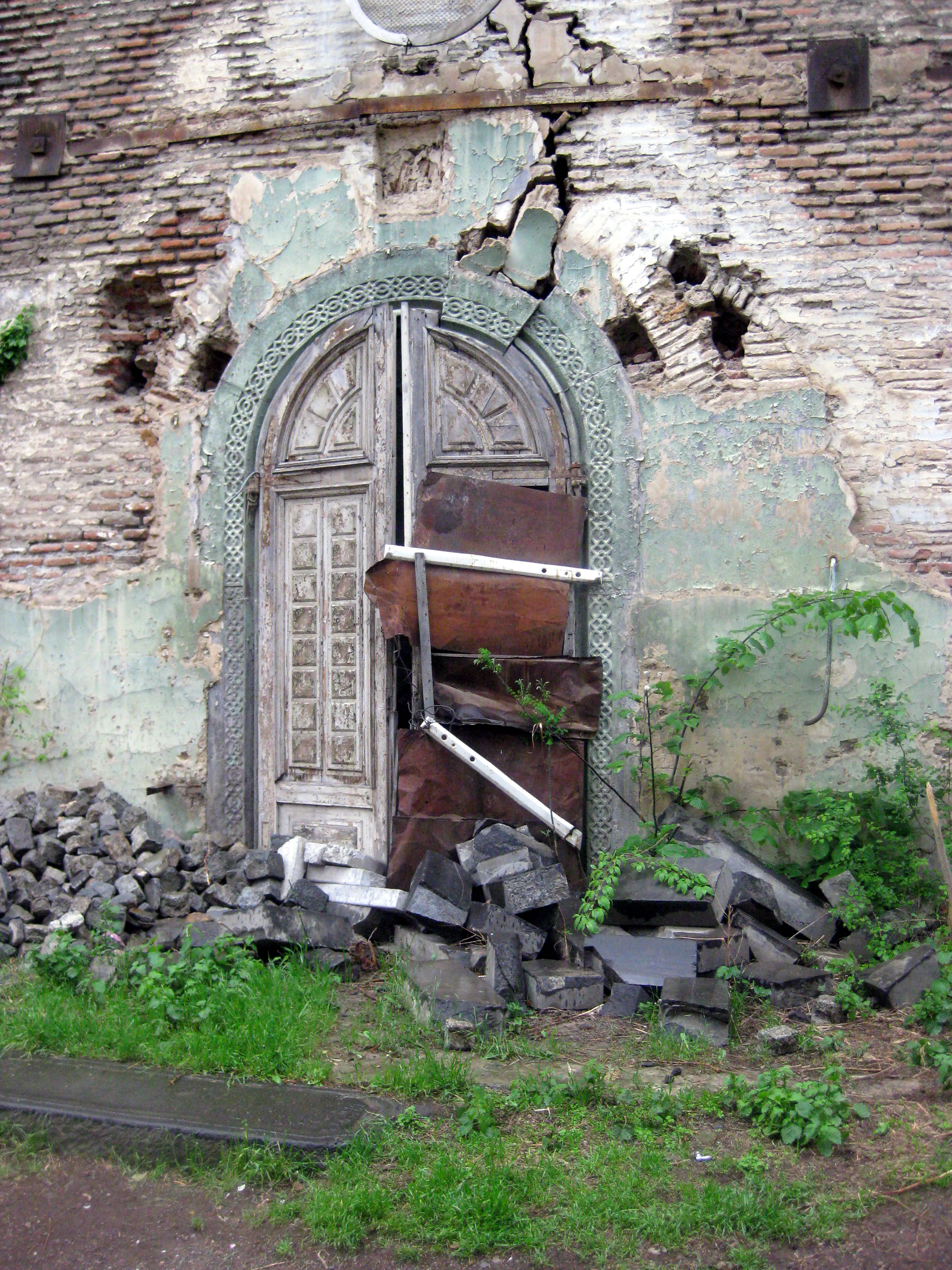
Closeup of closed entrance

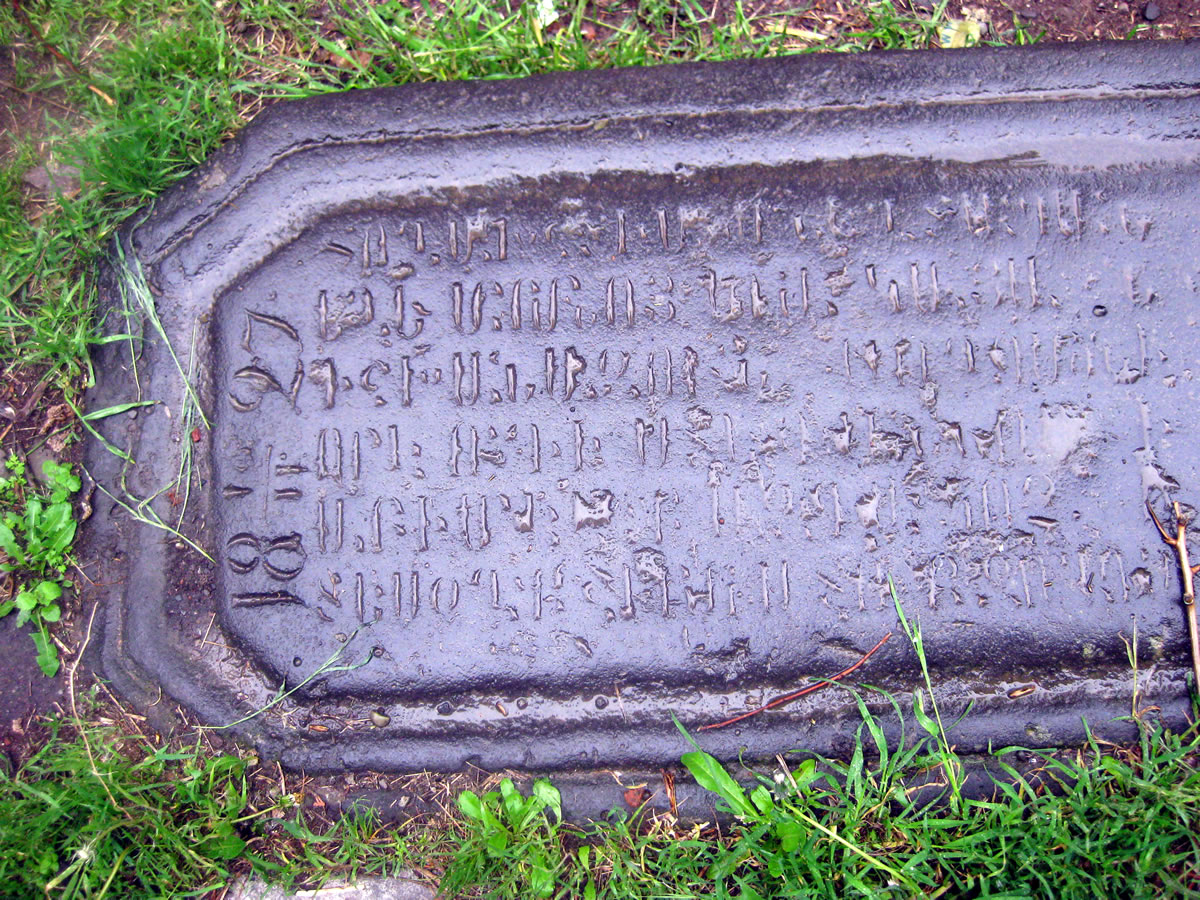
A tombstone inscription in Armenian

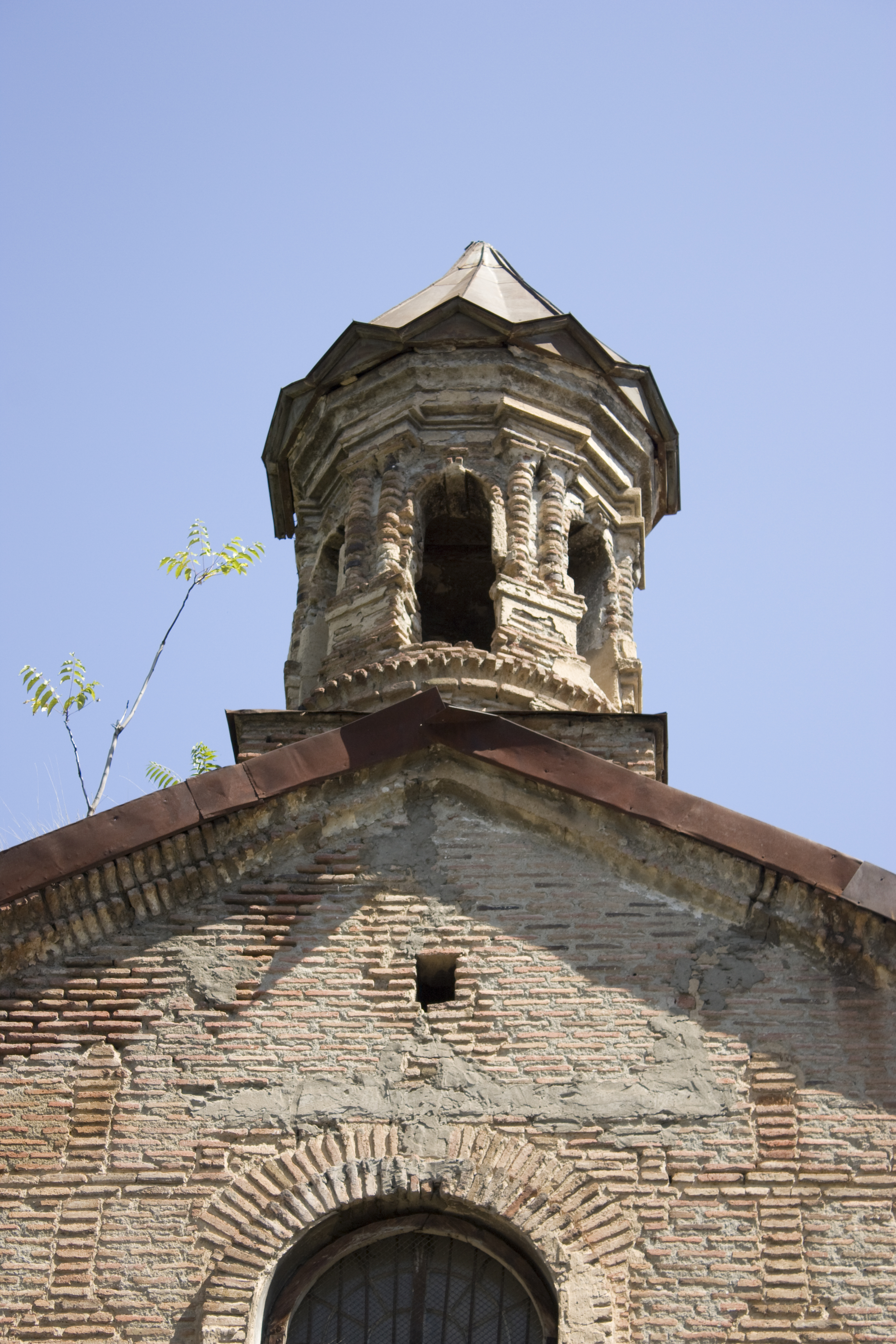
The belltower

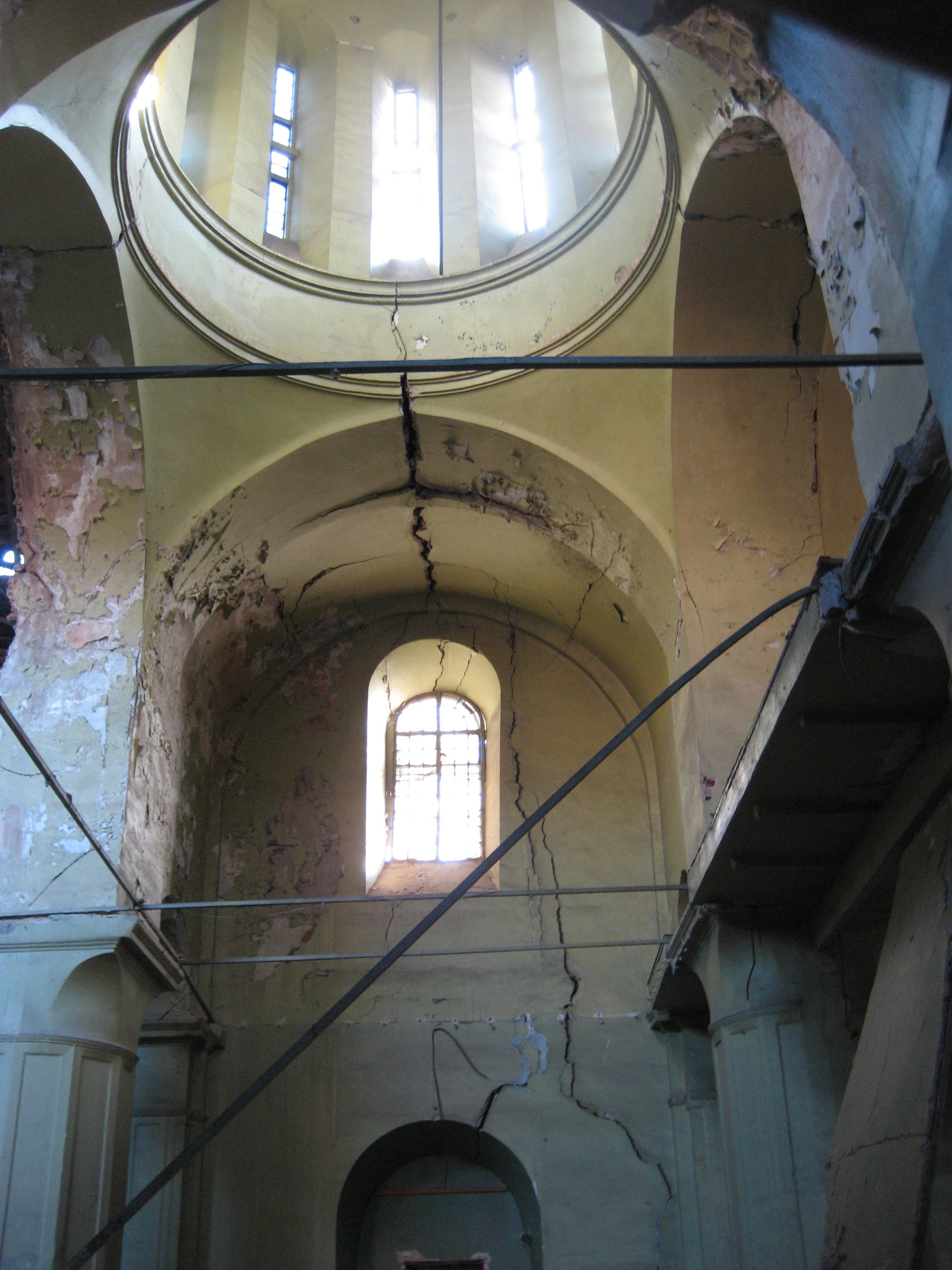
Interior of church before the final collapse

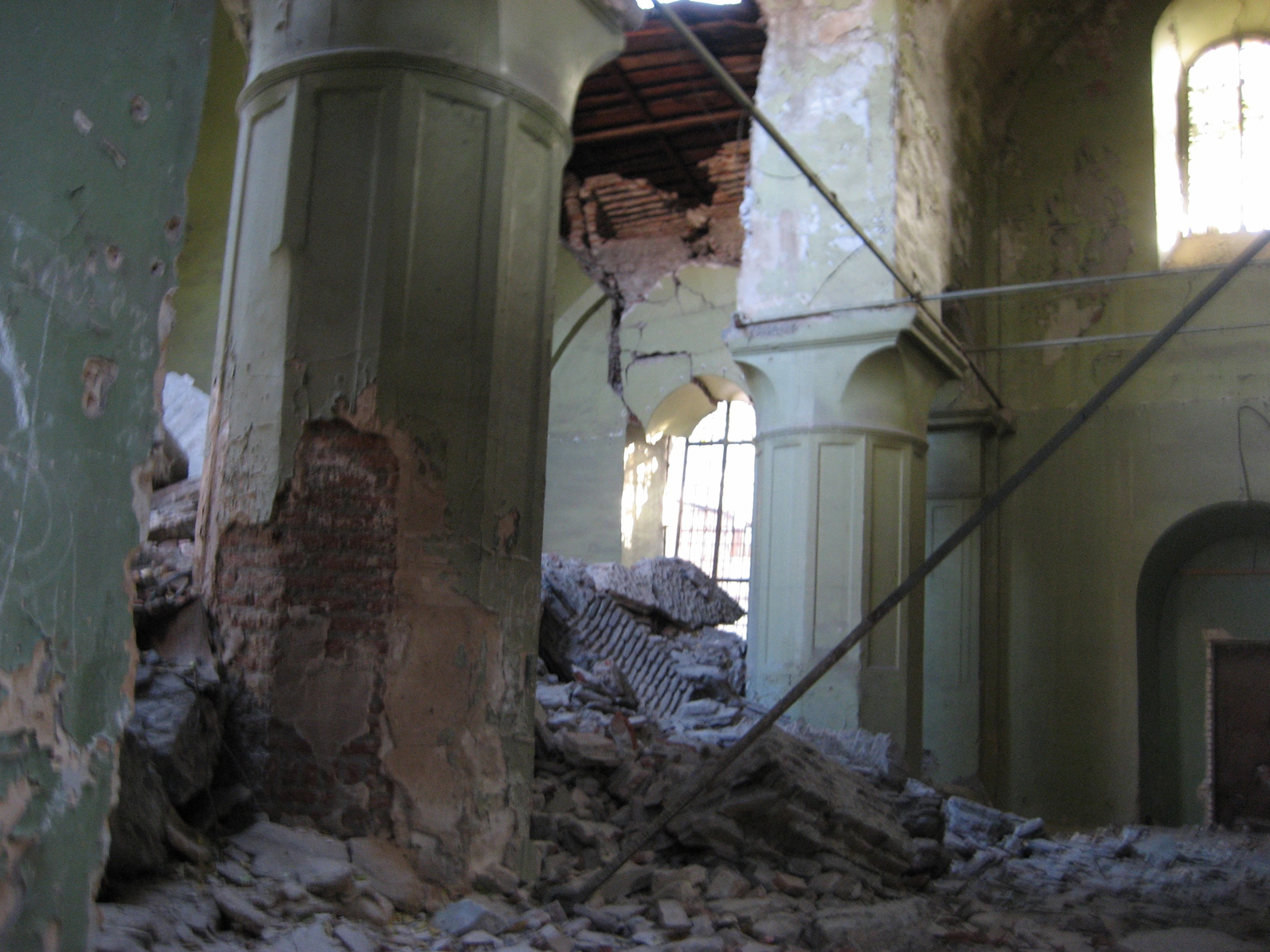
Interior of church before the final collapse

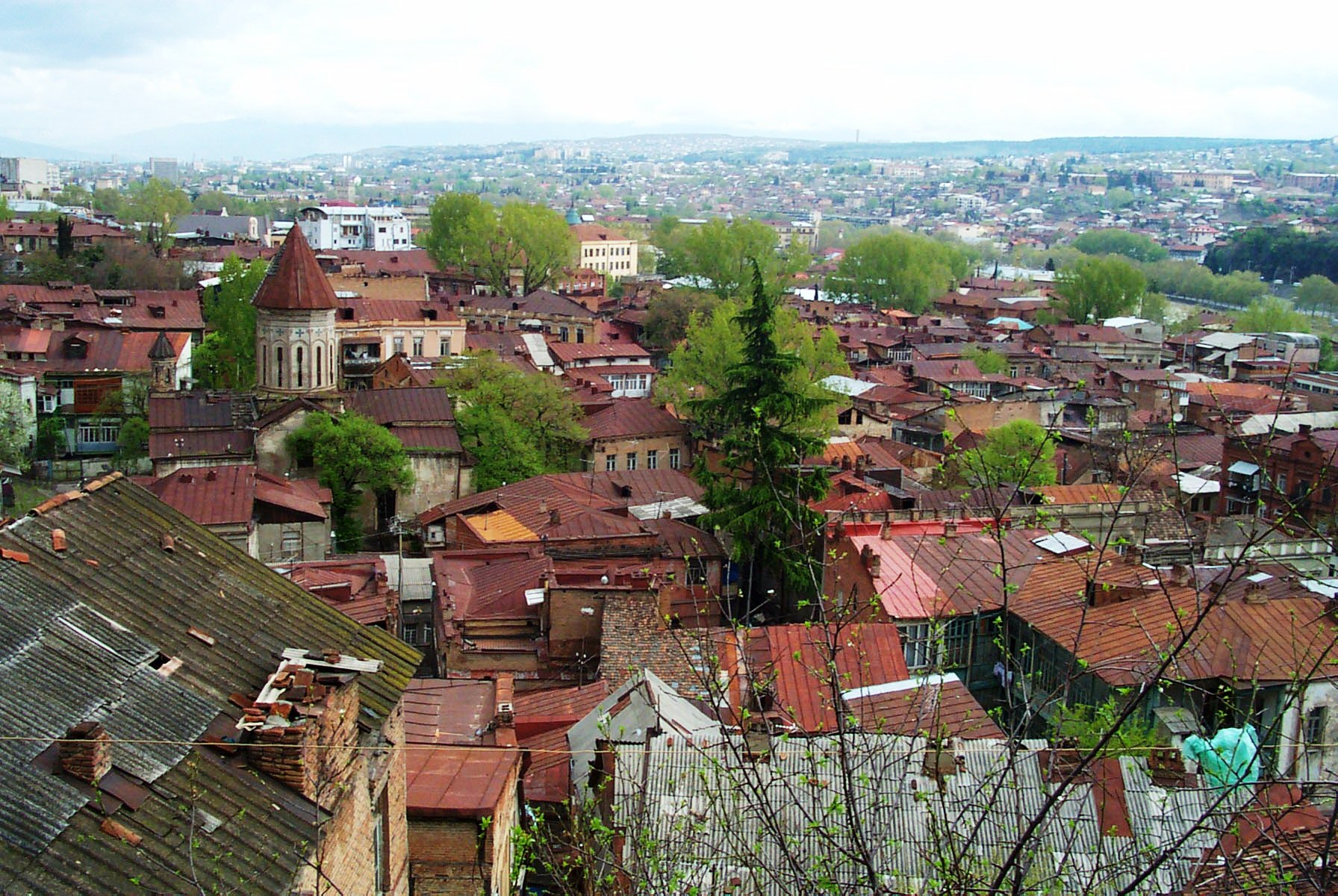
View of Old Tbilisi rooftops and the church

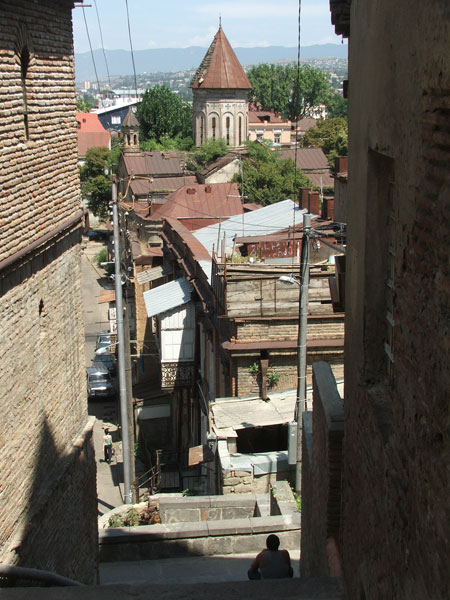
View from a narrow street

== See also ==
- Armenians in Georgia
